= Spencer Cowper =

English lawyer and politician (1670–1728)

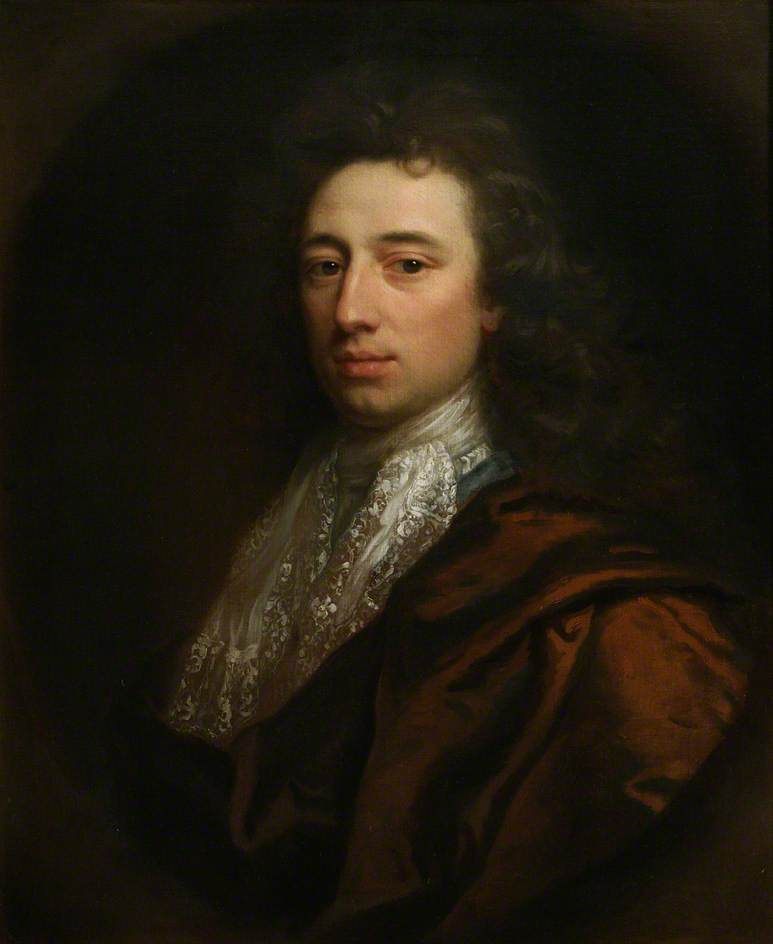
Portrait of Cowper, attributed to Godfrey Kneller

Spencer Cowper (23 February 1670 – 10 December 1728) was an English lawyer and politician who sat in the English and British House of Commons between 1705 and 1727.

== Early life ==
Cowper was the second son of Sir William Cowper, 2nd Baronet of Hertford, and his wife, Lady Sarah Cowper, the diarist, and daughter of Samuel Holled, a London merchant. He was educated at Westminster School and called to the bar in 1693. In 1690 he was made controller of the Bridge House Estates with a residence at the Bridge House, near St Olave's Church close to what is now Tooley Street Southwark.

== The Sarah Stout affair ==
Cowper served on the Home circuit, and was acquainted with a Quaker family called Stout in Hertford, who had supported his father and brother during elections in the area. The Stout's daughter Sarah fell in love with him, even though he was already married to Pennington Goodere.

One evening at the Spring assizes in March 1699, Cowper went to Sarah's home to pay her the interest on a mortgage. He returned home and the next morning Sarah was found dead in the river. The prosecution asserted that because the body was floating when found, that it must have been put in the water after death. To challenge this idea, evidence was given by the famous physicians Samuel Garth and Hans Sloane. It appears that there was no other evidence to support the charge. The defendants were acquitted.

At the time different allegations were made concerning the affair, including the one that the Tories of Hertford wanted to hang a member of a prominent Whig family and another that the Quakers wanted to clear themselves from the stigma of suicide. Pamphlets were published on both sides, and there was an unsuccessful attempt to reignite the case.

== Career ==
Cowper subsequently represented Bere Alston in 1705 and was re-elected at the 1708 election. He was one of the managers of the impeachment of Henry Sacheverell, but lost his seat, in 1710, in the reaction that followed. In 1714, he became attorney-general to the Prince of Wales.

Cowper was elected MP for Truro in 1715. In 1717 he was appointed chief justice of Chester. With the accession of George II in 1727, Cowper was made attorney-general to the duchy of Lancaster, and then in 1727 a judge of the common pleas.

Cowper died on 10 December 1728 and was buried at the family seat Hertingfordbury where a monument to him by Louis-François Roubiliac was erected.

== Family ==
His first wife Pennington died in November 1727.

Spencer married his second wife Theodora, the widow of John Stepney MP, shortly before his death in 1728. Theodora commissioned Roubiliac to erect her husband's monument.

Cowper's eldest son William Cowper was clerk of parliament and the father of General William Cowper of Hertingfordbury Park (MP). William died on 14 February 1740. Spencer's second son, John, was the father of William Cowper the poet. His third son Ashley was also clerk of parliament and a barrister, and the father of Theodora Cowper (with whom the poet fell in love) and Harriot Cowper (Lady Hesketh). He died in 1788. Cowper's only daughter was Judith Madan, a poet. She married Colonel Martin Madan (MP), Groom of the Chamber to Frederick, Prince of Wales, and M.P. for Wootton Bassett.

Cowper Family Tree

William Cowper (d. 1664); 1st Baronet of Ratling Court in the County of Kent	Martha Master
Joyce Hukeley (1622–1669)	John Cowper (1613–1643)	Sir Samuel Holled (1619–1661)	Anne Cowper (d. 1664)
William Cowper (1639–1706); 2nd Baronet of Ratling Court	Sarah Cowper (1644–1720)
Baron Cowper of Wingham in the County of Kent, 1706; Earl Cowper and Viscount Fordwich, in the County of Kent, 1718
Elizabeth Culling (1676–1703)	William Cowper (1665–1723); 1st Earl Cowper, 1st Viscount Fordwich, 3rd Baronet of Ratling Court	1) Judith Booth (d. 1705)	2) Mary Clavering (1685–1724)	Samuel Cowper (1666)	John Cowper (1667–1686)	Spencer Cowper (1670–1728)	Pennington; Goodere (1667–1727)
William Cowper (1697–1719)	Mary Cowper (1700–1740)	William Cowper (1687–1692?)	William Cowper (1689–1740)	Spencer Cowper (1690)	Spencer Cowper (1691–1706)	John Cowper (1694–1756)	Ashley Cowper (1701–1768)	Judith Madan (1702–1781)
Sarah Cowper (1707–1764)	William Clavering-Cowper (1709–1764); 2nd Earl Cowper, 2nd Viscount Fordwich, 4th Baronet of Ratling Court	Anne Cowper (1710–1764)	Spencer Cowper (1713–1774)	William Cowper (1731–1800)
George Nassau Clavering-Cowper (1738–1789); 3rd Earl Cowper, 3rd Viscount Fordwich, 5th Baronet of Ratling Court
George Augustus Clavering-Cowper (1776–1799); 4th Earl Cowper, 4th Viscount Fordwich, 6th Baronet of Ratling Court	Peter Leopold Louis Francis Nassau (1778–1837); 5th Earl Cowper, 5th Viscount Fordwich, 7th Baronet of Ratling Court
George Augustus Frederick Cowper (1806–1856); 6th Earl Cowper, 6th Viscount Fordwich, 8th Baronet of Ratling Court
Francis Thomas de Grey Cowper (1834–1905); 7th Earl Cowper, 7th Viscount Fordwich, 8th Baron Lucas, 3rd Baron Butler, 9th Baronet of Ratling Court, 4th Lord Dingwall	Florence Amabell Herbert	Auberon Edward William Molyneux Herbert (1838–1906)
Earldom of Cowper, Viscountcy of Fordwich, Barony of Cowper, Baronetcy of Ratlingcourt extinct, 1905
Auberon Thomas Herbert (1876–1916); 9th Baron Lucas, 5th Lord Dingwall	Nan Ino Cooper (1880–1958); 10th Baroness Lucas, 6th Lady Dingwall
Anne Rosemary Palmer (d. 1991); 11th Baroness Lucas, 7th Lady Dingwall
Ralph Matthew Palmer (b. 1951); 12th Baron Lucas, 8th Lord Dingwall

Parliament of England
Preceded by William Cowper; Sir Peter King	Member of Parliament for Bere Alston; 1705–1707; With: Sir Peter King	Succeeded by Parliament of Great Britain
Parliament of Great Britain
Preceded by Parliament of England	Member of Parliament for Bere Alston; 1707–1710; With: Sir Peter King	Succeeded by Lawrence Carter; Sir Peter King
Preceded by Thomas Hare; William Collier	Member of Parliament for Truro; 1715–1727; With: John Selwyn 1715-1721; Thomas Wyndham 1721-1727	Succeeded by Hugh Boscawen; Sidney Meadows
