= William Cowper, 1st Earl Cowper =

17th- and 18-century English politician and first Lord Chancellor of Great Britain

The Right Honourable The Earl Cowper PC KC FRS
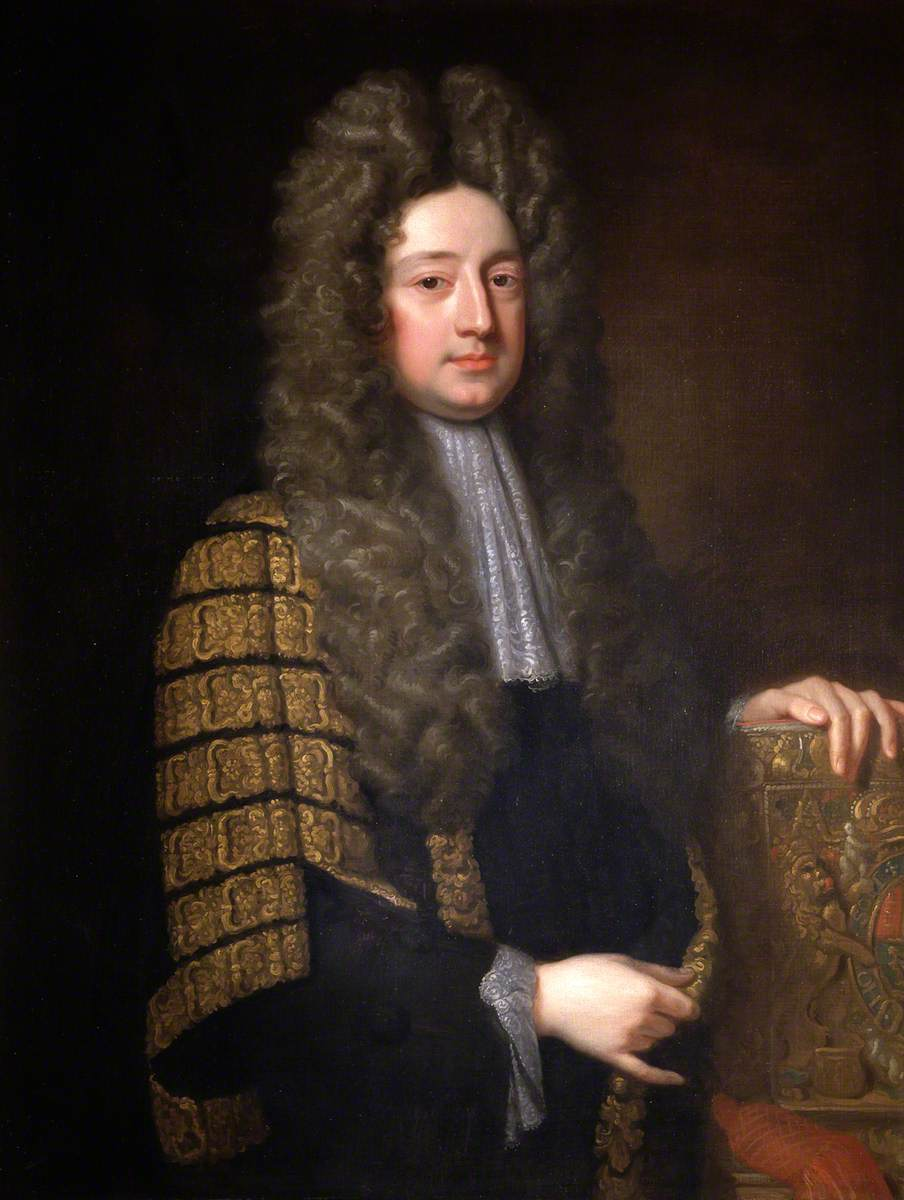
- Portrait by Jonathan Richardson

Lord Chancellor Lord High Steward for the trials of: List: The Earl of Derwentwater; The Lord Widdrington; The Earl of Nithsdale; The Earl of Carnwath; The Viscount of Kenmure; The Lord Nairne; The Earl of Winton; The Earl of Oxford and Mortimer
- In office 4 May 1707 – 23 September 1710
- Monarch: Anne
- Preceded by: himself as Lord Keeper
- Succeeded by: In Commission
- In office 21 September 1714 – 15 April 1718
- Monarchs: Anne; George I
- Preceded by: The Lord Harcourt
- Succeeded by: In Commission

Lord Keeper of the Great Seal of England
- In office 11 October 1705 – 4 May 1707
- Monarch: Anne
- Preceded by: Sir Nathan Wright
- Succeeded by: himself as Lord Chancellor

Personal details
- Born: c. 1665
- Died: 10 October 1723 Panshanger, Hertfordshire; Great Britain
- Children: William Clavering-Cowper; Spencer Cowper
- Parents: William Cowper (father); Sarah Cowper (mother)
- Relatives: Spencer Cowper (brother); Judith Madan (niece)

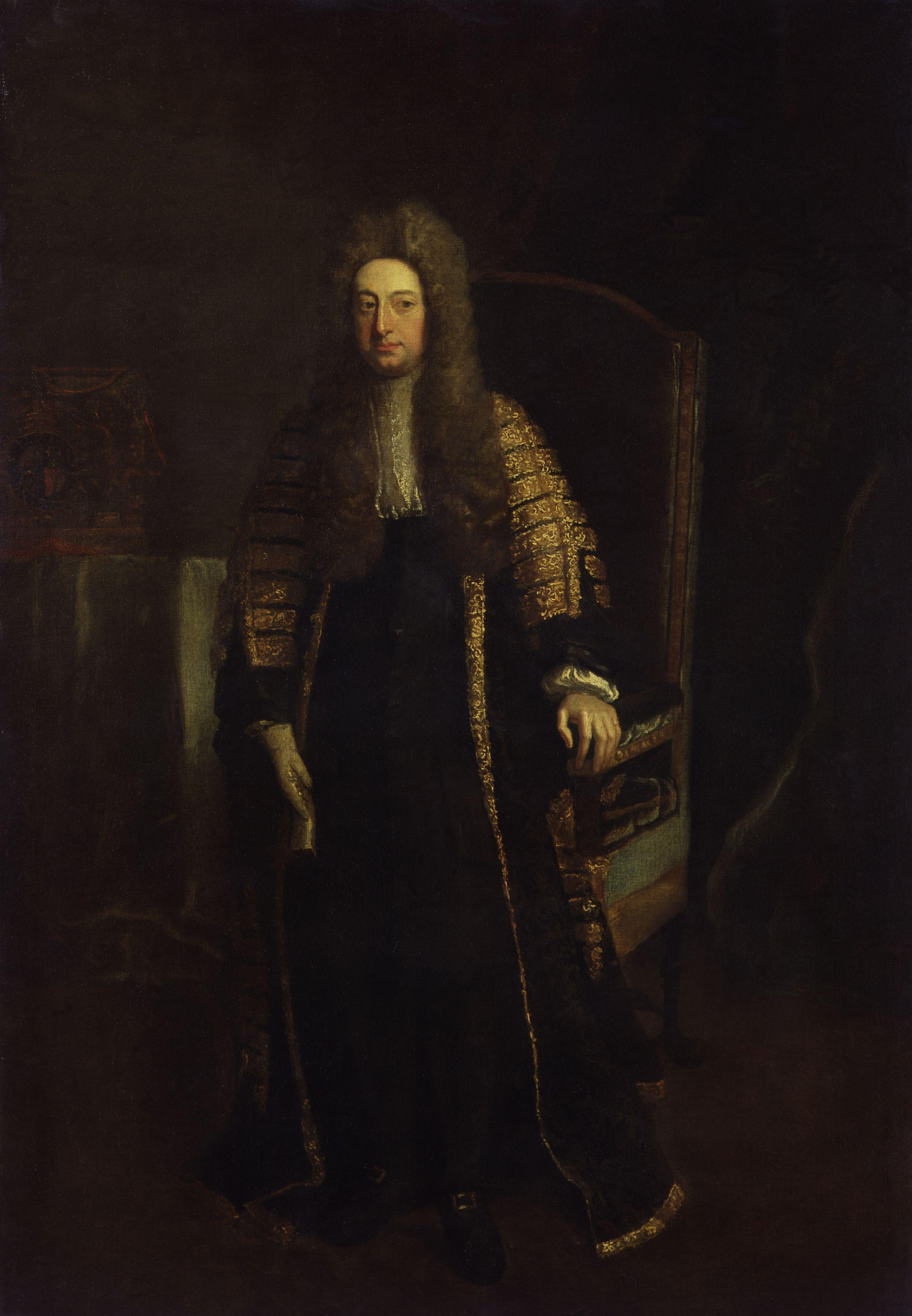
The Earl Cowper.

William Cowper, 1st Earl Cowper, PC, KC, FRS (/ˈkuːpər/ KOO-pər; c. 1665 – 10 October 1723) was an English politician who became the first Lord High Chancellor of Great Britain. Cowper was the son of Sir William Cowper, 2nd Baronet, of Ratling Court, Kent, a Whig member of parliament of some mark in the two last Stuart reigns.

== Career and titles ==
Cowper was educated at St Albans School in Hertfordshire, and was later to acquire a country estate in the county and represent the county town in Parliament. He was admitted to Middle Temple on 18 March 1681/82, was called to the bar on 25 May 1688, and built up a large practice. He gave his allegiance to the Prince of Orange on his landing in England in 1688, and was made King's Counsel and recorder of Colchester in 1694.

Cowper had the reputation of being one of the most effective parliamentary orators of his generation. He lost his seat in parliament in 1702 owing to the unpopularity caused by the trial of his brother Spencer Cowper on a charge of murder.

=== Lord Keeper of the Great Seal ===
On 11 October 1705 he was sworn to the Privy Council, was appointed Lord Keeper of the Great Seal, and took his seat on the woolsack without a peerage. In the following year he conducted the negotiations between the English and Scottish commissioners for arranging the union with Scotland. In November of that year he succeeded to his father's baronetcy, and on 14 December 1706, he was raised to the peerage as Baron Cowper of Wingham, Kent. He was the youngest Lord Keeper for many years: the Queen, who had taken a great liking to him, joked that "she had given the Seals to a boy" and suggested that in future he should wear a wig to lend him gravity.

=== Lord High Chancellor ===
When the union with Scotland came into operation in May 1707 the Queen in Council named Cowper Lord High Chancellor of Great Britain, he being the first to hold this office. He presided at the trial of Dr Sacheverell in 1710, but resigned the seal when Harley and Bolingbroke took office in the same year. Queen Anne, who had high regard for him, "begged him with tears in her eyes" not to resign, and though she was reluctantly persuaded to accept his resignation, continued to consult him unofficially for the remainder of her reign. On the death of Queen Anne, George I appointed Cowper one of the Lords Justice for governing the country during the king's absence, and a few weeks later he again became Lord Chancellor.

=== Lord High Steward ===
A paper which Cowper drew up for the guidance of the new king on constitutional matters, entitled An Impartial History of Parties, marks the advance of English opinion towards party government in the modern sense. It was published by Lord Campbell in his Lives of the Lord Chancellors. Cowper supported the impeachment of Lord Oxford for high treason in 1715, and in 1716 presided as Lord High Steward at the trials of the peers charged with complicity in the Jacobite rising, his sentences on whom have been censured as unnecessarily severe. He warmly supported the Septennial Bill in the same year.

=== Viscount Fordwich and Earl Cowper ===
On 18 March 1718 he was created Viscount Fordwich and Earl Cowper, and a month later he resigned office on the plea of ill-health, but probably in reality because George I accused him of espousing the Prince of Wales's side in the prince's quarrel with the king. Taking the lead against his former colleagues, Cowper opposed the proposed Peerage Bill brought forward in 1719 to limit the number of peers, and also opposed the bill of attainder against Atterbury in 1723. Cowper was not a great lawyer, but Burnet says that he managed the Court of Chancery with impartial justice and great despatch; the most eminent of his contemporaries agreed in extolling his oratory and his virtues. It is notable that Queen Anne, despite her prejudice against the Whigs in general, came to have great respect and liking for Cowper, and continued to seek his advice even after he left office as Lord Chancellor.

== Trial of Spencer Cowper ==
His younger brother, Spencer Cowper (1669–1728), was tried for the murder of Sarah Stout in 1699, but was acquitted; the lady, who had allegedly fallen in love with Cowper, having committed suicide on account of his inattention—at least according to Cowper's lawyers. Spencer was one of the managers of the impeachment of Henry Sacheverell, was Attorney-General to the Prince of Wales (1714), Chief Justice of Chester (1717), and Judge of the Common Pleas (1727). He was great uncle of William Cowper, the poet.

== Personal life ==
=== Marriages ===
William Cowper was twice married: first, in about 1686, to Judith, daughter and heiress of Sir Robert Booth, a London merchant; and secondly, in 1706, to Mary, daughter of John Clavering, of Chopwell, Durham. The latter marriage seems to have been based on Cowper's admiration of her beauty although he demanded to see her undressed before the wedding. The 1st Earl left two sons and two daughters by his second wife:

- Lady Sarah Cowper (1707–1758)
- William Clavering-Cowper (1709–1764), succeeded as 2nd Earl
- Spencer Cowper (1713–1774), Dean of Durham
- Lady Anne Cowper (died 1750), married James Colleton MP

=== Mistress ===
Elizabeth Culling was the mistress of William Cowper, and bore him two children. She was the daughter of John Culling of Hertingfordbury Park, who died in 1687/8, and was buried in St Helen's, Bishopsgate. Her brother John died in January 1702/3 without issue, and Elizabeth inherited the estate. She died on 27 November 1703, and was buried at Hertingfordbury. Of her children, William, born on 14 November 1697, died in Paris on 31 October 1719. Mary, born on 10 September 1700, lived to maturity, and married one Robert Isaacson.

Tory writers satirised Lord Cowper as a bigamist. In The New Atalantis by Delarivier Manley, the married Hernando eloquently persuades an impressionable young woman that double marriage is lawful, seducing her with a sham marriage ceremony. Jonathan Swift referred to Cowper as "Will Bigamy". In his diary, Thomas Hearne recorded that Cowper was "well known to have had two wives at a time". The rumours may have gained traction because Elizabeth Culling was of a station in life that perhaps would, in other circumstances, have led to her becoming Cowper's wife, rather than his mistress. In her will, she acknowledges that the children are her natural children, and the children were also acknowledged by Lord Cowper and his second wife, as will be seen from the correspondence.

== Later years and death ==
In his last years Cowper was accused, but probably without reason, of active sympathy with the Jacobites. He died at his residence, Cole Green near Panshanger in Hertfordshire on 10 October 1723. Mary, who was devastated by his death, outlived him by only a few months.

== Relatives ==
Cowper Family Tree

William Cowper d. 1664; 1st Baronet of Ratling Court in the County of Kent	Martha Master
Joyce Hukeley; 1622–1669	John Cowper; 1613–1643	Sir Samuel Holled; 1619–1661	Anne Cowper d. 1664
William Cowper; 1639–1706; 2nd Baronet of Ratling Court	Sarah Cowper; 1644–1720
Baron Cowper of Wingham in the County of Kent, 1706; Earl Cowper and Viscount Fordwich, in the County of Kent, 1718
Elizabeth Culling; 1676–1703	William Cowper; 1665–1723; 1st Earl Cowper, etc., 3rd Baronet of Ratling Court	1) Judith Booth d. 1705	2) Mary Clavering; 1685–1724	also: Samuel Cowper; 1666 John Cowper; 1667–1686	Spencer Cowper; 1670–1728	Pennington; Goodere; 1667–1727
William Cowper; 1697–1719	Mary Cowper; 1700–1740	William Cowper; 1687–c. 1692	William Cowper; 1689–1740	Spencer Cowper; 1690	also: Spencer Cowper; 1691–1706 John Cowper; 1694–1756 Ashley Cowper; 1701–1768	Judith Madan; 1702–1781
Sarah Cowper; 1707–1764	William Clavering-Cowper; 1709–1764; 2nd Earl Cowper, etc., 4th Baronet of Ratling Court	Anne Cowper; 1710–1764	Spencer Cowper; 1713–1774	William Cowper; 1731–1800
George Nassau Clavering-Cowper; 1738–1789; 3rd Earl Cowper, etc., 5th Baronet of Ratling Court
George Augustus Clavering-Cowper; 1776–1799; 4th Earl Cowper, etc., 6th Baronet of Ratling Court	Peter Leopold Louis Francis Nassau; 1778–1837; 5th Earl Cowper, etc., 7th Baronet of Ratling Court
George Augustus Frederick Cowper; 1806–1856; 6th Earl Cowper, etc., 8th Baronet of Ratling Court
Francis Thomas de Grey Cowper; 1834–1905; 7th Earl Cowper, etc., 8th Baron Lucas, 3rd Baron Butler, 4th Lord Dingwall, 9th Baronet of Ratling Court	Florence Amabell Herbert	Auberon Edward William Molyneux Herbert; 1838–1906
Earldom of Cowper, Viscountcy of Fordwich, Barony of Cowper, Baronetcy of Ratlingcourt extinct, 1905
Auberon Thomas Herbert; 1876–1916; 9th Baron Lucas, 5th Lord Dingwall	Nan Ino Cooper; 1880–1958; 10th Baroness Lucas, 6th Lady Dingwall
Anne Rosemary Palmer d. 1991; 11th Baroness Lucas, 7th Lady Dingwall
Ralph Matthew Palmer b. 1951; 12th Baron Lucas, 8th Lord Dingwall

== Arms ==
Coat of arms of William Cowper, 1st Earl Cowper
Crest A lion's jamb erased Or holding a cherry branch Vert fructed Gules. Escutcheon Argent three martlets Gules on a chief engrailed of the last three annulets Or. Supporters Two dun horses close cropped (except a tuft on the withers) and docked a large blaze down the face a black list down the back and three white feet viz both hind and the near fore foot. Motto Tuum Est (It Is Thine)

== Footnotes ==
Parliament of England
Preceded by Sir William Cowper, Bt; Sir William Leman, Bt	Member of Parliament for Hertford; 1695–1701; With: Sir William Cowper, Bt	Succeeded by Charles Caesar; Thomas Filmer
Preceded by Sir Rowland Gwynne; Sir Peter King	Member of Parliament for Bere Alston; 1701–1705; With: Sir Peter King	Succeeded by Sir Peter King; Spencer Cowper
Political offices
Preceded by Sir Nathan Wright	Lord Keeper of the Great Seal; 1705–1707	Succeeded by Himself as Lord High Chancellor of Great Britain
Preceded by Himself as Lord Keeper	Lord High Chancellor of Great Britain; 1707–1710	In commission Title next held by The Lord Harcourt as Lord Keeper
Preceded by In Commission	Lord High Chancellor of Great Britain; 1714–1718	Succeeded by The Earl of Macclesfield
Honorary titles
Preceded by The 2nd Earl of Essex	Lord Lieutenant of Hertfordshire; 1710–1712	Succeeded by The Earl of Salisbury
Preceded by The Earl of Salisbury	Lord Lieutenant of Hertfordshire; 1715–1722	Succeeded by The 3rd Earl of Essex
Peerage of Great Britain
New creation	Earl Cowper; 1718–1723	Succeeded by William Clavering-Cowper
Peerage of England
New creation	Baron Cowper; 1706–1723	Succeeded by William Clavering-Cowper
Baronetage of England
Preceded by William Cowper	Baronet (of Ratlingcourt); 1706–1723	Succeeded by William Clavering-Cowper
