= William Clavering-Cowper, 2nd Earl Cowper =

18th-century British noble

William Clavering-Cowper
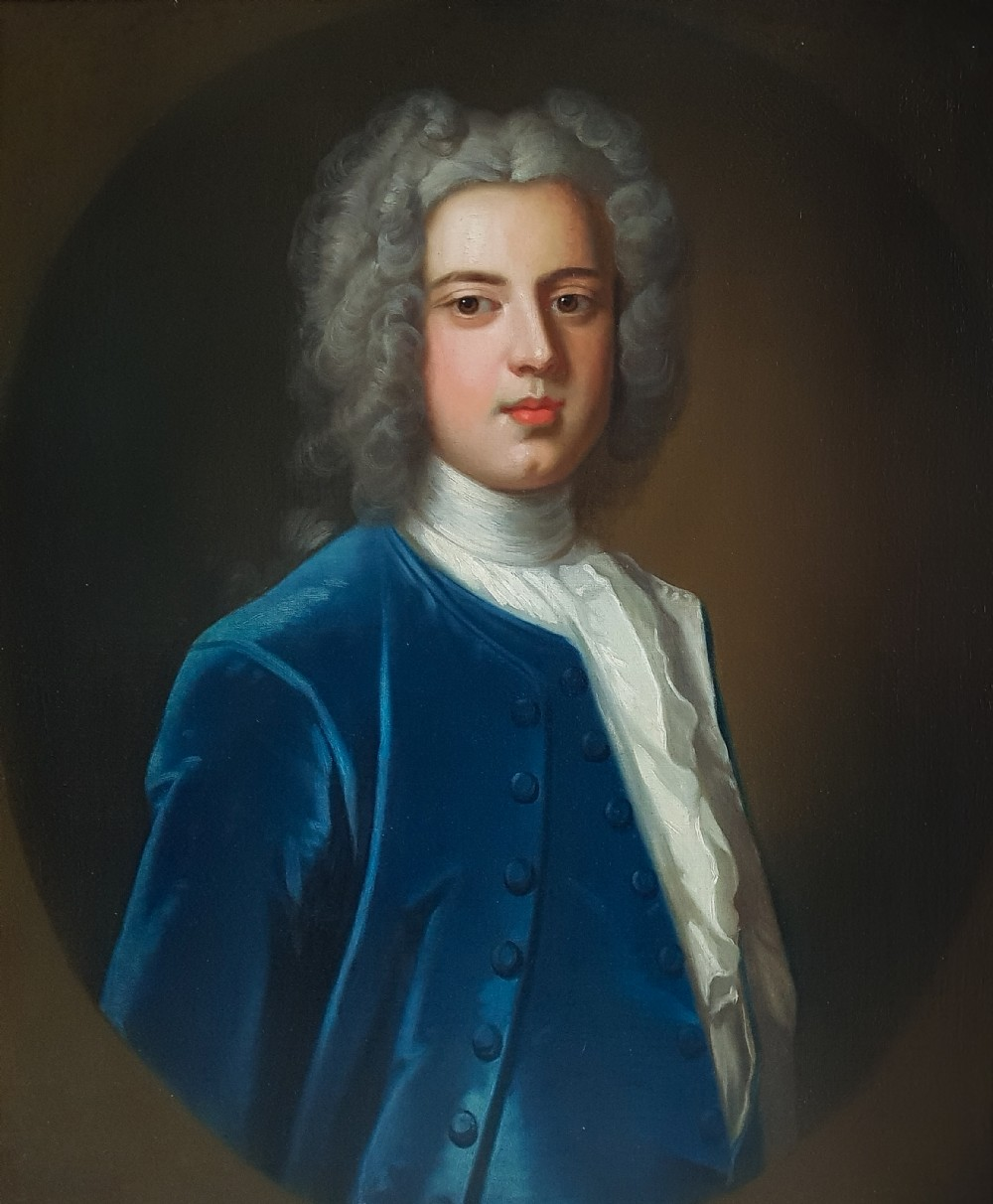
- portrait c. 1732
- Born: 13 August 1709
- Died: 18 September 1764 (aged 55)
- Education: Exeter College, Oxford (DCL)
- Spouse: Georgiana Carteret (m. 1750)
- Children: George
- Parent(s): William Cowper; Mary Clavering

William Clavering-Cowper, 2nd Earl Cowper (13 August 1709 – 18 September 1764), styled Viscount Fordwich between 1718 and 1723, was an English peer and courtier.

Born William Cowper, he was the eldest son of William Cowper, 1st Earl Cowper and his second wife Mary, daughter of John Clavering of Chopwell, County Durham. He later assumed the additional surname of Clavering on the death of his maternal uncle.

He was educated at Exeter College, Oxford, matriculating in 1725 aged 16, created DCL in 1728.

He succeeded his father in the earldom in October 1723, aged 14. In 1744, he was appointed Lord-Lieutenant of Hertfordshire, a post he held until his death. He was also a Lord of the Bedchamber to George II.

Lord Cowper was twice married. He married firstly Lady Henrietta, daughter of Henry de Nassau d'Auverquerque in 1732. After her death in September 1747, he married secondly Lady Georgiana Caroline Carteret, daughter of John Carteret, and widow of John Spencer, on 1 May 1750. They lived at Upper Brook Street, Mayfair.

He died on 18 September 1764, aged 55, and was succeeded in the earldom by his son from his first marriage, George Clavering-Cowper. The Countess Cowper died on 21 August 1780.

== Relatives ==
Cowper Family Tree

William Cowper d. 1664; 1st Baronet of Ratling Court in the County of Kent	Martha Master
Joyce Hukeley; 1622–1669	John Cowper; 1613–1643	Sir Samuel Holled; 1619–1661	Anne Cowper d. 1664
William Cowper; 1639–1706; 2nd Baronet of Ratling Court	Sarah Cowper; 1644–1720
Baron Cowper of Wingham in the County of Kent, 1706; Earl Cowper and Viscount Fordwich, in the County of Kent, 1718
Elizabeth Culling; 1676–1703	William Cowper; 1665–1723; 1st Earl Cowper, etc., 3rd Baronet of Ratling Court	1) Judith Booth d. 1705	2) Mary Clavering; 1685–1724	also: Samuel Cowper; 1666 John Cowper; 1667–1686	Spencer Cowper; 1670–1728	Pennington; Goodere; 1667–1727
William Cowper; 1697–1719	Mary Cowper; 1700–1740	William Cowper; 1687–c. 1692	William Cowper; 1689–1740	Spencer Cowper; 1690	also: Spencer Cowper; 1691–1706 John Cowper; 1694–1756 Ashley Cowper; 1701–1768	Judith Madan; 1702–1781
Sarah Cowper; 1707–1764	William Clavering-Cowper; 1709–1764; 2nd Earl Cowper, etc., 4th Baronet of Ratling Court	Anne Cowper; 1710–1764	Spencer Cowper; 1713–1774	William Cowper; 1731–1800
George Nassau Clavering-Cowper; 1738–1789; 3rd Earl Cowper, etc., 5th Baronet of Ratling Court
George Augustus Clavering-Cowper; 1776–1799; 4th Earl Cowper, etc., 6th Baronet of Ratling Court	Peter Leopold Louis Francis Nassau; 1778–1837; 5th Earl Cowper, etc., 7th Baronet of Ratling Court
George Augustus Frederick Cowper; 1806–1856; 6th Earl Cowper, etc., 8th Baronet of Ratling Court
Francis Thomas de Grey Cowper; 1834–1905; 7th Earl Cowper, etc., 8th Baron Lucas, 3rd Baron Butler, 4th Lord Dingwall, 9th Baronet of Ratling Court	Florence Amabell Herbert	Auberon Edward William Molyneux Herbert; 1838–1906
Earldom of Cowper, Viscountcy of Fordwich, Barony of Cowper, Baronetcy of Ratlingcourt extinct, 1905
Auberon Thomas Herbert; 1876–1916; 9th Baron Lucas, 5th Lord Dingwall	Nan Ino Cooper; 1880–1958; 10th Baroness Lucas, 6th Lady Dingwall
Anne Rosemary Palmer d. 1991; 11th Baroness Lucas, 7th Lady Dingwall
Ralph Matthew Palmer b. 1951; 12th Baron Lucas, 8th Lord Dingwall

== Arms ==
Coat of arms of William Clavering-Cowper, 2nd Earl Cowper
Crest A lion's jamb erased Or holding a cherry branch Vert fructed Gules. Escutcheon Argent three martlets Gules on a chief engrailed of the last three annulets Or. Supporters Two dun horses close cropped (except a tuft on the withers) and docked a large blaze down the face a black list down the back and three white feet viz both hind and the near fore foot. Motto Tuum Est (It Is Thine)

Honorary titles
Preceded by The 3rd Earl of Essex	Lord-Lieutenant of Hertfordshire; 1744–1764	Succeeded by The 4th Earl of Essex
Peerage of Great Britain
Preceded by William Cowper	Earl Cowper; 1723–1764	Succeeded by George Nassau Clavering-Cowper
