= Spencer Cowper (priest) =

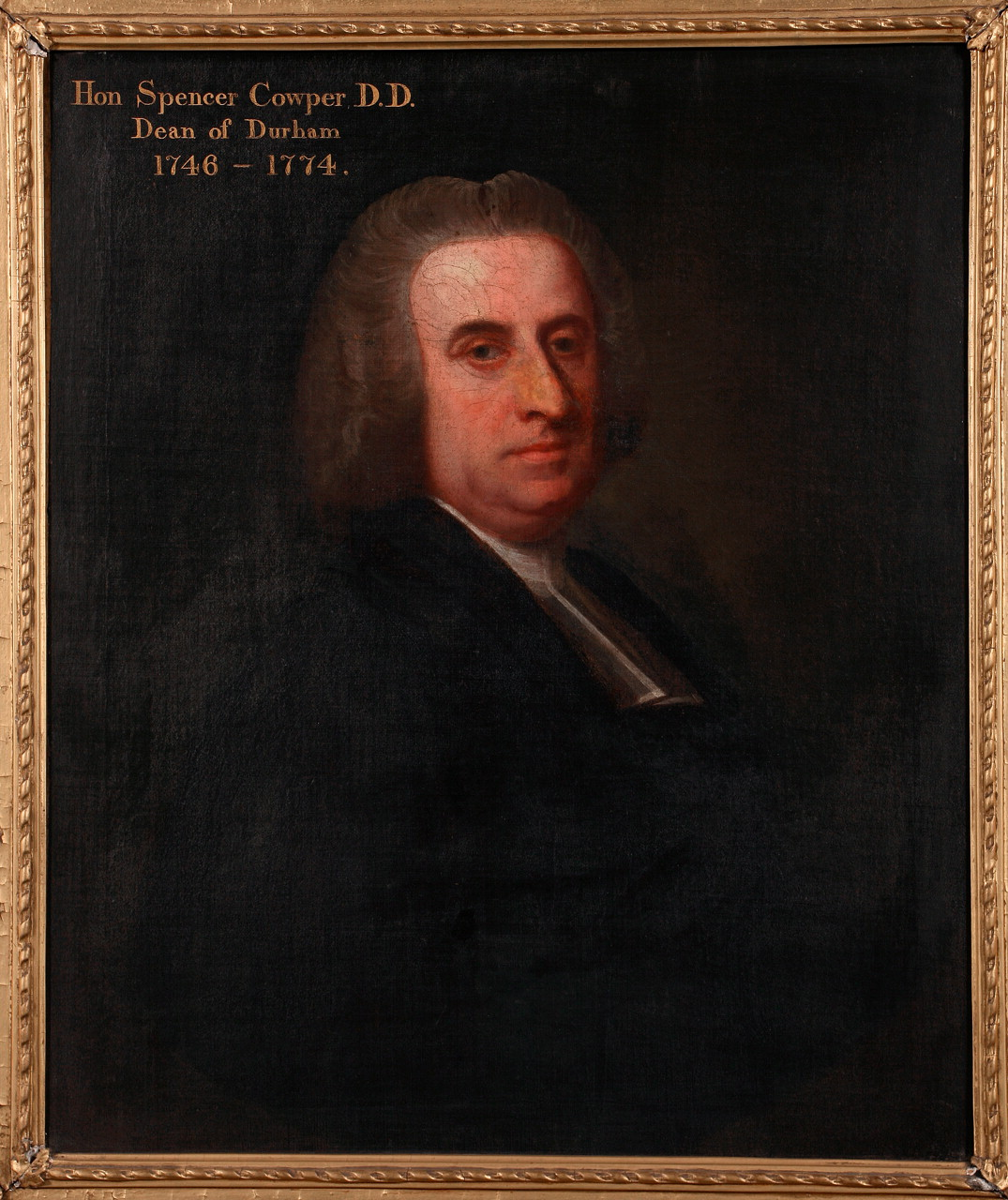
Spencer Cowper, dean of Durham 1746–1774. Unknown artist

Spencer Cowper (1713–25 March 1774) was Dean of Durham Cathedral from 1746 to 1774, known also for his early contributions to meteorology and his liking for poetry and music.

== Life and work ==
Cowper was the younger son of William Cowper, the first Earl and the first Lord Chancellor of Great Britain, and his second wife Mary Clavering. He was the cousin of the poet William Cowper.

He was educated at Exeter College, Oxford, matriculating in 1729 aged 16, graduating B.A. 1732, M.A. 1734, B.D. & D.D. 1746.

Along with his religious duties as Dean of Durham, he kept a naturalist's journal which included records of the local meteorology.

Some of Cowper's sermons survive, as does a collection of his letters published in 1956.

Cowper married Hon. Dorothy Townshend on 12 May 1743. Dorothy Townshend (5 May 1714-19 May 1779) was the eldest daughter of Charles, Viscount Townshend and his second wife, Dorothy Walpole.

== Relatives ==
Cowper Family Tree

William Cowper d. 1664; 1st Baronet of Ratling Court in the County of Kent	Martha Master
Joyce Hukeley; 1622–1669	John Cowper; 1613–1643	Sir Samuel Holled; 1619–1661	Anne Cowper d. 1664
William Cowper; 1639–1706; 2nd Baronet of Ratling Court	Sarah Cowper; 1644–1720
Baron Cowper of Wingham in the County of Kent, 1706; Earl Cowper and Viscount Fordwich, in the County of Kent, 1718
Elizabeth Culling; 1676–1703	William Cowper; 1665–1723; 1st Earl Cowper, etc., 3rd Baronet of Ratling Court	1) Judith Booth d. 1705	2) Mary Clavering; 1685–1724	also: Samuel Cowper; 1666 John Cowper; 1667–1686	Spencer Cowper; 1670–1728	Pennington; Goodere; 1667–1727
William Cowper; 1697–1719	Mary Cowper; 1700–1740	William Cowper; 1687–c. 1692	William Cowper; 1689–1740	Spencer Cowper; 1690	also: Spencer Cowper; 1691–1706 John Cowper; 1694–1756 Ashley Cowper; 1701–1768	Judith Madan; 1702–1781
Sarah Cowper; 1707–1764	William Clavering-Cowper; 1709–1764; 2nd Earl Cowper, etc., 4th Baronet of Ratling Court	Anne Cowper; 1710–1764	Spencer Cowper; 1713–1774	William Cowper; 1731–1800
George Nassau Clavering-Cowper; 1738–1789; 3rd Earl Cowper, etc., 5th Baronet of Ratling Court
George Augustus Clavering-Cowper; 1776–1799; 4th Earl Cowper, etc., 6th Baronet of Ratling Court	Peter Leopold Louis Francis Nassau; 1778–1837; 5th Earl Cowper, etc., 7th Baronet of Ratling Court
George Augustus Frederick Cowper; 1806–1856; 6th Earl Cowper, etc., 8th Baronet of Ratling Court
Francis Thomas de Grey Cowper; 1834–1905; 7th Earl Cowper, etc., 8th Baron Lucas, 3rd Baron Butler, 4th Lord Dingwall, 9th Baronet of Ratling Court	Florence Amabell Herbert	Auberon Edward William Molyneux Herbert; 1838–1906
Earldom of Cowper, Viscountcy of Fordwich, Barony of Cowper, Baronetcy of Ratlingcourt extinct, 1905
Auberon Thomas Herbert; 1876–1916; 9th Baron Lucas, 5th Lord Dingwall	Nan Ino Cooper; 1880–1958; 10th Baroness Lucas, 6th Lady Dingwall
Anne Rosemary Palmer d. 1991; 11th Baroness Lucas, 7th Lady Dingwall
Ralph Matthew Palmer b. 1951; 12th Baron Lucas, 8th Lord Dingwall
