= Sarah Cowper =

English diarist (1644–1720)

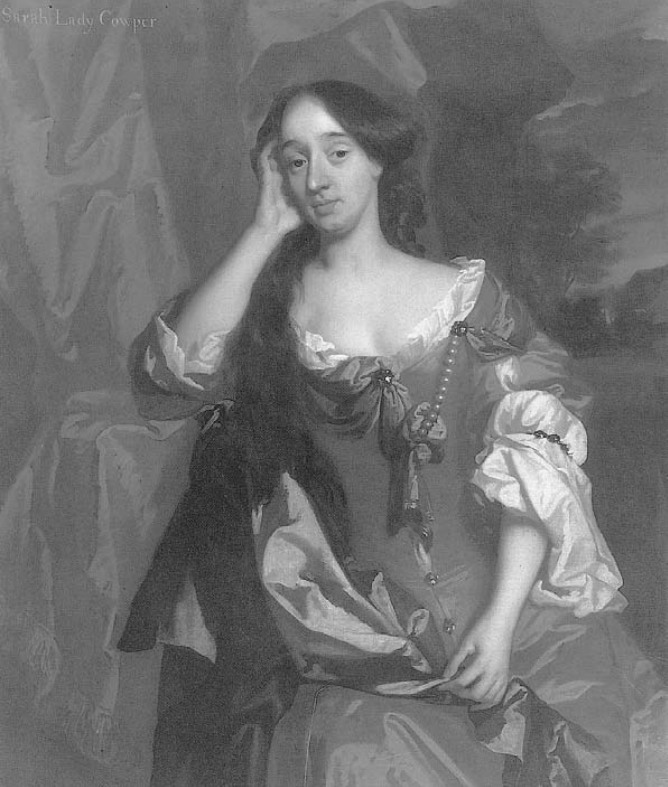
Sarah Cowper, in a 1665 portrait by Peter Lely, possibly painted to commemorate her marriage.

Sarah Cowper (née Holled, 14 February 1644 – 3 February 1720) was an English diarist.

== Early life ==
Sarah Holled was born in Eastcheap in London as the only child of merchant Samuel Holled. Both her parents died before she was 20. As the only heir to her parents' estate, she inherited roughly £1000. On 11 April 1664 Sarah married a lawyer, William Cowper, who at the end of that same year inherited the baronetcy Cowper, as well as properties in London and Kent from his grandfather. The couple would have four sons, notable among them William Cowper and Spencer Cowper.

However, the couple were extremely unhappy, with Sarah commenting on their complete emotional incompatibility by saying "Never met two more Averse than we in Humour, Passions, and Affections; our Reason and Sense Religion or Morals agree not". Her husband's income was inadequate for his rank, and so the couple maintained only modest rented homes in London, with a county seat of Hertford Castle, which at that time was small and run-down. This relative lack of wealth for the title of baron only aggravated marital disputes.

One response to her family situation and isolation was the compiling of a commonplace book, a collection of excerpts from her readings arranged under alphabetical headings.In it were preserved two manuscripts of Abraham Cowley's fragmentary epic The Civil War.

In 1699 Spencer was tried for the murder of a Quaker woman Sarah Stout. Although he was acquitted, his political career would never recover. It was in large part the response to the trial, combined with her dissatisfaction at her domestic conditions, that Sarah would begin writing he diary the following year.

== Diarist ==
Cowper would begin her diary in July 1700 and continue until 1716, when her failing eyesight and frail hands forced her to stop. For those 16 years it covered, in detail, all portions of her life, including her feelings about her family, the politics of the time and current gossip, all presented from within her sternly moralistic framework. Indead it seems that she originally treated the work as a spiritual diary, allowing her to vent her own frustrations as well as serving as a devotional aid. These two strands, the personal and the spiritual, would pervade the whole work.

Much of the work was compiled from other texts, incorporating the words of different writers seamlessly into her own observations, often without signalling to the reader when she was doing so. It was a habit that she admitted to; "if other men’s sentences were left out, the pages would be void". This 'borrowing' gave her observations literary cadence and lent them an air of authority.

== Later life ==
Sir William Cowper died on the 26 November 1706, making his widow financially independent. Sarah Cowper embarked on a programme of philanthropy. She enjoyed her widowhood greatly, commenting "Methinks I taste and feel that liberty is sweet". She spend most of her time reading, writing, visiting others and going to church. She died on 3 February 1720 and was buried St Mary's Church, Hertingfordbury, Hertfordshire, where a monument was erected praising her "industry, virtue, wisdom, and piety".

== Family ==
Her son William Cowper would become a politician and was the first Lord High Chancellor. Another of her sons Spencer Cowper was a lawyer and MP. Through Spencer she would be grand-mother to the poet Judith Madan and great-grand-mother to the hymn-writer William Cowper

Close relatives of Sarah Cowper

William Cowper (d. 1664); 1st Baronet of Ratling Court in the County of Kent	Martha Master
Joyce Hukeley (1622–1669)	John Cowper (1613–1643)	Sir Samuel Holled (1619–1661)	Anne Cowper (d. 1664)
William Cowper (1639–1706); 2nd Baronet of Ratling Court	Sarah Cowper (1644–1720)
Baron Cowper of Wingham in the County of Kent, 1706; Earl Cowper and Viscount Fordwich, in the County of Kent, 1718
Elizabeth Culling (1676–1703)	William Cowper (1665–1723); 1st Earl Cowper, 1st Viscount Fordwich, 3rd Baronet of Ratling Court	1) Judith Booth (d. 1705)	2) Mary Clavering (1685–1724)	Samuel Cowper (1666)	John Cowper (1667–1686)	Spencer Cowper (1670–1728)	Pennington; Goodere (1667–1727)
William Cowper (1697–1719)	Mary Cowper (1700–1740)	William Cowper (1687–1692?)	William Cowper (1689–1740)	Spencer Cowper (1690)	Spencer Cowper (1691–1706)	John Cowper (1694–1756)	Ashley Cowper (1701–1768)	Judith Madan (1702–1781)
Sarah Cowper (1707–1764)	William Clavering-Cowper (1709–1764); 2nd Earl Cowper, 2nd Viscount Fordwich, 4th Baronet of Ratling Court	Anne Cowper (1710–1764)	Spencer Cowper (1713–1774)	William Cowper (1731–1800)
George Nassau Clavering-Cowper (1738–1789); 3rd Earl Cowper, 3rd Viscount Fordwich, 5th Baronet of Ratling Court
George Augustus Clavering-Cowper (1776–1799); 4th Earl Cowper, 4th Viscount Fordwich, 6th Baronet of Ratling Court	Peter Leopold Louis Francis Nassau (1778–1837); 5th Earl Cowper, 5th Viscount Fordwich, 7th Baronet of Ratling Court
George Augustus Frederick Cowper (1806–1856); 6th Earl Cowper, 6th Viscount Fordwich, 8th Baronet of Ratling Court
Francis Thomas de Grey Cowper (1834–1905); 7th Earl Cowper, 7th Viscount Fordwich, 8th Baron Lucas, 3rd Baron Butler, 9th Baronet of Ratling Court, 4th Lord Dingwall	Florence Amabell Herbert	Auberon Edward William Molyneux Herbert (1838–1906)
Earldom of Cowper, Viscountcy of Fordwich, Barony of Cowper, Baronetcy of Ratlingcourt extinct, 1905
Auberon Thomas Herbert (1876–1916); 9th Baron Lucas, 5th Lord Dingwall	Nan Ino Cooper (1880–1958); 10th Baroness Lucas, 6th Lady Dingwall
Anne Rosemary Palmer (d. 1991); 11th Baroness Lucas, 7th Lady Dingwall
Ralph Matthew Palmer (b. 1951); 12th Baron Lucas, 8th Lord Dingwall
