= Earl Cowper =

Extinct title in the peerage of Great Britain

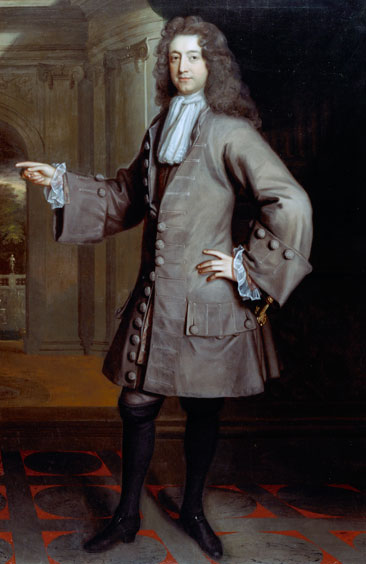
William Cowper, 1st Earl Cowper.

Earl Cowper (/ˈkuːpər/ KOO-pər) was a title in the Peerage of Great Britain. It was created in 1718 by George I for William Cowper, 1st Baron Cowper, his first Lord Chancellor, with remainder in default of male issue of his own to his younger brother, Spencer Cowper. Cowper had already been created Baron Cowper of Wingham in the County of Kent, in the Peerage of England on 14 December 1706, with normal remainder to the heirs male of his body, and was made Viscount Fordwich, in the County of Kent, at the same time as he was given the earldom, also Peerage of Great Britain and with similar remainder. He was the great-grandson of William Cowper, who was created a Baronet, of Ratling Court in the County of Kent, in the Baronetage of England on 4 March 1642. The latter was succeeded by his grandson, the second Baronet. He represented Hertford in Parliament. He was succeeded by his eldest son, the aforementioned William Cowper, the third Baronet, who was elevated to the peerage as Baron Cowper in 1706 and made Earl Cowper in 1718. In 1706 Lord Cowper married as his second wife Mary Clavering, daughter of John Clavering, of Chopwell, County Durham.

Lord Cowper was succeeded by his son, the second Earl. He assumed the additional surname of Clavering. Cowper married Lady Henrietta, younger daughter of Henry de Nassau d'Auverquerque, 1st Earl of Grantham, a relative of the Dutch House of Orange-Nassau, and a count of the Holy Roman Empire. On the death of Lady Cowper's elder sister, Lady Frances Elliot, in 1772, the second Earl's son, the third Earl became Lord Grantham's heir general, and on 31 January 1778 he was created a Prince of the Holy Roman Empire (Reichsfürst) by the Emperor Joseph II. He was allowed by George III to bear this title in Great Britain.

Lord Cowper's second son, the fifth Earl (who succeeded on the early death of his unmarried elder brother), was a Fellow of the Royal Society. The latter was succeeded by his eldest son, the sixth Earl. He represented Canterbury in Parliament and served as Lord Lieutenant of Kent. Lord Cowper married the Hon. Anne Florence, daughter of Thomas de Grey, 2nd Earl de Grey and 6th Baron Lucas. In 1859 she succeeded her father as 7th Baroness Lucas. They were both succeeded by their son, the seventh Earl and eighth Baron Lucas. He was a Liberal politician and served as Lord-Lieutenant of Ireland between 1880 and 1882. In 1871 managed to obtain a reversal of the attainder of the Scottish Lordship of Dingwall, which had been under attainder since 1715, and became the 4th Lord Dingwall as well. Lord Cowper was childless and on his death in 1905 the baronetcy of Ratling Court, the barony of Cowper, the viscountcy, the earldom and the Princely title became extinct. He was succeeded in the barony of Lucas of Crudwell and the lordship of Dingwall by his nephew; see Baron Lucas and Lord Dingwall for further history of these titles.

Several other members of the family may also be mentioned. Spencer Cowper, younger son of the second Baronet and brother of the first Earl, was a politician and barrister. He was the father of 1) Ashley Cowper, Clerk of Parliaments; 2) William Cowper, Clerk of Parliaments, the father of a) William Cowper, Member of Parliament for Hertford and b) Spencer Cowper, a Lieutenant-General in the British Army, who was the father of Henry Cowper, Clerk of the House of Lords; and 3) Reverend John Cowper, father of the poet William Cowper. William Cowper-Temple, 1st Baron Mount Temple, was the second son of the fifth Earl. The Hon. Henry Cowper, second son of the sixth Earl, was Member of Parliament for Hertfordshire for many years.

The family seat of the Earls Cowper was Panshanger in Hertfordshire. Other seats included Wrest Park in Bedfordshire, Brocket Hall in Hertfordshire, Melbourne Hall in Derbyshire and a townhouse at 4 St James's Square.

== Cowper baronets, of Ratling Court (1642) ==
- Sir William Cowper, 1st Baronet (1582–1664)
- Sir William Cowper, 2nd Baronet (1639–1706)
- Sir William Cowper, 3rd Baronet (1665–1723) (created Baron Cowper in 1706 and Earl Cowper in 1718)

== Earls Cowper (1718) ==
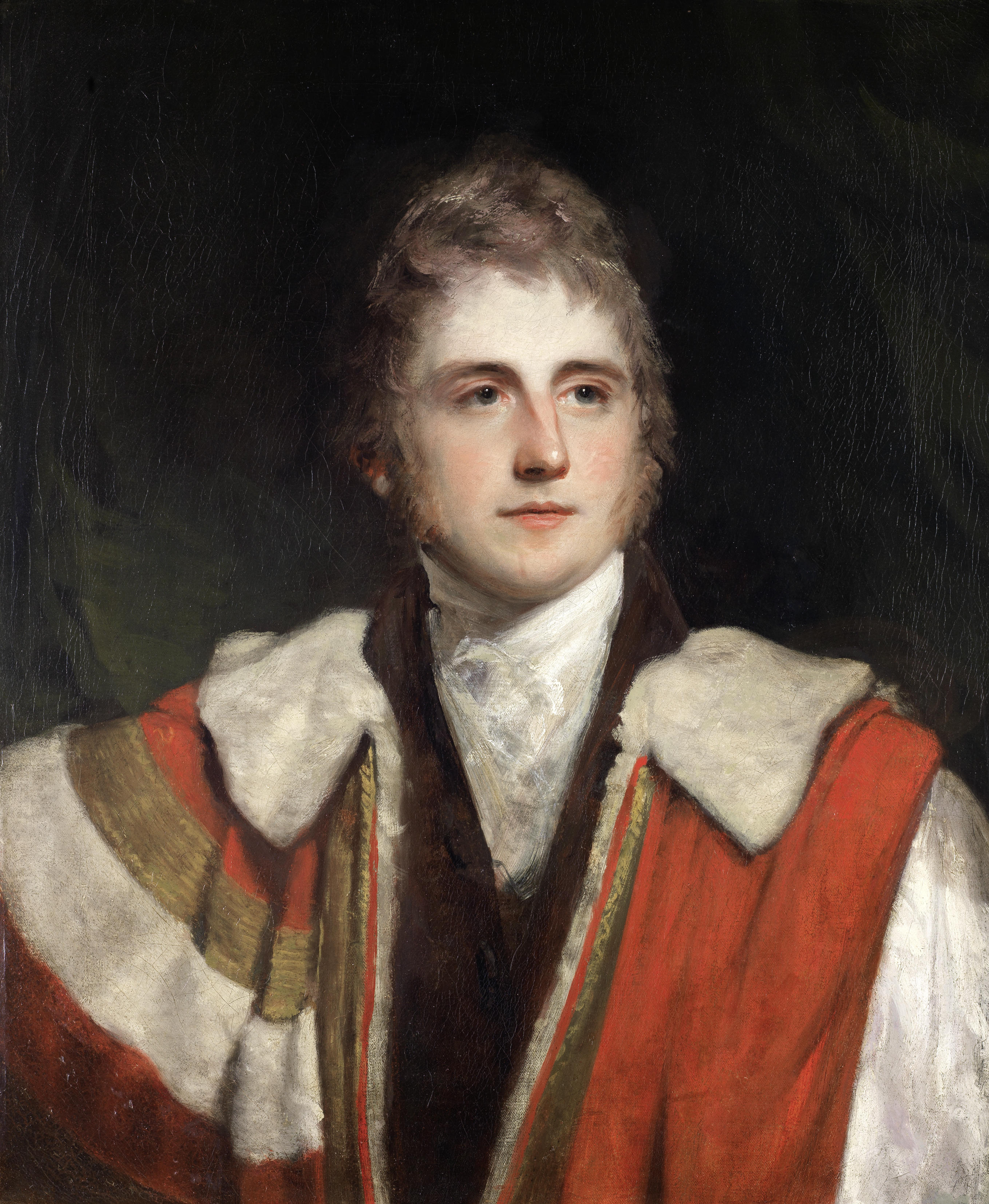
Peter Leopold Nassau Cowper, 5th Earl Cowper (attributed to John Hoppner)

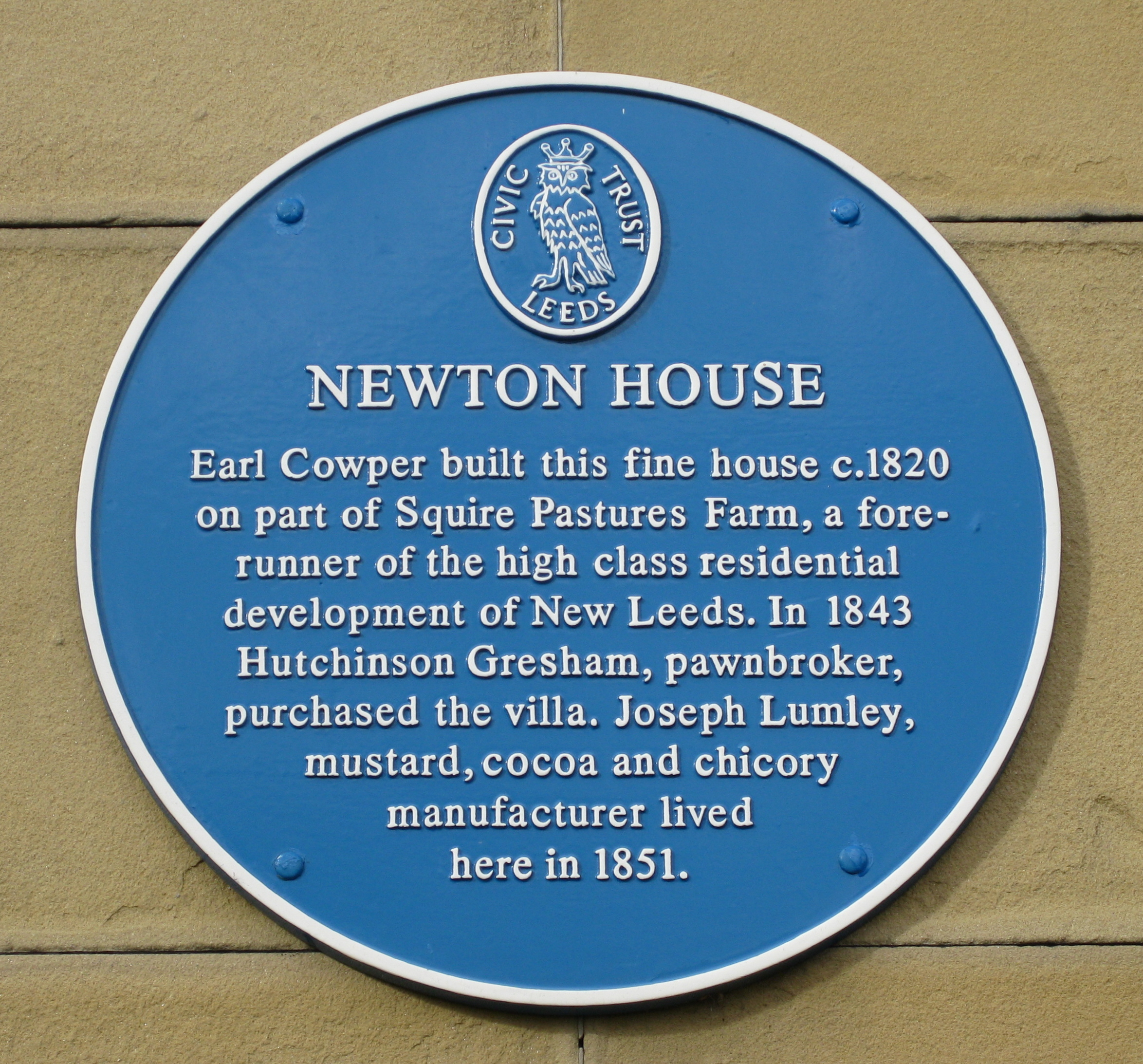
Newton House Blue Plaque Leeds

- William Cowper, 1st Earl Cowper, 1st Baron Cowper (1665–1723)
- William Clavering-Cowper, 2nd Earl Cowper (1709–1764)
- George Nassau Clavering-Cowper, 3rd Earl Cowper (1738–1789)
- George Augustus Clavering-Cowper, 4th Earl Cowper (1776–1799)
- Peter Leopold Louis Francis Nassau Clavering-Cowper, 5th Earl Cowper (1778–1837)
- George Augustus Frederick Cowper, 6th Earl Cowper (1806–1856)
- Francis Thomas de Grey Cowper, 7th Earl Cowper (1834–1905)

== Family tree ==
Cowper Family Tree

William Cowper d. 1664; 1st Baronet of Ratling Court in the County of Kent	Martha Master
Joyce Hukeley; 1622–1669	John Cowper; 1613–1643	Sir Samuel Holled; 1619–1661	Anne Cowper d. 1664
William Cowper; 1639–1706; 2nd Baronet of Ratling Court	Sarah Cowper; 1644–1720
Baron Cowper of Wingham in the County of Kent, 1706; Earl Cowper and Viscount Fordwich, in the County of Kent, 1718
Elizabeth Culling; 1676–1703	William Cowper; 1665–1723; 1st Earl Cowper, etc., 3rd Baronet of Ratling Court	1) Judith Booth d. 1705	2) Mary Clavering; 1685–1724	also: Samuel Cowper; 1666 John Cowper; 1667–1686	Spencer Cowper; 1670–1728	Pennington; Goodere; 1667–1727
William Cowper; 1697–1719	Mary Cowper; 1700–1740	William Cowper; 1687–c. 1692	William Cowper; 1689–1740	Spencer Cowper; 1690	also: Spencer Cowper; 1691–1706 John Cowper; 1694–1756 Ashley Cowper; 1701–1768	Judith Madan; 1702–1781
Sarah Cowper; 1707–1764	William Clavering-Cowper; 1709–1764; 2nd Earl Cowper, etc., 4th Baronet of Ratling Court	Anne Cowper; 1710–1764	Spencer Cowper; 1713–1774	William Cowper; 1731–1800
George Nassau Clavering-Cowper; 1738–1789; 3rd Earl Cowper, etc., 5th Baronet of Ratling Court
George Augustus Clavering-Cowper; 1776–1799; 4th Earl Cowper, etc., 6th Baronet of Ratling Court	Peter Leopold Louis Francis Nassau; 1778–1837; 5th Earl Cowper, etc., 7th Baronet of Ratling Court
George Augustus Frederick Cowper; 1806–1856; 6th Earl Cowper, etc., 8th Baronet of Ratling Court
Francis Thomas de Grey Cowper; 1834–1905; 7th Earl Cowper, etc., 8th Baron Lucas, 3rd Baron Butler, 4th Lord Dingwall, 9th Baronet of Ratling Court	Florence Amabell Herbert	Auberon Edward William Molyneux Herbert; 1838–1906
Earldom of Cowper, Viscountcy of Fordwich, Barony of Cowper, Baronetcy of Ratlingcourt extinct, 1905
Auberon Thomas Herbert; 1876–1916; 9th Baron Lucas, 5th Lord Dingwall	Nan Ino Cooper; 1880–1958; 10th Baroness Lucas, 6th Lady Dingwall
Anne Rosemary Palmer d. 1991; 11th Baroness Lucas, 7th Lady Dingwall
Ralph Matthew Palmer b. 1951; 12th Baron Lucas, 8th Lord Dingwall

== Arms ==
Coat of arms of Earl Cowper
Crest A lion's jamb erased Or holding a cherry branch Vert fructed Gules. Escutcheon Argent three martlets Gules on a chief engrailed of the last three annulets Or. Supporters Two dun horses close cropped (except a tuft on the withers) and docked a large blaze down the face a black list down the back and three white feet viz both hind and the near fore foot. Motto Tuum Est (It Is Thine)

== See also ==
- Baron Lucas
- Baron Butler
- Lord Dingwall
- Baron Mount Temple
