= Frances Maria Cowper =

British religious poet 1726–1797

Maria Frances Cecilia Cowper
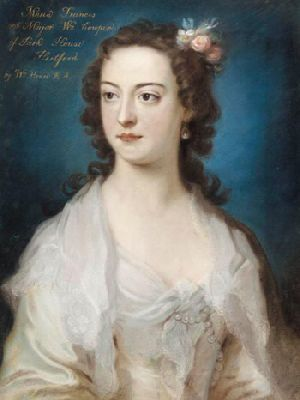
- Portrait of Mrs William Cowper, née Maria Frances Cecilia Madan, by William Hoare (1707—1792).
- Born: Frances Maria Cecilia Madan; 22 November 1726; Hertingfordbury Park, Hertfordshire, England
- Died: 15 October 1797 (aged 74); Devonshire Street, Paddington, Central London
- Resting place: South Audley Anglican Chapel, Grosvenor Square, Mount Street, Westminster
- Occupation: Writer
- Spouse: William Cowper (1721—1769)
- Children: Frances Cecilia Cowper; Charles Cowper; George Cowper; Spencer Cowper
- Relatives: Judith Madan (mother); Martin Madan(father); Martin Madan (brother); Spencer Madan (brother); Penelope Maitland (sister); Frederick Madan (brother); James Russel Madan (brother)
- Writing career
- Pen name: "a lady"
- Subject: Devotional

Frances Maria Cecilia Cowper (née Madan; 1726–1797), sometimes known as Maria Frances, was a religious poet and part of the Madan-Maitland literary coterie.

== Life ==
Frances Maria Madan was the second of nine children of Judith Madan [née Cowper] (1702–1781) and Colonel Martin Madan (1700–1756). She had weak eyesight as a child and was sent to a Mrs. King, an oculist, from whom she learnt to read and write. She also attended a school in Wells, Somerset and both her parents encouraged her literary interests. She and her sister Penelope were considered "beauties" in London society. Their relationship was studied as a revelatory example of the dynamics of friendship within the family cell in Georgian Britain. Her father travelled, the family's finances were strained, and her mother, whose literary career had ended with her marriage, suffered from recurrent depression. In 1749 or thereabouts, her mother joined the Methodist circle of John Wesley (1703–1791) and Selina Hastings (1707–1791). Cowper and her cousin, author and hymn-writer William Cowper, were coreligionists and from 1766 carried on a written correspondence "almost entirely of a religious character." On 5 Aug. 1749, she married another first cousin, also named William Cowper (1721–1769), of Hertingfordbury. The couple had six children:

- William Cowper (1750–1798)
- Maria Judith Cowper (born 1752)
- George Cowper (1754–1787)
- Frances Cecilia Cowper (1764–1849)
- Charles Cowper (born 1765)
- Spencer Cowper (died young)

Cowper's husband died after two decades of marriage and she lived a widow for another twenty-eight years, first in York and then, after 1772, in London.

== Poetry ==
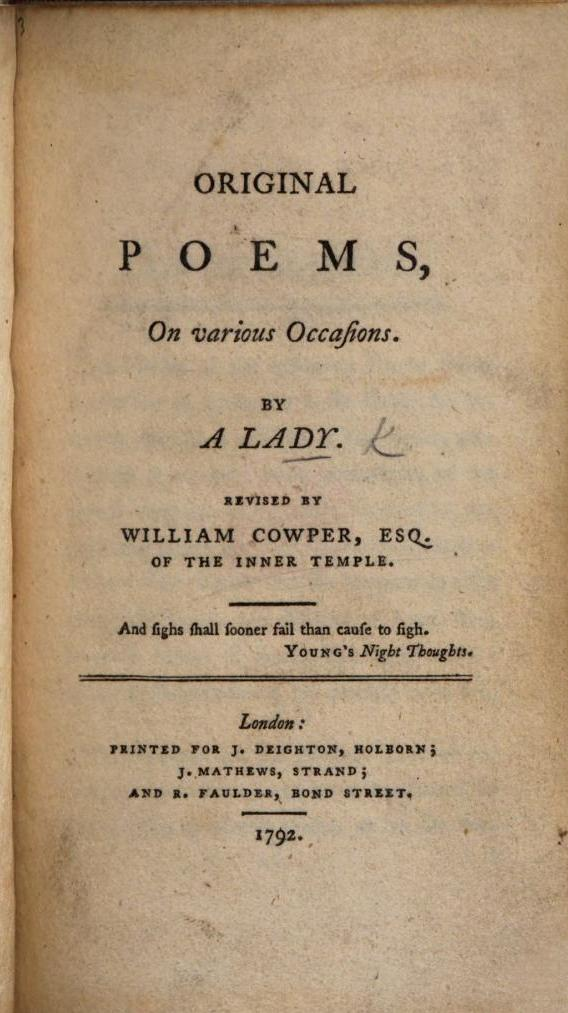
Title page of [Cowper, Frances Maria]. Original Poems, on Various Occasions. By a Lady. Revised by William Cowper, Esq. of the Inner Temple. Orig. pub. 1792; 2nd ed. London, 1807.

Cowper published one volume of religious verse, edited by her famous relative William Cowper. First published in 1792, there was a second edition in 1807 and a third in 1810, both posthumous, as well as two U.S. editions. Initially published as by "a lady," a footnote in the third edition misidentifies the author as "Mrs. Cowper, the aunt of the immortal poet" when she was in fact his cousin. The preface is short and offers a standard modest disclaimer that the poems are published at the request of friends. The collection comprises eighty-nine poems on Christian themes. In the preface and some of the poems, Cowper discusses the advantages of retirement from the world. Her hymn "My span of life will soon be done" has been published in seventy-eight hymnals:

My span of life will soon be done,
The passing moments say;
As length'ning shadows o'er the mead
Proclaim the close of day (ll. 1–4)

Two of her poems were anthologized in Roger Lonsdale's 1989 collection, Eighteenth-century women poets.

== Works ==
- Cowper, Frances Maria. Original poems, on various occasions. By a lady. Revised by William Cowper, Esq. of the Inner Temple. William Cowper, Editor. London: printed for J. Deighton, Holborn; J. Mathews, Strand; and R. Faulder, Bond Street, 1792.

== Etexts ==
- [Cowper, Frances Maria]. Original Poems, on Various Occasions. By a Lady. Revised by William Cowper, Esq. of the Inner Temple. Second Edition. London: For Mathews and Leigh, 18, Strand, R. Faulder, Bond Street, and J. Deighton, Cambridge. Orig. pub. 1792; 1807. (Full text at Google Books).

== See also ==
- Judith Madan
- William Cowper

== Notes and references ==
=== References ===
- "Cowper, Frances Maria." The Women's Print History Project, 2019, Person ID 1515. Accessed 2022-08-29.
- "Cowper, Maria Frances Cecilia," Jackson Bibliography of Romantic Poetry, UofToronto Libraries. Accessed 29 August 2022.
- Lonsdale, Roger. "Maria Frances Cecilia Cowper (née Madan) (1726—1797)." Eighteenth Century Women Poets: An Oxford Anthology. Ed. Roger Lonsdale. Oxford University Press, 1989. pp. 269–272.
- Rumbold, Valerie. "Madan [née Cowper], Judith (1702–1781), gentlewoman and poet." Oxford Dictionary of National Biography. 23. Oxford University Press. Date of access 30 Aug. 2022, <https://www-oxforddnb-com.wikipedialibrary.idm.oclc.org/view/10.1093/ref:odnb/9780198614128.001.0001/odnb-9780198614128-e-60780>
