= The Good Schools Guide =

British guide about schools

- Author: Ralph Lucas; Various
- Language: English
- Genre: Non-fiction
- Publisher: Lucas Publications
- Publication date: 1986–present
- Publication place: United Kingdom
- Media type: Print (Paperback) and Online
- Website: goodschoolsguide.co.uk

The Good Schools Guide is a guide to British schools, both state schools and private schools.

The guide's contributors are predominantly parents, but include researchers and former headteachers. It uses a conversational tone. Selection of schools is made by the guide, though featured schools may advertise on the website or in the print versions. Since the first edition in 1986, the full Guide has been republished 22 times. The editor-in-chief is Ralph Lucas.

Other publications produced by The Guide include The Good Schools Guide – Special Education Needs, The Good Schools Guide International, The Good Schools Guide London North, The Good Schools Guide London South and Uni in the USA. Good Schools Guide Education Consultants (formerly known as Advice Service) is its offshoot. The Good Schools Guide International (GSGI) is an online resource also edited by the guide with details of international schools in over 35 countries. The GSGI is aimed at English-speaking parents resident outside the UK who want an international education for their children.

The guide has been praised by The Daily Telegraph for giving "frank answers to the questions every parent asks". It has also been positively reviewed by the Financial Times and The Guardian.
