= Uni in the USA =

Guide to world universities for British students

Uni in the USA... and Beyond
- Author: Various
- Language: English
- Genre: Non-fiction
- Publisher: Galore Park Publishing
- Publication date: 2004–2012
- Publication place: United Kingdom
- Media type: Print (Paperback) and Internet

Uni in the USA is a guide to universities around the world aimed at prospective students in the United Kingdom. The guide is a subsidiary of The Good Schools Guide, and is published in paperback by Galore Park. It is also available as an ebook and as a subscription on the guide's website.

The guide was first published in 2004 with only 25 university reviews, all written by British Harvard student Alice Fishburn. Since then it has grown to include about 65 US universities and about 30 in other countries. The expanded edition was first published in paperback in 2012 as Uni in the USA... and Beyond, and contains forwards by the Fulbright Commission and by the headmaster of Wellington College, whose comments were noted by the Daily Telegraph and others.

Uni in the USA consists of reviews of universities. It also includes information on how to choose and apply to universities as a UK resident. The reviews are written by UK students. The guide also presents reference material for applying and paying for university in the United States from a British perspective. Unlike other guides to university, Uni in the USA is aimed at British students. Like the Good Schools Guide, Uni in the USA does not accept payment from any of the universities it reviews.

The guide was used by the Sutton Trust as part of their summer school program for helping British students apply to US universities.

In December 2012, Uni in the USA launched a forum service, intended for students, schools and others to discuss all aspects of studying abroad in America. Questions posted on the forum have received answers from experts on US applications.
