= Martin Madan =

English barrister, clergyman and writer

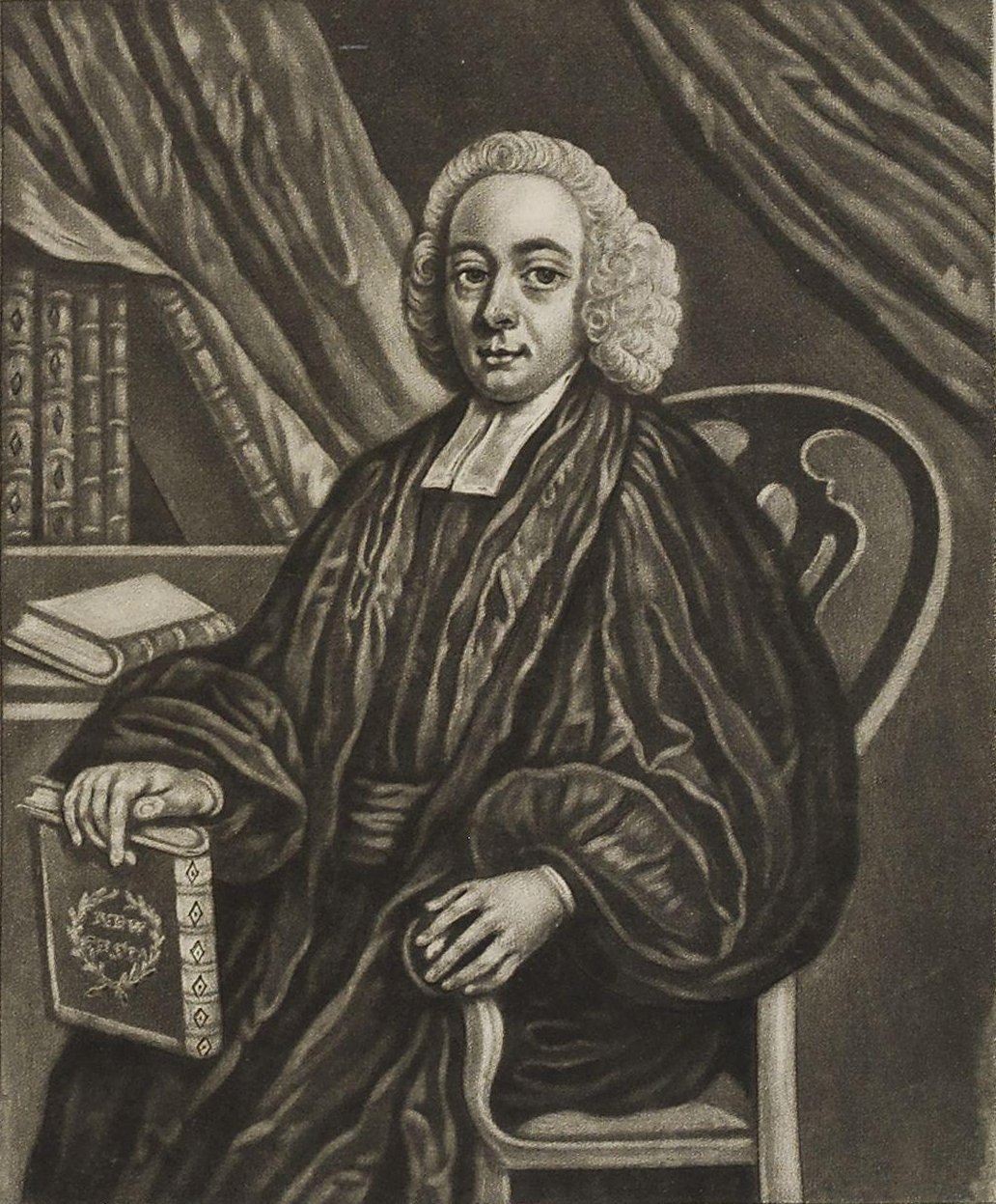
- Born: 1726
- Died: 2 May 1790
- Occupation: Clergy
- Known for: Thelyphthora, or A Treatise on Female Ruin

Martin Madan (1726 – 2 May 1790) was an English barrister, clergyman and writer, known for his contribution to Methodist music, 'The Lock Hospital Collection,' and later controversial views on marriage expressed in his book Thelyphthora.

== Life ==
He was the son of Judith Madan (née Cowper) the poet, and Colonel Martin Madan, and was educated at Westminster School, and at Christ Church, Oxford, where he graduated in 1746. In 1748 he was called to the bar, and for some time lived a very uninhibited life. He was persuaded to change his ways on hearing a sermon by John Wesley. He took holy orders, and was appointed chaplain to the London Lock Hospital. He was closely connected with the Calvinistic Methodist movement supported by the Countess of Huntingdon, and from time to time acted as an itinerant preacher. He was a first cousin of the poet William Cowper, with whom he had some correspondence on religious matters.

In 1767, much adverse comment was aroused by his support of his friend Thomas Haweis in a controversy arising out of the latter's possession of the living of All Saints Church, Aldwincle, Northamptonshire. Madan resigned his chaplainship and retired to Epsom.

He married Jane Hale, daughter of the eminent judge Sir Bernard Hale and his wife Anne Thoresby. They had five children. Jane's portrait was painted by Allan Ramsay. She died in 1794.

== Works ==
In 1760 Martin Madan published for the Lock Hospital the first edition of the collection of Psalms and Hymns Extracted from various Authors. He eventually published 11 editions, his last in 1787. Many of Madan's edits contained in those collections came into general use.

In 1780, Madan raised a storm of opposition by the publication of his Thelyphthora, or A Treatise on Female Ruin, in which he advocated polygamy as the remedy for evils he deplored. His arguments were based mainly on scriptural authority; but his book caused many angry replies. Amongst them was 'Anti-Thelyphthora' by his first cousin, the poet William Cowper, which he published anonymously. A fictional account of this event can be read in The Winner of Sorrow, a 2005 novel about the poet by Brian Lynch.

Nineteen attacks on Madan's treatise are catalogued by Falconer Madan in the Dictionary of National Biography.

Among other works was A New and Literal Translation of Juvenal and Persius (1789).

== See also ==
- Winston Blackmore
