= Martin Madan (politician) =

English politician

Colonel Martin Madan (1700–1756) was groom of the bedchamber to Frederick, Prince of Wales, and MP for Wootton Basset from 1742 to 1747. Madan also served as a colonel in the Dragoon Guards.

== Family ==
Martin Madan was married to Judith Madan (née Cowper) the English poet who called him Lysander in a poem entitled "To Lysander" composed on 3 October 1726, one year after the birth of their son.

Their sons included Rev. Martin Madan, author of Thelyphthora, a defence of polygamy, and the Right Rev. Spencer Madan, bishop successively of Bristol and Peterborough. Their elder daughter, Frances Maria Cowper, married William Cowper of Hertingfordbury, her first cousin; the younger daughter Penelope (died 22 December 1805), became the wife of General Sir Alexander Maitland (1728–1820). Madan was the grandfather of General Frederick Maitland.

Madan died at Bath 4 March 1756.

Parliament of the United Kingdom
Preceded by John Harvey-Thursby and Robert Neale	Member of Parliament for Wootton Basset; 1742–1747; With: Robert Neale (1742–1747)	Succeeded by John Probyn and Thomas Estcourt Cresswell
