= Panshanger =

English manor in Hertfordshire, UK

Coordinates: 51.8023°N 0.1305°W

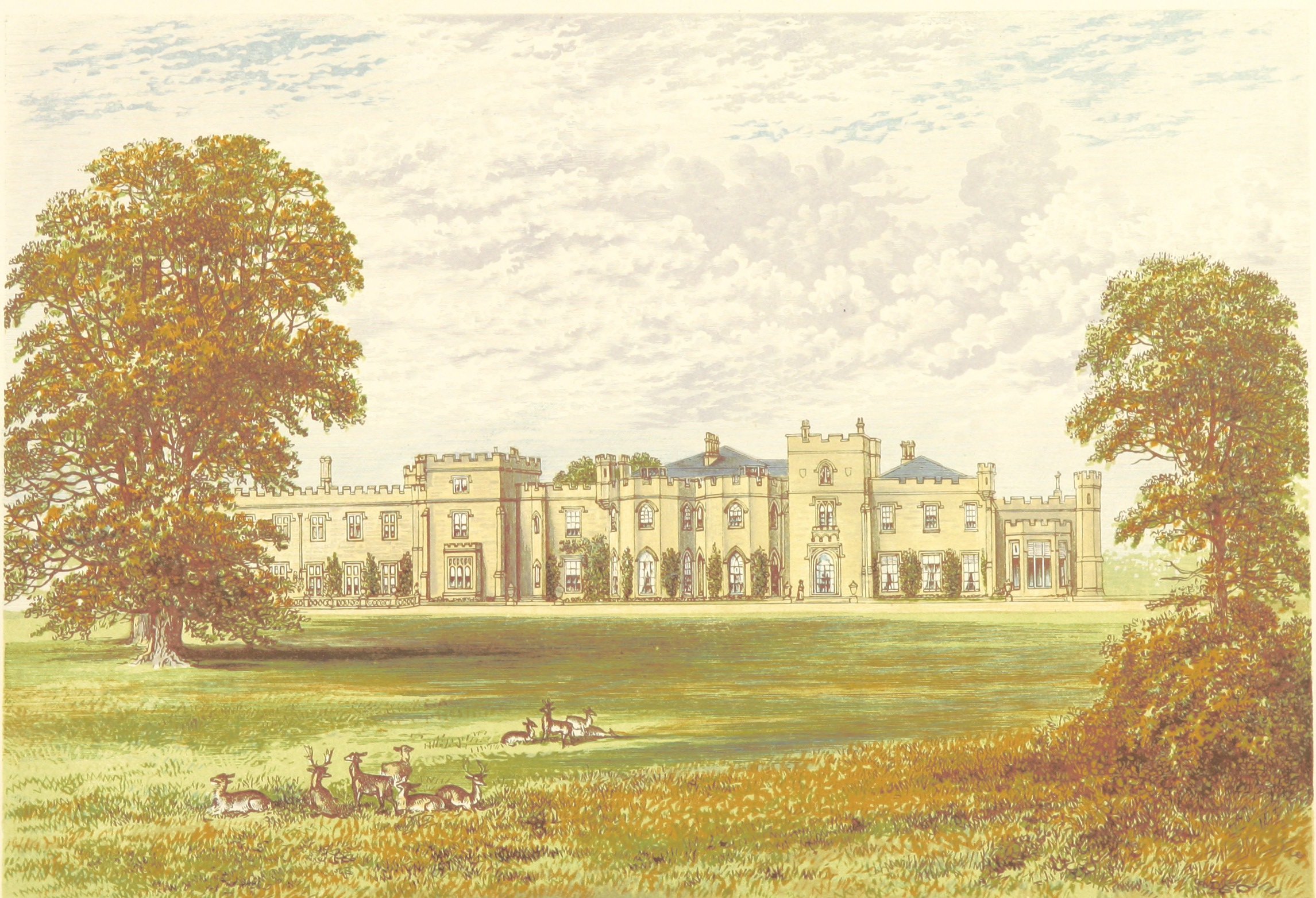
Panshanger House in 1868

Panshanger was a large country house located between the outer edge of Hertford and Welwyn Garden City in Hertfordshire, England. It was demolished between 1953 and 1954 after it failed to be sold.

== History ==
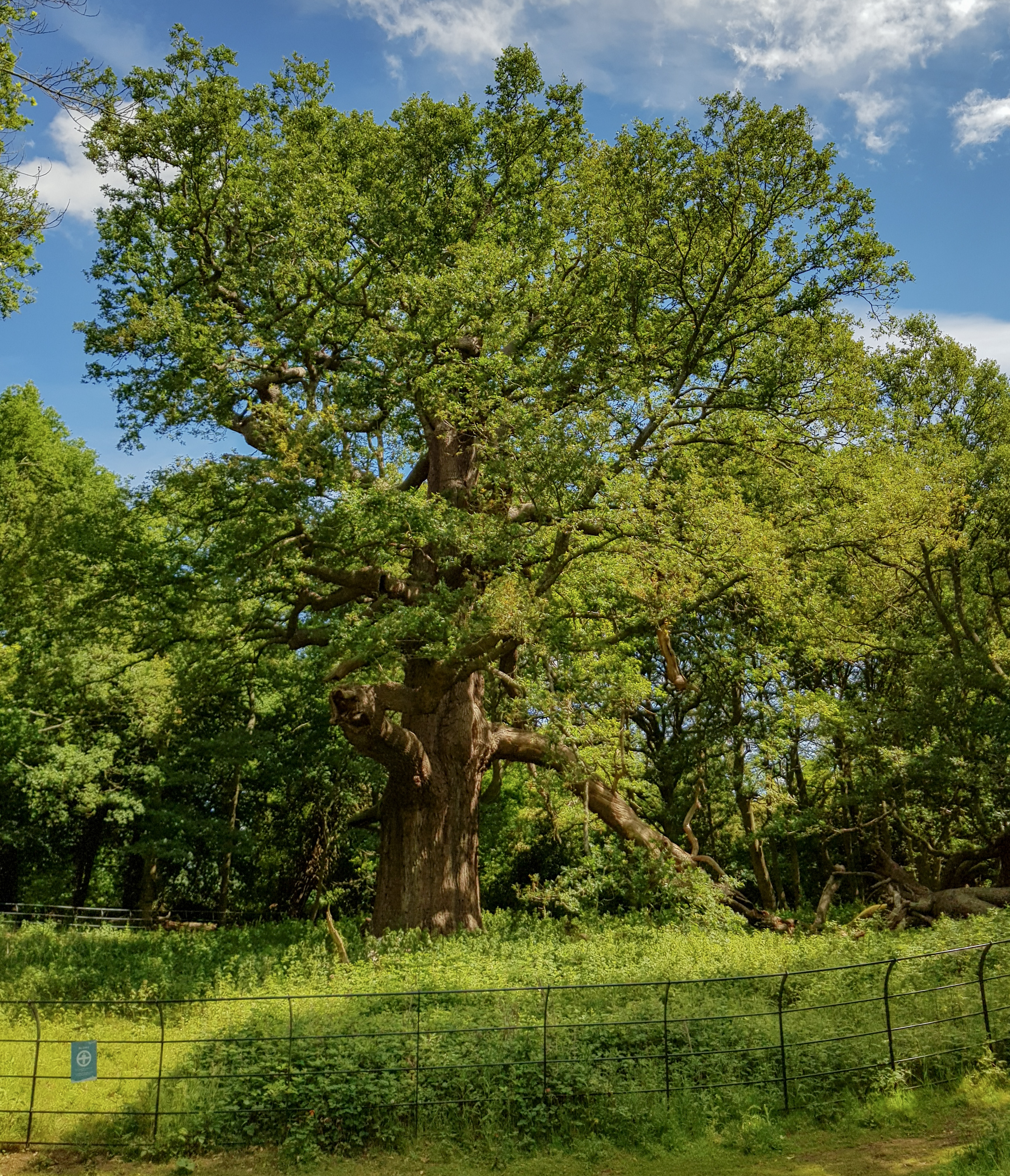
Panshanger Great Oak

Earl Cowper, who later became Lord Chancellor of Great Britain, acquired the Cole Green estate c. 1700. He remodelled the estate in 1704 and made alterations to the house in 1711. The 2nd Earl Cowper then had Capability Brown landscape the gardens in 1756. The park was further landscaped with advice from Humphry Repton, starting in 1799. The 5th Earl Cowper commissioned Samuel Wyatt and then William Atkinson to design a new house in a slightly different location in Regency-Gothic style; construction work started on site in 1806. The new house was situated beside a crest in the River Mimram, and built in the Gothic Revival style.

The house was damaged by fire in 1855, and required rebuilding which finished in 1859. By 1883, the 7th Earl Cowper had become one of the wealthiest landowners in the country, owning 37,869 acres (15,325 ha) of land. Upon his death in 1905, the estate was inherited by Ethel Grenfell, Baroness Desborough. A large portion of the outlying farms forming part of the estate was sold by auction to Ebenezer Howard on 30 May 1919, and it was this land on which Welwyn Garden City was built. After she died in 1952 with no heir, the estate was sold in lots by auction the following year, but there was no interest in the house itself and it was demolished between 1953 and 1954. The remnants of the house and its orangery are still visible today on satellite imagery.

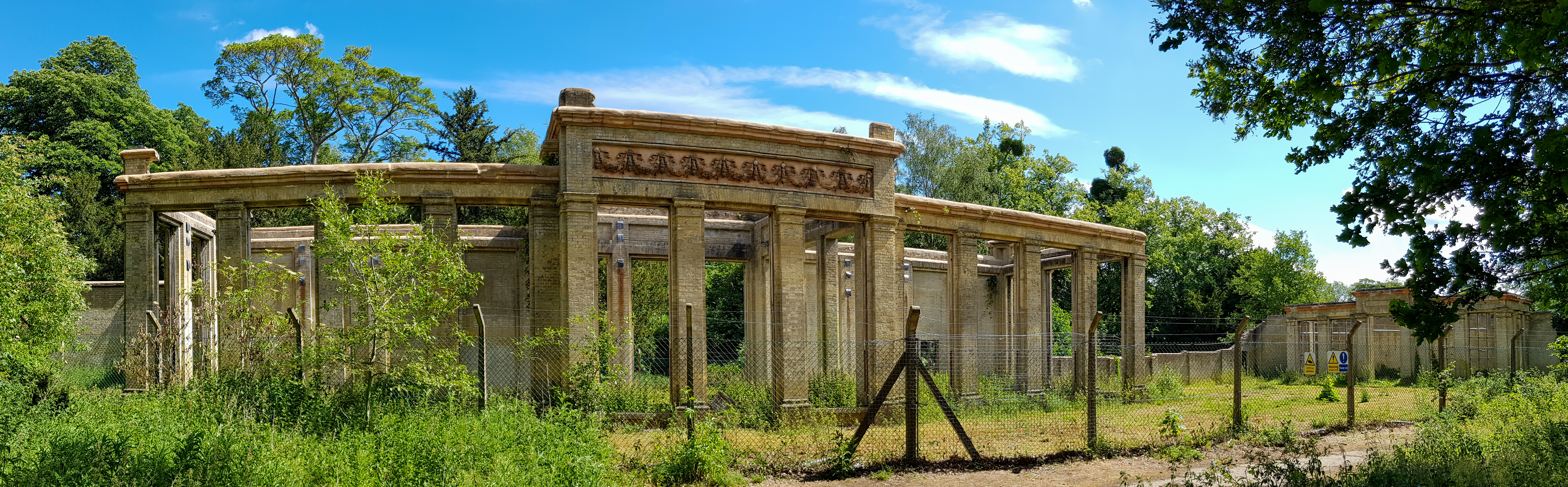
Panshanger orangery

The park contains the largest maiden (not pollarded) oak in the country, with a circumference of 7.6 metres. It is believed to have been planted by Queen Elizabeth I. Acorns from the tree have been used as seedlings for notable oaks in other parts of the country, such as the Prince Consort Oak in the Forest of Dean. Winston Churchill planted a sapling from the tree in the park and the tree can still be seen in the grounds.

== Panshanger Park ==
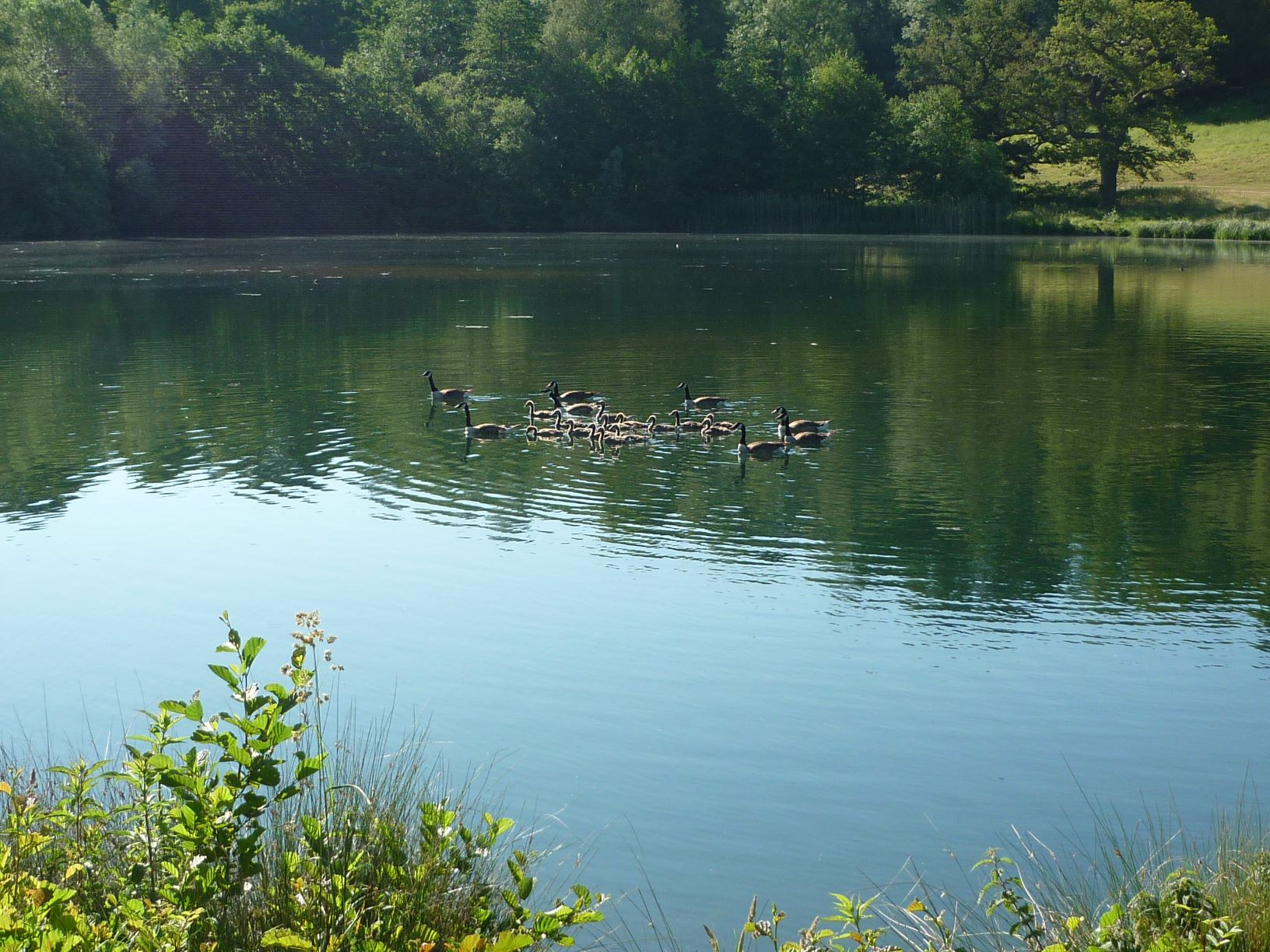
Geese at Panshanger nature reserve

Panshanger Park is owned by Tarmac which extracts sand and gravel from the site. Although Panshanger House was demolished, the orangery, nursery garden wall, stables, and a number of cottages and estate buildings remain, which were all made Grade II* listed in 1987.

200 acres (81 ha) of the 1,000-acre (400 ha) country park and nature reserve has been open to the public since 31 March 2014. The park consists of wetlands, grasslands and reedbeds which serve as a home for a wide variety of damselfly and dragonfly species. The park is also home to kingfishers, waterfowl and osprey. The rest of the site will be opened as gravel extraction is completed.

== Panshanger district ==
The Panshanger district of Welwyn Garden City, and the nearby Panshanger Aerodrome, are named after the Panshanger estate. However, Panshanger Park does not lie within the Panshanger ward of Welwyn Garden City, nor indeed any part of Welwyn Garden City. It actually lies within the parishes of Hertford and Hertingfordbury.

== Sources ==
- Media related to Panshanger at Wikimedia Commons
