= Mary Cowper =

English courtier and diarist

The Right Honourable The Countess of Cowper
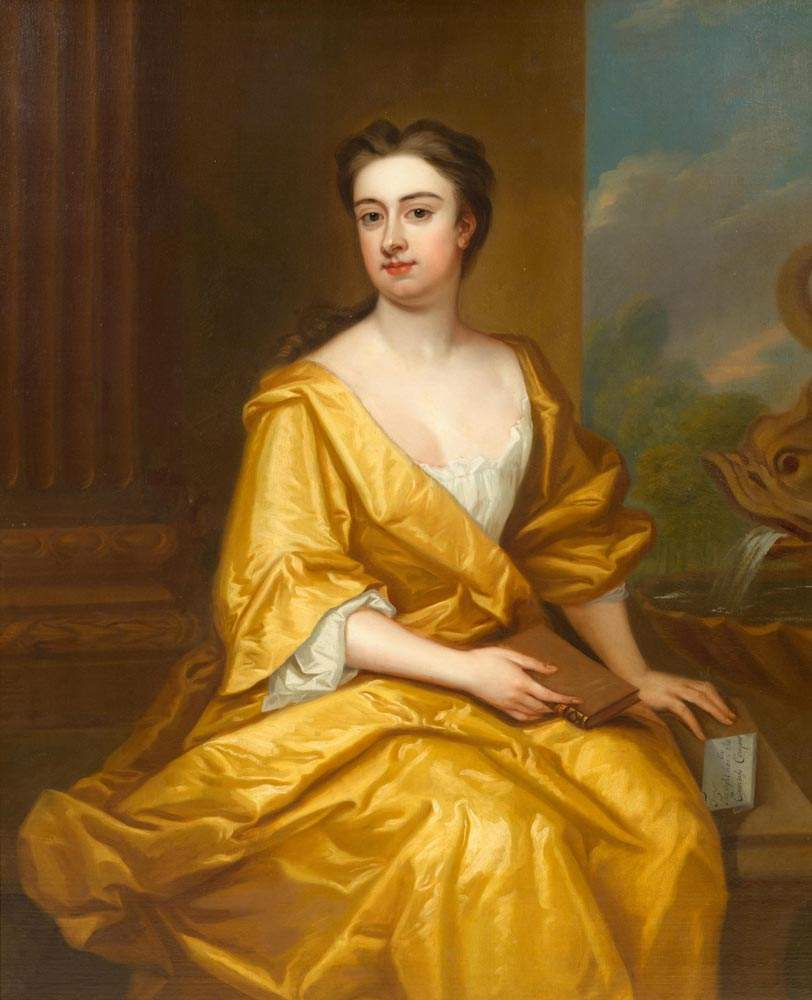
- Portrait of Mary Cowper by (Circle of) Sir Godfrey Kneller.
- Born: Mary Clavering; 1685
- Died: February 5, 1724 (aged 38–39)

Mary, Countess Cowper (née Clavering) (1685 – February 5, 1724) was an English courtier and diarist, and the wife of William Cowper, 1st Earl Cowper.

== Biography ==
In September 1706, William Cowper secretly married the beautiful 20-year-old Mary, daughter of John Clavering, of Chopwell, Durham after his first wife died in 1705. Her half-sister was Ann Liddell whose letters recorded contemporary politics. In November of the same year, her husband succeeded to his father's baronetcy and in December he was raised to the peerage as Baron Cowper of Wingham, Kent.

In May 1707 Queen Anne in Council named William Cowper the first Lord High Chancellor of Great Britain. The Queen came to have a high regard for Cowper: she valued his advice and, due to his exceptionally youthful appearance, called him "her schoolboy". When his party went out of office in 1710 the Queen pleaded with Cowper not to resign, and only accepted his resignation with "tears in her eyes". He was later appointed one of the Lords Justices responsible for governing the country until George I arrived in England after Queen Anne's death. King George reappointed him Lord Chancellor, and for a time placed great trust in him, although they later quarrelled.

As Lady of the Bedchamber to Caroline, Princess of Wales, Mary immediately put her new-found access to court and her fluent French to use in acting as a go-between for her husband (who did not speak French). The first day she attended the Princess she gave her Bernstorff’s 'A Treatise on the State of Parties' which she 'had transcribed and translated for my Lord, in French and English, to give the King.'

In April 1718 Earl Cowper resigned his office as Lord Chancellor, and retired to Cole Green, his home in the country, but Mary remained at Court as Lady of the Bedchamber to Caroline, Princess of Wales and in her diaries wrote an account of events at Court. Some of the diaries were destroyed by Mary but the diaries covering October 1714 to October 1716 and April 1720 to May 1720 were later published by Charles Spencer Cowper in 1864. She could write vividly and with a dry wit, as when describing the unfortunate marriage of John Hartstonge, Bishop of Derry to Isabelle Danvers, a lady of the Royal Bedchamber. Although a close friend of Sarah Churchill, Duchess of Marlborough, she noted that Sarah "loved power even more than the Duke (her husband) did".

Lord Cowper died after a short illness on 10 October 1723 at his residence, Cole Green, in Hertford, built by himself in 1704 (demolished by the 5th Earl in 1801 on advice from the landscape designer Repton) nearby to which the later mansion of Panshanger was built in 1840 and also demolished in 1954. Mary died grief-stricken several months later. The 1st Earl and Mary left two sons and two daughters; their younger son, Spencer, became Dean of Durham. Mary was the great aunt (by marriage) of William Cowper, the poet.

== Sources ==
- Boyle, Mary Louisa. Biographical catalogue of the portraits at Panshanger, the seat of Earl Cowper. London, Elliot Stock, 1885
- Oxford Dictionary of National Biography.
- Diary of Mary, Countess Cowper (1864)
