= George Clavering-Cowper, 3rd Earl Cowper =

British politician

The Right Honourable Prince of the Holy Roman Empire The Earl Cowper
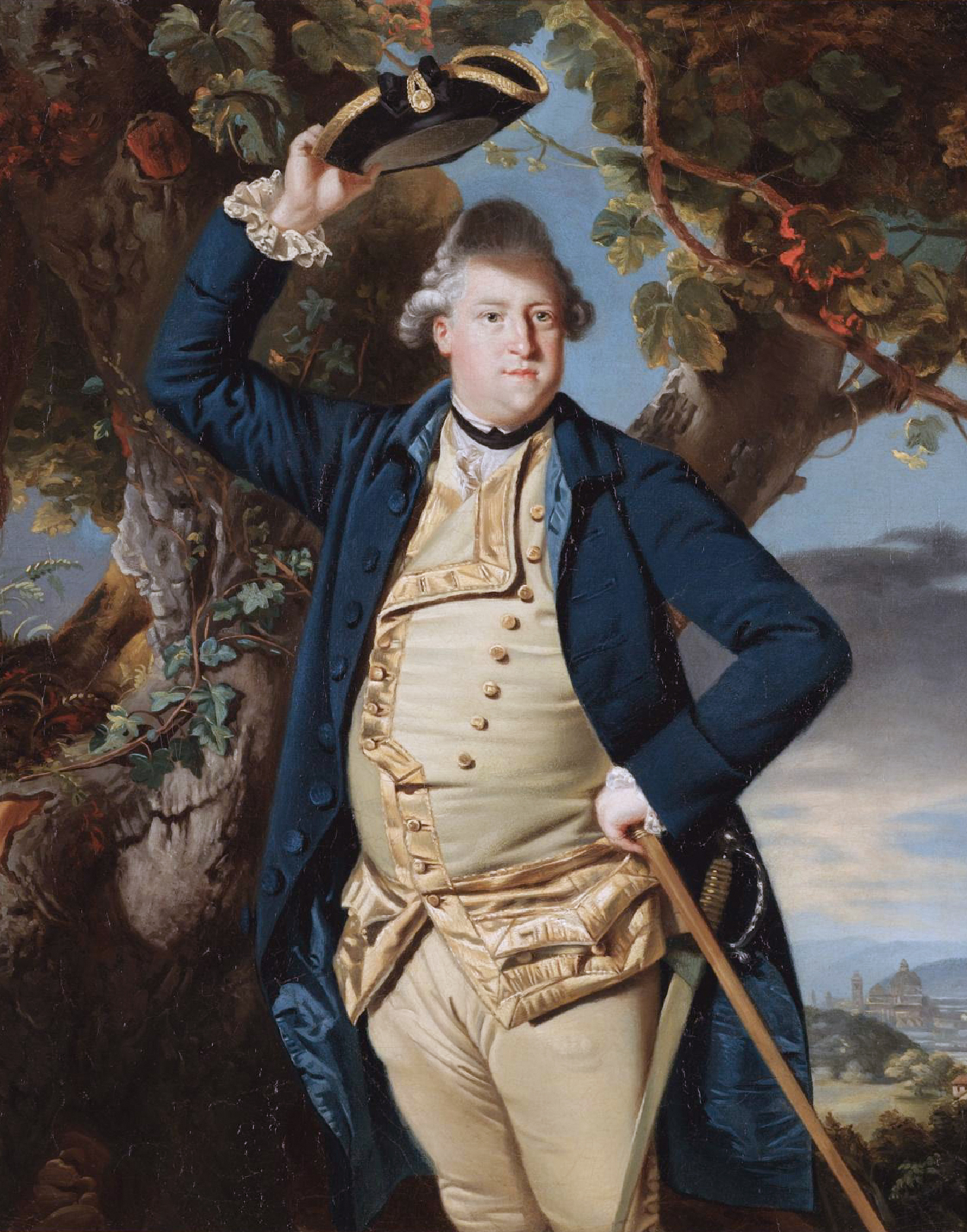

Member of Parliament for Hertford
- In office 1759–1761
- Preceded by: George Harrison
- Succeeded by: Timothy Caswall; John Calvert

Personal details
- Born: 26 August 1738 England
- Died: 22 December 1789 (aged 51) Florence, Grand Duchy of Tuscany
- Resting place: Hertford, England
- Spouse: Hannah Clavering-Cowper née Gore
- Children: 3

George Nassau Clavering-Cowper, 3rd Earl Cowper, Prince of Nassau d'Auverquerque Knight of St. Hubert FRS (26 August 1738 – 22 December 1789) was an expatriate British nobleman, art collector, and absentee politician. Going on the Grand Tour as a young man, he emigrated to Florence. Despite becoming a member of parliament (representing Hertford in the House of Commons for two years) and later inheriting lands and the title of Earl Cowper in England, he remained in Italy. He amassed a valuable art collection and became a Prince of the Holy Roman Empire. He was a patron of the arts and science.

== Biography ==
George Nassau Clavering-Cowper was the son of the 2nd Earl Cowper and the godson of George II. He was educated at Eton College. His education was planned to be completed with a Grand Tour. This rite of passage for British aristocrats required that they tour the continent in the company of a tutor.

Clavering-Cowper was at the time known as Viscount Fordwich. Accompanied by his tutor, they travelled through France, the Netherlands, and Germany before Clavering-Cowper studied for two years in Switzerland. Unlike other Grand Tourers, Fordwich was independent of his parents as he had inherited a fortune from his grandfather the Earl of Grantham in 1754. The tourers arrived in Florence on 7 July 1759.

Fordwich's father was expectant of his return; he arranged for him to be elected as the Member of Parliament for Hertford in December 1759. However, Fordwich was establishing himself in Florentine society. By the following year his tutor, Jean Chastellain, asked for and was given permission to abandon his charge. The 2nd Earl gave Chastellain leave to return to his home town of Vevey.

=== Florence ===
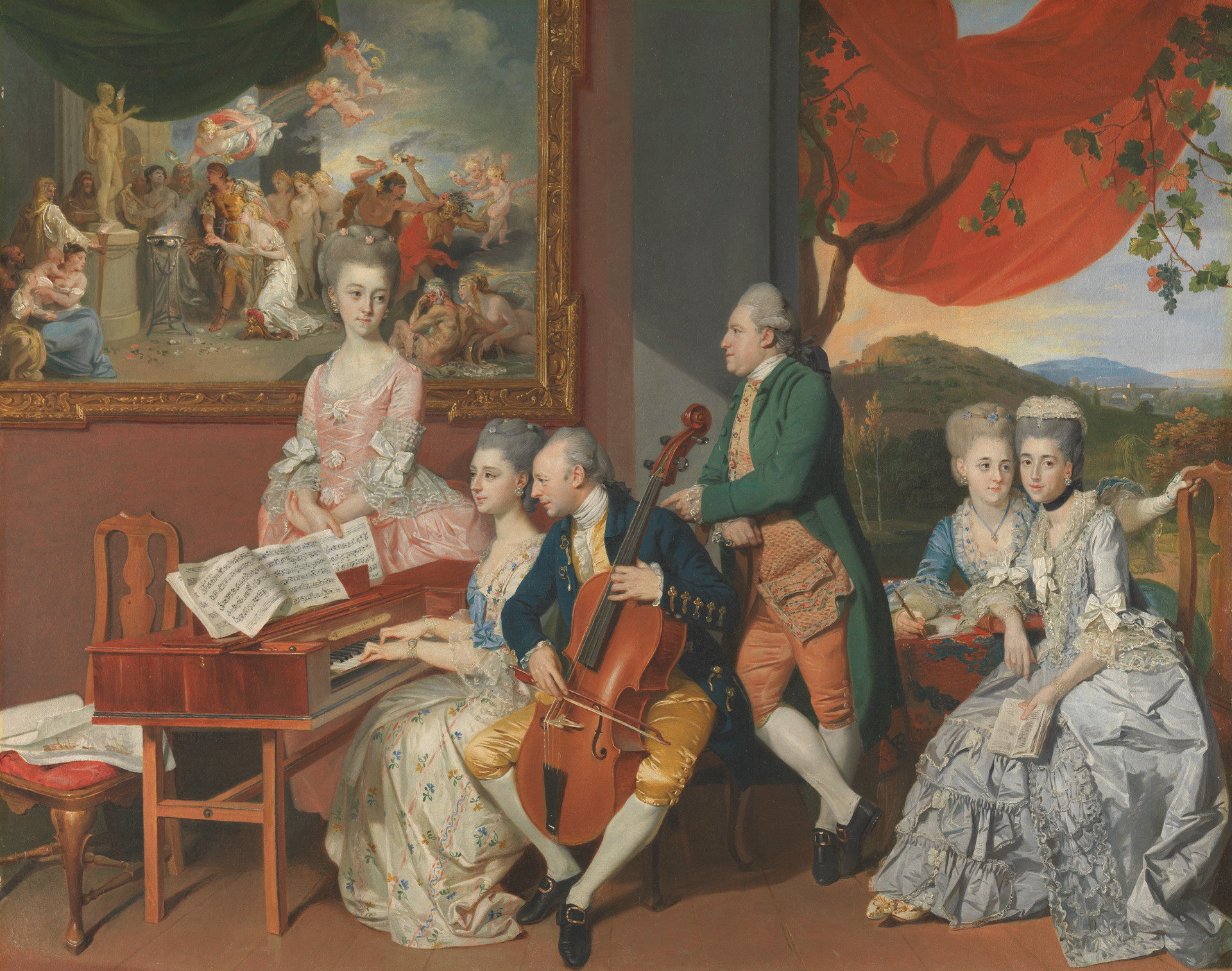
The Gore Family by Zoffany. Gore's daughter, Hannah, is top left, Gore is centre and the aspiring groom is the standing figure on the right

He married the sixteen-year-old Hannah Anne Gore, daughter of Charles Gore, on 2 June 1775. In 1780, he bought the Villa Palmieri in Fiesole which overlooks Florence. They had three children; the first two would become the 4th and 5th Earl Cowper.

Although George Nassau Cowper had left his family's seats and his father in England he was not without connections. He had ambitions to be the British representative in Florence and he tried to increase his favour with the King. He sent a small painting to the King and also sent further copies of Italian works to England. The job he wanted was held by Sir Horace Mann who despite not being as much in favour as Cowper, was still the British Resident in Florence. Cowper was successful in other ways. He was instrumental in having a monument erected on Machiavelli's tomb, in the Church of Santa Croce.

By the intercession of Grand Duke Leopold, Cowper was able to get himself made a Prince of the Holy Roman Empire (Sacri Romani Imperii Princeps de Cowper) by Emperor Joseph II. His title was Prince of Nassau d'Auverquerque (his mother had been born Henrietta Nassau d'Auverquerque) and he was given royal license by George III to adopt this title.

Cowper only returned to England once, and this was only a brief visit after over thirty years' absence. His arrival was so remarkable that it was reported on by Horace Walpole. In a letter to Sir Horace Mann he recounts that he was astounded to see

an English Earl who is more proud of a pinchbeck Principality and a paltry order from Wirtemberg than he was of being a Peer of Great Britain when Great Britain was something.

== Art collection and patronage ==
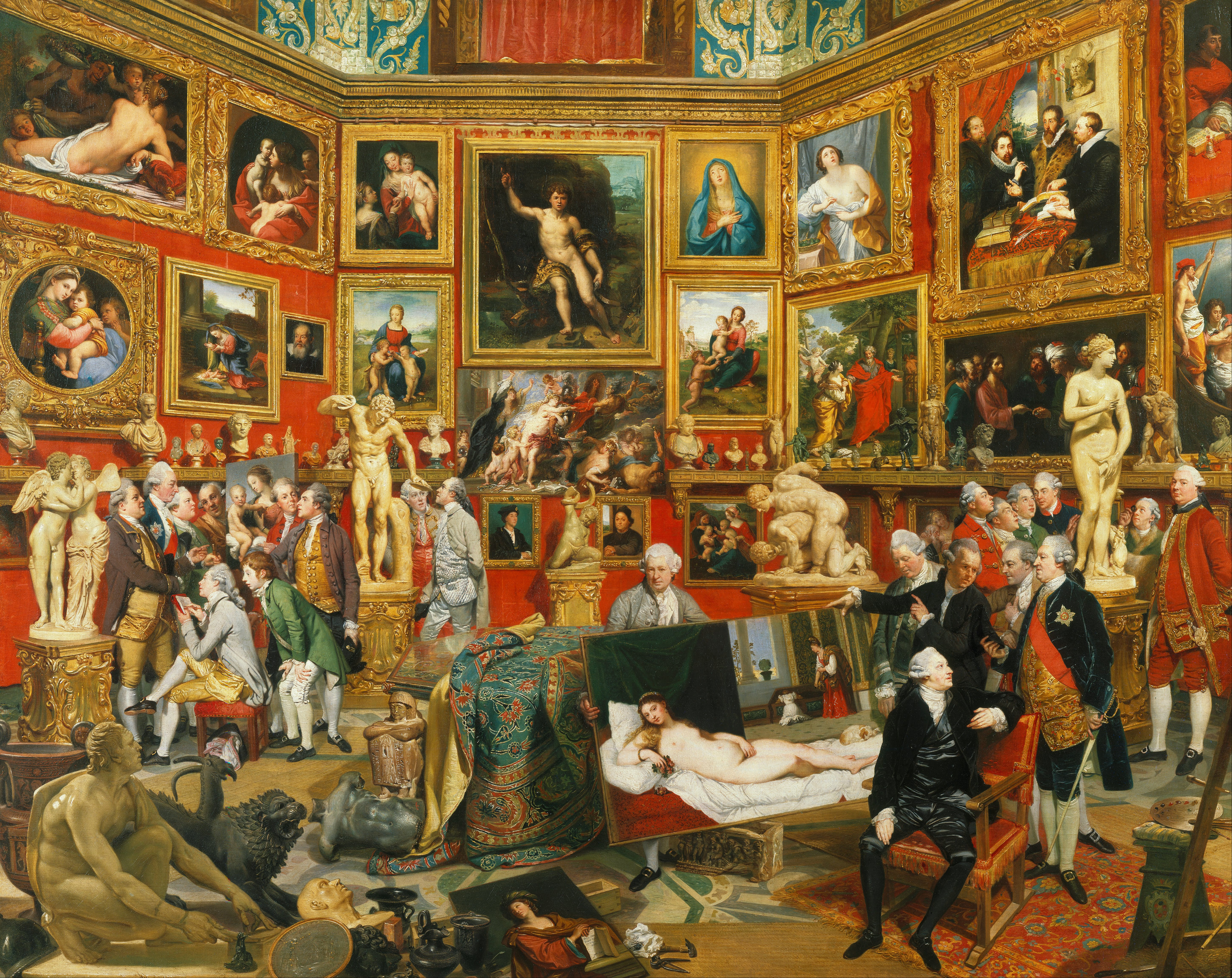
Tribuna of the Uffizi

Cowper's art collection absorbed a great deal of his time and money. Among his most notable possessions are two paintings by Raphael. The first is known as the Small Cowper Madonna and the other is the Niccolini-Cowper Madonna. The latter is particularly remarkable in that he can be seen evaluating the painting in another painting. Tribuna of the Uffizi shows Cowper looking at the painting as it is offered by Johann Zoffany. Zoffany had purchased the painting from the Niccolini family in 1782 and sold it to Cowper in 1785.

Zoffany was in Italy on a mission by the British royal family to paint the Tribuna. Zoffany lost his role as a court painter due to including figures in this commission. Reputedly Cowper was thought acceptable but the others were considered unnecessary.

Cowper used Zoffany's expertise to increase the value of his art collection in addition to giving him commissions. Zoffany painted Cowper and his fiancée separately as well as including both of them in the painting commissioned by his father-in-law, Charles Gore. Artists Cowper collected included Giuseppe Antonio Fabrini, the landscape artist Francesco Zuccarelli, Jakob Philipp Hackert, and Hugh Primrose Dean. After 1778, Cowper purchased Fra Bartolommeo's Holy Family in 1779 and he also supported Joseph Plura, Innocenzo Spinazzi, Hugh Douglas Hamilton, and Jacob More.

Cowper's support was not limited to artists. His cousin William Cowper, a noted poet, received a generous annuity from him. Count Volta also received a complete laboratory from Cowper and they also had continued correspondence as Cowper assisted Volta with translation for a paper presented to the Royal Society.

== Death and legacy ==
Cowper died on 22 December 1789 at age 51. His body was returned to England and buried in Hertford. His title was taken by his eldest son, George Augustus Cowper, 4th Earl Cowper. His second son, Peter Leopold Louis Francis Nassau Cowper, 5th Earl Cowper, inherited that title in 1799 and held it for another 38 years, which denied the title to Cowper's last son, Edward Spencer.

== Titles and honours ==
- Earl Cowper, Viscount Fordwich, Baron Cowper of Wingham, Baronet (1764)
- Fellow of the Royal Society (1777)
- Prince of the Holy Roman Empire (1778)
- Knight of St. Hubert (1785)

== Arms ==
Coat of arms of George Clavering-Cowper, 3rd Earl Cowper
Crest A lion's jamb erased Or holding a cherry branch Vert fructed Gules. Escutcheon Argent three martlets Gules on a chief engrailed of the last three annulets Or. Supporters Two dun horses close cropped (except a tuft on the withers) and docked a large blaze down the face a black list down the back and three white feet viz both hind and the near fore foot. Motto Tuum Est (It Is Thine)

Parliament of Great Britain
Preceded by George Harrison	Member of Parliament for Hertford; Together with Nathaniel Brassey; 1759–1761	Succeeded by Timothy Caswall; John Calvert
Peerage of Great Britain
Preceded by William Clavering-Cowper	Earl Cowper; 1764–1789	Succeeded by George Augustus Clavering-Cowper
