= Judith Madan =

English poet (1702–1781)

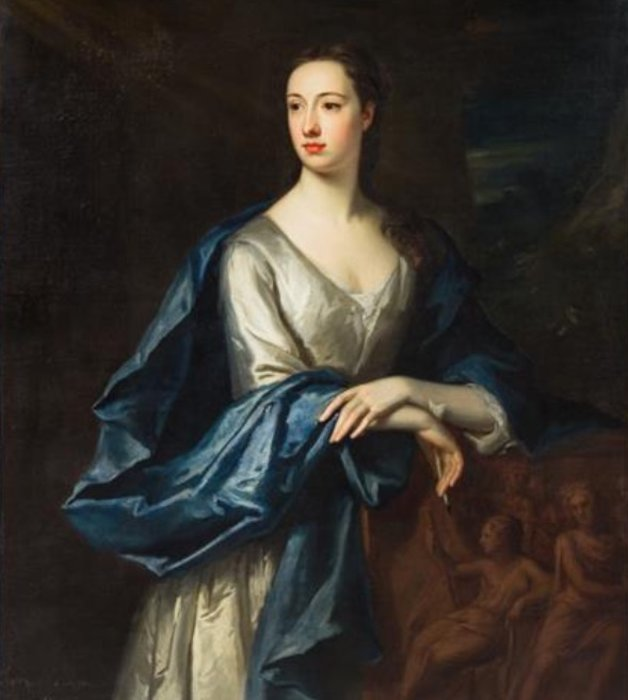
- Born: 26 August 1702
- Died: 7 December 1781 (aged 79)
- Spouse: Martin Madan
- Children: 9, including Martin Madan, Spencer Madan, and Frances Maria Cowper
- Parent(s): Spencer Cowper and Pennington Goodere
- Writing career
- Genre: poetry

Judith Madan (née Cowper; 26 August 1702 – 7 December 1781) was an English poet. She was the granddaughter of the diarist Sarah Cowper and aunt of the poet William Cowper. She was a correspondent, admirer and protégé of Alexander Pope prior to her marriage, and she composed an admired early-gothic work, Abelard to Eloisa, as a response to Pope's Eloisa to Abelard.

== Life and career ==
She was the only daughter of Spencer Cowper, lawyer, judge (Justice of the Common Pleas), and member of Parliament, and his wife Pennington (née Goodere; died 1727), and is thought to have been born at the family seat, Hertingfordbury Park, Hertfordshire, England. She began writing poetry as a teenager.

While still Judith Cowper she met Alexander Pope sometime after the 1717 publication of his Eloisa to Abelard. She wrote Abelard to Eloisa, a prominent example of the many literary responses to Pope's work, before she was 20. It was the first English adaptation of the story to feature Abelard as the speaker. Her original characterisation of Abelard prefigures the Romantic era hero: Laura Alexander, the academic and fellow of the American Society for Eighteenth-Century Studies, says of Cowper's creation that, "in her Abelard [is] an original pathos figure that anticipates the "man of feeling" in later eighteenth-century literature of sensibility." Cowper and Pope corresponded until at least 1723 and in his letters he took an interest in her poetry, sometimes setting her literary projects, apparently as a salve or preventive to the depression from which Cowper periodically suffered. Cowper seems to have written little following her marriage.

On 7 December 1723 Cowper married Colonel Martin Madan, groom of the bedchamber to Frederick, Prince of Wales, and MP for Wootton Basset. He died at Bath on 4 March 1756, aged 53. Their sons included Rev. Martin Madan, author of Thelyphthora a defence of polygamy, and the Right Rev. Spencer Madan, bishop successively of Bristol and Peterborough. Their elder daughter, Frances Maria Cowper, married William Cowper of Hertingfordbury, her first cousin; a volume of Frances Maria Cowper's religious verse, attributed to "a lady" and revised by her famous poet cousin, was published in 1792. Their younger daughter, Penelope (died 22 December 1805), became the wife of General Sir Alexander Maitland (1728–1820). Judith was the aunt of William Cowper the English poet and hymnodist, and grandmother of General Frederick Maitland.

She died at Stafford Row, Westminster on 7 December 1781.

== Works ==
- Abelard to Eloisa, written 1720, published in 1728 in William Pattison's Poetical Works and thereby misattributed to him initially
- The Progress of Poetry (1721)
- Verses on the Death of Mr. Hughes, works in honour of the poet John Hughes, written 1719-1730
