= Auberon Herbert, 9th Baron Lucas =

British politician

The Right Honourable The Lord Lucas PC
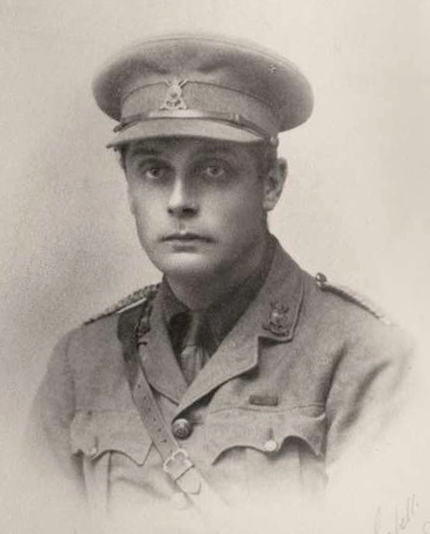

President of the Board of Agriculture and Fisheries
- In office 6 August 1914 – 25 May 1915
- Monarch: George V
- Prime Minister: H. H. Asquith
- Preceded by: Walter Runciman
- Succeeded by: The Earl of Selborne

Personal details
- Born: 25 May 1876 United Kingdom
- Died: 3 November 1916 (aged 40) near Bapaume, Somme, France
- Cause of death: Died of wounds
- Resting place: VIII C 17, HAC Cemetery, Écoust-Saint-Mein, France
- Party: Liberal
- Parents: Auberon Herbert (father); Lady Florence Cowper (mother)
- Relatives: Nan Ino Herbert (sister)
- Education: Bedford School
- Alma mater: Balliol College, Oxford
- Military career
- Allegiance: United Kingdom
- Branch: British Army; Royal Flying Corps
- Rank: Captain
- Units: Hampshire Yeomanry
- Conflicts: Second Boer War; World War I; Battle of the Somme; Battle of the Ancre (WIA)

Auberon Thomas Herbert, 9th Baron Lucas and 5th Lord Dingwall, PC (25 May 1876 – 3 November 1916), who preferred to be known as Bron Herbert, was a radical British Liberal politician and fighter pilot. He was a member of H. H. Asquith's cabinet as President of the Board of Agriculture and Fisheries between 1914 and 1915.

== Background and education ==
Herbert was the second but eldest surviving son of the Hon. Auberon Herbert, younger son of Henry Herbert, 3rd Earl of Carnarvon. His mother was Lady Florence, daughter of George Cowper, 6th Earl Cowper. He was educated at Bedford School and Balliol College, Oxford.

== Military and political career ==
Herbert was a captain in the Hampshire Yeomanry (Carabiniers) and worked as a war correspondent during the Boer War, where he was wounded and lost a leg. His elder brother, Rolf, had died in 1882 and his mother in 1886 and so in 1905 (as the nearest heir) he inherited the barony of Lucas and the lordship of Dingwall (which are able to pass through female lines) from his maternal uncle, the 7th Earl Cowper. However, it was not until 1907 that he was confirmed in the titles by the Committee for Privileges of the House of Lords and allowed to take his seat in the House of Lords.

Lucas was private secretary to Richard Haldane, the Secretary of State for War, from 1907 to 1908. In April 1908 he was appointed to his first ministerial post as Under-Secretary of State for War (with a seat on the Army Council) by H. H. Asquith, a post he held until 1911. He was Under-Secretary of State for the Colonies between March and October 1911 and then served as Parliamentary Secretary to the Board of Agriculture and Fisheries from 1911 to 1914.

He was sworn of the Privy Council in 1912 and in August 1914 he entered the cabinet as President of the Board of Agriculture and Fisheries. However, he did not hold office in the coalition government formed by Asquith in May 1915. Lucas also played a prominent part in David Lloyd George's Land Campaign.

Lucas served as a captain in the Royal Flying Corps in the First World War. On 3 November 1916, whilst flying over German lines in the vicinity of Bapaume, his aircraft was shot down by a German fighter aircraft. Lucas died of his wounds as a prisoner of war that same day, aged 40. His body was buried in a war grave at the village of Ecoust-Saint-Mein.

== Personal life ==
Lord Lucas never married. His titles passed to his sister, Nan Herbert.

== See also ==
- Wrest Park

== Notes ==
- Jones, H.A. "The War in the Air: Being the Story of the Part Played by the Royal Air Force in the Great War: Vol. II". History of the Great War. Oxford: The Clarendon Press, 1928.

Political offices
Preceded by The Earl of Portsmouth	Under-Secretary of State for War; 1908–1911	Succeeded by J. E. B. Seely
Preceded by J. E. B. Seely	Under-Secretary of State for the Colonies; 1911	Succeeded by The Lord Emmott
Preceded by Sir Edward Strachey, Bt	Parliamentary Secretary to the Board of Agriculture and Fisheries; 1911–1914	Succeeded by Sir Harry Verney, Bt
Preceded by Walter Runciman	President of the Board of Agriculture and Fisheries; 1914–1915	Succeeded by The Earl of Selborne
Peerage of England
Preceded by Francis Cowper	Baron Lucas; 1905–1916	Succeeded by Nan Ino Herbert
Peerage of Scotland
Preceded by Francis Cowper	Lord Dingwall; 1905–1916	Succeeded by Nan Ino Herbert
