= Ralph Palmer, 12th Baron Lucas =

British peer (born 1951)

The Right Honourable The Lord Lucas FCA
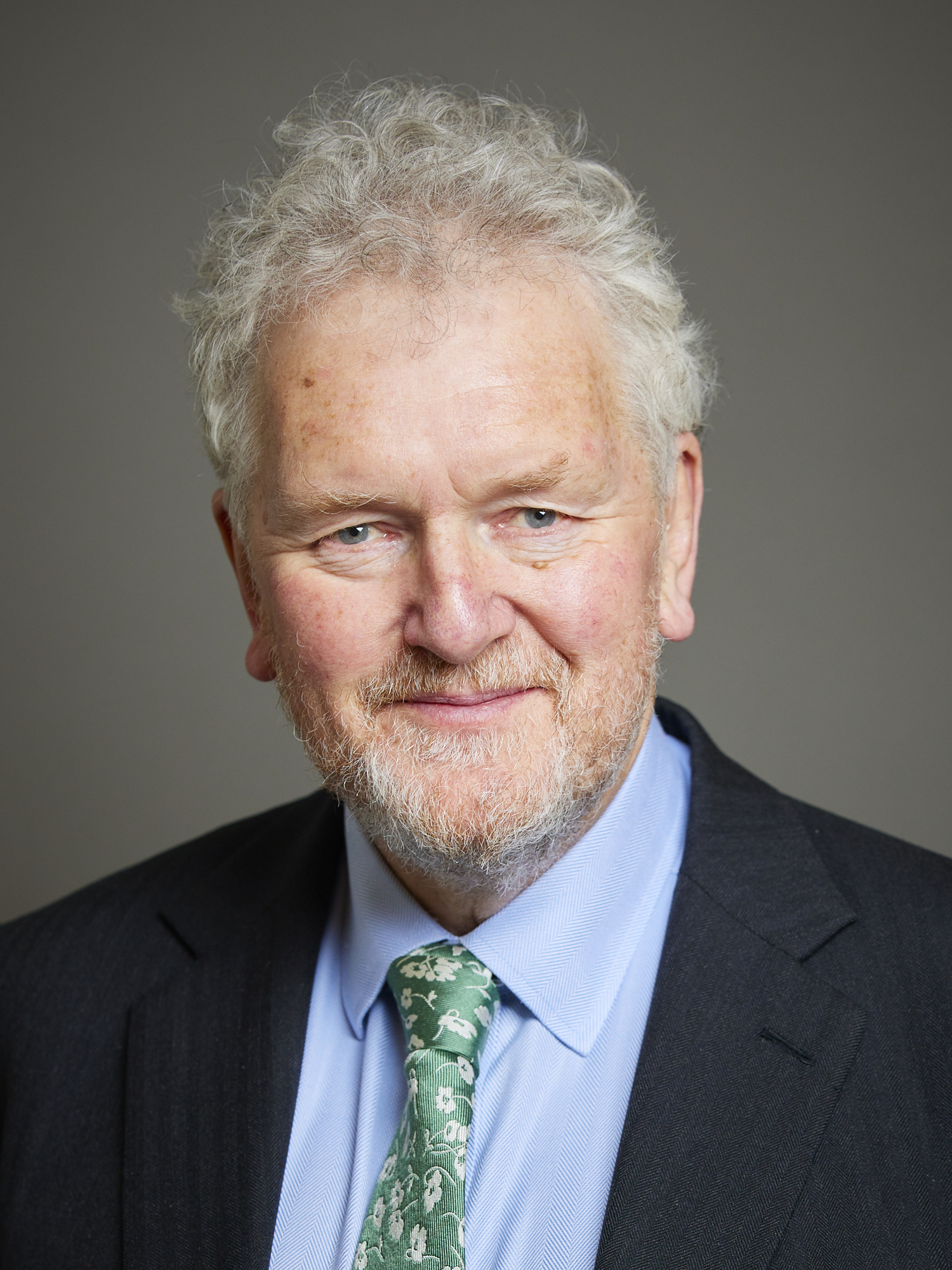
- Ralph Matthew Palmer in 2023

Member of the House of Lords
- Lord Temporal
- Hereditary peerage 21 February 1992 – 11 November 1999
- Preceded by: Anne Palmer, 11th Baroness Lucas
- Succeeded by: Seat abolished
- Elected Hereditary Peer; 11 November 1999 – 29 April 2026
- Election: 1999
- Preceded by: Seat established
- Succeeded by: Seat abolished

Personal details
- Born: Ralph Matthew Palmer; 7 June 1951 (age 75)
- Party: Conservative
- Spouses: Clarissa Marie Lockett (m. 1978; div. 1995); Amanda Atha (m. 1995; died 2000); Antonia Kennedy Rubinstein (m. 2001)
- Children: 3
- Education: Twyford School; Eton College
- Alma mater: University of Oxford (BA)
- Known for: The Good Schools Guide
- Website: lordlucas.blogspot.com

Ralph Matthew Palmer, 12th Baron Lucas, 8th Lord Dingwall (born 7 June 1951), addressed formally as Lord Lucas and Dingwall, is a former member of the House of Lords as one of the hereditary peers elected to remain in the House after the passing of the House of Lords Act 1999, representing the Conservative Party. He inherited his titles on the death of his mother in 1991, served as a Tory whip in the Lords 1994–97 for the last three years of the John Major government, and continues to serve as a backbencher. Known generally and professionally as Ralph Lucas, in 2000 he became owner and publisher of The Good Schools Guide.

== Early life and education ==
Lucas was privately educated at Twyford School and Eton College. During his gap year in 1969, he accompanied Professor Thomas Frederick Hewer and Brigadier Brian Mortimer Archibald across Afghanistan and Iran, collecting plants for the Royal Botanic Gardens, Kew and the Royal Horticultural Society (RHS) as part of a private expedition. He returned to study physics at the University of Oxford where he was an undergraduate student at Balliol College, Oxford.

== Career ==
Lucas started his career as a chartered accountant with Farrow, Bersey, Gain, Vincent & Co and successor firms, and worked at S. G. Warburg & Co. Ltd. from 1976 to 1988.

On the death of his mother in 1991, he succeeded her as 12th Baron Lucas and 8th Lord Dingwall. He was a Lord in Waiting (Government Whip in the House of Lords) during 1994–97, and the shadow Lords minister for International Development during 1997–98. He remains an active backbencher, taking a particular interest in education, liberty, electronic government, planning, finance and parking regulation.

In 1995, Ralph Lucas married Amanda Atha, the co-founder with Sarah Drummond of The Good Schools Guide, became owner, publisher and editor of the guide in 2000; he added international schools overseas to the guide in 2006.

As editor of The Good Schools Guide, Ralph Lucas has highlighted the continued improvement of state and Special Educational Needs (SEN) schools: the first edition of The Good Schools Guide in 1986 listed just ten state schools – 4 per cent of the total; by the 2016 edition, more than 300 state schools were reviewed, a quarter of the 1,200 schools reviewed that year. In the 2019 edition, nearly 400 of the 1,297 schools selected for review were state schools and 140 were SEN schools.

Lucas has commented on state schools as strong competitors for the most talented students, saying, 'Many prep schools are facing a "slow and gentle good night" as a result of rapidly improving state primaries and private tutors'. He has expressed his concerns over the dangers of charlatan tutors for very young children and rung warning bells over the ever rising fees of independent schools.

Asked by a journalist why historians make the best school leaders, he replied, 'The subject combines a fascination with humanity (pretty essential to running a school well), a disciplined way with words and stories, and a deep study of how to succeed as a dictator.'

Since inheriting his title and remaining through election by his peers, Ralph Lucas was active in the House of Lords. He served on committees that addressed digital skills, the regeneration of seaside towns, and digital technology & democracy. He chairs the Enforcement Law Reform Group. He was instrumental in adding what became known as the Lucas amendment, 'An apology, an offer of treatment or other redress, shall not of itself amount to an admission of negligence or breach of statutory duty' to the Compensation Act 2006, allowing people to apologise to victims without legal penalty.

He met his third wife, Antonia Rubenstein, when serving as a patron on the prison reform charity, Safe Ground, and was instrumental in establishing the Family Man and Fathers Inside family relationships project.

Ralph Lucas has been involved in encouraging a relationship between The Eden Project and Eastbourne. With Lady Lucas, he set up the Making Natural History project, using creative works to highlight environmental issues in and beyond Eastbourne.

Lucas was appointed a Fellow of the Institute of Chartered Accountants in England and Wales (FCA) in 1986 and is a Liveryman of the Worshipful Company of Mercers.

Lucas was a competitor on University Challenge for the 2004 "Professionals" series, when he competed on the House of Lords team.

== Personal life ==
Lucas is the son of the Anne Palmer, 11th Baroness Lucas and 7th Lady Dingwall and Major the Hon Robert Jocelyn Palmer (fifth child and third son of the 3rd Earl of Selborne).

Florence Amabel Cowper, daughter of George Cowper, 6th Earl Cowper married Auberon Herbert and inherited the Barony of Lucas of Crudwell (from her grandfather, Thomas de Grey, 2nd Earl de Grey), and the Lordship of Dingwall (from her uncle Francis Cowper, 7th Earl Cowper). They were the parents of four children, including Nan Ino Cooper, 10th Baroness Lucas (Ralph Lucas's maternal grandmother), and her elder daughter, Anne Rosemary, married Major the Hon Robert Jocelyn Palmer MC (son of Roundell Palmer, 3rd Earl of Selborne).

Lucas has been married three times:

1. Clarissa Marie Lockett on 22 July 1978. They were divorced in 1995 after having two children.
2. Lucas married Amanda Atha in 1995, who died in 2000.
3. In 2001, he married Antonia Kennedy Rubinstein, with whom he has one daughter.

Peerage of England
Preceded by Anne Palmer	Baron Lucas; 1991–present Member of the House of Lords (1992–1999)	Incumbent
Peerage of Scotland
Preceded by Anne Palmer	Lord Dingwall; 1991–present	Incumbent
Parliament of the United Kingdom
New office created by the House of Lords Act 1999	Elected hereditary peer to the House of Lords under the House of Lords Act 1999; 1999–2026	Office abolished under the House of Lords (Hereditary Peers) Act 2026
