= George Cowper, 6th Earl Cowper =

British Whig politician

The Right Honourable The Earl Cowper

Under-Secretary of State for Foreign Affairs
- In office 13 November 1834 – 17 December 1834
- Monarch: William IV
- Prime Minister: the Viscount Melbourne
- Preceded by: Sir George Shee, Bt
- Succeeded by: Viscount Mahon

Personal details
- Born: 26 June 1806
- Died: 15 April 1856 (aged 49)
- Party: Whig
- Spouse: Lady Anne Florence de Grey (d. 1880)
- Children: 6
- Parent(s): Peter Clavering-Cowper, 5th Earl Cowper; Emily Lamb

George Augustus Frederick Cowper, 6th Earl Cowper (26 June 1806 – 15 April 1856), styled Viscount Fordwich until 1837, was a British Whig politician. He served briefly as Under-Secretary of State for Foreign Affairs under his uncle Lord Melbourne in 1834.

== Background ==
Cowper was the eldest son of Peter Clavering-Cowper, 5th Earl Cowper, and his wife Emily Lamb, daughter of Peniston Lamb, 1st Viscount Melbourne, sister of Prime Minister William Lamb, 2nd Viscount Melbourne, and a leading figure in Regency society. William Cowper-Temple, 1st Baron Mount Temple, was his younger brother. Following the death of her husband, his mother married the future Prime Minister Henry Temple, 3rd Viscount Palmerston, in 1839.

== Military career ==
He was commissioned a cornet in the Royal Horse Guards on 28 April 1827. On 27 February 1830, he purchased a lieutenancy in the regiment. He retired on the half-pay of the New South Wales Veteran Companies in March 1831, but exchanged into a lieutenancy in the 31st Regiment of Foot on 13 February 1835. He retired from the Regular army on 6 March 1835. However, in 1833 he had accepted command of a Troop in the part-time South Hertfordshire Yeomanry Cavalry with the rank of captain, which he held until his resignation in April 1832.

== Political career ==
Cowper entered the House of Commons for Canterbury in the 1830 general election, and served briefly under his uncle Lord Melbourne as Under-Secretary of State for Foreign Affairs between November and December 1834. He lost his seat in Parliament in the 1835 general election. Two years later he succeeded his father in the earldom. Between 1846 and 1856 he served as Lord-Lieutenant of Kent.

== Marriage and issue ==
Lord Cowper married Lady Anne Florence de Grey (who after her husband's death succeeded as sixth Baroness Lucas of Crudwell), daughter of Thomas de Grey, 2nd Earl de Grey, in 1833. They had two sons and four daughters:

- Francis Thomas de Grey Cowper, 7th Earl Cowper (1834–1905)
- The Honourable Henry Frederick Cowper (1836–1887)
- Lady Henrietta Emily Mary Cowper (26 March 1838 – 28 June 1853), died young
- Lady Florence Amabel Cowper (4 December 1840 – 28 April 1886), married the Honourable Auberon Herbert in 1871.
- Lady Adine Eliza Anne Cowper (17 March 1843 – 20 October 1868), married Hon. Julian Fane in 1866.
- Lady Amabel Frederica Henrietta Cowper (1846–1906), married Lord Walter Kerr in 1873.

Lord Cowper died in April 1856, aged 49, and was succeeded in the earldom by his eldest son Francis. Lady Cowper died in 1880.

== Arms ==
Coat of arms of George Cowper, 6th Earl Cowper
Crest A lion's jamb erased Or holding a cherry branch Vert fructed Gules. Escutcheon Argent three martlets Gules on a chief engrailed of the last three annulets Or. Supporters Two dun horses close cropped (except a tuft on the withers) and docked a large blaze down the face a black list down the back and three white feet viz both hind and the near fore foot. Motto Tuum Est (It Is Thine)

Parliament of the United Kingdom
Preceded by Stephen Rumbold Lushington; Lord Clifton	Member of Parliament for Canterbury; 1830–1835; With: Richard Watson	Succeeded by Lord Albert Conyngham; Frederick Villiers
Political offices
Preceded by Sir George Shee, Bt	Under-Secretary of State for Foreign Affairs; November–December 1834	Succeeded by Viscount Mahon
Honorary titles
Preceded by The Earl of Thanet	Lord-Lieutenant of Kent; 1846–1856	Succeeded by The Viscount Sydney
Peerage of Great Britain
Preceded by Peter Clavering-Cowper	Earl Cowper; 1837–1856	Succeeded by Francis Thomas de Grey Cowper
