= Nan Ino Cooper, 10th Baroness Lucas =

British nurse and educator

Nan Ino Cooper, 10th Baroness Lucas and 6th Lady Dingwall (13 June 1880 – 1958) was a British nurse and educator.

== Early life and education ==
Born in Blandford, Dorset, Nan Ino Herbert Cooper was the daughter of Auberon Edward William Molyneux Herbert and Florence Amabell (Cowper) Herbert. Cooper was interested in mystical and occult religions (an 'ardent theosophist').

== Work ==
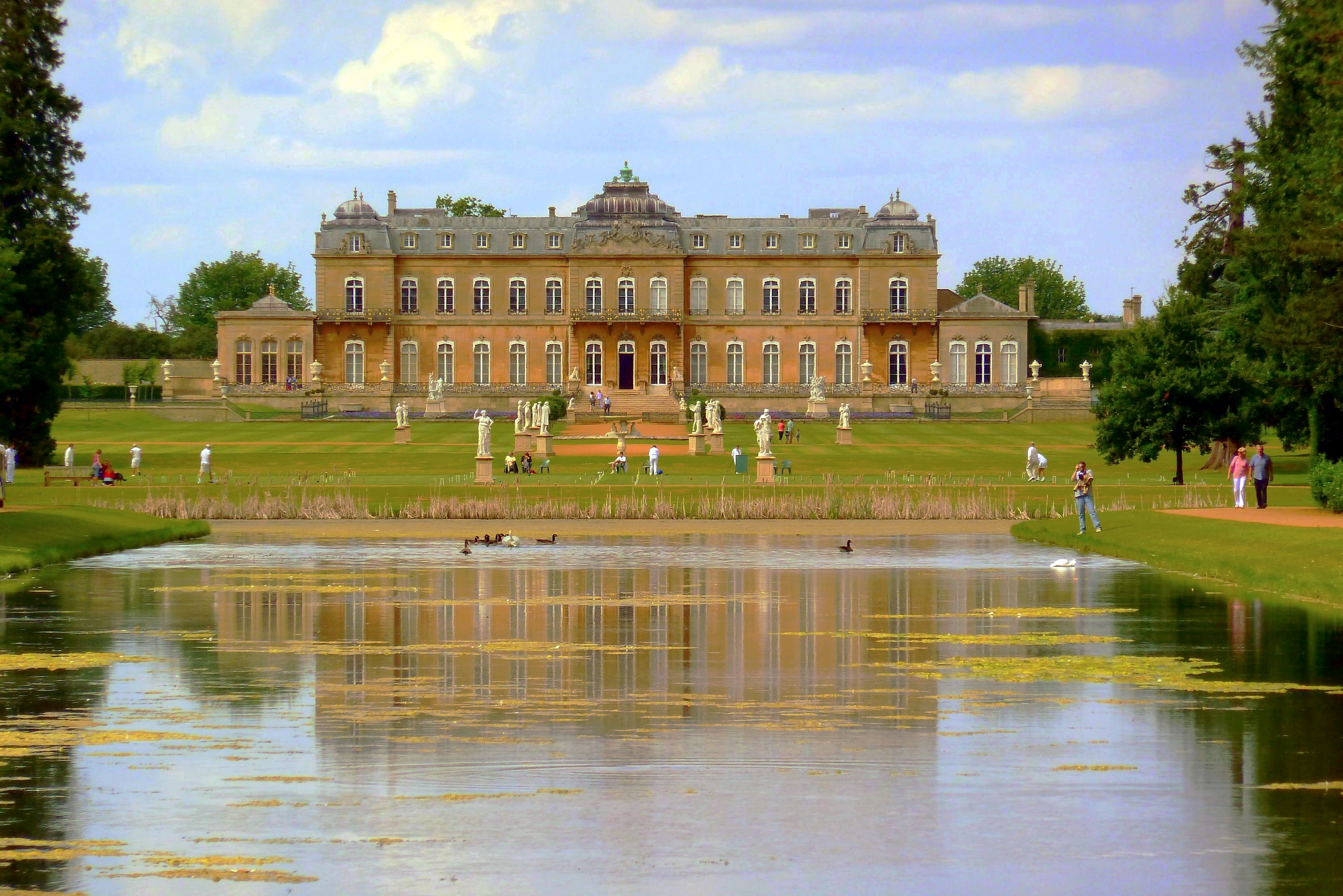
Wrest House in the Wrest Park estate

She gave away a house in the New Forest that she had inherited to the 'Purple Lotus Mother' of the 'Universal Brotherhood' for a theosophist school. She was a director of the Cuba Raja Yoga School in the early 1900s in Cuba where she lived.

Lady Lucas ran the family home, Wrest Park during her brother Auberon Herbert, 9th Baron Lucas's lifetime.

Before World War I broke out in 1914, Lady Lucas had trained as a nurse and then went on to take over setting up and running her family home, Wrest Park, as a hospital for wounded soldiers.

== Donations of family collections ==
Lady Lucas inherited a collection of over 3,000 prints and drawings collected by Amabel Hume-Campbell, 1st Countess de Grey and her nephew Thomas de Grey, 2nd Earl de Grey. She donated this collection to the British Museum in memory of her brother, who had died of wounds suffered as a fighter pilot during World War I. She kept another collection including items on the history of printmaking, mezzotints and stipples, which (along with the contents of Wrest Park) was later sold at auction.

In the early 1920s, Lady Lucas also donated a significant collection of fossils, largely from the Isle of Wight, to the Natural History Museum.

== Personal life ==
She succeeded to the titles of her brother, Auberon Thomas Herbert, becoming 10th Baroness Lucas and 6th Lady Dingwall, in 1916, and, on 30 April 1917, she married Lt-Col Howard Lister Cooper. They had two children, Anne Rosemary Cooper and Rachel Cooper, who married Spencer Loch. Lady Lucas died on 3 November 1958. Her elder daughter inherited her titles. Her younger daughter had three children.

Peerage of England
| Preceded by Auberon Herbert | Baron Lucas; 1916–1958 | Succeeded by Anne Rosemary Palmer |
Peerage of Scotland
| Preceded by Auberon Herbert | Lady Dingwall; 1916–1958 | Succeeded by Anne Rosemary Palmer |
