= Richard Butler, Earl of Arran =

Irish earl and English baron (1639–1686)

The Right Honorable The Earl of Arran
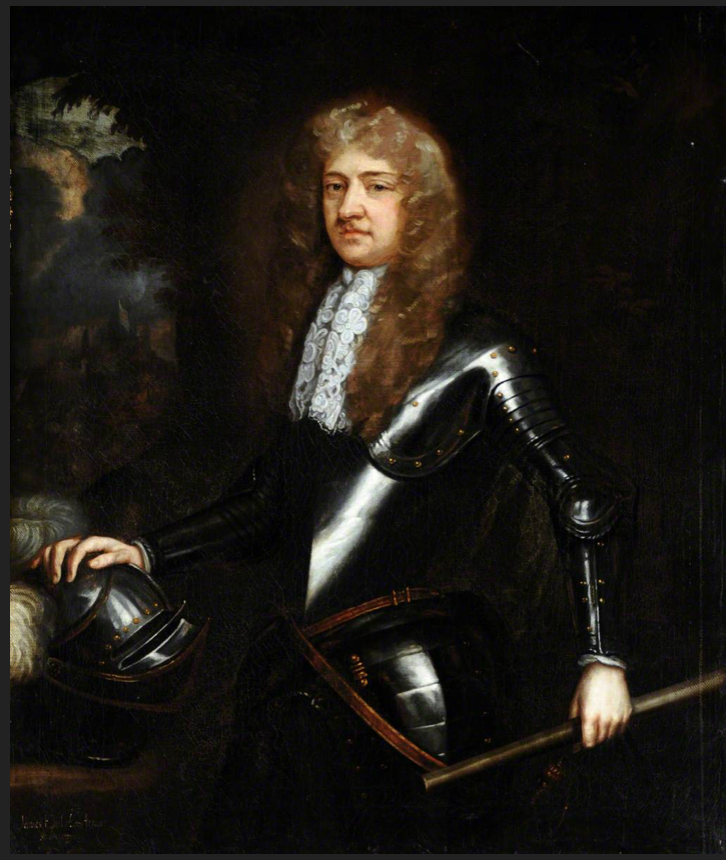
- Detail from the portrait below
- Tenure: 1662–1686
- Born: 15 July 1639
- Died: 25 January 1686 (aged 46); London
- Spouses: 1. Mary Stuart; 2. Dorothy Ferrers
- Issue Detail: Charlotte & others
- Father: James, 1st Duke of Ormond
- Mother: Elizabeth Preston

Richard Butler, Earl of Arran (1639–1686) was Lord Deputy of Ireland from 1682 to 1684 while James Butler, 1st Duke of Ormonde, his father, the Lord Lieutenant, was absent in England. He sat in the Irish House of Lords as Earl of Arran and in the English one as Baron Butler of Weston. When William Howard, 1st Viscount Stafford was accused of treason during the Popish Plot, Arran braved the anti-Catholic hysteria and voted not guilty.

== Birth and origins ==
Family tree

Richard Butler with his two wives, his parents, and other selected relatives. (Note: This family tree is partly derived from the condensed Butler family tree pictured in Dunboyne. Also see the lists of siblings and children in the text.)

Elizabeth; Butler c. 1585 – 1628	Richard; Preston; 1st Earl; Desmond d. 1628)	Thomas; Viscount; Thurles bef. 1596 – 1619	Elizabeth; Pointz; 1587–1673
Elizabeth; Preston; 1615–1684	James; 1st Duke; 1610–1688	Richard of Kilcash; 1615–1701
Thomas; 6th Earl; Ossory; 1633–1680	Mary; Stuart d. 1668	Richard; 1st Earl; Arran; 1639–1684	Dorothy; Ferrers d. 1716	Walter of Garryricken d. 1700
James; 2nd Duke; Ormond; 1665–1745	Charles; Earl; Arran; 1671–1758	Charles; 4th Baron; 1675–1722	Charlotte; Butler; 1679–1725	Thomas of Garryricken d. 1738
Charles; 1st Earl; 1700–1762	Elizabeth; Townshend d. 1785	John de jure 15th Earl d. 1766

Legend

XXX	Subject of the article	XXX	Earls & dukes of Ormond	XXX	Barons and Earls of Cornwallis

Richard was born on 15 July 1639, probably in Ireland. He was the fifth son of James Butler and his wife Elizabeth Preston. His father was then the 12th Earl of Ormond but would be elevated to marquess and duke. His father's family, the Butler dynasty, was Old English and descended from Theobald Walter, who had been appointed Chief Butler of Ireland by King Henry II in 1177.

Richard's mother was a second cousin once removed of his father as she was the granddaughter of Black Tom, the 10th Earl of Ormond. Her father, however, was Scottish, Richard Preston, 1st Earl of Desmond, a favourite of James I. Both his parents were Protestants. They had married on Christmas Day 1629.

Richard was one of ten siblings, but five of his brothers died in early childhood. He, his three surviving brothers and two sisters, are listed in his father's article.

== Early life ==
In June 1647 Richard, together with James Dillon, 3rd Earl of Roscommon, was given as hostage to the English Parliament by his father. On 13 May 1662 he was created Baron Butler of Cloughgrennan, Viscount Tullogh and Earl of Arran (having purchased the Aran Islands) in the Peerage of Ireland, with a special remainder to his younger brother John, should his own male line fail. This precaution would prove inefficient as his younger brother died before him.

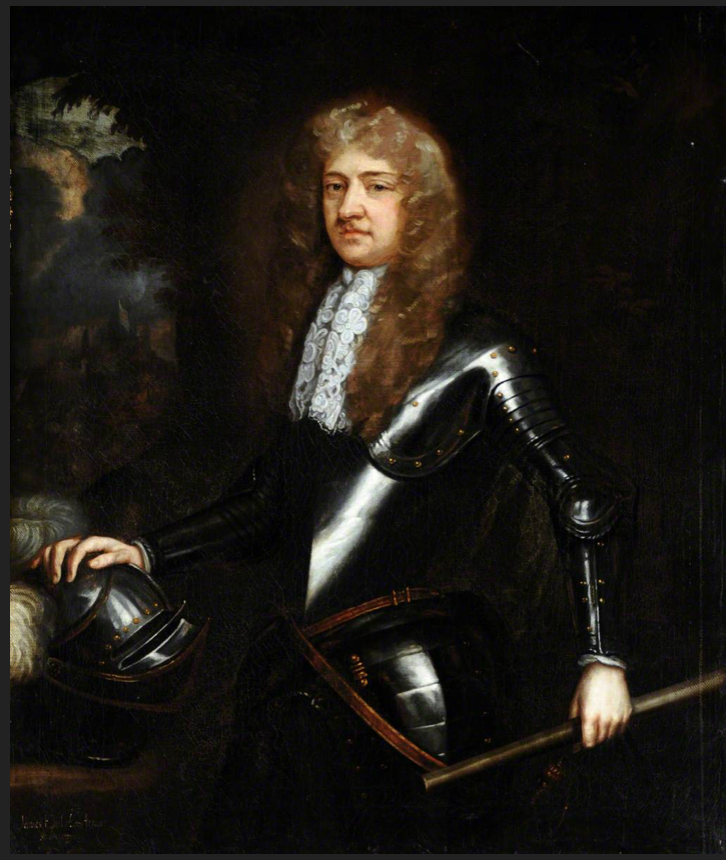
Richard Butler, Earl of Arran, attributed to Godfrey Kneller

== Marriages and children ==
Arran, as he was now, married twice. Both brides were rich heiresses. In September 1664 he married Mary Stuart, Baroness Clifton in her own right, daughter of James Stuart, 1st Duke of Richmond and 4th Duke of Lennox. She died in 1668 childless at the age of 16 and was buried in St Canice's Cathedral, Kilkenny.

He married secondly Dorothy, daughter of John Ferrers of Tamworth Castle and his wife Anne, daughter of Sir Dudley Carleton.

Richard and Dorothy had four children:

1. James (1674–1676), died in infancy
2. Thomas (1675–1681), died in infancy
3. Charlotte (1679–1725), his only surviving child and heiress, who married Charles, 4th Baron Cornwallis
4. Thomas (1681–1685), died in infancy

== Later life ==
On 27 August 1673, as a reward for his bravery in the sea fights against the Dutch in the Third Anglo-Dutch War, Arran was also created Baron Butler of Weston in the Peerage of England.

In 1680, when the Catholic William Howard, 1st Viscount Stafford was tried for high treason in the bogus Popish Plot, Arran was one of 31 peers who voted not guilty. As the most junior English peer, Arran was the first to cast his vote; his vote of "not guilty" took some courage, given the prevailing hysteria whipped up against anyone who cast doubt on the veracity of the supposed plot. However, 55 peers voted guilty and Stafford was executed.

Arran was made Lord Deputy of Ireland in April 1682 when his father, the Lord Lieutenant of Ireland, travelled to England, and held the post until August 1684 when his father returned. This honour came to him because his elder brother Ossory, who had been deputy from 1668 to 1669 had died in 1680.

== Death and timeline ==
Arran died of pleurisy in London on 25 January 1686 and was buried in Westminster Abbey. As he died without surviving male issue, and his brother John had died before him, his titles became extinct. His only daughter, Charlotte, inherited the estate, which she brought her husband when she married Lord Cornwallis in 1699.

However, his three Irish titles would be recreated in 1693 for his nephew Charles Butler, who would be created Baron Butler of Cloughgrenan, Viscount Tullough, and Earl of Arran of the 1693 creation.

Timeline
Age	Date	Event
0	1639, 15 Jul	Born, probably at Kilkenny Castle
3	1642, 30 Aug	Father created Marquess of Ormond
7	1647, 19 Jun	Given as hostage to the English Parliament by his father
9	1649, 30 Jan	King Charles I beheaded.
20	1660, 29 May	Restoration of King Charles II
22	1662, 13 May	Created Baron Butler of Cloughgrennan, Viscount Tullogh and Earl of Arran.
25	1664, Sep	Married 1st Mary Stuart, Baroness Clifton
28	1668, 4 Jul	First wife died childless.
33–34	1673, before 7 Jun	Married 2ndly Elizabeth Ferrers
34	1673, 27 Aug	Created Baron Butler of Weston in the Peerage of England
37–38	1677	Brother John, Earl of Gowran, died.
41	1680, 21 Jul	Eldest brother Thomas, Earl of Ossory, died.
42	1682, Apr	Appointed Lord Deputy of Ireland to rule Ireland during his father's absence.
45	1685, 6 Feb	Accession of King James II, succeeding King Charles II
46	1686, 25 Jan	Died in London.

== Notes and references ==
=== Sources ===
- Airy, Osmund (1886). "Butler, James, twelfth Earl and first Duke of Ormonde (1610–1688)". In Lee, Sidney (ed.). Dictionary of National Biography. Vol. VIII. New York: MacMillan and Co. pp. 52–60. OCLC 8544105.
- Bagwell, Richard (1916). Ireland under the Stuarts and under the Interregnum. Vol. III. London: Longmans, Green, and Co. OCLC 458582656. – 1660 to 1690
- Burke, Bernard; Burke, Ashworth Peter (1915). A Genealogical and Heraldic History of the Peerage and Baronetage, the Privy Council, Knightage and Companionage (77th ed.). London: Harrison. OCLC 1155471554.
- Chester, Joseph Lemuel (1876). Registers of Westminster Abbey. London: Private Edition. OCLC 1140248. – Marriages, baptisms and burials from about 1660 to 1875
- Cokayne, George Edward (1895). Complete Peerage of England, Scotland, Ireland, Great Britain and the United Kingdom, Extant, Extinct, or Dormant. Vol. VI (1st ed.). London: George Bell and Sons. OCLC 1180818801. – N to R (for Ossory under Ormond)
- Cokayne, George Edward (1910). Gibbs, Vicary (ed.). The complete peerage of England, Scotland, Ireland, Great Britain and the United Kingdom, extant, extinct, or dormant. Vol. I (2nd ed.). London: St Catherine Press. OCLC 228661424. – Ab-Adam to Basing (for Arran)
- Davies, J. D. (2004). "Butler, Thomas, sixth earl of Ossory (1634–1680)". In Matthew, Henry Colin Gray.; Harrison, Brian (eds.). Oxford Dictionary of National Biography. Vol. 9. New York: Oxford University Press. pp. 226–229. ISBN 0-19-861359-8.
- Debrett, John (1828a). Peerage of the United Kingdom of Great Britain and Ireland. Vol. I (17th ed.). London: F. C. and J. Rivington. OCLC 54499602. – England
- Debrett, John (1828b). Peerage of the United Kingdom of Great Britain and Ireland. Vol. II (17th ed.). London: F. C. and J. Rivington. OCLC 54499602. – Scotland and Ireland
- Dunboyne, Patrick Theobald Tower Butler, Baron (1968). Butler Family History (2nd ed.). Kilkenny: Rothe House.
- Fryde, Edmund Boleslaw; Greenway, D. E.; Porter, S.; Roy, I., eds. (1986). Handbook of British Chronology. Royal Historical Society Guides and Handbooks, No. 2 (3rd ed.). London: Offices of the Royal Historical Society. ISBN 0-86193-106-8. – (for timeline)
- Lodge, John (1789). Archdall, Mervyn (ed.). The Peerage of Ireland or, A Genealogical History of the Present Nobility of that Kingdom. Vol. IV. Dublin: James Moore. OCLC 264906028. – Viscounts (for Butler, Viscount Mountgarrett)
- Meehan, Rev. Charles Patrick (1882). The Confederation of Kilkenny (New revised and enlarged ed.). Dublin: James Duffy. OCLC 224157081.
- Murtagh, Harman (2004). "Butler, Richard, first earl of Arran (1639–1686)". In Matthew, Henry Colin Gray.; Harrison, Brian (eds.). Oxford Dictionary of National Biography. Vol. 9. New York: Oxford University Press. pp. 197–198. ISBN 0-19-861359-8.
- Perceval-Maxwell, Michael (2004). "Butler [née Preston] Elizabeth, duchess of Ormond and suo jure Lady Dingwall (1615–1684)". In Matthew, Henry Colin Gray.; Harrison, Brian (eds.). Oxford Dictionary of National Biography. Vol. 9. New York: Oxford University Press. pp. 130–131. ISBN 0-19-861359-8.

Peerage of Ireland
New creation	Earl of Arran (Ireland); 1662–1686	Extinct
