= John Butler, 17th Earl of Ormonde =

Irish earl (1740–1795)

John Butler
- Earl of Ormond
- Tenure: 1783–1795
- Predecessor: Walter, 16th Earl of Ormonde
- Successor: Walter, 1st Marquess of Ormonde
- Born: 10 December 1740; Garryricken, Ireland
- Died: 25 or 30 December 1795 (aged 55); Kilkenny Castle, Ireland
- Spouse: Anne Wandesford
- Issue Detail: Walter, James, & others
- Father: Walter, 16th Earl of Ormonde
- Mother: Ellen Morres

John Butler, 17th Earl of Ormonde, 11th Earl of Ossory (1740–1795) was an Irish peer and Member of Parliament (MP). He became a Protestant in 1764. He was an Irish MP, representing Gowran between 1776 and 1783, and Kilkenny City between 1783 and 1792. In 1791, his right to the peerage was acknowledged in the Irish House of Lords and he became the 17th Earl of Ormond; he was a great-great grandson of Richard Butler of Kilcash, the younger brother of James Butler, 1st Duke and 12th Earl of Ormonde.

== Birth and origins ==
John was born on 10 December 1740 at Garryricken. He was the only son, of Walter Butler and his wife Ellen Morres. At the time of his birth his father was the heir apparent of his father the esquire of Garryricken. In 1766 his father would become the de jure 16th Earl of Ormond. His father's family, the Butler dynasty, was Old English and descended from Theobald Walter, who had been appointed Chief Butler of Ireland by King Henry II in 1177.

John's mother was a daughter of Nicholas Morres of the Court, County Dublin, granddaughter of Sir John Morres, 7th Baronet Morres of Knockagh. John was one of four siblings, who are listed in his father's article.

== Conversion to Protestantism ==
On 16 December 1764 he conformed to the established Church of Ireland in a ceremony performed in the church of Golden, County Tipperary. In other words: he became a Protestant.

== Marriage and children ==
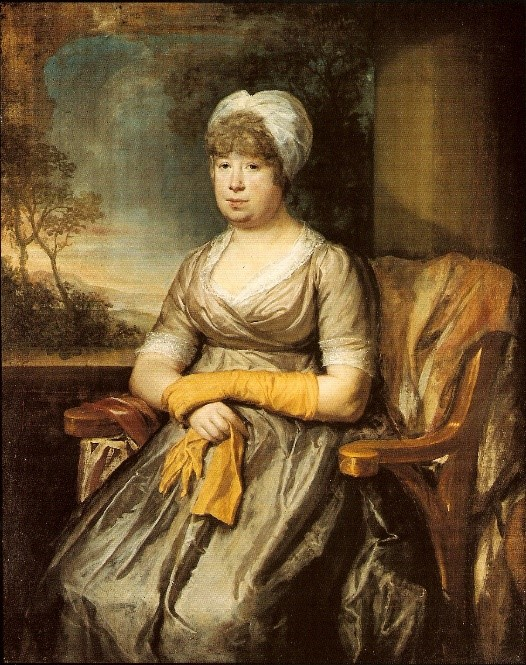
His wife, Anne Wandesford, painted by Hugh Douglas Hamilton

In February 1769 Butler married Lady Anne Wandesford.

Anne was the daughter of John Wandesford, 1st Earl Wandesford and his wife Agnes Southwell, who was the only daughter and heiress of John Southwell of Enniscourt, Limerick. Following the death of Anne's brother John Wandesford, Viscount Castlecomer, Anne became the sole heiress to the Wandesford estates, which comprised some 20,000 acres centred on Castlecomer in County Kilkenny.

The marriage produced ten children, six of whom survived infancy:

- Walter Butler, 18th Earl of Ormonde (1770–1820), who was created Marquess of Ormonde in 1816.
- John Butler (b. 1771, d. 1771)
- The Hon. John Wandesford Butler (1772–1796), who died unmarried.
- Thomas Butler (b. 1773 d. 1773)
- The Hon. James Butler (1774–1838), (succeeded as 19th Earl of Ormonde in 1820, and later created Marquess of Ormonde in 1825)
- Lady Elizabeth Butler (1777 - 1823), who married Thomas Kavanagh Esq. of Burros House, Kilkenny in 1798.
- Richard Butler
- The Hon. Charles Harward Butler (1780–1860), who married (1) Lady Sarah Butler, daughter of Henry Thomas Butler, 2nd Earl of Carrick (2) Lucy Butler, Dowager Countess of Carrick (his first wife's sister-in-law, and daughter of Arthur French). Charles Butler adopted several additional surnames by Royal Licence throughout his lifetime, eventually becoming The Hon. Charles Harward Butler-Clarke-Southwell-Wandesford in 1830.
- Piers Butler
- Lady Eleanor Butler (1788 - 1859), who married Cornelius O'Callaghan, 1st Viscount Lismore in 1808.

== Two inheritances ==
In 1783 his father died in Kilkenny Castle. John inherited Kilkenny and the lands, notably those that his father had inherited from John Butler of Kilcash, the de jure 15th Earl of Ormond, in 1766. In 1784 his father-in-law, the Earl of Wandesford died. His titles became extinct, but John inherited the land and the coal mines.

== Family tree and claim to the Earldoms of Ormond and Ossory ==
In 1791 he claimed the title of Earl of Ormond, which was believed to have become extinct in 1715. The Irish House of Lords accepted this claim and he was restored to become the 17th Earl of Ormonde.

Family tree

John Butler with wife, parents, and other selected relatives. (Note: This family tree is partly derived from the condensed Butler family tree pictured in Dunboyne. Also see the lists of siblings and children in the text.)

Walter of Garryricken d. 1700	Mary; Plunket
Thomas of Garryricken d. 1738; Colonel	Margaret; Magennis; 1673–1744	John; Butler	Frances; Butler
John de jure 15th Earl d. 1766	Walter de jure 16th Earl; 1703–1783	Ellen; Morres d. 1794
John; 17th Earl; 1740–1795	Anne; Wandesford; 1754–1830
Walter; 1st Marquess; 1770–1820	Anna; Clarke d. 1817	James; 1st Marquess; 1774–1838	Louisa; Staples
John; 2nd Marquess; 1808–1854	Frances; Jane; Paget

Legend

XXX	Subject of the article	XXX	Earls & marquesses of Ormond

== Death and succession ==
Ormond, as he now was, died on 25 or 30 December 1795 at Kilkenny Castle and was buried in Kilcash. His widow died in Dublin in 1830. He was succeeded by his son Walter, who was made a Marquess in 1816.

Timeline
Age	Date	Event
0	1740, 10 Dec	Born at Garryricken
119	1760, 25 Oct	Accession of King George III, succeeding King George II
24	1764, 16 Dec	Became a Protestant
25	1766, 24 Jun	Father inherited the estate of John Butler of Kilcash and unknowingly became de jure the 16th Earl of Ormond.
28	1769, 26 Feb	Married Frances Susan Elizabeth Wandesford
42–43	1783	Father died at Kilkenny Castle.
43–44	1784	Father-in-law died, and he inherits in the name of his wife.
50–51	1791	Became Earl of Ormond
54–55	1795, Dec	Died

== Notes and references ==
=== Sources ===
- Burke, Bernard (1883). A Genealogical History of the Dormant, Abeyant, Forfeited and Extinct Peerages of the British Empire (New ed.). London: Harrison. OCLC 499232768.
- Burke, Bernard; Burke, Ashworth Peter (1915). A Genealogical and Heraldic History of the Peerage and Baronetage, the Privy Council, Knightage and Companionage (77th ed.). London: Harrison. OCLC 1155471554.
- Carrigan, Rev William (1905). The History and Antiquities of the Diocese of Ossory. Vol. IV. Dublin: Sealy, Bryers & Walker. OCLC 29384778. – The Southern Deanery
- Cokayne, George Edward (1895). Complete Peerage of England, Scotland, Ireland, Great Britain and the United Kingdom, Extant, Extinct, or Dormant. Vol. VI (1st ed.). London: George Bell and Sons. OCLC 1180818801. – N to R (for Ormonde)
- Debrett, John (1828). Peerage of the United Kingdom of Great Britain and Ireland. Vol. II (17th ed.). London: F. C. and J. Rivington. OCLC 54499602. – Scotland and Ireland
- Debrett, John (1838). Courthope, William (ed.). Debrett's Complete Peerage of the United Kingdom of Great Britain and Ireland (22nd ed.). London: F. C. and J. Rivington. OCLC 315551200.
- Dunboyne, Patrick Theobald Tower Butler, Baron (1968). Butler Family History (2nd ed.). Kilkenny: Rothe House.
- Fryde, Edmund Boleslaw; Greenway, D. E.; Porter, S.; Roy, I., eds. (1986). Handbook of British Chronology. Royal Historical Society Guides and Handbooks, No. 2 (3rd ed.). London: Offices of the Royal Historical Society. ISBN 0-86193-106-8. – (for timeline)
- Lodge, John (1789). Archdall, Mervyn (ed.). The Peerage of Ireland or, A Genealogical History of the Present Nobility of that Kingdom. Vol. IV. Dublin: James Moore. OCLC 264906028. – Viscounts (for Butler, Viscount Mountgarret)

Parliament of Ireland
Preceded by Arthur Browne; Henry Prittie	Member of Parliament for Gowran; 1776–1783; With: James Agar 1776–77; Sir Boyle Roche, 1st Bt 1777–83	Succeeded by Hon. Henry Welbore Agar; George Dunbar
Preceded by Gervase Parker Bushe; Eland Mossom	Member of Parliament for Kilkenny City; 1783–1792; With: William Cuffe	Succeeded by William Cuffe; Hon. John Wandesford Butler
Peerage of Ireland
Preceded by Walter Butler (de jure)	Earl of Ormonde; Earl of Ossory; 1783–1795	Succeeded by Walter Butler
