= John Butler, 15th Earl of Ormonde =

Irish de jure earl (died 1766)

John Butler
- Earl of Ormonde
- Tenure: 1758–1766 de jure
- Predecessor: Charles Butler, 1st Earl of Arran,
- Successor: Walter Butler, 16th Earl of Ormonde,
- Born: c. 1720 probably Kilcash Castle
- Died: 25 July 1766
- Spouse: Bridget Stacey
- Issue Detail: The marriage was childless
- Father: Thomas Butler of Garryricken
- Mother: Margaret Magennis

John Butler (died 1766), known as John Butler of Kilcash, a member of the Irish landed gentry, was de jure 15th Earl of Ormond and 8th Earl of Ossory. He did not assume these titles as he thought them forfeit by the attainder of the 2nd Duke of Ormond. He did, however, inherit the Ormond estate from the 1st Earl of Arran through Arran's sister Amelia. In 1791, the title of Earl of Ormond would be successfully claimed by his cousin, the 17th Earl.

== Birth and origins ==
Family tree

John Butler with wife, parents, and other selected relatives. (Note: This family tree is derived from two published trees, and classical genealogical sources. Also see the list of siblings in the text.)

Thomas; Viscount; Thurles d. 1619 d.v.p.*	Elizabeth; Pointz; 1587–1673
James; 1st Duke; Ormond; 1610–1688	Elizabeth; Preston; 1630–1684	Richard of Kilcash; 1615–1701	Frances; Tuchet
Thomas; 6th Earl; Ossory; 1633–1680 d.v.p.*	Emilia von Nassau; 1635–1688	Walter of Garryricken d. 1700 d.v.p.*	Mary; Plunkett
James; 2nd Duke; Ormond; 1665–1745	Charles; 1st Earl; Arran; 1671–1758	Amelia; Butler d. 1760	Thomas of Garryricken d. 1738; Colonel	Margaret; Magennis; 1673–1744	John; Butler
Thomas; Butler; 1686–1689	John de jure 15th Earl; Ormond d. 1766	Bridget; Stacey	Walter de jure 16th Earl; Ormond; 1703–1783
John; 17th Earl; Ormond; 1740–1795	Anne; Wandesford; 1754–1830

Legend

XXX	Subject of the article	XXX	Earls and dukes of Ormond

*d.v.p. = predeceased his father (decessit vita patris).

John was born about 1720, (Note: His birth date is constrained by the marriage of his parents (1696) plus the gestations of his two elder brothers on one hand, and his father's death (1738) plus his gestation on the other hand.) probably at Kilcash Castle, his parents' habitual residence. He was the third but only surviving son of Thomas Butler of Garryricken and his wife Margaret Magennis. His father belonged to a cadet branch of the Butler Dynasty, being the grandson and heir of Richard Butler of Kilcash, who was the younger brother of James Butler, 1st Duke of Ormond. The Butlers were Old English and descended from Theobald Walter, who had been appointed Chief Butler of Ireland by King Henry II in 1177.

John's mother was the eldest daughter of William Burke, 7th Earl of Clanricarde and widow of Bryan Magennis, 5th Viscount of Iveagh. His parents were both Catholic. They had married in 1696. John had two brothers and five sisters, which are listed in his father's article.

== Inheritances and successions ==
In 1738 his father died. John inherited Kilcash and other parts of the lands of Garryricken Manor, which had been created for his grandfather Richard Butler of Kilcash shortly after 1639 and had been divided between his father and his uncle John, who held Garryricken House itself. He did not inherit any title as his father held none.

In 1758, on the death of the 1st Earl of Arran, his father's second cousin, he unknowingly became de jure the 15th Earl of Ormond. (Note: Burke numbers him as the 15th Earl, but Cokayne numbers him as the 16th.) It had been believed that all the titles of James Butler, 2nd Duke of Ormond became forfeit in 1715. However, in 1791, it would be found that the title of "Earl of Ormond" (and its subsidiary titles) in the peerage of Ireland had merely lain dormant and so could be successfully revived by John Butler's cousin, John Butler, 17th Earl of Ormonde.

Following the second Duke's attainder, the Ormond estate was administrated by the Forfeited Estates Commissioners. With the permission of the Parliament of Great Britain in passing the Crown Lands (Forfeited Estates) Act 1720 (7 Geo. 1. St. 1. c. 22), the estate was purchased in 1721 by the second Duke's brother, Charles, the Earl of Arran. Arran died childless in 1758. The estate passed to his unmarried sister Lady Amelia Butler, who held it for about two years. On her death in 1760, the estate was inherited by John Butler, the subject of this article.

== Marriage ==
John Butler married Bridget Stacey on 19 April 1763, but the marriage was childless.

== Death and succession ==
He died on 24 June 1766 (Note: The year 1766 is correct as the year of his death, whereas 1786 seems to be an error.) and was buried at Kilcash. He was succeeded by his cousin Walter, the son of his uncle John, who unknowingly became de jure the 16th Earl of Ormond.

Timeline
As his birth date is uncertain, so are all his ages.
Age	Date	Event
0	1720, about	Born at Kilcash Castle.
6–7	1727, 11 Jun	Accession of King George II, succeeding King George I
17–18	1738	Father died.
23–24	1744	Mother died.
37–38	1758, 17 Dec	Unknowingly became the 15th Earl of Ormond (de jure) at Arran's death.
39–40	1760	Inherited the Ormond estates from Amelia, Arran's unmarried sister.
39–40	1760, 25 Oct	Accession of King George III, succeeding King George II
42–43	1763, 19 Apr	Married Bridget Stacey.
45–46	1766, 24 Jun	Died childless.

== Notes and references ==
=== Sources ===
- Burke, Bernard; Burke, Ashworth Peter (1915). A Genealogical and Heraldic History of the Peerage and Baronetage, the Privy Council, Knightage and Companionage (77th ed.). London: Harrison. OCLC 1155471554.
- Carrigan, Rev William (1905). The History and Antiquities of the Diocese of Ossory. Vol. IV. Dublin: Sealy Bryers & Walker. OCLC 29384778.
- Cokayne, George Edward (1893). Complete peerage of England, Scotland, Ireland, Great Britain and the United Kingdom, extant, extinct, or dormant. Vol. V (1st ed.). London: George Bell and Sons. OCLC 1180836840. – L to M (for Magennis)
- Cokayne, George Edward (1895). Complete Peerage of England, Scotland, Ireland, Great Britain and the United Kingdom, Extant, Extinct, or Dormant. Vol. VI (1st ed.). London: George Bell and Sons. OCLC 1180818801. – N to R (for Ormond)
- Cokayne, George Edward (1926). Gibbs, Vicary (ed.). The complete peerage of England, Scotland, Ireland, Great Britain and the United Kingdom, extant, extinct, or dormant. Vol. V (2nd ed.). London: St Catherine Press. OCLC 228661424. – Eardley of Spalding to Goojerat (for Fingall)
- Debrett, John (1828). Peerage of the United Kingdom of Great Britain and Ireland. Vol. II (17th ed.). London: F. C. and J. Rivington. OCLC 54499602. – Scotland and Ireland
- Dunboyne, Patrick Theobald Tower Butler, Baron (1968). Butler Family History (2nd ed.). Kilkenny: Rothe House.
- Fryde, Edmund Boleslaw; Greenway, D. E.; Porter, S.; Roy, I., eds. (1986). Handbook of British Chronology. Royal Historical Society Guides and Handbooks, No. 2 (3rd ed.). London: Offices of the Royal Historical Society. ISBN 0-86193-106-8. – (for timeline)
- Handley, Stuart (2004). "Butler, James, second duke of Ormond (1665–1745)". In Matthew, Henry Colin Gray.; Harrison, Brian (eds.). Oxford Dictionary of National Biography. Vol. 9. New York: Oxford University Press. pp. 163–168. ISBN 0-19-861359-8.
- Lodge, John (1789). Archdall, Mervyn (ed.). The Peerage of Ireland or, A Genealogical History of the Present Nobility of that Kingdom. Vol. IV. Dublin: James Moore. OCLC 264906028. – Viscounts (for John Butler under Butler, Viscount Mountgarrett)
- Mountmorres, Hervey Redmond Morres, Viscount (1792). The History of the Principal Transactions of the Irish Parliament from the Year 1634 to 1666. Vol. I. London: T. Cadell. OCLC 843863159. – House of Lords
- Smollett, Tobias (1800). The History of England from the revolution to the death of George the Second (Designed as a continuation of Mr. Hume's History). Vol. II (A new ed.). London: T. Cadell. OCLC 6017016. – From the revolution to the death of George II

Peerage of Ireland
Preceded by Charles Butler	Earl of Ormond; Earl of Ossory; 1758–1766	Succeeded by Walter Butler
