= Richard Butler of Kilcash =

Irish landowner (1615–1701)

Richard Butler
- Born: 1615 probably Thurles Castle
- Died: 1701 (aged 85–86); Kilcash Castle
- Spouse: Frances Tuchet (or Touchet)
- Issue Detail: Walter & others
- Father: Thomas Butler
- Mother: Elizabeth Pointz

Richard Butler of Kilcash (1615 – 1701) was an Irish soldier and landowner, the third son of Thomas Butler, Viscount Thurles and brother of James, 1st Duke of Ormonde. He sided with the Irish Confederacy at the Irish Rebellion of 1641. He scouted the enemy on the morning of the Battle of Cloughleagh. His descendants succeeded to the earldom of Ormond when the senior branch of the family failed in 1758.

== Birth and origins ==
Family tree

Richard Butler with wife, parents, and other selected relatives. (Note: This family tree is partly derived from the condensed Butler family tree pictured in Dunboyne. Also see the lists of siblings and children in the text.)

Walter; 11th Earl; 1559–1633 'Beads'	Helen; Butler d. 1631
Thomas; Viscount; Thurles d. 1619 d.v.p.*	Elizabeth; Pointz; 1587–1673	Mervyn; Tuchet; 2nd Earl; 1593–1631
James; 1st Duke; 1610–1688	Elizabeth; Preston; 1615–1684	Richard of Kilcash; 1615–1701	Frances; Tuchet	James; 3rd Earl c. 1617 – 1684
Thomas; 6th Earl; Ossory; 1633–1680 d.v.p.*	Emilia von Nassau; 1635–1688	Walter of Garryricken d. 1700 d.v.p.*	Mary; Plunkett
James; 2nd Duke; 1665–1745	Charles; 1st Earl; Arran; 1671–1758	Thomas of Garryricken d. 1738	Margaret; Magennis; 1673–1744	John; Butler
John de jure 15th Earl d. 1766	Walter de jure 16th Earl d. 1783	Ellen; Morres d. 1794

Legend

XXX	Subject of the article	XXX	Earls and dukes of Ormond	XXX	Earls of Castlehaven

*d.v.p. = predeceased his father (decessit vita patris).

Richard was born in 1615 in southern Ireland. He was the third son of Thomas Butler and his wife Elizabeth Pointz. His father, who was styled Viscount Thurles, was the eldest son and heir apparent of Walter Butler, 11th Earl of Ormond, called "Walter of the rosary beads". His father's family, the Butler dynasty, was Old English and descended from Theobald Walter, who had been appointed Chief Butler of Ireland by King Henry II in 1177.

Richard's mother, Lady Thurles, was an English Catholic, a daughter of Sir John Pointz (died 1633) of Iron Acton in Gloucestershire and his second wife Elizabeth Sydenham (died 1595).

Richard was one of seven siblings, three brothers and four sisters, who are listed in his father's article. To a certain degree Richard lived in the shade of his eldest brother, James, who would become Duke, General, and Lord Lieutenant.

== Early life ==
His eldest brother, James, was born in 1610 in Clerkenwell, London, but his parents returned to Ireland soon after and Richard was born there after the death of his great grand-uncle Black Tom, the 10th Earl, in 1614. In 1619 his father perished on his way from Ireland to England in a shipwreck near the Skerries off the coast of Anglesey. On 24 February 1633, his grandfather died. His brother James succeeded to the earldom as the 12th Earl of Ormond and he was given the lands and the castle of Kilcash as an appanage becoming Richard Butler of Kilcash.

== Marriage and children ==
In 1636, Kilcash, as he now was, married Frances Tuchet (or Touchet; died 1688), youngest daughter of the ill-famed Mervyn Tuchet, 2nd Earl of Castlehaven. This marriage made him the brother-in-law of James, the 3rd Earl of Castlehaven, his future military ally.

Richard and Frances had two sons:

1. Walter (died 1700), known as Walter Butler of Garryricken, married Mary Plunkett, only daughter of Christopher Plunkett, 2nd Earl of Fingall
2. John (died 1714), married Catharine, daughter of James Aylmer, of Cragbryen, County Clare

—and three daughters:

1. Lucia (died 1685), married Sir Laurence Esmond, of Clonegall, County Carlow
2. Mary (died 1737), married Christopher, Lord Delvin
3. Frances (died 1709), married Patrick Barnewall, 3rd Baronet of Crickstown Castle

== Later life ==
He and his family lived in Kilcash Castle at the foot of Slievenamon. In 1639 Kilcash was confirmed in the ownership of the lands of Kilcash, Garryricken, and many others in the counties of Tipperary and Kilkenny by the Commission of Grace with special remainder to the heirs male of his grandfather, Walter Butler, 11th Earl of Ormond and some other family members. These lands would form the Manor of Garryricken.

Late in 1641 or early in 1642, Kilcash sided with the rebellion and was made governor of County Waterford. In January 1642 he was asked to take the city of Waterford but was prevented by the mayor and council. He nevertheless reduced the town of Cappoquin and other places. In March 1642, Kilcash, together with Lord Muskerry, Theobald Purcell, Maurice Roche, 8th Viscount Fermoy, Ikerrin, and Dunboyne unsuccessfully besieged St Leger in Cork. He joined the Irish Catholic Confederation when it was founded in October 1642 and was made an officer in the Confederate Munster Army, which continued the fight of the Munster rebels against the Protestants in southern Munster, which after St Leger's death were led by Murrough O'Brien, 1st Earl of Inchiquin.

On the morning of 4 June 1643, Kilcash scouted the location of a detachment of Inchiquin's troops under Charles Vavasour at Cloughleagh Castle. The intelligence allowed the Munster Army to surprise and defeat Vavasour in the Battle of Cloughleagh. The victory was gained by a cavalry attack led by James Tuchet, 3rd Earl of Castlehaven.

When in October 1645 Giovanni Battista Rinuccini, the papal nuncio, landed at Kenmare on Ireland's west coast, and then made his way from there to Kilkenny, the Confederate capital, the Confederate Supreme Council sent Kilcash with two troops of horse to escort the nuncio through the most dangerous parts of his itinerary in southern Munster, where war raged between the Munster Army and Inchiquin, who was at that time allied with the parliament. Kilcash's protection came a bit late as he met Rinuccini at Drumsicane Castle after the nuncio had already passed much of the dangerous stretch of his route.

Kilcash must not be confused with Richard Butler, the second son of Piers Butler, 1st Viscount Ikerrin, who was in 1647 Lieutenant-General of the Confederate Munster Army under Glamorgan and who was one of the few officers who remained faithful to Glamorgan in his rivalry with Muskerry.

When his side lost to Cromwell's army, Kilcash went into exile in France where he lived, often in poverty, until the Restoration of Charles II who returned his estates to him.

About 1660 Kilcash's son Walter built a house at Garryricken and started to live there with his family.

== Death, succession, and timeline ==
Richard Butler died in 1701 at Kilcash Castle, aged 85 or 86.

He was succeeded by his grandson Colonel Thomas Butler of Garryricken, the heir of his eldest son, Walter Butler of Garryricken. Richard's descendants, dubbed the Garryricken branch, would inherit the earldom of Ormond following the failure of the senior branch that occurred when Charles Butler, 1st Earl of Arran died childless in 1658 (see Family tree). Arran had been de jure 3rd Duke of Ormond and 14th Earl.

Timeline
As his birth date is uncertain, so are all his ages.
Age	Date	Event
0	1615, about	Born.
3–4	1619, 15 Dec	Father drowned at sea. Brother James became heir apparent as Viscount Thurles.
9–10	1625, 27 Mar	Accession of King Charles I, succeeding King James I
17–18	1633, 24 Feb	Grandfather died and brother James succeeded as the 12th Earl of Ormond.
23–24	1639, 24 Jun	Confirmed in the ownership of his estates.
25–26	1641, 23 Oct	Outbreak of the Rebellion
27–28	1643, 4 Jun	Scouted the enemy on the morning of the Battle of Cloughleagh.
29–30	1645, Oct	Welcomed Giovanni Battista Rinuccini on the road from Kenmare to Limerick.
33–34	1649, 30 Jan	King Charles I beheaded.
44–45	1660, 29 May	Restoration of King Charles II
69–70	1685, 6 Feb	Accession of King James II, succeeding King Charles II
73–74	1689, 13 Feb	Accession of William and Mary, succeeding King James II
85–86	1701, 24 Jun	Died at Kilcash Castle.

== Notes and references ==
=== Sources ===
- Bagwell, Richard (1909). Ireland under the Stuarts and under the Interregnum. Vol. II. London: Longmans, Green, and Co. OCLC 458582656. – 1642 to 1660
- Burke, Bernard; Burke, Ashworth Peter (1915). A Genealogical and Heraldic History of the Peerage and Baronetage, the Privy Council, Knightage and Companionage (77th ed.). London: Harrison. OCLC 1155471554.
- Carrigan, Rev William (1905). The History and Antiquities of the Diocese of Ossory. Vol. IV. Dublin: Sealy Bryers & Walker. OCLC 29384778.
- Castlehaven, James Touchet (1815) [1st pub. 1684]. Earl of Castlehaven's Review or his Memoirs of his Engagement and Carriage in the Irish Wars. Dublin: George Mullens. OCLC 906518547.
- Coffey, Diarmid (1914). O'Neill and Ormond – A Chapter of Irish History. Dublin: Maunsel & Company. OCLC 906164979.
- Cokayne, George Edward (1895). Complete Peerage of England, Scotland, Ireland, Great Britain and the United Kingdom, Extant, Extinct, or Dormant. Vol. VI (1st ed.). London: George Bell and Sons. OCLC 1180818801. – N to R (for Ormond)
- Debrett, John (1828). Peerage of the United Kingdom of Great Britain and Ireland. Vol. II (17th ed.). London: F. C. and J. Rivington. OCLC 54499602. – Scotland and Ireland
- Duignan, Aoife (October 2009). McGuire, James; Quinn, James (eds.). "Butler, Piers". Dictionary of Irish Biography.
- Dunboyne, Patrick Theobald Tower Butler, Baron (1968). Butler Family History (2nd ed.). Kilkenny: Rothe House.
- Flood, John (2020). Kilcash and the Butlers of Ormond: Conflict and Kinship from the Middle Ages to the Great Famine. Dublin: Geography Publications. ISBN 978-0-906602-94-2. – Google Books no preview
- Fryde, Edmund Boleslaw; Greenway, D. E.; Porter, S.; Roy, I., eds. (1986). Handbook of British Chronology. Royal Historical Society Guides and Handbooks, No. 2 (3rd ed.). London: Offices of the Royal Historical Society. ISBN 0-86193-106-8. – (for timeline)
- Lee, Philip (1914). "Notes on Some Castles in Mid Cork" (PDF). Journal of the Cork Historical and Archaeological Society. 20: 57–68. – Dundareirke, Carrignacurra, Drumcarragh, Carrignaneela, Ballybodan, Courtbrack, Kilmeedy, Drishane, Droumsicane, Dromagh
- Lodge, John (1789). Archdall, Mervyn (ed.). The Peerage of Ireland or, A Genealogical History of the Present Nobility of that Kingdom. Vol. IV. Dublin: James Moore. OCLC 264906028. – Viscounts (for Butler, Viscount Mountgarrett)
- McGrath, Brid (1997). "William St. Leger (c1580–1642) Cork County". A Biographical Dictionary of the Membership of the Irish House of Commons 1640 to 1641 (Ph.D.). Vol. 1. Dublin: Trinity College. pp. 265–266. hdl:2262/77206. – Parliaments & Biographies (PDF downloadable from given URL)
- Meehan, Rev. Charles Patrick (1882). The Confederation of Kilkenny (New revised and enlarged ed.). Dublin: James Duffy. OCLC 224157081.
- Warner, Ferdinand (1768). History of the Rebellion and Civil-War in Ireland. Vol. I. Dublin: James William. OCLC 82770539. – 1641 to 1643
