= Thomas Butler of Garryricken =

Irish Jacobite soldier (died 1738)

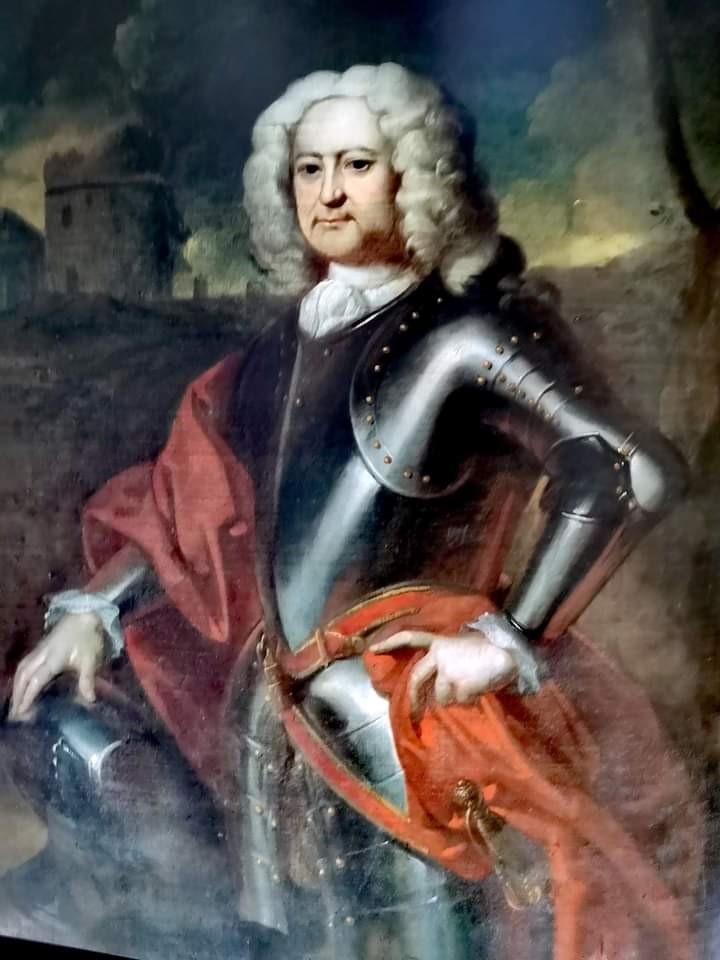
- Detail from the portrait below
- Died: 1738
- Family: Butler dynasty
- Spouse: Margaret Burke
- Issue Detail: John & others
- Father: Walter Butler
- Mother: Mary Plunkett

Colonel Thomas Butler of Garryricken (died 1738), also known as Thomas Butler of Kilcash, was an Irish Jacobite soldier. He commanded a regiment, Thomas Butler's foot, during the Williamite War and fought at the Battle of Aughrim in 1691 where he was taken captive. His son John would, de jure, become the 15th Earl of Ormond.

== Birth and origins ==
Thomas was probably born at Garryricken, near Callan, County Kilkenny, as the eldest son of Walter Butler and his wife Mary Plunkett. His father, known as Walter Butler of Garryricken (died 1700), belonged to a cadet branch of the Butler Dynasty, being the son of Richard Butler of Kilcash (died 1701), who was a younger brother of the 1st Duke of Ormond. Thomas's father had built Garryricken House around 1660. The Butler dynasty is an Old English family that descends from Theobald Walter, who had been appointed Chief Butler of Ireland by King Henry II in 1177.

Thomas's mother was the only daughter of Christopher Plunkett, 2nd Earl of Fingall.

Family tree

Thomas Butler with wife, parents, and other selected relatives. (Note: This family tree is derived from two published trees, and classical genealogical sources. Also see the list of siblings and children in the text.)

Thomas; Viscount; Thurles d. 1619 d.v.p.*	Elizabeth; Pointz; 1587–1673	Luke; Plunket; 1st Earl of Fingall d. 1637
James; 1st Duke; Ormond; 1610–1688	Elizabeth; Preston; 1615–1684	Richard of Kilcash; 1615–1701	Frances; Tuchet	Christopher; Plunket; 2nd Earl of Fingall d. 1649
Thomas; 6th Earl; Ossory; 1633–1680	Emilia von Nassau; 1635–1688	Walter of Garryricken d. 1700 d.v.p.*	Mary; Plunkett
James; 2nd Duke; Ormond; 1665–1745	Charles; Earl; Arran; 1671–1758	Thomas of Garryricken d. 1738; Colonel	Margaret; Magennis; 1673–1744	John; Butler
John de jure 15th Earl d. 1766	Bridget; Stacey	Walter de jure 16th Earl; 1703–1783

Legend

XXX	Subject of the article	XXX	Earls and dukes of Ormond	XXX	Earls of Fingall

*d.v.p. = predeceased his father (decessit vita patris)

Thomas listed among his brothers
He heads the list of brothers below as the eldest:
1. Thomas (died 1738)
2. John, who is known as John of Garryricken and whose son became Walter Butler, 16th Earl of Ormonde
3. Christopher (1673–1757), who became Roman Catholic Archbishop of Cashel

Thomas's sisters
1. Mary, who married James Tobin of Kaemshinagh in County Tipperary
2. Frances, who married a Mr. Gould
3. Lucy (died 1703), who married, April 1697, Sir Walter Butler, 3rd Baronet of Polestown
4. Helen, who married Maurice FitzGerald of Castle Ishen in County Cork

Thomas is known as Thomas Butler of Garryricken or as Thomas Butler of Kilcash because he lived at Kilcash Castle and owned half of the Garryricken Manor; his brother John had the other half and lived at Garryricken House.

== Williamite War ==
He fought for James II during the Williamite War in Ireland, being the colonel of an infantry regiment, known as "Thomas Butler's Foot". Colonel Thomas Butler was taken prisoner at the Battle of Aughrim in 1691.

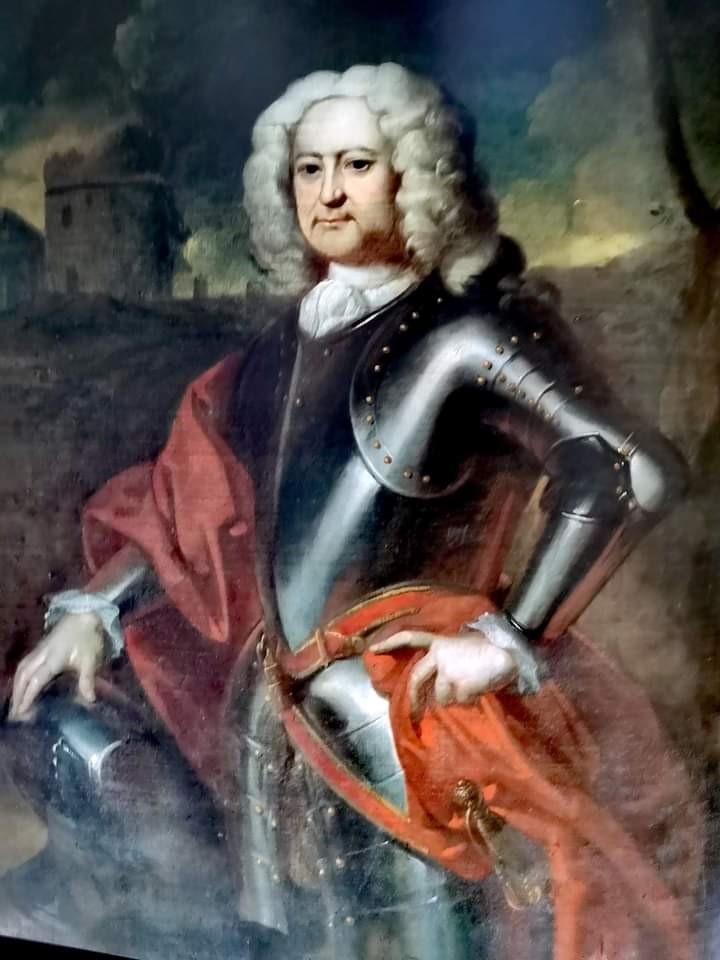
Colonel Thomas Butler of Garryricken

== Marriage and children ==
In 1696, he married Margaret Burke, eldest daughter of William Burke, 7th Earl of Clanricarde, widow of Bryan Magennis, Viscount Iveagh. She is remembered by the Irish song Kilcash.

Thomas and Margaret had three sons:

1. Richard (died 1711), who died of a fall from his horse at Kilcash
2. Walter, who died of smallpox while at the Royal Academy of Painting and Sculpture in Paris
3. John (died 1766), who became the de jure 15th Earl of Ormond and inherited the Ormond estate

—and five daughters:

1. Mary, who married Bryan Kavanagh, of Borris, County Carlow
2. Honora (died 1730), who married Valentine Browne, 3rd Viscount Kenmare, in 1720
3. Hellen, who married firstly Captain Richard Esmond, brother of Sir Laurence Esmond, Baronet, and secondly, Richard Butler of Westcourt
4. Margaret, who married George Matthew of Thurles, afterward of Thomastown
5. Catharine, who became the third wife of James Mandeville of Ballydine, and had no issue. She married Richard Pascoe and had issue.

== Grandfather's succession ==
His father, Walter of Garryricken, died in 1700; his grandfather, Richard of Kilcash, followed in 1701. His father therefore predeceased his grandfather by a year. His grandfather's estate was the Garryricken Manor given to him in 1639. The manor's lands were divided between Thomas and his brother John. Thomas received Kilcash while John received Garryricken.

== Death, succession, and timeline ==
Thomas Butler died in 1738. He was succeeded by his son John, who would become the de jure 15th Earl of Ormond in 1658.

Timeline
As his birth date is uncertain, so are all his ages.
Age	Date	Event
0	1670, estimate	Born, (Note: The estimate of his birth year in the timeline is based on the birth, in 1673, of Christopher, the third and youngest of the three brothers.) probably at Garryricken House
2–3	1673	Brother Christopher born
14–15	1685, 6 Feb	Accession of King James II, succeeding King Charles II
18–19	1689, 13 Feb	Accession of William and Mary, succeeding King James II
20–21	1691, 12 Jul	Taken prisoner at the Battle of Aughrim
25–26	1696	Married Margaret Magennis
29–30	1700	Father predeceased grandfather.
30–31	1701	Inherited Kilcash at the death of his grandfather
43–44	1714, 1 Aug	Accession of King George I, succeeding Queen Anne
67–68	1738	Died

== Notes and references ==
=== Sources ===
- Boulger, Demetrius Charles (1911). The Battle of the Boyne. London: Martin Secker. OCLC 1041056932.
- Brewer, James Norris (1829). A History of Leinster: Embracing the beauties of Dublin, Wicklow, Wexford, Kilkenny &c. &c. London: J. S. Taylor & Co. OCLC 875191110. (for Garryricken)
- Burke, Bernard; Burke, Ashworth Peter (1915). A Genealogical and Heraldic History of the Peerage and Baronetage, the Privy Council, Knightage and Companionage (77th ed.). London: Harrison. OCLC 1155471554.
- Carrigan, Rev William (1905). The History and Antiquities of the Diocese of Ossory. Vol. IV. Dublin: Sealy Bryers & Walker. OCLC 29384778.
- Cokayne, George Edward (1895). Complete Peerage of England, Scotland, Ireland, Great Britain and the United Kingdom, Extant, Extinct, or Dormant. Vol. VI (1st ed.). London: George Bell and Sons. OCLC 1180818801. – N to R (for Ormonde)
- Cokayne, George Edward (1926). Gibbs, Vicary (ed.). The complete peerage of England, Scotland, Ireland, Great Britain and the United Kingdom, extant, extinct, or dormant. Vol. V (2nd ed.). London: St Catherine Press. OCLC 228661424. – Eardley of Spalding to Goojerat (for Fingall)
- D'Alton, John (1855). Illustrations, historical and genealogical, of King James's Irish army list, 1689. Dublin: Published by the author. OCLC 838655763.
- Debrett, John (1828). Peerage of the United Kingdom of Great Britain and Ireland. Vol. II (17th ed.). London: F. C. and J. Rivington. OCLC 54499602. – Scotland and Ireland
- Dunboyne, Patrick Theobald Tower Butler, Baron (1968). Butler Family History (2nd ed.). Kilkenny: Rothe House.
- Fryde, Edmund Boleslaw; Greenway, D. E.; Porter, S.; Roy, I., eds. (1986). Handbook of British Chronology. Royal Historical Society Guides and Handbooks, No. 2 (3rd ed.). London: Offices of the Royal Historical Society. ISBN 0-86193-106-8. – (for timeline)
- Lodge, John (1789). Archdall, Mervyn (ed.). The Peerage of Ireland or, A Genealogical History of the Present Nobility of that Kingdom. Vol. IV. Dublin: James Moore. OCLC 264906028. – Viscounts (for Butler, Viscount Mountgarret)
- Mangan, James Clarence (1850). The Poets and Poetry of Munster. Dublin: John O'Daly. OCLC 561811673.
- Mountmorres, Hervey Redmond Morres, Viscount (1792). The History of the Principal Transactions of the Irish Parliament from the Year 1634 to 1666. Vol. I. London: T. Cadell. OCLC 843863159. – House of Lords
