= Margaret Magennis, Viscountess Iveagh =

Irish viscountess (1673–1744)

Margaret Magennis, née Burke
- Viscountess Iveagh
- Born: Margaret Burke; 1673
- Died: 19 July 1744 (aged 70–71); Kilcash Castle
- Spouses: 1. Bryan, 5th Viscount Iveagh; 2. Thomas Butler of Garryricken
- Issue Detail: John & others
- Father: William, 7th Earl of Clanricarde
- Mother: Helen MacCarty

Margaret Magennis, Viscountess Iveagh (/ˈaɪveɪ/ EYE-vay; née Burke; 1673–1744), also known as Margaret Butler, was the mother of John Butler, the de jure 15th Earl of Ormond. She is remembered by the song A Lament for Kilcash.

== Birth and origins ==
Margaret was born in 1673 as the eldest daughter of William Burke and his second wife Helen MacCarty. Her father was the 7th Earl of Clanricarde. The Burkes were an Old English family. Margaret's mother was her father's second wife and the eldest daughter of Donough MacCarty, 1st Earl of Clancarty. The MacCartys were a Gaelic family. Both parents were Roman Catholic. Her parents had married in 1669.

Her father's first wife had been Lettice, daughter of Henry Shirley, an English baronet, and a Protestant. Margaret had half-siblings from her father's first marriage. Her mother also had been married before, but that marriage had been childless.

Margaret was one of four siblings, but she also had half-brothers from her father's first marriage. Both are listed in her father's article.

Family tree

Margaret Burke with her two husbands, one notable child, her parents, and other relatives. (Note: This family tree is based on genealogies of the Earls of Clancarty, the MacCarthy of Muskerry family, and the Earls of Ormond. Also see the lists of siblings and children in the text.)

Ulick; Burke; 3rd Earl; Clanricarde d. 1601	Thomas; Viscount; Thurles d. 1619 d.v.p.*
Sir; William; Burke d. 1625	Donough; 1st Earl; Clancarty; 1594–1665	Eleanor; Butler; 1612–1682	James; Butler; 1st Duke; Ormond; 1610–1688
Lettice; Shirley; 1617–1655	William; Burke; 7th Earl; Clanricarde d. 1687	Helen; MacCarty d. 1722	Justin; Viscount; Mount- cashel d. 1694
Ulick; Burke; 1670–1691	Bryan; Magennis; 5th Viscount; Iveagh	Margaret; Burke; 1673–1744	Thomas; Butler of Garryricken d. 1738	Honora; Burke; 1674–1698
John de jure 15th Earl; Ormond d. 1766	Bridget; Stacey

Legend

XXX	Margaret; Magennis	XXX	Earls of Clanricarde	XXX	Earls & dukes of Ormond	XXX	Earls of Clancarty

*d.v.p. = predeceased his father (decessit vita patris).

== First marriage ==
Margaret married twice. She married first in 1689 Bryan Magennis, 5th Viscount Iveagh, from County Down in Ulster. He supported King James II, was attainted and took Austrian service. He died in 1693. The marriage seems to have been childless.

She seems to have fled to Limerick at the end of the Williamite War, at least she is mentioned among the people that were allowed to leave Galway for Limerick when Henry, 8th Viscount Dillon, surrendered the town to Ginkel on 26 July 1691.

== Second marriage and children ==
In 1696 she married secondly Colonel Thomas Butler of Garryricken, also known as Thomas Butler of Kilcash, the grandson of Richard Butler of Kilcash.

Thomas and Margaret three sons:

1. Richard Butler (died 1711), who died of a fall from his horse at Kilcash.
2. Walter Butler, who died of smallpox at the Royal Academy at Paris.
3. John Butler (died 1766), who became de jure the 15th Earl of Ormond and inherited the estates of Richard Butler, 1st Earl of Arran but died childless.

—and five daughters:

1. Mary Butler, who married Bryan Cavanagh, of Borris, County Carlow.
2. Honora Butler (died 1730), who married Valentine, Lord Kenmare, in November 1720.
3. Hellen Butler, who married firstly Mr Esmond, and secondly, Richard Butler of Westcourt.
4. Margaret Butler (died 1743), who married George Matthew of Thurles, afterward of Thomastown. and
5. Catharine Butler, who became the third wife of James Mandeville, of Ballydine.

== Death ==
She died on 19 July 1744 at Kilcash Castle. She is buried in the Butler Mausoleum at Kilcash. She is also remembered by the nineteenth-century Irish song 'A Lament for Kilcash', which was written in her memory.

== Notes and references ==
=== Sources ===
- Boulger, Demetrius Charles (1911). The Battle of the Boyne. London: Martin Secker. OCLC 1041056932.
- Burke, Bernard (1866). A Genealogical History of the Dormant, Abeyant, Forfeited and Extinct Peerages of the British Empire (New ed.). London: Harrison. OCLC 11501348. – (for Clanricarde, Ormond, and Shirley under Ferrers)
- Burke, Bernard; Burke, Ashworth Peter (1915). A Genealogical and Heraldic History of the Peerage and Baronetage, the Privy Council, Knightage and Companionage (77th ed.). London: Harrison. OCLC 1155471554.
- Burke, Jim (2005). A History of De Burgo, De Burgh, De Burca, Burke, Bourke. Ireland: Séamus de Búrka. OCLC 619552006. – Jim Burke!
- Cokayne, George Edward (1893). Complete peerage of England, Scotland, Ireland, Great Britain and the United Kingdom, extant, extinct, or dormant. Vol. V (1st ed.). London: George Bell and Sons. OCLC 1180836840. – L to M (for Magennis)
- Cokayne, George Edward (1913). Gibbs, Vicary (ed.). The complete peerage of England, Scotland, Ireland, Great Britain and the United Kingdom, extant, extinct, or dormant. Vol. III (2nd ed.). London: St Catherine Press. OCLC 228661424. – Canonteign to Cutts (for Clanricarde)
- Debrett, John (1828). Peerage of the United Kingdom of Great Britain and Ireland. Vol. II (17th ed.). London: F. C. and J. Rivington. OCLC 54499602. – Scotland and Ireland
- Lainé, P. Louis (1836). "Mac-Carthy". Archives généalogiques et historiques de la noblesse de France [Genealogical and Historical Archives of the Nobility of France] (in French). Vol. Tome cinquième. Paris: Imprimerie de Bethune et Plon. pp. 1–102. OCLC 865941166.
- Lodge, John (1789a). Archdall, Mervyn (ed.). The Peerage of Ireland or, A Genealogical History of the Present Nobility of that Kingdom. Vol. I. Dublin: James Moore. OCLC 264906028. – Blood royal, dukes, earls (for Clanricarde)
- Lodge, John (1789b). Archdall, Mervyn (ed.). The Peerage of Ireland or, A Genealogical History of the Present Nobility of that Kingdom. Vol. IV. Dublin: James Moore. OCLC 264906028. – Viscounts (for Butler, Viscount Mountgarret)
- Mangan, James Clarence (1850). The Poets and Poetry of Munster. Dublin: John O'Daly. OCLC 561811673.
