= Charles Butler, Earl of Arran =

Irish peer and soldier (1671–1758)

Lieutenant-General The Right Honourable The Earl of Arran
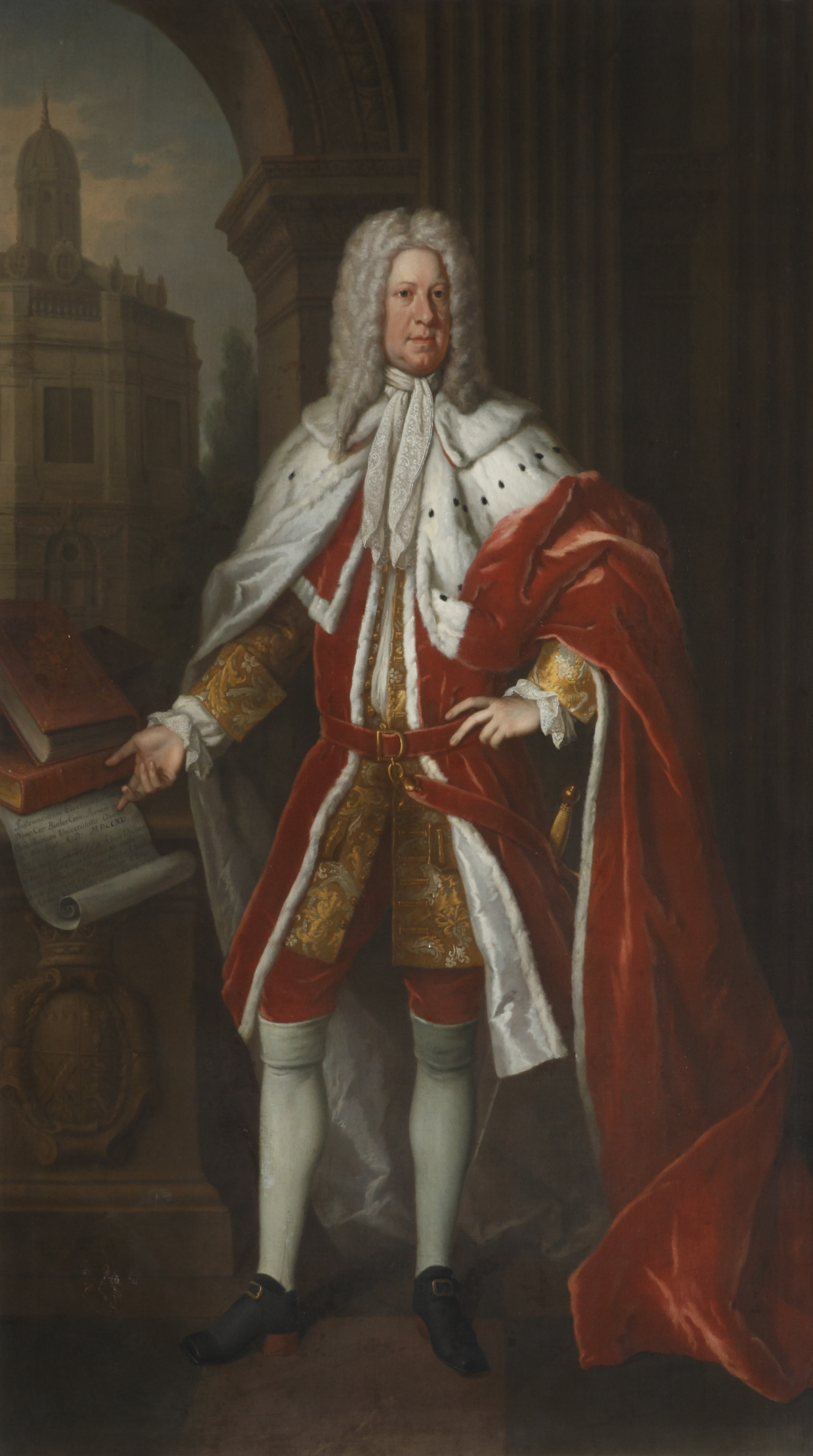
- Portrait by James Thornhill
- Tenure: 1722–1758
- Born: 4 September 1671
- Died: 17 December 1758 (aged 87)
- Family: Butler dynasty
- Spouse: Elizabeth Crew
- Father: Thomas Butler, 6th Earl of Ossory
- Mother: Emilia von Nassau

Lieutenant-General Charles Butler, Earl of Arran (of the second creation), de jure 3rd Duke of Ormonde (1671–1758), was an Anglo-Irish peer. His uncle Richard was the Earl of Arran of the first creation. The titles were re-created for Charles in 1693. His elder brother, the 2nd Duke of Ormonde, was attainted during the Jacobite rising of 1715, but in 1721 Arran was allowed to buy the estate back. At the death of the 2nd Duke, he succeeded as de jure 3rd Duke of Ormonde in the Irish peerage but did not claim the title.

== Birth and origin ==
Charles was born on 4 September 1671. He was the youngest son of Thomas Butler and his wife Emilia. His father was known as Lord Ossory and was heir apparent of James Butler, 1st Duke of Ormond, but predeceased him and so never became duke. His father's family, the Butler dynasty, was Old English and descended from Theobald Walter, who had been appointed Chief Butler of Ireland by King Henry II in 1177.

Charles's mother was Dutch. Her family was a cadet branch of the House of Nassau. Both parents were Protestant. They had married on 17 November 1659 N.S.

Family tree

Charles Butler with wife, parents, and other selected relatives. (Note: This family tree is partly derived from the condensed Butler family tree pictured in Dunboyne. Also see the lists of siblings in the text.)

Thomas; Viscount; Thurles d. 1619 d.v.p.*	Elizabeth; Pointz; 1587–1673
James; 1st Duke; 1610–1688	Elizabeth; Preston; 1615–1684	Richard B. of Kilcash; 1615–1701
Thomas; 6th Earl; Ossory; 1633–1680 d.v.p.*	Emilia von Nassau; 1635–1688	Richard; Earl; Arran; 1639–1684	Walter B. of Garryricken d. 1700 d.v.p.*
James; 2nd Duke; Ormond; 1665–1745	Charles; 1st Earl; Arran; 1671–1758	Elizabeth; Crew d. 1756	Amelia; Butler d. 1760 unmarried	Thomas B. of Garryricken d. 1738
Elizabeth; Butler d. 1750 unmarried	John de jure 15th Earl d. 1766

Legend

XXX	Subject of the article	XXX	Earls & dukes of Ormond

*d.v.p. = predeceased his father (decessit vita patris)

He was one of eleven siblings, but not all seem to be known by name. Lists of his brothers and sisters can be found in his father's article.

== Early life ==
Arms of Charles Butler, Earl of Arran

Charles's father died in 1680 when he was eight years old. In 1688 his grandfather, Lord Ormond, died. Charles's elder brother succeeded as 2nd Duke of Ormond. In 1693, Charles Butler was ennobled as Baron of Cloughgrenan, Viscount of Tullogh and Earl of Arran (of the second creation) in the Peerage of Ireland. Lord Arran, as he was now, was in the following year also made an English peer by creating him Baron Butler of Weston in County Huntingdon, in the Peerage of England.

== Military career ==
Arran pursued a career in the Irish army. In 1697 he was appointed Colonel of the 6th Horse (later 5th Dragoon Guards), a post he held until 1703. In 1699 his brother James resigned his place in the bed chamber, which was given to Arran, who thus became Lord of the Bedchamber to King William III, which office he retained until the King's death in 1702. On 24 January 1702 he was promoted Brigadier General. In 1703 Arran was appointed Colonel of the 3rd Troop of Horse Guards, a post he held until 1715. On 1 January 1704 he was promoted Major General.

== Marriage ==
On 3 June 1705 he married Elizabeth Crew, daughter of Thomas Crew, 2nd Baron Crew, by his second wife, Anne Armine, daughter of Sir William Armine, 2nd Baronet, in Oatlands near Weybridge in Surrey. The marriage was to stay childless.

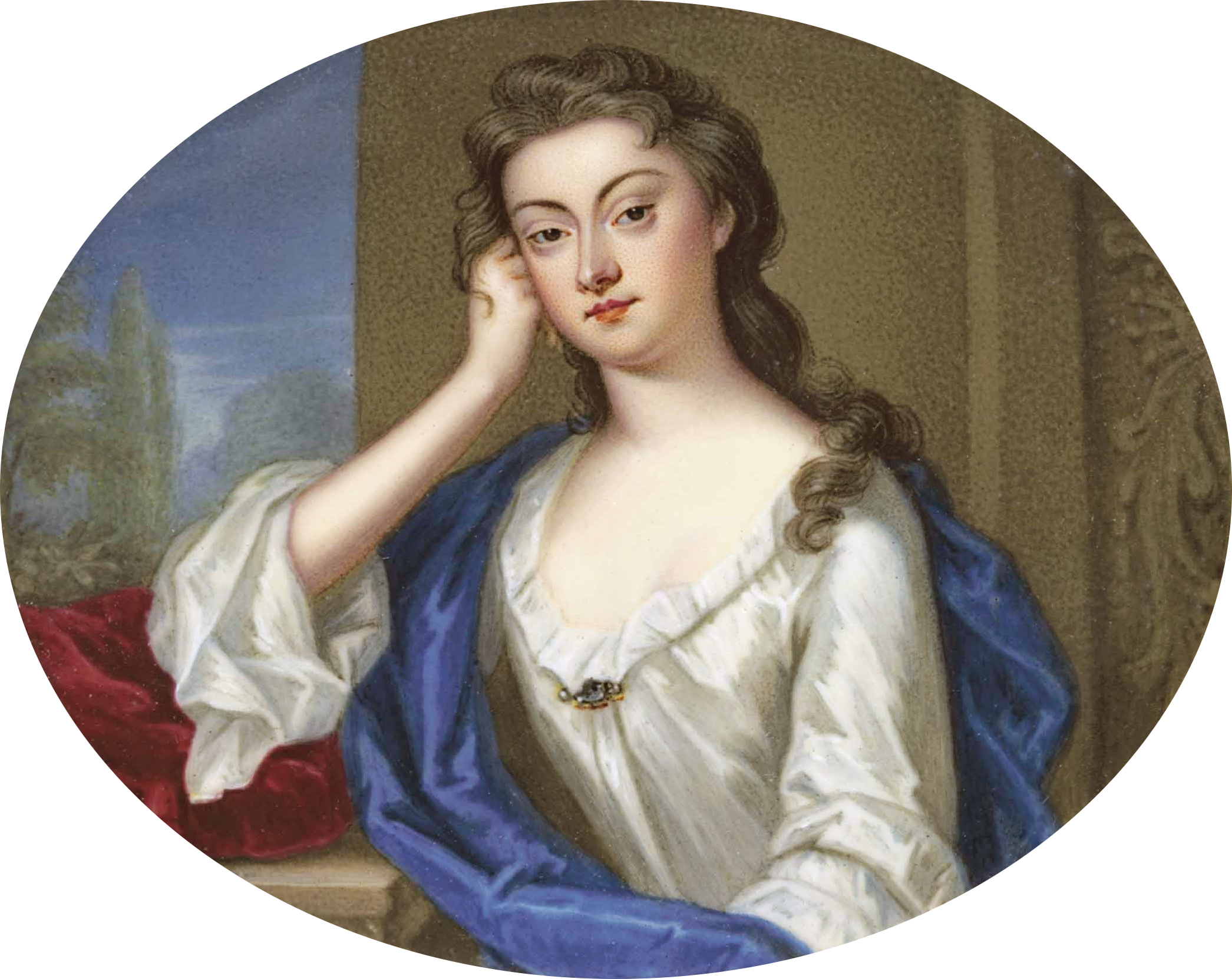
Elizabeth, Countess of Arran, by C. F. Zincke

== Further promotions ==
On 22 April 1708 he was promoted Lieutenant-General, his final rank in the Army. From November 1712 to 1714 he was Master-General of the Ordnance in Ireland.

== Brother's attainder ==
His eldest brother, the 2nd duke of Ormond, got involved in the Jacobite rising of 1715. He was impeached for high treason by Lord Stanhope on 21 June 1715. He was attainted by the Attainder of Duke of Ormonde Act 1714 (1 Geo. 1. St. 2. c. 17), whereupon all his honours were assumed to have been forfeit. In 1721 Arran was allowed by act of the British Parliament, the Crown Lands (Forfeited Estates) Act 1720 (7 Geo. 1. St. 1. c. 22), to buy back the family estates that had been forfeited under his brother's attainder.

Arran participated in the Atterbury Plot of the early 1720s. and should have been the commander of all Jacobite forces in England and Ireland. But the plot was betrayed and the rising never took place. On 2 January 1722, the Old Pretender (Jacobite "King James III") created Charles Duke of Arran in the Jacobite Peerage of England.

On 16 November 1745 N.S., his brother died in Avignon. It was later ruled that the attainder, enacted by the Parliament of Great Britain, applied to his British titles (i.e. those in the Peerages of England and Scotland) but not to his Irish titles. Lord Arran therefore de jure succeeded on his brother's death on 5 November 1745 as 3rd Duke of Ormonde in the Peerage of Ireland, but was not aware of this succession and never assumed the title.

The attainders of the Barony of Butler (of Moore Park) and the Lordship of Dingwall would be reversed in 1871. It, therefore, matters how the claims to these titles were transmitted. Both these titles had the particularity of being able to pass through the female line. In 1745 the claim to these titles, therefore, passed to Elizabeth Butler, his brother's only surviving child, who would therefore have been Baroness Dingwall and Baroness Butler in her own right (suo jure). Elizabeth died unmarried in 1750 and the claims passed to Arran, her uncle.

== Death, succession, and timeline ==
Lord Arran died at his lodgings at Whitehall on 17 December 1758 and was buried in St. Margaret's Church, Westminster. On his death, the Earldom of Arran, the Barony of Butler (of Weston), and the Jacobite Dukedom of Arran (such as it was) became extinct, along with the Dukedom and Marquessate of Ormonde. The rest of his de jure Irish titles, including the Earldom of Ormonde, passed to his kinsman John Butler (de jure 15th Earl), but remained dormant. Arran's considerable estate was inherited by his unmarried sister Amelia and on her death in 1760 to John Butler.

His claims to the Barony of Butler (of Moore Park) and the Lordship of Dingwall passed to his niece, Frances Elliot, eldest daughter of Arran's sister Henrietta who had married the 1st Earl of Grantham. From Frances the claims eventually passed to the Earls Cowper (descendants of Lord Grantham's youngest daughter). In 1871 the attainder was finally reversed in favour of the 7th Earl.

Horace Walpole called Arran "an inoffensive old man, the last male of the illustrious house of Ormond ... and much respected by the Jacobites ...".

Timeline
Age	Date	Event
0	1671, 4 Sep	Born.
8	1680, 30 Jul	Father died.
13	1685, 6 Feb	Accession of King James II, succeeding King Charles II
16	1688, 21 Jul	His brother succeeded as 2nd Duke as their grandfather died.
17	1689, 13 Feb	Accession of William and Mary, succeeding King James II
21	1693, 8 Mar	Created Earl of Arran.
22	1694, 23 Jan	Created Baron Butler of Weston in England.
25–26	1697	Appointed Colonel of the 6th Horse (later 5th Dragoon Guards) until 1703.
27–28	1699	Appointed a lord of the bedchamber to King William III.
30	1702, 24 Jan	Promoted Brigadier General
30	1702, 8 Mar	Accession of Queen Anne, succeeding King William III
31–32	1703	Appointed Colonel of the 3rd Troop of Horse Guards.
32	1704, 1 Jan	Promoted Major-General
33	1705, 3 Jun	Married Elizabeth Crew in Surrey, England.
36	1708, 22 Apr	Promoted Lieutenant-General
41	1713, 11 Apr	Peace of Utrecht ended the War of the Spanish Succession.
42	1714, 1 Aug	Accession of King George I, succeeding Queen Anne
43	1715, 21 Jun	Brother impeached for treason
49–50	1721	Allowed to buy back his brother's estate
50	1722, 2 Jan	Created Duke of Arran by the Old Pretender
55	1727, 11 Jun	Accession of King George II, succeeding King George I
74	1745, 5 Nov	Succeeded his brother as the de jure 3rd Duke of Ormond
87	1758, 17 Dec	Died in London

== Notes and references ==
=== Sources ===
- Airy, Osmund (1886). "Butler, James, twelfth Earl and first Duke OF Ormonde(1610–1688)". In Lee, Sidney (ed.). Dictionary of National Biography. Vol. 8. New York: MacMillan and Co. pp. 52–60. (for his grandfather)
- Burke, Bernard; Burke, Ashworth P. (1909). A Genealogical and Heraldic History of the Peerage and Baronetage, the Privy Council, Knightage and Companionage (71st ed.). London: Harrison.
- Burke, Bernard; Burke, Ashworth Peter (1915). A Genealogical and Heraldic History of the Peerage and Baronetage, the Privy Council, Knightage and Companionage (77th ed.). London: Harrison. OCLC 1155471554.
- Cokayne, George Edward (1895). The complete peerage of England, Scotland, Ireland, Great Britain and the United Kingdom, extant, extinct, or dormant. Vol. 6 (1st ed.). London: George Bell and Sons. – N to R (for Ossory under Ormond)
- Cokayne, George Edward (1910). Gibbs, Vicary (ed.). The complete peerage of England, Scotland, Ireland, Great Britain and the United Kingdom, extant, extinct, or dormant. Vol. 1 (2nd ed.). London: St Catherine Press. – Ab-Adam to Basing (for Arran)
- Cokayne, George Edward (1916). Gibbs, Vicary (ed.). The complete peerage of England, Scotland, Ireland, Great Britain and the United Kingdom, extant, extinct, or dormant. Vol. 4 (2nd ed.). London: St Catherine Press. – Dacre to Dysart (for Dingwall)
- Davies, J. D. (2004). "Butler, Thomas, sixth earl of Ossory (1634–1680)". In Matthew, Henry Colin Gray.; Harrison, Brian (eds.). Oxford Dictionary of National Biography. Vol. 9. New York: Oxford University Press. pp. 226–229. ISBN 0-19-861359-8.
- Debrett, John (1828). Peerage of the United Kingdom of Great Britain and Ireland. Vol. 2 (17th ed.). London: F. C. and J. Rivington. – Scotland and Ireland
- Dunboyne, Patrick Theobald Tower Butler, Baron (1968). Butler Family History (2nd ed.). Kilkenny: Rothe House.
- Fryde, E. B.; Greenway, D. E.; Porter, S.; Roy, I., eds. (1986). Handbook of British Chronology. Royal Historical Society Guides and Handbooks, No. 2 (3rd ed.). London: Offices of the Royal Historical Society. ISBN 0-86193-106-8. (for timeline)
- Handley, Stuart (2004). "Butler, James, second duke of Ormond (1665–1745)". In Matthew, Henry Colin Gray.; Harrison, Brian (eds.). Oxford Dictionary of National Biography. Vol. 9. New York: Oxford University Press. pp. 163–168. ISBN 0-19-861359-8. (for his brother)
- Lodge, John (1789). The Peerage of Ireland. Vol. 4. Dublin: James Moore. – Viscounts (for Ossory under Butler, Viscount Mountgarrett)
- Miller, Peggy (1971). James: Old Pretender. New York: St. Martin's Press. ISBN 9780049230569.
- Ruvigny, Melville Henry, Marquis de (1904). Jacobite Peerage Baronetage Knightage and Grants of Honour. Edinburgh: T C & E C Jack.
- Smollett, Tobias (1800). The History of England. Vol. 2 (A new ed.). London: T. Cadell. – From the revolution to the death of George the Second.
- Walcott, Rev. MacKenzie Edward Charles (1847). The History of the Parish Church of Saint Margaret, in Westminster. London: W. Blanchard & Sons.
- Walpole, Horace (1822). Memoires of the Last Ten Years of the Reign of George the Second. Vol. 2. London: John Murray. – 1756 to 1760

Military offices
Preceded by John Coy	Colonel of The Earl of Arran's Regiment of Horse; 1697–1703	Succeeded by William Cadogan
Preceded by The Earl Rivers	Captain and Colonel of the 3rd Troop of Horse Guards; 1703–1715	Succeeded by George Cholmondeley
Academic offices
Preceded by The Duke of Ormonde	Chancellor of the University of Oxford; 1715–1759	Succeeded by The Earl of Westmorland
Peerage of England
New creation	— TITULAR — Duke of Arran; Jacobite peerage 1722–1758	Extinct
New creation	Baron Butler; 1694–1758	Extinct
Peerage of Ireland
Preceded by James Butler	Duke of Ormonde (de jure); 1745–1758	Extinct
Preceded by James Butler	Earl of Ormonde (de jure); 1745–1758	Succeeded by John Butler
New creation	Earl of Arran; 1693–1758	Extinct
