= Thomas Butler, Viscount Thurles =

Irish lord (died 1619)

Thomas Butler
- Viscount Thurles (courtesy title)
- Died: 15 December 1619 at sea, off the Skerries
- Spouse: Elizabeth Poyntz
- Issue Detail: James, Richard, & others
- Father: Walter Butler, 11th Earl of Ormond
- Mother: Helen Butler

Thomas Butler, Viscount Thurles (before 1596 – 1619) was the son and heir apparent of Walter Butler, 11th Earl of Ormond (1559–1633), whom he predeceased. He lived at the Westgate Castle in Thurles, County Tipperary. He was accused of treason but drowned in a shipwreck off the Skerries in the Irish Sea, before he could be judged. He was the father of the Irish statesman and Royalist commander James Butler, 1st Duke of Ormonde.

Family tree

Thomas Butler, Viscount Thurles, with wife, parents, and other selected relatives. (Note: This family tree is partly derived from the condensed Butler family tree pictured in Dunboyne. Also see the lists of children in the text.)

John of Kilcash d. 1570	Katherine; MacCarthy
Walter; 11th Earl; 1559 – 1632/3 'Beads'	Helen; Butler d. 1631	John Pointz d. 1633
Thomas; Viscount; Thurles d. 1619 d.v.p.*	Elizabeth; Pointz; 1587–1673
James; 1st Duke; 1610–1688	Elizabeth; Preston; 1615–1684	Richard of Kilcash; 1615–1701	Frances; Tuchet
Thomas; 6th Earl; Ossory; 1633–1680 d.v.p.*	Emilia von Nassau; 1635–1688	Walter of Garryricken d. 1700	Mary; Plunket
James; 2nd Duke; 1665–1745	Charles; 1st Earl; Arran; 1671–1758	Thomas of Garryricken d. 1738	John; Butler
John de jure 15th Earl d. 1766	Walter de jure 16th Earl d. 1783

Legend

XXX	Thomas; Butler	XXX	Earls & dukes of Ormond

*d.v.p. = predeceased his father (decessit vita patris)

== Birth and origins ==
Thomas was born in 1594, the eldest son of Walter Butler and his wife Helen Butler. At the time of his birth, his father was a nephew of the ruling earl, Black Tom, the 10th earl of Ormond. His father's family, the Butler Dynasty, was Old English and descended from Theobald Walter, who had been appointed chief butler of Ireland by King Henry II in 1177.

Thomas's mother was the eldest daughter of Edmund Butler, 2nd Viscount Mountgarret and his wife Grizel FitzPatrick. Thomas was one of eleven siblings, two brothers and nine sisters, who are listed in his father's article, but he was the only surviving son.

== Marriage and children ==
Probably in 1608, but surely before 1610, Butler married Elizabeth Poyntz against his father's wishes. She was the second daughter of Sir John Poyntz (died 1633) of Iron Acton, Gloucestershire, and his second wife Elizabeth Sydenham (died 1595). His wife's family were English Catholics. (Note: Thurles, like his father was a staunch catholic and would have never married a protestant. Her paternal grandfather, Nicholas Poyntz, quite surely was a Catholic.)

Thomas and Elizabeth had three sons:

1. James (1610–1688), became the 1st Duke of Ormond
2. John (died 1636), died unmarried in Naples on his travels
3. Richard (1615–1701) of Kilcash

—and four daughters: (Note: Bernard Burke lists the daughters as: Helena (married MacCarty), Ellen (married Aylmer), Mary (married Hamilton), and Elizabeth (married Purcell). Lodge lists them as Ellen (married MacCarty), Elizabeth (married Purcell), Mary (married Hamilton), and Eleanor (married Aylmer).)

1. Helena or Ellen or Eleanor (1612–1682), before 1633 married Donough MacCarty, 1st Earl of Clancarty (Note: Their eldest son, Charles (or Cormac), was born between 4 June 1633 and 3 June 1634 as he died on 3 June 1635, aged 31.)
2. Eleanor or Ellen, in 1634 married Sir Andrew Aylmer (1613–1671), baronet, of Donadea in the County of Kildare
3. Mary (died 1680), in 1635 married Sir George Hamilton, 1st Baronet, of Donalong
4. Elizabeth (died 1675), married first James Purcell (1609–1652), Baron of Loughmoe, by whom she had Nicholas Purcell of Loughmoe (1651–1722); she married secondly John FitzPatrick of Castletown (Note: Elizabeth was, however, not the mother of Richard FitzPatrick, 1st Baron Gowran, who was a son or grandson of Andrew Fitzpatrick of castle Fleming.)

== Viscount Thurles ==
When Black Tom died on 22 November 1614, Butler's father succeeded as the 11th earl and Butler became heir apparent with the courtesy title of Viscount Thurles. While the Ormond title was secure, the lands were claimed by Richard Preston, 1st Earl of Desmond, who had married Elizabeth, Black Tom's only surviving child.

== Death and succession ==
In 1619 after the beginning of his father's long imprisonment in the Fleet Prison in London, Thurles was summoned to England to answer charges of treason, specifically, of having garrisoned Kilkenny. However, on 15 December the ship conveying him was wrecked off the Skerries, Isle of Anglesey, and he drowned. Like his father, Thurles was a prominent Catholic and it seems likely that his refusal to conform to the established Anglican religion had angered King James I and may have been the true motive for his summons.

Thurles predeceased his father, who would die in 1634. His eldest son James, the future 1st Duke of Ormond, became heir apparent and bearer of the courtesy title Viscount Thurles until he succeeded his grandfather as the 12th Earl of Ormond. Thurles's widow survived him for more than 50 years.

== Notes and references ==
=== Sources ===
- Burke, Bernard (1866). A Genealogical History of the Dormant, Abeyant, Forfeited and Extinct Peerages of the British Empire (New ed.). London: Harrison. OCLC 11501348. – (for FitzPatrick)
- Burke, Bernard; Burke, Ashworth Peter (1915). A Genealogical and Heraldic History of the Peerage and Baronetage, the Privy Council, Knightage and Companionage (77th ed.). London: Harrison. OCLC 1155471554. – (for Ormond)
- Carte, Thomas (1851) [1st pub. 1736]. The Life of James Duke of Ormond. Vol. I (New ed.). Oxford: Oxford University Press. OCLC 1086656347. – 1613 to 1641
- Debrett, John (1828). Peerage of the United Kingdom of Great Britain and Ireland. Vol. II (17th ed.). London: F. C. and J. Rivington. OCLC 54499602. – Scotland and Ireland
- Dunboyne (1968). Butler Family History (2nd ed.). Kilkenny: Rothe House.
- Edwards, David (2004). "Butler, Thomas, tenth earl of Ormond and third earl of Ossory (1531–1558)". In Matthew, Henry Colin Gray; Harrison, Brian (eds.). Oxford Dictionary of National Biography. Vol. 9. New York: Oxford University Press. pp. 220–225. ISBN 0-19-861359-8.
- G. E. C. (1895). Complete Peerage of England, Scotland, Ireland, Great Britain and the United Kingdom, Extant, Extinct, or Dormant. Vol. VI (1st ed.). London: George Bell and Sons. OCLC 1180818801. – N to R (for Ormond)
- G. E. C. (1900). Complete Baronetage, 1611 to 1800. Vol. I (1st ed.). Exeter: William Pollard & Co. OCLC 866278985. – 1611 to 1625
- G. E. C. (1913). Gibbs, Vicary (ed.). The Complete Peerage of England, Scotland, Ireland, Great Britain and the United Kingdom, Extant, Extinct, or Dormant. Vol. III (2nd ed.). London: The St Catherine Press. OCLC 228661424. – Canonteign to Cutts (for Clancarty)
- Hasler, P. W., ed. (1981). The House of Commons 1558–1603. Vol. II. London: His/Her Majesty's Stationery Office. ISBN 0-11-887501-9. – M to Z
- Lainé, P. Louis (1836). "Mac-Carthy". Archives généalogiques et historiques de la noblesse de France [Genealogical and Historical Archives of the Nobility of France] (in French). Vol. Tome cinquième. Paris: Imprimerie de Bethune et Plon. pp. 1–102. OCLC 865941166.
- Lodge, John (1789). Archdall, Mervyn (ed.). The Peerage of Ireland or, A Genealogical History of the Present Nobility of that Kingdom. Vol. IV. Dublin: James Moore. OCLC 264906028. – Viscounts (for Butler, Viscount Mountgarrett)
- Manning, Conleth (2001). "The Two Sir George Hamiltons and their Connections with the Castles of Roscrea and Nenagh" (PDF). Tipperary Historical Journal: 149–154.
- Rigg, James McMullen (2004). "Fitzpatrick, Richard, 1st Baron Gowran (c. 1662–1727)". In Matthew, Colin; Harrison, Brian (eds.). Oxford Dictionary of National Biography. Vol. 19. New York: Oxford University Press. p. 915. ISBN 0-19-861369-5.
