= Walter Butler, 16th Earl of Ormonde =

Irish earl (1703–1783)

Walter Butler (1703–1783), also known as Walter Butler of Kilcash, and Walter Butler of Garryricken, was the de jure 16th Earl of Ormond and 9th Earl of Ossory. He did not assume these titles, as he thought them forfeit as a result of the attainder of the 2nd Duke of Ormonde. In the peerage of Ireland, the titles were successfully claimed in 1791 by his son John, the 17th Earl.

== Birth and origins ==
Walter was born on 10 June 1703, probably at Garryricken House, the only son of John Butler and his wife Frances Butler. His father was the younger brother of Thomas Butler of Garryricken and part of a cadet branch of the Butler dynasty that started with Richard Butler of Kilcash (died 1701), a younger brother of the 1st Duke of Ormond. Walter's mother was a daughter of George Butler of Ballyragget, who belonged to another branch of the same wide-branched family. The Butler Dynasty is Old English and descends from Theobald Walter, who had been appointed Chief Butler of Ireland by King Henry II in 1177.

Family tree

Walter Butler with wife, parents, and other selected relatives. (Note: This family tree is partly derived from the condensed Butler family tree pictured in Dunboyne. Also see the list of children in the text.)

Richard of Kilcash; 1615–1701	Frances; Tuchet
Walter of Garryricken d. 1700	Mary; Plunkett
Thomas of Garryricken d. 1738; Colonel	Margaret; Magennis; 1673–1744	John; Butler	Frances; Butler
John de jure 15th Earl d. 1766	Walter de jure 16th Earl; 1703–1783	Ellen; Morres d. 1794
John; 17th Earl; 1740–1795	Anne; Wandesford; 1754–1830
Walter; 1st Marquess; 1770–1820	Ann; Clarke	James; 1st Marquess; 1777–1838	Louisa; Staples

Legend

XXX	Subject of the article	XXX	Earls and marquesses of Ormond

== Marriage and children ==
On 19 December 1732 he married Ellen (Eleanor) Morres, the eldest daughter of Nicholas Morres of the Court, County Dublin, granddaughter of Sir John Morres, 7th Baronet Morres of Knockagh.

By his wife he had a son and three daughters:

1. Frances, married Morgan Kavanagh, of Ballyhale, County Kilkenny
2. Susanna (born 1733) married Thomas Kavanagh, The MacMorrough in 1755;
3. Eleanor Charlotte (1739–1829) was the elder of the two Ladies of Llangollen
4. John (1740–1795) became the 17th Earl of Ormonde

== Inheritances and succession ==
He inherited his father's estate at an unknown time near the middle of the century and was then known as Walter Butler of Garryricken, a member of the landed gentry.

In 1766, his cousin John Butler of Kilcash, the de jure 15th Earl of Ormonde, died without an heir. As a result, Walter Butler inherited the Ormond estate that his cousin had in turn inherited from Charles Butler, 1st Earl of Arran along with the lands that his cousin had inherited from Thomas Butler of Garryricken, his father. In consequence, the two halves of the lands of the Garryricken Manor were reunited in Walter's hand. It had been divided between his father and his uncle Thomas at the death of Richard Butler of Kilcash in 1701.

Unknowingly, Walter Butler also inherited his cousin's title and became de jure the 16th Earl of Ormond. (Note: Burke numbers him as the 16th Earl, but Cokayne numbers him as the 17th.)

== Kilkenny Castle ==
Having inherited the estates, Walter decided to move into Kilkenny Castle, which was in a dilapidated state. In 1769, his son John married the heiress Anne Wandesford of Castlecomer. Walter and John spent much of her dowry on improving the castle. They re-routed the old approach road away from the castle, built a new road, and then landscaped and planted the Castle Park and the road much as it is today. They built the beautiful stables and courtyards across this road and finally, Walter moved to his newly built dower house, Butler House beyond those stables.

== Death and succession ==
Walter Butler died in Kilkenny Castle in 1783. After his father's death, his son reclaimed the title of "Earl of Ormonde". This was confirmed in 1791. The Butlers rapidly re-established their position and prestige. They always owned large areas of land in counties Kilkenny and Tipperary, and now became the largest landowners in the southeast of Ireland.

Timeline
Age	Date	Event
0	1703, 10 Jun	Born, probably at Garryricken House.
29	1732, 19 Dec	Married Ellen (Eleanor) Morres.
63	1766, 24 Jun	Inherited his cousin's estate and unknowingly became de jure the 16th Earl of Ormond.
65	1769, Feb	Son married the heiress Anne Wandesford.
79	1783, 2 Jun	Died at Kilkenny Castle

== Ancestry ==
- Walter Butler, 11th Earl of Ormond

- Thomas Butler, Viscount Thurles, the eldest son of the 11th Earl, who predeceased his father.

- James Butler, 1st Duke of Ormonde, the eldest son of Viscount Thurles.

- Thomas Butler, 6th Earl of Ossory, the eldest son of the 1st Duke who predeceased his father.

- James Butler, 2nd Duke of Ormonde, grandson of the 1st Duke.
- Charles Butler, 1st Earl of Arran, grandson of the 1st Duke, brother of the 2nd Duke.

- Richard Butler of Kilcash, the youngest son of Viscount Thurles, brother of the 1st Duke.

- Walter Butler of Garryricken, the eldest son of Richard, great-grandson of the 11 Earl. Garryricken is a townland in the barony of Kells, County Kilkenny.

- Colonel Thomas Butler of Garryricken, the eldest son of Walter.

- John Butler, 15th Earl of Ormonde, son of Colonel Thomas, great-grand-nephew of the 1st Duke.

- John Butler of Garryricken, second son of Walter and brother of Colonel Thomas, grand-nephew of the 1st Duke.

- Walter Butler, 16th Earl of Ormonde, son of John, great-great-great-grandson of the 11th Earl and the first cousin of the 15th Earl.

== Notes and references ==
=== Sources ===
- Burke, Bernard; Burke, Ashworth Peter (1915). A Genealogical and Heraldic History of the Peerage and Baronetage, the Privy Council, Knightage and Companionage (77th ed.). London: Harrison. OCLC 1155471554.
- Carrigan, Rev William (1905). The History and Antiquities of the Diocese of Ossory. Vol. IV. Dublin: Sealy Bryers & Walker. OCLC 29384778.
- Cokayne, George Edward (1895). Complete Peerage of England, Scotland, Ireland, Great Britain and the United Kingdom, Extant, Extinct, or Dormant. Vol. VI (1st ed.). London: George Bell and Sons. OCLC 1180818801. – N to R (for Ormonde)
- Debrett, John (1828). Peerage of the United Kingdom of Great Britain and Ireland. Vol. II (17th ed.). London: F. C. and J. Rivington. OCLC 54499602. – Scotland and Ireland (for his son's marriage)
- Dunboyne, Patrick Theobald Tower Butler, Baron (1968). Butler Family History (2nd ed.). Kilkenny: Rothe House.
- Mavor, Elizabeth (2004). "Butler, Lady (Charlotte) Eleanor (1739–1829)". In Matthew, Henry Colin Gray.; Harrison, Brian (eds.). Oxford Dictionary of National Biography. Vol. 9. New York: Oxford University Press. pp. 129–130. ISBN 0-19-861359-8.

Peerage of Ireland
Preceded by John Butler	Earl of Ormond; Earl of Ossory; 1766–1783	Succeeded by John Butler
