= Butler House, Kilkenny =

Georgian Dower house located in Kilkenny

Coordinates: 52.648760°N 07.250895°W

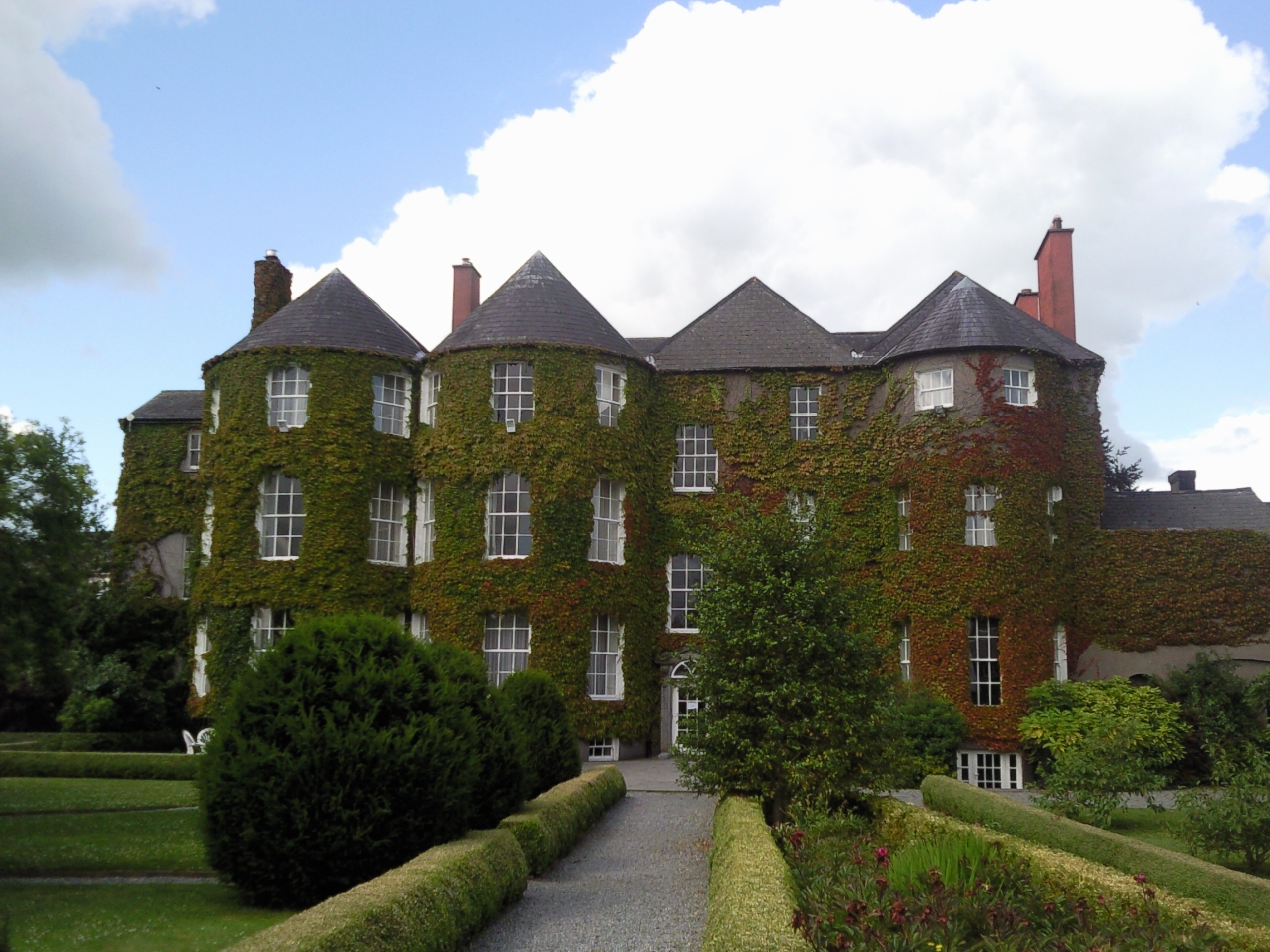
- Interactive map of the Butler House, Kilkenny area

General information
- Type: Dower house
- Architectural style: Georgian
- Location: Ireland
- Completed: 1798

Butler House is an 18th-century Georgian Dower house located in Kilkenny, Ireland. It is currently being used as a 4-star hotel and conference centre.

== History ==
Butler House was built so that it was completed by 1786 as the Dower house for Kilkenny Castle. It was built for the 16th Earl of Ormonde for his wife to live in when their son, the future 17th Earl of Ormonde, inherited the title. The first occupant was Lady Eleanor Butler, though it isn't certain if she and her husband moved in before his death. Her daughter Eleanor was one of the Ladies of Llangollen.

The 1st Marquess of Ormonde (who was also the 19th Earl of Ormonde) lived in the house while he was doing significant reconstruction work on the Castle in 1831. A local cholera epidemic in 1832 meant that the family used the house as the site of a soup kitchen. The house was substantially extended about this time as well.

The Royal Historical and Archaeological Association of Ireland, now the Royal Society of Antiquaries of Ireland (RSAI), was formed in the house in the 1870s.

The house was refurbished in the 1970s by the Kilkenny Design Workshops which had taken over the Castle yard and house in 1965. In 1989 the house was opened as a hotel and conference centre and is owned and managed by the Kilkenny Civic Trust. The gardens were restored to their previous glory in 2000.

== Architecture ==
It is a classic Georgian three-bay three-storey over basement house with a pair of three full-height bowed bays to the east side of the house facing into the walled garden which backs onto the Castle Yard and stables to Kilkenny Castle. The hotel retained many of the historic characteristics including the well-preserved rooms.
