= Elizabeth, Lady Thurles =

Mother of the 1st Duke of Ormond (1587–1673)

Elizabeth Butler née Poyntz
- Viscountess Thurles (courtesy title)
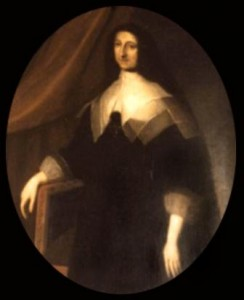
- Born: 1587; Iron Acton, Gloucestershire, England
- Died: May 1673 (aged 85–86); Thurles, County Tipperary, Ireland
- Spouse: Thomas Butler, Viscount Thurles
- Issue Detail: James, Richard, & others
- Father: John Poyntz (died 1633)
- Mother: Elizabeth Sydenham (died 1595)

Elizabeth Poyntz (1587–1673), known as Lady Thurles, was the mother of the Irish statesman and Royalist commander James Butler, 1st Duke of Ormonde.

== Birth and origins ==
Elizabeth was born in 1587 at Iron Acton, Gloucestershire, England, the second daughter of Sir John Pointz and his second wife Elizabeth Sydenham. Her father was probably knighted in 1588, and surely before 1593. He was lord of the manor of Iron Acton. He died in 1633, apparently intestate and insolvent.

Elizabeth's mother was a daughter of Alexander Sydenham of Luxborough, Somerset. She died in childbed in 1595.

Family tree

Elizabeth Butler, Lady Thurles, with husband, parents, and other selected
relatives. (Note: This family tree is partly derived from the condensed Butler family tree pictured in Dunboyne. Also see the lists of children in the text.)

John of Kilcash d. 1570 | Katherine; MacCarthy | Nicholas; Poyntz d. 1585
Walter; 11th Earl; 1559 – 1633 'Beads' | Helen; Butler d. 1631 | John Pointz d. 1633 | Elizabeth; Sydenham (d. 1595)
Thomas; Viscount; Thurles d. 1619 d.v.p.* | Elizabeth; Pointz; 1587–1673 | George; Mathew d. 1636
James; 1st Duke; 1610–1688 | Elizabeth; Preston; 1615–1684 | Theobald d. 1699 | Margaret
Thomas; 6th Earl; Ossory; 1633–1680 d.v.p.* | Emilia von Nassau; 1635–1688

Legend

| XXX | Thomas; Butler | XXX | Earls & dukes of Ormond |

*d.v.p. = predeceased his father (decessit vita patris)

== First marriage and children ==
In 1608, Elizabeth married Thomas Butler, son of Walter Butler. At the time her father-in-law was a nephew of the ruling earl, Black Tom, the 10th earl of Ormond. Apparently, the marriage was against her father-in-law's wishes.

Thomas and Elizabeth had three sons:

1. James (1610–1688), became the 1st Duke of Ormond
2. John (died 1636), died unmarried in Naples on his travels
3. Richard (1615–1701) of Kilcash

—and four daughters: (Note: Bernard Burke lists the daughters as: Helena (married MacCarty), Ellen (married Aylmer), Mary (married Hamilton), and Elizabeth (married Purcell). Lodge lists them as Ellen (married MacCarty), Elizabeth (married Purcell), Mary (married Hamilton), and Eleanor (married Aylmer).)

1. Helena or Ellen or Eleanor (1612–1682), married Donough MacCarty, 1st Earl of Clancarty before 1633 (Note: Their eldest son, Charles (or Cormac), was born between 4 June 1633 and 3 June 1634 as he died on 3 June 1635, aged 31.)
2. Eleanor or Ellen, married Sir Andrew Aylmer (1613–1671), 2nd baronet, of Donadea in the County of Kildare in 1634
3. Mary (died 1680), married Sir George Hamilton, 1st Baronet, of Donalong in 1635
4. Elizabeth (d. 1675), married first James Purcell, Baron Loughmoe (1609–1652), by whom she had Nicholas Purcell of Loughmoe (1651–1722); she married secondly John FitzPatrick of Castletown (Note: Elizabeth was, however, not the mother of Richard FitzPatrick, 1st Baron Gowran, who was a son or grandson of Andrew Fitzpatrick of Castle Fleming.)

== Lady Thurles ==
When Black Tom died in November 1614, Walter, her father-in-law, succeeded as the 11th earl, and her husband became heir apparent with the courtesy title of Viscount Thurles. She therefore became Lady Thurles.

While the Ormond title was secure, the lands were claimed by Richard Preston, 1st Earl of Desmond, who had married Elizabeth, Black Tom's only surviving child in autumn 1614, shortly before her father's death. The 11th Earl contested Preston's claim, but the king intervened and decided in Preston's favour. As Walter refused to accept, the king arrested him and held him in London's Fleet Prison.

Some sources say that Lady Thurles lived in Thurles Castle from her first marriage until her death (1608–1673), except for a short period (1658–1660) during the rule of Cromwell—she was a Catholic Royalist. It is not clear, however, how she could have returned to Thurles Castle because Lewis writes that "this castle, during the parliamentary war, was garrisoned for the King, but was afterwards taken by the parliamentarian forces, by whom it was demolished". On the other hand, Lady Thurles may have returned to a newer building on or close to the site of the castle which may also have been called Thurles Castle; Grose, writing in 1791, and Armitage, writing in 1912, seem to imply that a building called Thurles Castle still existed in their times.

Lord Thurles drowned on 15 December 1619, when the ship that should have carried him to England was wrecked off the Skerries near Anglesey. Thomas had been on his way to answer charges of treason for having garrisoned Kilkenny. Her son James, aged 9, became the new heir apparent and therefore was styled Viscount Thurles. In principle, she became now dowager Lady Thurles, but was still called Lady Thurles for short.

== Second marriage and children ==
In 1620 Lady Thurles married Captain George Mathew of Radyr and Llandaff in Glamorganshire, Wales. He was a Catholic. With George Elizabeth had two sons:

1. Theobald (d. 1699), was granted the manor of Thurles by his half-brother James
2. George (Note: George had a daughter, Frances Mary Mathew, who, in 1723, married John Ryan, a member of one of the few remaining landed Catholic families in County Tipperary at the time, and lived with him at Inch House in the townland of Inch.)

—and one daughter:

1. Frances

In 1629 her son James, styled Lord Thurles, married Elizabeth. There were now two persons called "Elizabeth, Lady Thurles", the actual one and the dowager one. When Walter, the father-in-law of dowager Lady Thurles, died in 1633, James succeeded as the 12th Earl of Ormond and his wife became Countess of Ormond. The name "Thurles" was now unique again and could only mean the dowager Lady Thurles.

In 1636 Thurles's second husband died at Tenby, Pembrokeshire, Wales. She would outlive him by 37 years.

== Late life, death, and Timeline ==
In May 1646 Ormond feared for Thurles's safety and had her brought to Dublin. Similar rescues were organised for Thurles's daughters, Lady Hamilton, Lady Muskerry, and Lady Loughmoe.

In 1656, during the Protectorate, Thurles was left in the possession of the manor of Thurles and excepted from transplantation as a result of a petition by Hardress Waller and other army officers.

Lady Thurles died in Thurles in May 1673. She was buried in Thurles beside what is now the Protestant church of St. Mary's.

Timeline
Italics for historical background.
| Age | Date | Event |
| 0 | 1587 | Born |
| 15–16 | 24 Mar 1603 | Accession of James I, succeeding Elizabeth I |
| 20–21 | 1608 | Married 1st husband, Thomas Butler, Viscount Thurles |
| 22–23 | 1610 | Son James born |
| 26–27 | 22 Nov 1614 | Styled Viscountess Thurles as Thomas, the 10th earl, died |
| 29–30 | 1617 | Walter, her father-in-law, detained in Fleet Prison |
| 31–32 | 15 Dec 1619 | 1st husband died. |
| 37–38 | 18 Mar 1625 | Walter, her father-in-law, submitted to James I's decision. |
| 37–38 | 27 Mar 1625 | Accession of Charles I, succeeding James I |
| 41–42 | 125 Dec 1629 | Son James married Elizabeth Preston. |
| 45–46 | 24 Feb 1633 | Father-in-law died at Carrick-on-Suir. |
| 48–49 | Oct 1636 | 2nd husband died. |
| 53–54 | 23 Oct 1641 | Outbreak of the Rebellion |
| 72–73 | 29 May 1660 | Restoration of Charles II |
| 85–86 | 1673 | Died |

== Notes and references ==
=== Sources ===
- Brennan, Monica A. (1974). James Butler and the Royalist cause in Ireland, 1641-1650 (MA). Portland, Oregon: Portland State University.
- Burke, Bernard (1866). A Genealogical History of the Dormant, Abeyant, Forfeited and Extinct Peerages of the British Empire (New ed.). London: Harrison. OCLC 11501348. – (for FitzPatrick)
- Burke, Sir Bernard (1879). A Genealogical and Heraldic History of the Landed Gentry of Great Britain and Ireland. Vol. II (6th ed.). London: Harrison. OCLC 972909415. – L to Z (for George Mathew)
- Burke, Bernard; Burke, Ashworth Peter (1915). A Genealogical and Heraldic History of the Peerage and Baronetage, the Privy Council, Knightage and Companionage (77th ed.). London: Harrison. OCLC 1155471554. – (for Ormond)
- Cokayne, George Edward (1895). Complete Peerage of England, Scotland, Ireland, Great Britain and the United Kingdom, Extant, Extinct, or Dormant. Vol. VI (1st ed.). London: George Bell and Sons. OCLC 1180818801. – N to R
- Cokayne, George Edward (1900). Complete Baronetage, 1611 to 1800. Vol. I (1st ed.). Exeter: William Pollard & Co. OCLC 866278985. – 1611 to 1625
- Cokayne, George Edward (1913). Gibbs, Vicary (ed.). The complete peerage of England, Scotland, Ireland, Great Britain and the United Kingdom, extant, extinct, or dormant. Vol. III (2nd ed.). London: St Catherine Press. OCLC 228661424. – Canonteign to Cutts (for Clancarty)
- Cokayne, George Edward (1945). Doubleday, H. A. (ed.). The complete peerage or a History of the House of Lords and all its Members from the Earliest Times. Vol. X (2nd ed.). London: The St Catherine Press. ISBN 978-0-904387-82-7. OCLC 228661424. – Oakham to Richmond (snippet view) (for Ormond)
- Edwards, David (2004). "Butler, Walter, eleventh earl of Ormond and fourth Earl of Ossory (1559–1633)". In Matthew, Henry Colin Gray; Harrison, Brian (eds.). Oxford Dictionary of National Biography. Vol. 9. New York: Oxford University Press. pp. 230–231. ISBN 0-19-861359-8.
- Fryde, Edmund Boleslaw; Greenway, D. E.; Porter, S.; Roy, I., eds. (1986). Handbook of British Chronology. Royal Historical Society Guides and Handbooks, No. 2 (3rd ed.). London: Offices of the Royal Historical Society. ISBN 0-86193-106-8. – (for timeline)
- Graves, James (1863). "Anonymous Account of the Early Life and Marriage of James, First Duke of Ormond". The Journal of the Kilkenny and South-East of Ireland Archaeological Society. New. 4 (2): 276–292. JSTOR 25502636.
- Lainé, P. Louis (1836). "Mac-Carthy". Archives généalogiques et historiques de la noblesse de France [Genealogical and Historical Archives of the Nobility of France] (in French). Vol. Tome cinquième. Paris: Imprimerie de Bethune et Plon. pp. 1–102. OCLC 865941166.
- Lodge, John (1789). Archdall, Mervyn (ed.). The Peerage of Ireland or, A Genealogical History of the Present Nobility of that Kingdom. Vol. IV. Dublin: James Moore. OCLC 264906028. – Viscounts (for Butler, Viscount Mountgarrett)
- MacLean, John (1886). Historical and genealogical memoir of the family of Poyntz. Vol. Part I. Exeter: Private printed by William Pollard. OCLC 902853377.
- Manning, Conleth (2001). "The Two Sir George Hamiltons and their Connections with the Castles of Roscrea and Nenagh" (PDF). Tipperary Historical Journal: 149–154.
- Mathew, David, archbishop (1959). "Mathew family". Dictionary of Welsh Biography.
- Rigg, James McMullen (2004). "Fitzpatrick, Richard, 1st Baron Gowran (c. 1662–1727)". In Matthew, Colin; Harrison, Brian (eds.). Oxford Dictionary of National Biography. Vol. 19. New York: Oxford University Press. p. 915. ISBN 0-19-861369-5.
- Shaw, William Arthur (1906). The Knights of England: A complete record from the earliest time to the present day of the knights of all the orders of chivalry in England, Scotland, and Ireland, and of knights bachelors, incorporating a complete list of knights bachelors dubbed in Ireland. Vol. II. London: Sherratt & Hughes. – Knights bachelors & Index
- Warner, Ferdinand (1768). History of the Rebellion and Civil-War in Ireland. Vol. I. Dublin: James William. OCLC 82770539. – 1641 to 1643
- Williams, W. R. (1898). The Parliamentary History of the County of Gloucestershire. Hereford: Printed privately by Jakeman & Carver. OCLC 919917160.
