= Bryan Magennis, 5th Viscount Magennis of Iveagh =

Bryan Magennis, 5th Viscount Iveagh (c. 1655 – September 1692) was an Irish Jacobite peer and soldier.

Magennis was the son of Hugh Magennis, 4th Viscount Iveagh and Rose O'Neill, and in 1684 he succeeded to his father's peerage. He was a supporter of James II of England following the Glorious Revolution, and in 1689 he raised two regiments in support of the Jacobite cause – one of dragoons and one of infantry. In May 1689 he was summoned to the Irish House of Lords in the brief Patriot Parliament called by James II. He was also appointed Lord Lieutenant of Down. Magennis served as colonel of his regiment of foot during the Siege of Limerick. He was attainted in 1691.

Upon the conclusion of the Williamite War in Ireland, Magennis was commissioned in March 1692 to raise a regiment of five of companies of Irish Catholics, each of 100 soldiers, to serve in the army of Leopold I, Holy Roman Emperor. Magennis and his regiment left Cork on 31 May 1692 for Hamburg. From Hamburg, they were sent to fight in Hungary against the Turks, but almost all, including Magennis, had died of disease by the end of 1692.

Magennis had married Margaret Burke in 1689. The marriage was likely childless.

Peerage of Ireland
Preceded by Hugh Magennis	Viscount Magennis of Iveagh; 1684–1691	Forfeit
