= Inch, Inch =

Inch An Inse
- Townland
- Location in Ireland
- Coordinates: 52.72100°N 7.92210°W
- Country: Ireland
- Province: Munster
- County: County Tipperary

Inch (Irish: An Inse) is a townland of a little over 199 acres in the civil parish of the same name, in the barony of Eliogarty, County Tipperary, Ireland.

== Inch House ==
At the time of the first Ordnance Survey, most of the townland was occupied by the parkland for Inch House.

The house was built in 1720 by John Ryan, a member of one of the few remaining landed Catholic families in County Tipperary at the time. His descendants lived there until the house was sold to the present owners, who run it as a country house and restaurant, in 1985. In 1723, John Ryan married Frances Mary Mathew, a grand-daughter of Elizabeth, Lady Thurles, and a half-first-cousin of James Butler, 1st Duke Of Ormonde.

According to the Irish Tourist Association Survey, the Ryan family came from Munroe to Inch. They were already present by the late 1600s. During the time of the anti-Catholic Penal Laws, their lands were held for them by Aneas Burke of Kilkenny. In 1783 George Ryan of Inch married Mary, daughter of Philip John Roche of Limerick, and they had four sons, one of whom, Daniel Ryan, occupied the house in 1814. When Daniel Ryan, still unmarried, died in 1831, he was succeeded by his brother George who was still resident in 1837. Another brother, Philip, also died unmarried in the early 1830s. The other brother, John Dennis, had married, in 1824, Anna Elizabeth Lenigan of Castle Fogerty (a short distance to the south of Inch) and their son, John Vivian Ryan, inherited that estate from his cousin, Penelope Elizabeth Marie Lenigan, taking the additional name of Lenigan in 1878.

At the time of Griffith's Valuation, the house was valued at £53 and held in fee by George Ryan. In the 1870s the representatives of George Ryan of Inch owned 1,694 acres in county Tipperary. In 1894, it was the residence of a George E. Ryan.
