= Battle of Cloughleagh =

1643 Irish Confederate Wars battle

Coordinates: 52.141°N 8.276°W

Battle of Cloghleagh
- Part of the Irish Confederate Wars
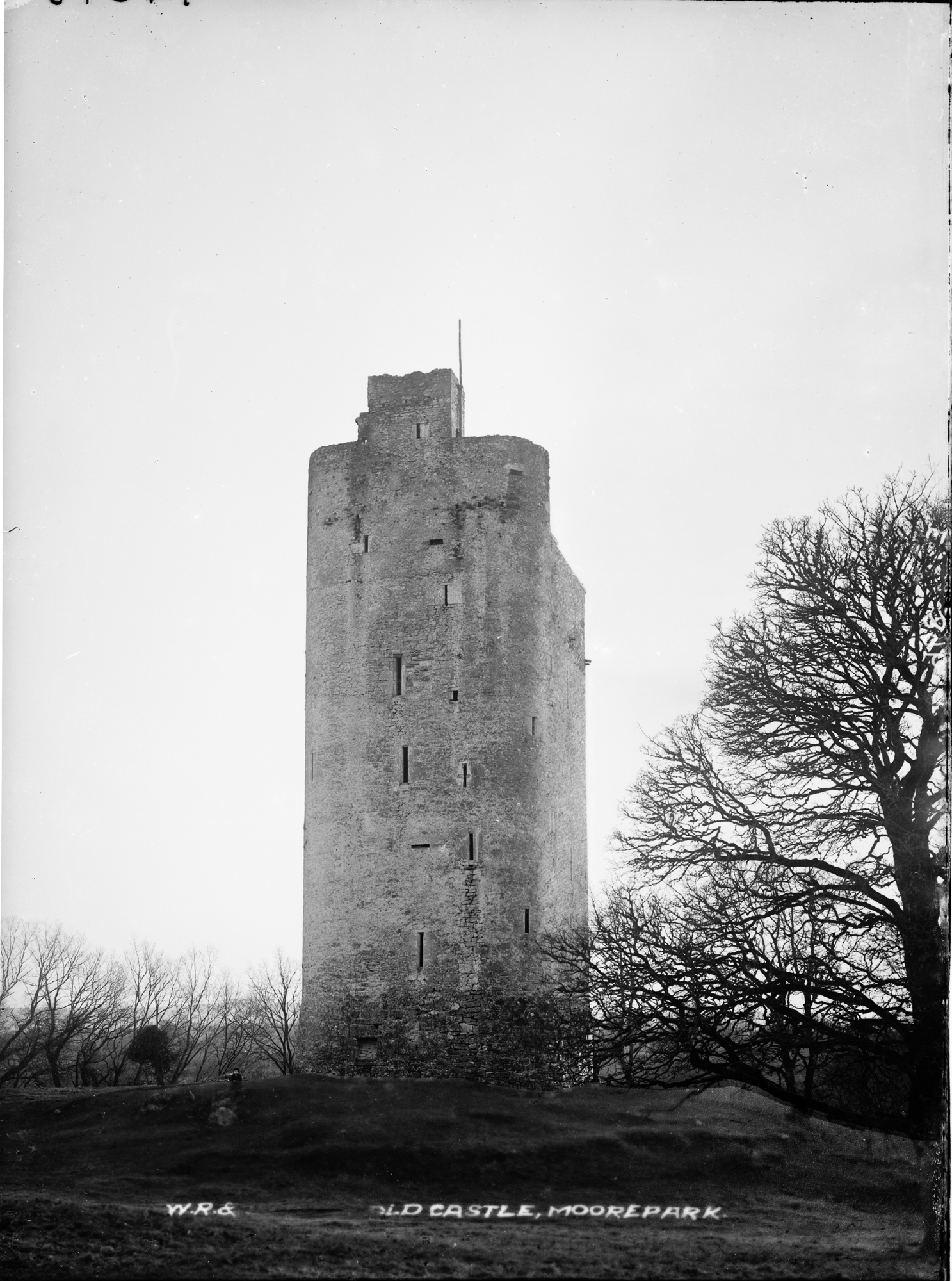
- Cloghleagh Castle
Date	4 June 1643
Location	Cloghleagh, near Fermoy, County Cork
Result	Confederate victory

Belligerents
Royalists	Irish Confederates

Commanders and leaders
Sir Charles Vavasour	Earl of Castlehaven; Viscount Muskerry

Strength
c. 1,700	c. 250

Casualties and losses
c. 600 dead	Low

Ireland and Fermoy

The Battle of Cloghleagh, also known as the Battle of Funcheon Ford or the Battle of Manning Water, was fought between a Royalist force and an Irish Confederate force during the Irish Confederate Wars. It took place south of Kilworth and north of Fermoy between the River Funshion and the River Blackwater in County Cork on 4 June 1643. The result was an Irish Confederate victory.

== Royalist Movements ==
At the beginning of May 1643, Murrough O'Brien (Baron Inchiquin), governor of Munster on behalf of King Charles I "drew his forces out of the garrisons, where they were on the point of starving."

He divided his forces into three parts in order to gather provisions by pillaging. One army under Lieutenant Colonel Story was sent into Kerry; Inchiquin himself went to besiege Kilmallock; while the 3rd army under the command of Sir Charles Vavasour "respectively gathered from the Garrisons of Youghall, Talloe, Castlelyons, Mogily and Cappaquin; the whole number consisting of about 1200 Musketeers, and 200 Horse, besides Volunteers and Pillagers" and marched into county Waterford.

This army marched as far as Dungarvan capturing and burning castles and houses and taking cattle. By 3 June they were back in county Cork and attacked the castle of Cloghleagh (also known as Kilworth Castle and as Condon Castle). Cloghleagh castle had been the ancestral home of the Condons who had retaken it in 1642 from forces placed there by the Earl of Barrymore. The Condon reinstatement was to be a short one as Vavasour's army arrived and "after a well regulated dispute (stoutly defended by the rebels)" took it back. The occupants, 20 men, 11 women, and 7 children, were stripped and massacred (against the wishes of Colonel Vavasour who had left the castle to attend a dinner invitation at the house of a Mr Roche in Castlelyons).

On the morning of 4 June, Captain Hill of the Royalist force was sent to scout into county Tipperary with a squadron of horse and encountered the enemy. Having escaped with great difficulty, Captain Hill returned to Cloghleagh pursued by a force of Confederate cavalry who stopped on a hill overlooking Cloghleagh. Sir Charles Vavasour was sent for and he came back to Cloghleagh as "fast as his horse would carry him".

After consulting with his officers, he decided that the appearance of the enemy cavalry meant that a larger enemy force was approaching and that the best course of action was to retreat southwards from Cloghleagh castle by crossing the river Funcheon and then crossing the river Blackwater at the ford of Fermoy and moving towards Castlelyons. The army was formed up to march with "the front led by lieutenant King, the body by major Howel and the rear by Sir Charles himself, a forlorn-hope of about 160 musketeers in the rear was commanded by Captain Pierce Lacy, Captain Hutton, and lieutenant Stardbury and all our horse in the rear likewise."

== Confederate Movements ==
James Tuchet (Earl of Castlehaven) was commanded by the assembly of Irish Confederates to march south from Kilkenny and confront the Royalist armies in Munster. He gathered about 80 horse in Kilkenny and placed them under the command of Garret Talbot to which he joined his own lifeguard of 40 horse which was commanded by Garret Garrough Fitzgerald and marched together with his "great friend" Donagh MacCarthy (Viscount Muskery) and on the frontiers of Munster linked with "120 horse more, most of them gentlemen".

At Cashel they met with General Barry, Lieutenant General Purcell and 700 foot. At Cashel they received intelligence that Inchiquin had abandoned the siege of Kilmallock and moved into Kerry but that Vavasour was at Cloghleagh with "16 or 1700 horse and foot" whereupon "I marched immediately towards him, and before night encamped within 3 miles of him".

Casltehaven’s brother in law, Richard Butler of Kilcash was sent out to scout and on the morning of 4 June he sent word that he was engaged with the enemy upon which Castlehaven "lost no time but marched with all haste with my horse………..The foot marched after, but the old general moved so slowly, that I had defeated the enemy before he came within two miles of the place".

== Battle ==
There is some confusion as to what exactly happened.

According to Castlehaven the Royalist army had got their cannon across the Blackwater, while they had drawn up their infantry on "a large plain." Castlehaven -

going by the advantage of a large valley came into the plain unseen...I lost no time in the charge, and quickly defeated his horse, who, to save themselves, broke in on the foot, and put them into disorder…This with God's blessing…gave me the victory, with little or no loss. Sir Charles that commanded, with several other officers, remained prisoners; their cannon and baggage taken, and all their foot defeated; but their horse, for the most part escaped.

According to Borlase the Royalists -

no sooner came over the Manning Water, and recovered the top of the Hill, but the enemies horse were at our heels; from the hill to the ford there is a dangerous passage of a narrow lane, which the enemy knew full well, and so did our men too. And the enemy perceiving that most of our men were marching within this lane, (excepting the forlorn hope and the horse), charged us in the rear, coming on us as the Moorish and Getulian horse, mentioned by Salust in Jugarth's war, not in order and in warlike manner, but by troops and scattering companies at adventure, that the fight rather resembled an incursion than a battle; and so hemmed in and pressed on our horse, (being but 120) that they were able to move no way, but fall into that lane amongst the foot, which they did, thereby routing our whole foot. The ordinance by this time was not carried over the Blackwater nor the two companies as yet come to make good the passage so that all our colours were taken, our two pieces of ordinance surprised and Sir Charles himself together with captain Wind, lieutenant King, ensign Chaplain, captain Fitzmorris, and divers others taken prisoner; besides those that were killed in the place captain Pierce Lacy, captain George Butler lieutenant Walter St. Leger…lieutenant Stradbury, lieutenant Rosington, lieutenant Kent, ensign Simmons, with divers other lieutenants and ensigns, besides common soldiers to the number of 300, some affirm 600.

According to Carte's account in A History of the Life of James Duke of Ormond -

Sir Charles…being attacked the next day in his march at Killworth by the Earl of Castlehaven and Lord Muskery. They had with them a body of 250 horse, and with these before their foot came up, they charged the English horse in a plain between Fermoy and Kilworth. Sir Charles had, among his troops, too many volunteers that came for the sake of plunder, and was besides inferior in the number of cavalry; so that his horse upon the very first attack fled, and broke in upon his foot, whereby the whole body was routed, 600 killed upon the spot, Sir Charles himself, with several other officers, made prisoners, his cannon, baggage and 700 arms taken. The loss fell chiefly upon the foot, the horse for the most part escaped.
