= Kilcash Castle =

Ruin of a 16th-century tower-house in Ireland

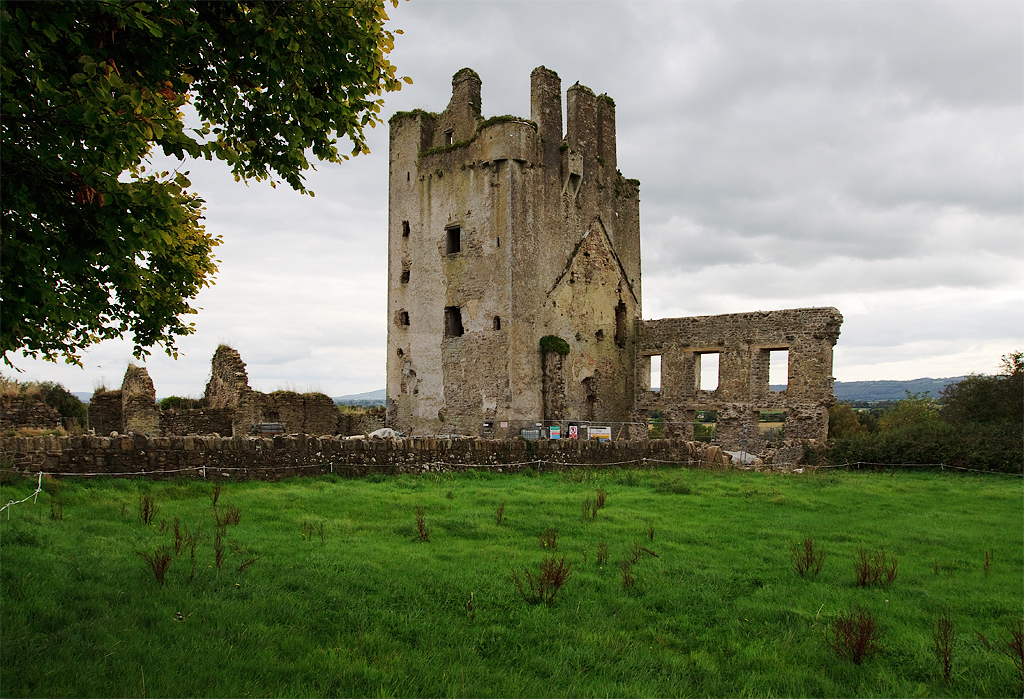
- Kilcash Castle ruin

- Location within Ireland
- 52°23′52″N 7°31′17″W
- Location: 5 miles (8 km) east of Clonmel, County Tipperary, Ireland

History
- Built: 16th century

Kilcash Castle is a ruined castle off the N24 road just west of Ballydine outside the village of Kilcash in County Tipperary, Ireland. It is in the care of the Irish State. The Butler dynasty has important links to the area.

== History ==
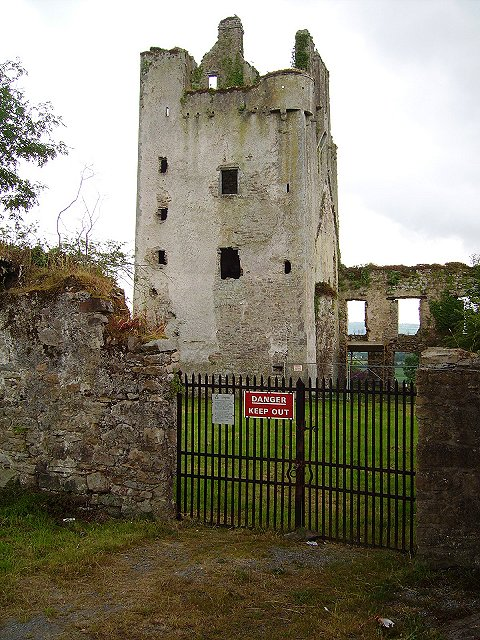
Castle tower

The main castle building is a fortified tower dating from the sixteenth-century. An adjoining hall was added at a later date, when the need for defence gave way to the large windows associated with settled times. In the sixteenth century the manor of Kilcash was taken from the Wall family after the Irish Confederate Wars and given to the Butlers of Ormond. The latter sold the castle to the Irish State in 1997 for £500.

In 1614, Walter, 11th Earl of Ormond, who lived at Kilcash, inherited the Ormond title from his uncle Thomas, 10th Earl of Ormond. The possession of the Ormond lands was disputed and Walter spent 1619-1625 in prison in London while James VI and I pressurised him to surrender most of his property. Walter passed the manor of Kilcash on to one of his grandsons, Colonel Richard Butler of Kilcash (d. 1701).

The 3rd Earl of Castlehaven, a noted Confederate Catholic commander in the 1641-52 wars, frequently stayed at Kilcash where his sister, Lady Frances, was married to Richard of Kilcash, another confederate commander. Lord Castlehaven wrote his memoirs there (published as The Earl of Castlehaven's Review).

In the 19th century, the castle fell into ruin after parts of the Kilcash Estate were sold c. 1800. During the Irish Civil War, the castle was occupied by Anti-Treaty forces in an attempt to slow the approach of Pro-Treaty forces towards Clonmel. They were finally dislodged by artillery fire under the command of Commandant-General John T. Prout, further damaging the already dilapidated structure.

By the late twentieth century, the castle was in a dangerous state of repair. Beginning in 2011, the castle underwent extensive repairs to prevent it from collapsing.

== Church ==
Near the castle are the remains of a medieval church consisting of a chancel and a nave with a Romanesque doorway in its south wall. This building was partially repaired in the 1980s and is now open to the public. In the graveyard, a Butler mausoleum (which is nearly as large as the church) contains the tombs of:

- Thomas Butler of Garryricken;
- Christopher Butler, Roman Catholic Archbishop of Cashel (1673–1757), a younger brother of Thomas Butler of Garryricken;
- Margaret Magennis, Viscountess Iveagh (1673–1744), widow of Bryan, 5th Viscount Magennis and Thomas Butler;
- Walter Butler, 16th Earl of Ormonde (died 1773); and
- John Butler, 17th Earl of Ormonde (died 1795).

Some of the eighteenth-century headstones are carved with elaborate scenes of the crucifixion.

== The lament for Kilcash ==
The castle is best known for the song "Kilcash" (Irish: Cill Chaise), which mourns the ruin of the castle and the death of Margaret Magennis, Viscountess Iveagh. The song has been ascribed to Fr John Lane (d. 1776), but the woods lamented in its first stanza were not sold until 1797 and 1801, long after Lane's death. The earliest manuscripts of the poem date from the mid-nineteenth century. Its first stanza reads:

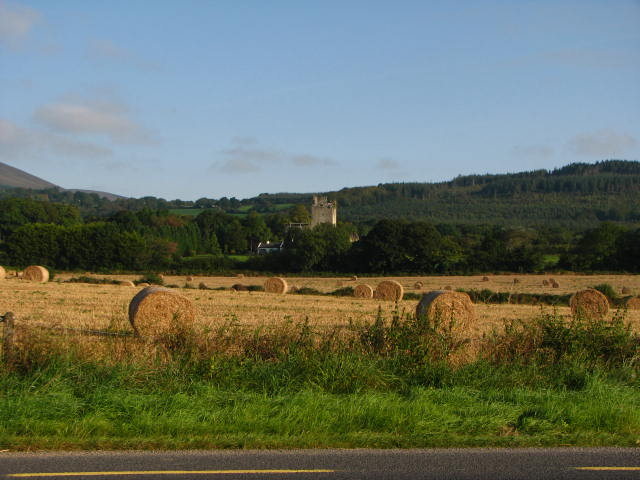
The castle from a distance

Cad a dhéanfaimid feasta gan adhmad?
Tá deireadh na gcoillte ar lár;
níl trácht ar Chill Chais ná ar a teaghlach
is ní chluinfear a cling go bráth.
An áit úd a gcónaíodh an deighbhean
fuair gradam is meidhir thar mhnáibh,
bhíodh iarlaí ag tarraingt tar toinn ann
is an t-aifreann binn á rá.

Now what will we do for timber,
With the last of the woods laid low?
There's no talk of Cill Chais or its household
And its bell will be struck no more.
That dwelling where lived the good lady
Most honoured and joyous of women
Earls made their way over wave there
And the sweet Mass once was said.

(translation by Eiléan Ní Chuilleanáin)
