= William Cuffe =

Irish politician

William Cuffe was an Irish politician.

Cuffe was educated at Trinity College, Dublin.

Cuffe represented Kilkenny City from 1735 to 1743.
