= Edmund Fryde =

British historian (1923–1999)

- Born: 16 July 1923; Warsaw, Poland
- Died: 17 November 1999 (aged 76); Aberystwyth, Cardiganshire, Wales
- Occupation: Professor

Academic background
- Education: University of Oxford
- Thesis: Edward III's war finance 1337-41: transactions in wool and credit operations (1947)
- Doctoral advisor: Goronwy Edwards

Academic work
- Discipline: Medieval history
- Sub-discipline: Economic history, Renaissance studies
- Institutions: University of Aberystwyth (1947–1990)

Edmund Bolesław Fryde, FBA (16 July 1923 – 17 November 1999) was a British historian of medieval England and the early Renaissance.

== Early life and education ==
Fryde was a son of Mieczysław (Matthew) Fryde, a prominent Polish-Jewish lawyer and economic historian, and Salomea Ludwika (Sarah Louise) Rosenzweig, both originally from Częstochowa. He grew up in Warsaw and came to the United Kingdom to study at Bradfield College in 1938. He took his undergraduate degree at Balliol College, University of Oxford (1942–4) and completed his doctoral thesis there in 1947.

== Career ==
Fryde was a Lecturer in Economic History, then a Professor at the University College of Wales, Aberystwyth from 1947 to 1990. Throughout his research career, he moved from the study of medieval economic history to intellectual history.

== Personal life ==
Fryde was married to Natalie Davies, his former student, from 1966 to 1981. He was a cousin of the novelist Uri Orlev.

== Books ==
- The Wool Accounts of William de la Pole: A Study of Some Aspects of the English Wool Trade at the Start of the Hundred Years (1964)
- Studies in Medieval Trade and Finance (1983)
- Humanism and Renaissance Historiography (1983)
- Peasants and Landlords in Later Medieval England c.1380–c.1525 (1996
- (ed. with D. E. Greenway, S. Porter, and I. Roy) Handbook of British Chronology (3rd ed.). Cambridge: Cambridge University Press. 2003. ISBN 9780521563505.
- The Early Palaeologan Renaissance (1261–c.1360) (2000)
