= Mervyn Archdall (Irish antiquary) =

Irish antiquary and clergyman

Personal details
- Born: 1723
- Died: 1791 (aged 67–68)
- Denomination: Anglican

Mervyn Archdall (1723–1791) was an Irish antiquary and clergyman of the Church of Ireland.

== Life ==
Archdall was descended from John Archdale, of Abbotts Hall, Darsham, in Suffolk, who settled at Castle Archdale, County Fermanagh as an Undertaker in the Plantation of Ulster. He was born in Dublin on 22 April 1723. After graduating from Trinity College, Dublin, his antiquarian tastes introduced him to the acquaintance of Walter Harris, Charles Smith the topographer, Thomas Prior, and Richard Pococke, archdeacon of Dublin. When Pococke became bishop of Ossory, he appointed Archdall his domestic chaplain, bestowed on him the living of Attanagh (partly in Queen's County and partly in County Kilkenny), and the prebend of Cloneamery in the cathedral church of Ossory (1762), which he afterwards exchanged (1764) for the prebend of Mayne in the same cathedral. Archdall was also chaplain to Francis Pierpoint, Lord Conyngham, and a member of the Royal Irish Academy. Having married his only daughter to a clergyman, he resigned part of his preferments in the diocese of Ossory to his son-in-law, and obtained the rectory of Slane in the diocese of Meath, where he died, 6 August 1791.

== Works ==
Archdall's major work is Monasticum Hibernicum; or, A History of the Abbeys, Priories, and other Religious houses in Ireland. (Dublin: printed for Luke White, 1786). Mistakes in it are rectified in John Lanigan's Ecclesiastical History of Ireland. Considerable portions of the work appear to have been contributed by Edward Ledwich. The publication of a new edition, entitled Monasticon Hibernicum, with notes by Patrick F. Moran and other antiquaries, began, in parts, at Dublin in 1871.

Archdall also produced an edition of John Lodge's Peerage of Ireland, 'revised, enlarged, and continued to the present time,' (7 vols. 1789).
