= John Lodge (archivist) =

English archivist and historian

John Lodge (1692–1774) was an English archivist and historian, best known for his work The Peerage of Ireland, a complete genealogical history of Irish peers.

== Life ==
Lodge was born into a farming family in Bolton-le-Sands, Lancashire, as the son of a husbandman-farmer, Edmund Lodge. He was educated at a school in Clapham, Yorkshire, under Mr. Ashe, and was admitted sub-sizar of St John's College, Cambridge on 26 June 1716. He graduated B.A. in 1719; was ordained a deacon at Lincoln in 1720 and as a priest at Ely in 1721; then became a schoolteacher at March, Cambridgeshire in 1725, and was awarded his M.A. in 1730. He went on to settle in Abbey Street, Dublin. In 1744, he published a Report of the Trial in Ejectment of Campbell Craig, from his own shorthand notes. In 1751 he was appointed deputy-keeper of the records in Bermingham Tower of Dublin Castle; in 1759 he became deputy-clerk and keeper of the rolls, and was subsequently deputy-registrar of the court of prerogative. He died at Bath, Somerset, on 22 February 1774.

== Family ==
He married, first, Miss Hamilton, who claimed kinship with the Abercorn family; and, secondly, Edwarda Galland. His son, William Lodge LL.D. (1742–1813), the only survivor of his nine children, became in 1790 chancellor of Armagh Cathedral, and was rector of Derrynoose and rector of Kilmore in the same diocese. Some of John Lodge's books, with marginal notes and corrections, came into the Armagh Library, which about 1867 acquired other John Lodge papers by purchase from a great-grandson.

== Works ==
Lodge's chief work, The Peerage of Ireland, comprises four volumes, and was published in 1754. His own interleaved copy, with numerous manuscript notes, is now in the British Library (Add MSS 23703-23708). A second edition, revised and enlarged to seven volumes by Mervyn Archdall, was published in 1789.

In 1770 Lodge published anonymously The Usage of Holding Parliaments and Preparing and Passing Bills of Supply in Ireland, stated from record, and in 1772, also without his name, a selection of state papers and historical tracts illustrating the political systems of the chief governors and government of Ireland during the reigns of Elizabeth, James I, and Charles I, which he called Desiderata curiosa Hibernica.

His collection of record indexes were deposited in 1783 in the office of the civil department of the chief secretary to the lord-lieutenant at Dublin in return for annuities of £100 a year to his widow and £200 a year to his son. These indexes were in constant request by Rowley Lascelles when engaged on his Liber Munerum Hiberniæ. At the sale of Sir William Betham's library a transcript of a portion of them fetched £155.

Lodge's other manuscripts in the British Library are:

- Pedigrees and notices of Irish families, ... with numerous additions by Sir W. Betham, Add MSS 23693-23702.
- Historical and genealogical notes relating to the English, Irish, and Scotch nobility, Add MS 23709.
- Collections for a Baronage of Ireland, ... with additions by Sir W. Betham, and an alphabetical index, Add MS 23710.
- Notes and additions to 'The whole works of Sir James Ware concerning Ireland', Egerton MSS 1783-1786.
