= John Debrett =

English publisher and compiler

John Debrett (8 January 1753 – 15 November 1822) was an English publisher and compiler. His name has become associated with reference books.

== Life ==
Debrett was of French Huguenot background and took over the business of John Almon, opposite Burlington House in Piccadilly, in 1781. His shop continued to be the resort of the whigs, the Pittites going chiefly to his neighbour, Stockdale.

Debrett retired from business about 1814, and lived partly upon a pension from his wife and partly from his compilations. He is described as a kindly, good-natured man, but without business aptitudes. He died at his lodgings in Upper Gloucester Street, Regent's Park, on 15 November 1822.

== Publications ==
Among Debrett's publications were a new edition of The New Foundling Hospital for Wit (1784), 6 vols., and Asylum for Fugitive Pieces in Prose and Verse (1785–1788), 4 vols. At the end of the former work, The New Peerage (1784), 3 vols., is advertised. This had been Almon's, who published peerages, but is not known to have had any share in their compilation. He is also known as the publisher of the first British printing of the United States Constitution in 1787.

The first edition of Debrett's Peerage of England, Scotland, and Ireland, containing an Account of all the Peers, 2 vols., was published in May 1802, with plates of arms, a second edition appeared in September 1802, a third in June 1803, a fourth in 1805, a fifth in 1806, a sixth in 1808, a seventh in 1809, an eighth in 1812, a ninth in 1814, a tenth in 1816, an eleventh in 1817, a twelfth in 1819, a thirteenth in 1820, a fourteenth in 1822, a fifteenth in 1823, which was the last edition edited by Debrett, and not published until after his death. The next edition came out in 1825. The first edition of The Baronetage of England, containing their Descent and Present State, by John Debrett, 2 vols., appeared in 1808. For a time the British Imperial Calendar was edited by Debrett.

== See also ==
- Debrett's
