= Bernard Burke =

British officer of arms and genealogist (1814–1892)

Sir Bernard Burke CB
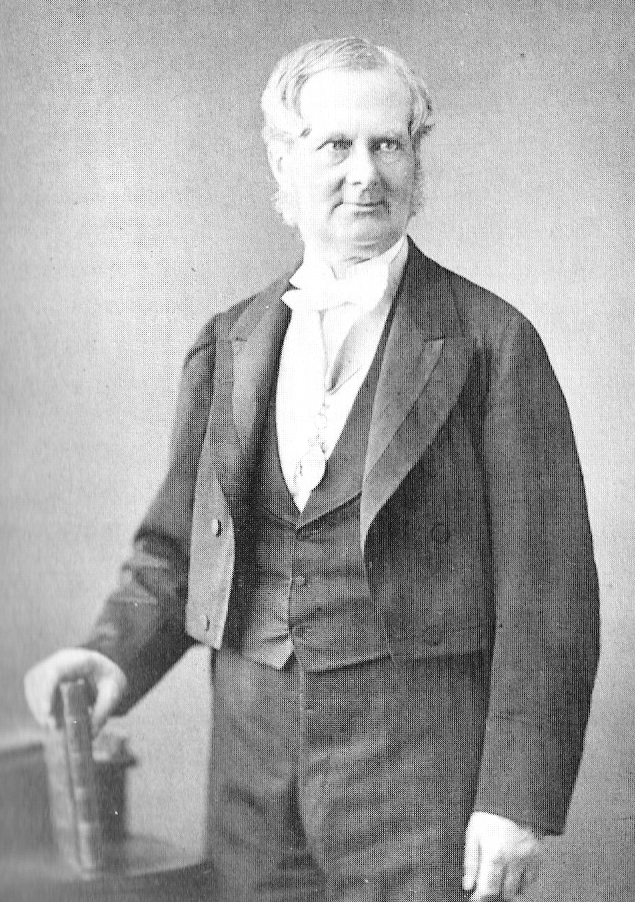
- Bernard Burke as Ulster King of Arms in 1867

Ulster King of Arms
- In office 1853–1892
- Monarch: Victoria
- Preceded by: Sir William Betham
- Succeeded by: Arthur Vicars

Personal details
- Born: John Bernard Burke; 5 January 1814 London
- Died: 12 December 1892 (aged 78) Dublin
- Children: Sir Henry Farnham Burke
- Parent: John Burke
- Known for: Genealogical publications
- Website: burkespeerage.com

Sir John Bernard Burke (5 January 1814 – 12 December 1892) was a British genealogist and Ulster King of Arms, who helped publish Burke's Peerage.

== Personal life ==
Burke, of Irish descent, was born at London and was educated in London and France. His father, John Burke (1787–1848), was also a notable genealogist who first produced, in 1826, a Genealogical and Heraldic Dictionary of the Peerage and Baronetage of the United Kingdom. This work, generally known as Burke's Peerage, was issued annually starting in 1847.

While practising as a barrister Burke assisted his father in his genealogical work, including the two volumes entitled The Royal Families of England, Scotland, and Wales, with their Descendants &c., which were not published until after his father's death (volume 1 in 1848, volume 2 in 1851), following which he took control of his publications. In 1853 Burke was appointed Ulster King of Arms.

In 1854, Burke was knighted. In 1855, he became Keeper of the State Papers in Ireland. After having devoted his life to genealogical studies he died in Dublin on 12 December 1892. He was succeeded as editor of Burke's Peerage and Landed Gentry by his fourth son, Ashworth Peter Burke.

Continuing Burke's strong family tradition of genealogy and heraldry, another of Burke's sons, Henry Farnham Burke, would eventually attain the office of Garter Principal King of Arms.

== Works ==
In addition to editing Burke's Peerage from 1847 until his death, Burke brought out several editions of a companion volume, Burke's Landed Gentry, which was first published between 1833 and 1838. In 1866 and 1883 he published editions of his father's Dictionary of the Peerages of England, Scotland and Ireland, extinct, dormant and in abeyance (earlier editions, 1831,1840, 1846); and in 1855 and 1876 editions of his Royal Families of England, Scotland and Wales (1st edition, 1847–1851). Integral to the study of historians was the publication in 1878 (enlarged edition in 1883) of his Encyclopaedia of Heraldry, or General Armory of England, Scotland and Ireland was published in 1848.

Sir Bernard's own works include:

- The Roll of Battle Abbey (1848)
- A Visitation of the Seats and Arms of the Noblemen and Gentlemen of Great Britain Vol. 1 (1852)
- The Romance of the Aristocracy (1855)
- The Romance of the Forum (1855–)
- Vicissitudes of Families (1883, and several earlier editions)
- The Rise of Great Families (1882)
- A Genealogical and Heraldic History of the Colonial Gentry. Vols 1 & 2 (1891)

== Arms ==
Coat of arms of Bernard Burke
Crest A cat-a-mountain sejant gardant proper, collar & chain or, on the breast a cross or Escutcheon Or, a cross gules with a lion sable in the first and fourth quarters Motto Ung Roy, Ung Foy, Ung Loy ("One king, one faith, one law") Symbolism After the arms of the House of de Burgh

== See also ==
- King of Arms
- College of Arms
- Genealogical Office
- Heraldry
- House of Burgh, an Anglo-Norman and Hiberno-Norman dynasty founded in 1193
- Earl of Clanricarde
- Clanricarde

Heraldic offices
Preceded by Sir William Betham	Ulster King of Arms; 1853–1892	Succeeded by Sir Arthur Vicars
