= Armorial of the House of Nassau =

This page shows the coats of arms, heraldic achievements, and heraldic flags of the House of Nassau.

Also included in the royal family section are the flags of the Dutch royal family. While not strictly a heraldic flag or a banner of arms, they are heavily influenced by heraldry. Flags of those born into the royal family feature a Nassau-blue cross on an orange field, while the colors are reversed for those who marry into the family. The males have near-square flags while those of females are swallowtailed. Elements of an individual's family coat of arms are also incorporated into the flags.

== Overview of Nassau arms ==
=== Background and origins ===
The ancestral coat of arms of the Ottonian line of the house of Nassau is shown below. Their distant cousins of the Walramian line added a red coronet to distinguish them. There is no documentation on how and why these arms came to be. As a symbol of nobility, the lion was always a popular in western culture going all the way back to Hercules. Using the heraldic insignia of a dominant power was a way, and still is a way, to show loyalty to that power. Not using that insignia is a way to show independence. The Netherlands, as territories bordering on the Holy Roman Empire with its Roman eagle and France with its Fleur-de-lis, had many examples of this. The lion was so heavily used in the Netherlands for various provinces and families (see Leo Belgicus) that it became the national arms of the Dutch Republic, its successor states the Netherlands, Belgium, and Luxembourg. Blue, because of its nearness to purple, which in the northern climes tended to fade (red was the other choice), was also a popular color for those with royal aspirations. The billets could have been anything from blocks of wood to abstractions of the reinforcements holding the shield together. The fact that these were arms were very similar to those of the counts of Burgundy (Franche-Comté) did not seem to cause too much confusion. It also held with one of the basic tenets of heraldry, that arms could not be repeated within a kingdom, but Nassau was considered to be in the Kingdom of Germany, while Franche-Comté was in the kingdom of Burgundy (see also Scrope v Grosvenor).

Coats of arms of sovereignty also show the territories that the dynasty claims to rule over. The principle ones are depicted below, i.e.

- The Principality of Orange, which gave them their major title and claim to equal status with all the other sovereign rulers of the world, Prince of Orange.

Then,

- The Lordship of Chalons and Arlay, a large set of lands in the Franche-Comté
- The County of Geneva

And in Germany,

- County of Katzenelnbogen a large set of lands near the County of Nassau
- The County of Dietz, also near the County of Nassau
- County of Meurs, bordering on the northeastern Netherlands

Finally, in the Netherlands, the real base of their wealth and power:

- County of Vianden, in the southern Netherlands along the river Meuse.
- Marquisate of Vlissingen (Flushing) and KampenVeere, which sat along the mouth of the Rhine and the trade routes across the North Sea and the world beyond.
- County of Buren, also long the delta of the Rhine, but further inland.

Arms of dynastic founders
Ottonian (Younger) Line	Walramian (Elder) Line

Arms of the dominions
Prince of Orange	Lords of Chalons and Arlay	Counts of Geneva
Counts of Katzenelnbogen	County of Dietz	Counts of Vianden
Marquis of Vlissingen (Flushing) and KampenVeere	Count of Buren	Count of Meurs

=== Arms of branches ===
Arms of the Grand Dukes of Luxembourg
Arms of Adolf of Nassau, King of Germany/King of the Romans (1292–1298)	Arms of the Grand Duke of Luxembourg (1890–1898)	Arms of the Grand Duke of Luxembourg (1898–2000)	Arms of the Grand Duke of Luxembourg (2000–present)	Personal Arms of the Grand Duke of Luxembourg (2000–present)

Arms of the Princes of Orange
Arms of René of Chalon and Nassau as Prince of Orange 1530–1544	Arms of the Prince of Orange 1544–1582, 1584–1618	Arms of the Prince of Orange 1582–1584, 1625–1702	Alternate arms of the Prince of Orange	Arms of William III as King of England, Scotland and Ireland, 1688–1702

Arms of the Kings of the Netherlands
Arms of the King of the Netherlands 1815–1907	Arms of the Queens and King of the Netherlands 1907–present	Arms of the Prince of Orange/Crown Prince of the Netherlands, 1980–2013	Arms of the Princess of Orange/Crown Princess of the Netherlands, 2013–present

== Counts of Nassau ==
Arms

Name and blazon
Dudo ( † 1117), Count of Laurenbourg approx. 1093 to 1117.

D'azur semé de billettes d'or, au lion du même, armé et lampassé de gueules, brochant sur le tout.

or

Azure billetty Or, a lion rampant of the last armed and langued gules.

- Arms subsequently borne by:
  - Rupert/Robert I, Count of Laurenburg, died before 1154,
  - Walram I^{er} of Laurenburg and Nassau, Co-count of Nassau from 1152 to 1190, count of Nassau from 1190 to 1198,
  - Henry II, Count of Nassau, Co-count of Nassau from 1198 to 1239, count of Nassau from 1239 to 1249.

== Walramian line ==
=== Comtes de Nassau-Wiesbaden-Idstein ===
Achievement
Arms
Name and blazon

Walram II, Count of Nassau, Co-count of Nassau from 1249 to 1255, count of Nassau-Wiesbaden, count of Nassau-Idstein from 1255 to 1276,

D'azur, semé de billettes d'or, au lion couronné du second, armé, lampassé de gueules.

or

Azure billetty Or, a lion rampant crowned of the last armed and langued gules.

Adolf, King of the Romans (v. 1255- 2 July 1298), king of Germany (formally king of the Romans) from 1292 to 1298, count of Nassau-Wiesbaden, count of Nassau-Weilburg, count of Nassau-Idstein from 1276 to 1298.

D'or, à l'aigle monocéphale de sable, membrée, becquée et liée de gueules; sur le tout d'azur, semé de billettes, au lion coiffé d'une couronne fermée, le tout d'or, armé et lampassé de gueules.

or

Or, and single-headed eagle sable, talons, beak and tongue gules; overall sur le tout Azure billetty Or, a lion rampant crowned of the last armed and langued gules (Nassau).

=== Counts of Nassau-Weilburg ===
==== Branches of Nassau-Weilburg ====
Achievement
Arms
Name and blazon

John I^{st} of Nassau-Weilburg, co-count of Nassau-Weilburg (1355–1371), count of Nassau-Weilburg (1309 à 1371),

Party per fess of 2, the two quarter on the chief divided into two forming 7 quarters: I: azure semeé of cross crosslets argent with a lion rampant of the same crowned or overlying the field (Saarbrücken); II sable a two headed eagle argent armed and beaked or and langued gueules (Sarrewerden); III or a fess sable (Moers); IV Gules two lions passant guardant Or, armed and langued azure (Dietz); V vert a saltire d'or cantoned between four cross crosslets of the same (Merenberg); VI or a fess gueules (Lahr); VII or a lion sable armed and langued gueules (Mahlberg); overall at the fess point an inescutcheon Azure billetty Or, a lion rampant crowned of the last armed and langued gules (Nassau).

Philip I^{st} of Nassau-Weilburg, Co-count of Nassau, count of Nassau-Wiesbaden, count of Nassau-Idstein, count of Nassau-Saarbrücken, count of Nassau-Neuweilnau,

Quarterly: I and IV Azure billetty Or, a lion rampant crowned of the last armed and langued gules (Nassau); II and III azure semeé of cross crosslets argent with a lion rampant of the same crowned or overlying the field (Saarbrücken). Helm: a lion seated or, between two wings displayed and a mantle azure billetty or.

Arms also borne by:

- John II of Nassau-Saarbrücken (1423- 1472), count of Nassau-Saarbrücken,

William Louis, Count of Nassau-Saarbrücken (1590- 1640), count of Nassau-Saarbrücken, count of Nassau-Ottweiler 1629 to 1640,

Quarterly: I Azure billetty Or, a lion rampant crowned of the last armed and langued gules (Nassau); II or a fess sable (Moers); III sable a two headed eagle argent armed and beaked or and langued gueules (Sarrewerden); IV azure semeé of cross crosslets argent with a lion rampant of the same crowned or overlying the field (Saarbrücken); overall at the fess point, per pale 1 or a fess gueules (Lahr); 2 or a lion sable armed and langued gueules (Mahlberg).

==== Branche cadette de Nassau-Weilburg ====
Achievement	Arms	Name and blazon
		John Ernst, Count of Nassau-Weilburg, count 1675 to 1719, Party per fess of 2, the two quarter on the chief divided into two forming 7 quarters: I: azure semeé of cross crosslets argent with a lion rampant of the same crowned or overlying the field (Saarbrücken); II sable a two headed eagle argent armed and beaked or and langued gueules (Sarrewerden); III or a fess sable (Moers); IV Gules two lions passant guardant Or, armed and langued azure (Dietz); V vert a saltire d'or cantoned between four cross crosslets of the same (Merenberg); VI or a fess gueules (Lahr); VII or a lion sable armed and langued gueules (Mahlberg); overall at the fess point an inescutcheon Azure billetty Or, a lion rampant crowned of the last armed and langued gules (Nassau).

=== Princes of Nassau-Weilburg ===
In 1816, the princes of Nassau-Weilburg had inherited all the other Walramian Nassau territories by the family compact and by the Congress of Vienna became dukes of Nassau.

==== Dukes of Nassau ====
Achievement

Arms

Name and blazon
William, Duke of Nassau, (1792–1839) duke of Nassau 1816 à 1839,

Per pale three party per fesse in three,: I or a lion sable armed and languled gueules; II Gules two lions passant guardant Or, armed and langued azure (Dietz); III, or, two lions passant guardant gueules armed and langued azure; IV Or a lion rampant guardant Gules crowned Azure (Katzenelnbogen); V azure three mallets argent; VI (formed as an inescutcheon at the fess point with VII, X and XI) argent a cross gueules, VII sable lion or, armed, languled and crowned gueules (Palatine Lion), VIII gueules lion passant guardant or, armed and langued azure, tail forked and crossed in saltire (Sayn); XI argent a cross sable (Fulda); XII azure a fess a fess chequy argent and gueules with six billettes aligned horizontally or, three in the chief, three in the base; XIII argent three chevrons gueules (Ravensburg); XIV argent three palets sable (Wittgenstein); XV gueules a castle with a roof argent, windows and portal sable; XVI sable a bar argent charged with three wild boar's heads couped (cut off straight line), sable, langued de gueules; overall at the fess point an inescutcheon Azure billetty Or, a lion rampant crowned of the last armed and langued gules (Nassau).

- Arms borne also by:
  - Adolphe I^{er} of Luxembourg, duke of Nassau 1839 – 1866 (duchy conquered by Prussia and incorporated into the province of Hesse-Nassau), son of the preceding,

===== House of Nassau-Weilburg, Grand Dukes of Luxembourg =====
Achievement

Arms

Name and blazon
Adolphe I^{er} of Luxembourg, duke of Nassau 1839 à 1866, grand-duke of Luxembourg (1890–1905),

Arms at his accession (1890)

Barry of ten Argent and Azure, a Lion rampant queue forchée Gules crowned, armed and langued Or (Luxembourg), on the shoulder of the lion gules an inescutcheon Azure billetty Or, a lion rampant crowned of the last armed and langued gules (Nassau). Above the shield a grand-ducal crown with a bonnet purple, the whole surrounded by the ribbon and cross of the Order of the Oak Crown, supported by two lions crowned or and impasse gules, the whole in a mantle of purple with ermine and fringed with gold.

Les armoiries prises en 1898:

Quarterly, I and IV Azure billetty Or, a lion rampant crowned of the last armed and langued gules (Nassau); II and III Barry of ten Argent and Azure, a Lion rampant queue forchée Gules crowned, armed and langued Or (Luxembourg). Supporters, two lions reguardant queue forchée crowned Or, armed and langued Gules. On the greater arms only, the supporters are holding a lance Or, flying the flag of Luxembourg. The whole resting on a Mantle Gules lined Ermine, fringed and tasseled Or, surmounted with the Grand-Ducal Crown.

Lesser Arms

The same, with a grand-ducal crown without a bonnet.

Middle Arms

The same, Les mêmes, standing on a compartment as supporters two lions crowned with the grand-ducal crown or, langued gueles.

Greater Arms

Per pale three party per fesse in three, the four-quarters in the center formatted as an inescutcheon sur-le-tout at the fesse point Quarterly, I and IV Nassau and II and III Luxembourg, I azure semeé of cross crosslets argent with a lion rampant of the same crowned or overlying the field (Saarbrücken), au II vert a saltire d'or cantoned between four cross crosslets of the same (Merenberg); III or two lions passant guardant gueules, armed and langued azure (Weilnau); IV or a fess sable (Moers); V Or a lion rampant guardant Gules armed and langued azure; VI Azure billetty Or, a lion rampant crowned of the last armed and langued gules(Nassau); VI Barry of ten Argent and Azure, a Lion queue forchée rampant Gules crowned, armed and langued Or (Luxembourg); VIII sable a two-headed eagle argent armed and beaked or and langued gueules (Sarrewerden); IX Gules two lions passant guardant Or, armed and langued azure (Dietz); X (Luxembourg); XI (Nassau); XII or a fess gueules (Lahr); XIII Gules a fess Argent (Vianden); XIV argent paly of three sable (Kirchberg); XV gueules lion passant guardant or, armed and langued azure, tail forked and crossed in saltire (Sayn); XVI or a lion sable armed and langued gueules (Mahlberg). The shield surmounted by 6 helms, supported by two lions passant reguardant crowned with coronets or and armed and langued gueules, posed on two rinceaux interlaced or, the whole over a mantel of purple on the outside and ermine on the inside fringed and tasseled or, surmounted with a grand-ducal crown with a bonnet purple.

- Arms borne after him by:
  - William IV, Grand Duke of Luxembourg (1852–1912), grand duke of Luxembourg and duke of Nassau, son of the preceding,
  - Marie-Adélaïde, Grand Duchess of Luxembourg (1894–1924), grand duchess of Luxembourg and duchess of Nassau, eldest daughter of the preceding,
  - Charlotte, Grand Duchess of Luxembourg (1896–1985), grand duchess of Luxembourg and duchess of Nassau, sister of the preceding,

===== House of Nassau-Weilburg, princes of Bourbon-Parma =====
Achievement
Arms
Name and blazon

Jean, Grand Duke of Luxembourg, grand-duke of Luxembourg (1964–2000), son of Charlotte, Grand Duchess of Luxembourg and Prince Felix of Bourbon-Parma,

Arms assigned on his majority (1939): Quarterly: I et IV azure bordure Gules three fleurs-de-lys Or (House of Bourbon-Spain/Bourbon-Anjou); II and III Azure billetty Or, a lion rampant crowned of the last armed and langued gules (Nassau); on the fess point/sur le tout an inescutcheon Barry of ten Argent and Azure, a Lion rampant queue forchée Gules crowned, armed and langued Or (Luxembourg), the shield with a royal/grand ducal crown and bonnet purple.

Arms assigned on his marriage to princess Princess Joséphine Charlotte of Belgium (1953): Per pale, I Azure billetty Or, a lion rampant crowned of the last armed and langued gules (Nassau); II Barry of ten Argent and Azure, a Lion rampant queue forchée Gules crowned, armed and langued Or (Luxembourg); in the middle base point over the partition pazure bordure Gules charged with eight escallops Argent, three fleurs-de-lys Or (Bourbon-Parma); over the shield the royal/grand ducal crown and bonnet purple.

On his succession in (1964), he used the arms of his mother.

Henri, Grand Duke of Luxembourg, (1955) grand-duke of Luxembourg (2000), son of preceding; and his son Guillaume V, Grand Duke of Luxembourg (2025)

Quarterly, I and IV Barry of ten Argent and Azure, a Lion rampant queue forchée Gules crowned, armed and langued Or (Luxembourg); II and III Azure billetty Or, a lion rampant crowned of the last armed and langued gules (Nassau), on the greater arms only, at the fess point an inescutcheon azure bordure Gules charged with eight escallops Argent, three fleurs-de-lys Or (Bourbon-Parma). Supporters, two lions reguardant queue forchée crowned Or, armed and langued Gules, on the greater arms only, the supporters are holding a lance Or, flying the flag of Luxembourg. The whole resting on a Mantle Gules lined Ermine, fringed and tasseled Or, summoned to the Grand-Ducal Crown..

Lesser coat of arms: Quarterly, I and IV Barry of ten Argent and Azure, a Lion rampant queue forchée Gules crowned, armed and langued Or (Luxembourg); II and III Azure billetty Or, a lion rampant crowned of the last armed and langued gules (Nassau), with the grand ducal crown.

Middle Coat of Arms: Quarterly, I and IV Barry of ten Argent and Azure, a Lion rampant queue forchée Gules crowned, armed and langued Or (Luxembourg); II and III Azure billetty Or, a lion rampant crowned of the last armed and langued gules (Nassau), with the grand ducal crown above. Supporters, two lions reguardant queue forchée crowned Or, armed and langued Gules.

Greater Coat of Arms: full arms as described above.

Guillaume V, Grand Duke of Luxembourg, (1981) as crown prince (2000), eldest child of the preceding,

Coat of arms granted 2012:

Middle Coat of Arms:the same as his father with overall a label or.

Greater Coat of Arms: the same as his father with overall a label or.

== Ottonian Line ==
Achievement
Arms
Name and blazon

Otho I of Nassau (1247 † 1290), co-count of Nassau, count of Nassau-Siegen, count of Nassau-Dillenbourg, count of Nassau-Beilstein, count of Nassau-Ginsberg,

D'azur semé de billettes d'or, au lion du même, armé et lampassé de gueules, brochant sur le tout.

or

Azure billetty Or, a lion rampant of the last armed and langued gules.

Otto II of Nassau-Siegen (c. 1305 † 1350/1351), comte de Nassau, de Nassau-Dillenbourg et de Nassau-Siegen,

Quarterly, I Azure billetty a lion rampant Or (for Nassau); II Or a lion rampant guardant Gules crowned Azure (Katzenelnbogen); III Gules a fess Argent (Vianden), IV Gules two lions passant guardant Or, armed and langued azure (Dietz).

- Arms borne also by:
  - John I of Nassau-Siegen (c. 1339 † 1416), Count of Nassau-Siegen, son of Otto II;
  - John II of Nassau-Siegen (died 1443), Count of Nassau-Siegen, son of John I;

Henry I, Count of Nassau-Beilstein, count of Nassau-Beilstein (Count of Nassau in Beilstein). In 1343, Nassau-Beilstein was split off from Nassau-Dillenburg. In 1561 the possessions of the house of Nassau-Beilstein were inherited by the house of Nassau-Dillenburg.

Quarterly, I Azure billetty a lion rampant Or (for Nassau); II Or a lion rampant guardant Gules crowned Azure (Katzenelnbogen); III Gules a fess Argent (Vianden), IV Gules two lions passant guardant Or, armed and langued azure (Dietz).

=== Counts of Nassau-Dillenburg ===
Henry III of Nassau-Breda came to the Netherlands in 1499 as heir to his uncle, Engelbrecht II of Nassau-Breda. His and his uncle's arms are shown below. When Philbert, prince of Orange died in 1530, his sister's son René of Breda inherited the Princedom of Orange on condition that he used the name and coat of arms of the Châlon-Orange family. History knows him therefore as René of Châlon instead of as "René of Nassau-Breda." The 1st and 4th grand quarters show the arms of the Chalons-Arlay (the gold bend) princes of Orange (the bugle). The blue and gold cross is the arms of Jeanne of Geneva, who married one of the Chalons princes. The 2nd and 3rd show the quarterings of Brittany and Luxembourg-St. Pol. The inescutcheon overall is his paternal arms quartered of Nassau and Breda. William the Silent's father, William the Rich, was rich only in children. He bore the arms shown below. Clockwise from upper left they displayed the arms of Nassau (1st quarter), Katzenelenbogen (3rd quarter), Dietz (2nd quarter), Vianden (4th quarter).

Achievement
Arms
Name and blazon

Engelbert II of Nassau (1451–1504), Count of Nassau-Dillenbourg and Vianden, and lord of Breda, Lek, Diest, Roosendaal, Nispen and Wouw. He was for some time leader of the Privy council of the Duchy of Burgundy. In 1501, Maximilian named him Lieutenant-General of the Low Countries. From that point forward (until his death in 1504) Engelbert was the principal representative of the Habsburg Empire to the region.

Quarterly, I and IV Azure billetty a lion rampant Or (Nassau); II and III Gules a fess Argent (Vianden)

John V, Count of Nassau-Siegen,

Quarterly: I and IV azure sown with billets of gold, the lion of the same, armed and langued Gules, debruising over all (Nassau ); II and III gules two armed leopards of gold, langued and crowned Azure (Dietz ).

After 1504: quarterly: I and IV of azure sown with billets of gold, to the lion of the same, armed and langued Gules, debruising on the whole (Nassau ); II and III Gules two leopards Or armed, langued and crowned Azure (Dietz), sur-le-tout Gules a fess Argent (Vianden ).

Henry III of Nassau-Breda, count of Nassau, lord of Breda, de Lek and Diest,

Quarterly, I and IV Azure billetty a lion rampant Or (Nassau); II and III Gules a fess Argent (Vianden).

William of Nassau the Rich or the Old (1487 † 1559), Count of Nassau-Siegen,

Quarterly, I Azure billetty a lion rampant Or (for Nassau); II Or a lion rampant guardant Gules crowned Azure (Katzenelnbogen); III Gules a fess Argent (Vianden), IV Gules two lions passant guardant Or, armed and langued azure (Dietz).

==== Illegitimate Lines of the House of Nassau-Breda & Dillenburg ====
The House of Nassau-Corroy is a bastard branch of the House of Nassau. Unlike the main branch of the House of Nassau, this illegitimate branch was faithful to the king of Spain and Roman Catholic.

Achievement

Arms

Name and blazon
Alexis van Nassau-Corroy, illeg. son of Henry III of Nassau-Breda, lord of Corroy (descendants made Count of Corroy, 1693) Count of Zwevegem, Baron of Warcoing, Lord of Frasnes-lez-Gosselies,

Quarterly, I and IV Azure billetty a lion rampant Or (Nassau); II and III Gules a fess Argent (Vianden).

=== The Great Princes of Orange, House of Orange-Nassau ===
As the kingdom of Burgundy fragmented in the early Middle Ages, the Holy Roman Emperor Frederick I Barbarossa elevated the lordship of Orange to a principality in 1163 to shore up his supporters in Burgundy against the Pope and the King of France. As the Empire's boundaries retreated from those of the principality, the prince acceded to the sovereign rights that the Emperor formerly exercised. As William the Silent wrote in his marriage proposal to the uncle of his second wife, the Elector August of Saxony, he held Orange as "my own free property", not as a fief of any suzerain; neither the Pope, nor the Kings of Spain or France.

On becoming prince of Orange, William placed the Châlon-Arlay arms in the center ("as an inescutcheon") of his father's arms. He used these arms until 1582 when he purchased the marquisate of Veere and Vlissingen. It had been the property of Philip II since 1567, but had fallen into arrears to the province. In 1580 the Court of Holland ordered it sold. William bought it as it gave him two more votes in the States of Zeeland. He owned the government of the two towns, and so could appoint their magistrates. He already had one as First Noble for Philip William, who had inherited Maartensdijk. This made William the predominant member of the States of Zeeland. It was a smaller version of the countship of Zeeland (& Holland) promised to William, and was a potent political base for his descendants. William then added the shield of Veere and Buren to his arms as shown in the arms of Frederick Henry, William II and William III with the arms of the marquisate in the top center, and the arms of the county of Buren in the bottom center. William also started the tradition of keeping the number of billets in the upper left quarter for Nassau at 17 to symbolize the original 17 provinces of the Burgundian/Habsburg Netherlands, which he always hoped would form one united nation.

As sovereign Princes, the princes of Orange used an independent prince's crown or the princely hat. Sometimes, only the coronet part was used (see, here and here). After the establishment of the Kingdom of the Netherlands, and as the principality of Orange had been incorporated into France by Louis XIV, they used the Dutch Royal Crowns. The full coats of arms of the princes of Orange, later Kings of the Netherlands, incorporated the arms above, the crown, 2 lions as supporters and the motto "Je maintiendrai" ("I will maintain"), the latter taken from the Chalons princes of Orange, who used "Je maintiendrai Chalons".

Achievement
Arms
Name and blazon

René de Nassau, assumed surname of Châlon, Prince of Orange and Stadtholder of Holland, Zeeland, Utrecht and Gelderland

Grand quarterly, I and IV Quarterly, 1 and 4, gueules, a bend or (Chalon-Arlay), II and III or, a hunting horn, azure, wrapped and banded in a ribbon gueules (Orange); sur-le-tout-du-tout or five points, the quarterly equipodes azure (Genève); I and IV Quarterly 1. and 4. ermine (Brittany), 2. and 3. argent, a lion gueles crowned or, armed and languled azure (Luxembourg); at the fess point an inescutcheon, Quarterly, I and IV Azure billetty a lion rampant Or (Nassau); II and III Gules a fess Argent (Vianden) .

Puis,

William I of Orange-Nassau called "the Silent" or in French Le Taciturne or Le Silencieux or Le Jeune (1544–1584), Prince of Orange (1544–1584), stadholder of Holland, Zeeland and Utrecht (1559–1567) and (1572–1584)

Arms 1544–1582:Quarterly, I Azure billetty a lion rampant Or (for Nassau); II Or a lion rampant guardant Gules crowned Azure (Katzenelnbogen); III Gules a fess Argent (Vianden), IV Gules two lions passant guardant Or, armed and langued azure (Dietz); at the fess point an inescutcheon, quarterly I and IV Gules, a bend Or (Châlons); II and III Or a bugle hunting horn Azure, stringed Gules (Orange) with an inescutcheon, Nine pieces Or and Azure (Geneva). The motto: Je Maintiendrai (medieval French for "I will maintain"). The motto represents the House of Orange-Nassau, since it came into the family with the Principality of Orange.

- Arms borne by:
  - Philip William of Orange, son of the preceding, prince of Orange (1584–1618)

Arms after 1582: Quarterly, I Azure billetty a lion rampant Or (for Nassau); II Or a lion rampant guardant Gules crowned Azure (Katzenelnbogen); III Gules a fess Argent (Vianden), IV Gules two lions passant guardant Or, armed and langued azure (Dietz); between the I and II quarters an inescutcheon, Sable a fess argent (Flushing); at the fess point an inescutcheon, quarterly I and IV Gules, a bend Or (Châlons); II and III Or a bugle hunting horn Azure, stringed Gules (Orange) with an inescutcheon, Nine pieces Or and Azure (Geneva); between the III and IV quarters, an inescutcheon, Gules a fess counter embattled Argent (Buren). The motto: Je Maintiendrai (medieval French for "I will maintain"). The motto represents the House of Orange-Nassau, since it came into the family with the Principality of Orange.

- Arms borne by:
  - Fredrick Henry, son of the William the Silent, (1584–1647), Prince of Orange and Stadholder (1625–1647)
  - William II, son of Frederick Henry, (1626–1650), Prince of Orange and Stadholder (1657–1650)
  - William III, son of William II, (1650–1702), Prince of Orange (1650–1702), Stadholder (1672–1702), King of England, Scotland, and Ireland (1688–1702)

The title Prince of Orange after this became practically synonymous with the stadholder of the most important provinces of the Republic and so its leading personage.

Maurice of Nassau, half brother of Philip William of Orange, stadholder of Holland and Zeeland, etc. (1585–1625), prince of Orange (1618–1625).

Quarterly: arms of Saxony (the arms of his mother)sur-le-tout on a shield grand quarterly: I & IV: Quarterly, I Azure billetty a lion rampant Or (for Nassau); II Or a lion rampant guardant Gules crowned Azure (Katzenelnbogen); III Gules a fess Argent (Vianden), IV Gules two lions passant guardant Or, armed and langued azure (Dietz); sur-le-tout Or a fess Sable (Moers) in grand quarters II and III; I and IV Gules, a bend Or (Châlons); II and III Or a bugle hunting horn Azure, stringed Gules (Orange) with an inescutcheon, Nine pieces Or and Azure (Geneva);

Fredrick Henry, half brother of Maurice, Prince of Orange, Prince of Orange (1625–1647

Alternative version as seen in contemporary images:

Quarterly, I Azure billetty a lion rampant Or (for Nassau); II Or a lion rampant guardant Gules crowned Azure (Katzenelnbogen); III Gules a fess Argent (Vianden), IV Gules two lions passant guardant Or, armed and langued azure (Dietz); between the I and II quarters an inescutcheon, Or a fess Sable (Moers); at the fess point an inescutcheon, quarterly I and IV Gules, a bend Or (Châlons); II and III Or a bugle hunting horn Azure, stringed Gules (Orange) with an inescutcheon, Nine pieces Or and Azure (Geneva); between the III and IV quarters, an inescutcheon, Gules a fess counter embattled Argent (Buren). The motto: Je Maintiendrai (medieval French for "I will maintain"). The motto represents the House of Orange-Nassau, since it came into the family with the Principality of Orange

- Arms borne by:
  - William II, son of Frederick Henry, (1626–1650), Prince of Orange and Stadholder (1647–1650)
  - William III, son of William II, (1650–1702), Prince of Orange (1650–1702), Stadholder (1672–1702), King of England, Scotland, and Ireland (1688–1702)

Here are the armories of William II and III as sovereign princes of Orange and knights of the Garter.

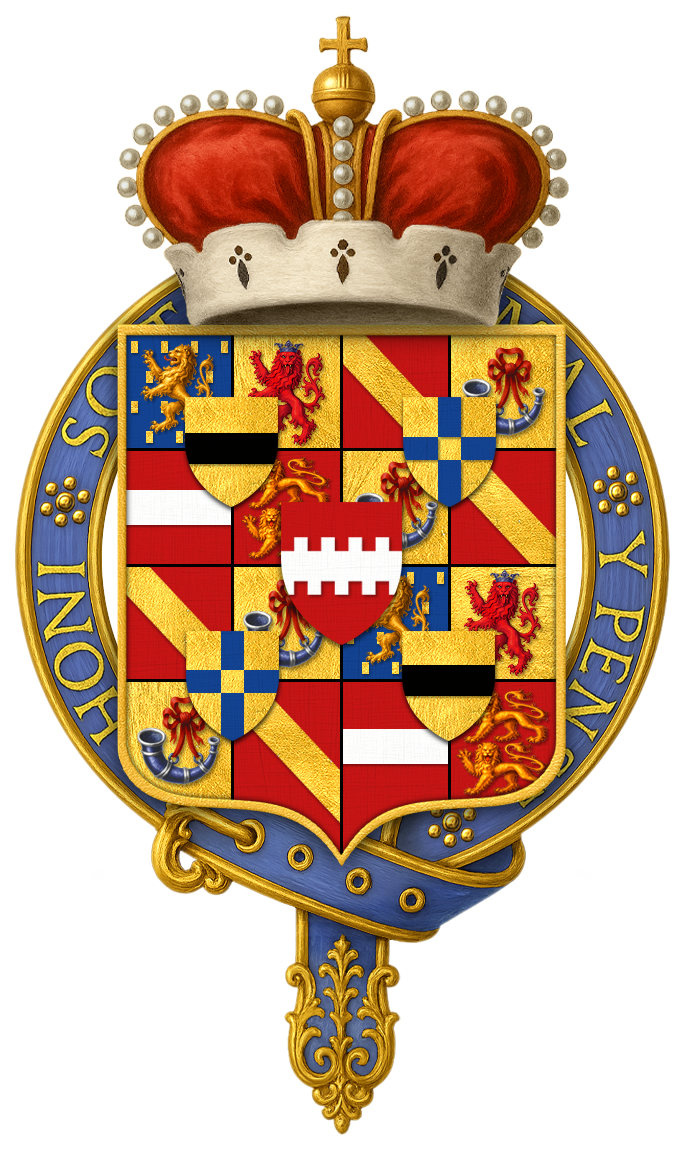
Armoiries de Frederick Henry comme un chevalier de la Jarretière

Fredrick Henry, personal arms before 1625

Quarterly: sur-le-tout the arms of Coligny Gules an eagle displayed argent beaked langued membered armed and crowned azure (the arms of his mother, daughter of Gaspard II, amiral de France) on a shield grand quarterly: I & IV: Quarterly, I Azure billetty a lion rampant Or (for Nassau); II Or a lion rampant guardant Gules crowned Azure (Katzenelnbogen); III Gules a fess Argent (Vianden), IV Gules two lions passant guardant Or, armed and langued azure (Dietz); sur-le-tout Or a fess Sable (Moers) in grand quarters II and III; I and IV Gules, a bend Or (Châlons); II and III Or a bugle hunting horn Azure, stringed Gules (Orange) with an inescutcheon, Nine pieces Or and Azure (Geneva).

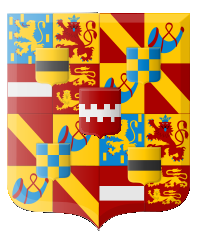

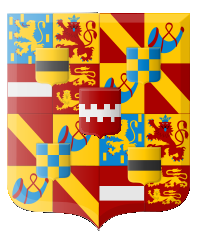
William II, personal arms before 1648 as count of Buren

Ecartelé: sur-le-tout the arms of (Buren) Gules a fess counter embattled Argent (Buren) on a shield grand quarterly: I & IV: Quarterly, I Azure billetty a lion rampant Or (for Nassau); II Or a lion rampant guardant Gules crowned Azure (Katzenelnbogen); III Gules a fess Argent (Vianden), IV Gules two lions passant guardant Or, armed and langued azure (Dietz); sur-le-tout Or a fess Sable (Moers) in grand quarters II and III; I and IV Gules, a bend Or (Châlons); II and III Or a bugle hunting horn Azure, stringed Gules (Orange) with an inescutcheon, Nine pieces Or and Azure (Geneva).

Mary of England, princess of Orange, 1677–1689, arms on the expeditionary banner of William III of Orange and Mary of England, 1688

Per pale: 1. as Prince of Orange, William's coat of arms was: Quarterly, I Azure billetty a lion rampant Or (for Nassau); II Or a lion rampant guardant Gules crowned Azure (Katzenelnbogen); III Gules a fess Argent (Vianden), IV Gules two lions passant guardant Or, armed and langued azure (Dietz); between the I and II quarters an inescutcheon, Or a fess Sable (Moers); at the fess point an inescutcheon, quarterly I and IV Gules, a bend Or (Châlons); II and III Or a bugle horn Azure, stringed Gules (Orange) with an inescutcheon, Nine pieces Or and Azure (Geneva); between the III and IV quarters, an inescutcheon, Gules a fess counter embattled Argent (Buren). 2. Mary's arms as princess of England were: Quarterly, I and IV Grand quarterly, Azure three fleurs-de-lis Or (for France) and Gules three lions passant guardant in pale Or (for England); II Or a lion rampant within a double tressure flory-counter-flory Gules (for Scotland); III Azure a harp Or stringed Argent (for Ireland); overall a label argent.

==== Illegitimate Lines of Orange-Nassau ====
Armoiries
Arms
Name and blazon

Justinus of Nassau, illegitimate son of William the Silent, Admiral & General, Governor of Breda

Quarterly, I Azure billetty a lion rampant Or (for Nassau); II Or a lion rampant guardant Gules crowned Azure (Katzenelnbogen); III Gules a fess Argent (Vianden), IV Gules two lions passant guardant Or, armed and langued azure (Dietz); a bend argent; at the fess point an inescutcheon, quarterly I and IV Gules, a bend Or (Châlons); II and III Or a bugle horn Azure, stringed Gules (Orange) with an inescutcheon, Nine pieces Or and Azure (Geneva).

Louis of Nassau, lord of den Lek and Beverweerd, Premier Noble of the Province of Holland, illegitimate son of Maurice, Prince of Orange,

Quarterly, I Azure billetty a lion rampant Or (for Nassau); II Or a lion rampant guardant Gules crowned Azure (Katzenelnbogen); III Gules a fess Argent (Vianden), IV Gules two lions passant guardant Or, armed and langued azure (Dietz); at the fess point an inescutcheon, argent a lion rampant sable, armed and langued gules (den Lek).

- Arms borne also by:
  - Henry de Nassau, Lord Overkirk, (in Dutch Ouderkerk), son of above,
    - Henry de Nassau d'Auverquerque, 1st Earl of Grantham, son of preceding, Earl of Grantham in England
  - the succeeding counts of Nassau-den Lek (in the 19th century the counts of Nassau-La Lecq in the Netherlands, as the eldest branch of the house of Nassau of the Ottonian branch, bore only the ancient arms of the counts of Nassau.)
  - counts of Nassau-Odijk in the Netherlands

Frederick of Nassau, lord of Zuylestein an illegitimate son of Frederick Henry, Prince of Orange,

Quarterly, I Azure billetty a lion rampant Or (for Nassau); II Or a lion rampant guardant Gules crowned Azure (Katzenelnbogen); III Gules a fess Argent (Vianden), IV Gules two lions passant guardant Or, armed and langued azure (Dietz); at the fess point an inescutcheon, gueules three pillars argent 2 and 1, a label of the second overall.

Henry de Nassau d'Auverquerque, 1st Earl of Grantham, son of Henry de Nassau, Lord Overkirk, Earl of Grantham in England

Quarterly, I Azure billetty a lion rampant Or (for Nassau); II Or a lion rampant guardant Gules crowned Azure (Katzenelnbogen); III Gules a fess Argent (Vianden), IV Gules two lions passant guardant Or, armed and langued azure (Dietz); at the fess point an inescutcheon, argent a lion rampant sable, armed and langued gules (den Lek).

William de Nassau-Zuylestein, Earl of Rochford, secretary of state for the Northern Department, descendant of Frederick of Nassau, lord of Zuylestein an illegitimate son of Frederick Henry, Prince of Orange,

Quarterly, I Azure billetty a lion rampant Or (for Nassau); II Or a lion rampant guardant Gules crowned Azure (Katzenelnbogen); III Gules a fess Argent (Vianden), IV Gules two lions passant guardant Or, armed and langued azure (Dietz); at the fess point an inescutcheon, gueules three pillars argent 2 and 1, a label of the second overall.

==== King of England, Scotland, and Ireland ====
Achievement

Arms

Plus,

Plus,

Name and blazon
William III of Orange and Nassau, Prince of Orange, Count of Nassau baron of Breda, and Stadtholder of Holland and Zeeland, Stadtholder of Utrecht, Stadtholder of Gelderland and Overijssel, plus King of England, Scotland, and Ireland,

Arms as Prince of Orange, as above. As prince of England, Scotland, and Ireland (in right of his mother Mary, Princess Royal and Princess of Orange (Princess Royal)).

As King and Queen of England, Scotland and Ireland,

Cojoint with his wife and cousin Mary II: Per pale: 1. Quarterly, I and IV Grand quarterly, Azure three fleurs-de-lis Or (for France) and Gules three lions passant guardant in pale Or (for England); II Or a lion rampant within a double tressure flory-counter-flory Gules (for Scotland); III Azure a harp Or stringed Argent (for Ireland); overall an escutcheon Azure billetty a lion rampant Or., 2. Quarterly, I and IV Grand quarterly, Azure three fleurs-de-lis Or (for France) and Gules three lions passant guardant in pale Or (for England); II Or a lion rampant within a double tressure flory-counter-flory Gules (for Scotland); III Azure a harp Or stringed Argent (for Ireland).

As King of England, Scotland, and Ireland,

Quarterly, I and IV Grand quarterly, Azure three fleurs-de-lis Or (for France) and Gules three lions passant guardant in pale Or (for England); II Or a lion rampant within a double tressure flory-counter-flory Gules (for Scotland); III Azure a harp Or stringed Argent (for Ireland); overall an escutcheon Azure billetty a lion rampant Or. In his later coat of arms, William used the motto: Je Maintiendrai (medieval French for "I will maintain"). The motto represents the House of Orange-Nassau, since it came into the family with the Principality of Orange.

=== Princes of Nassau-Dillenbourg and princes of Nassau-Siegen ===
In 1739 the House of Orange-Nassau inherited the possessions of the Nassau-Dillenbourg line.

Achievement

after 1654:

with crests:

Arms

Name and blazon
Johann VI, Count of Nassau-Dillenburg, count of Nassau-Dillenbourg (Count of Nassau in Dillenburg), Nassau-Siegen, Nassau-Hadamar et de Nassau-Dietz, Stadholder of Friesland, Gelderland and Zutphen,

Quarterly, I Azure billetty a lion rampant Or (for Nassau); II Or a lion rampant guardant Gules crowned Azure (Katzenelnbogen); III Gules a fess Argent (Vianden), IV Gules two lions passant guardant Or, armed and langued azure (Dietz).

While already being princely counts, directly represented in the imperial diet and subject only to the Emperor, after 1654 Holy Roman Emperor Ferdinand III raised the whole House of Nassau to the rank of Princes of the Holy Roman Empire (Reichsfürst).

- Arms borne after him by:
  - William Louis, Count of Nassau-Dillenburg, son of John VI, count of Nassau-Dillenburg, Stadholder of Friesland, Groningen and Drenthe
  - John VII, Count of Nassau-Siegen, count of Nassau-Siegen, son of John VI
  - John VIII, Count of Nassau-Siegen, Count of Nassau-Siegen and marquis and Monte-Caballo, son of John VII. He founded the Roman Catholic branch of the counts of Nassau-Siegen.
  - John Maurice, Prince of Nassau-Siegen, surnamed "the Brazilian", son of John VII of Nassau-Siegen, Field Marshal of the Dutch States Army. He founded the Protestant branch of the counts of Nassau-Siegen. Arms on top of the Order of Saint John (Bailiwick of Brandenburg) and with the Danish Order of the Elephant:
  - John Francis Desideratus of Nassau-Siegen, count and prince of Nassau-Siegen, son of John VIII,
  - William Hyacinth, Prince of Nassau-Siegen son of the previous

=== Counts of Nassau-Siegen, protestant branch ===
Achievement

apres 1654:

Arms

Name and blazon
Henry of Nassau-Siegen, count and prince of Nassau-Siegen, brother of John Maurice, Prince of Nassau-Siegen, surnamed "the Brazilian"

Quarterly, I Azure billetty a lion rampant Or (for Nassau); II Or a lion rampant guardant Gules crowned Azure (Katzenelnbogen); III Gules a fess Argent (Vianden), IV Gules two lions passant guardant Or, armed and langued azure (Dietz); overall an inescutcheon on the fess point, 1, argent a lion rampant gueules (Limburg), 2, gueules a lion rampant argent armed and langued of the first (Bronckhorst), 3, or two lions passant gueules (Wisch), 4, gueules three bezants or (Borculo) (from the marriage in 1646 of Henri de Nassau-Siegen and Maria Magdalena of Limburg-Stirum for the lordship of Wisch, which entered the protestant line of the counts of Nassau-Siegen). Arms of House of Limburg-Stirum:

=== Nassau-Dietz ===
In 1606 the Nassau-Dillenburg branch partitioned also into Nassau-Dietz and Nassau-Siegen.

Achievement

apres 1654:

Arms

Puis,

Name and blazon
Ernest Casimir I, Count of Nassau-Dietz, count of Nassau-Dietz, stadtholder of Friesland, Drenthe and Groningen,

Quarterly, I Azure billetty a lion rampant Or (for Nassau); II Or a lion rampant guardant Gules crowned Azure (Katzenelnbogen); III Gules a fess Argent (Vianden), IV Gules two lions passant guardant Or, armed and langued azure (Dietz) V, argent a stag passant gueules the crest of the stag passant (Spiegelberg); VI, argent a fess sable on top of in the chief two tufts or sheaves vert (Liesveld); overall an inescutcheon in the fess point argent a cross sable (cross of the Teutonic Order).

- Armes portées ensuite par:
  - Henry Casimir I of Nassau-Dietz (1612–1640), son of the above,
  - William Frederick, Prince of Nassau-Dietz (1613–1664), brother of preceding,
  - Henry Casimir II, Prince of Nassau-Dietz (1657–1696), son of preceding.

==== Princes of Orange-Nassau(-Dietz) ====
In 1702, the line of Nassau-Dietz inherited the principality of Orange according to the will of William III, and became the line of Orange-Nassau-Dietz. However, France disputed this and occupied the principality.

When John William Friso became Prince of Orange, he used the arms below. However, he was never recognized outside of Holland and areas friendly to Holland as Prince of Orange. His son, William IV, recognized as Prince of Orange, seems to have used the original arms of William the Silent. When the princes of Orange fled the Netherlands during the Batavian Republic and the Kingdom of Holland, and when France occupied the Netherlands, they were compensated by Napoleon with the Principality of Nassau-Orange-Fulda. These principalities were confiscated when Napoleon invaded Germany (1806) and William VI supported his Prussian relatives. He succeeded his father as Prince of Orange later that year, after William V's death. The house of Orange-Nassau also had several illegitimate lines (see below) who based their arms on the arms of Nassau-Dillenburg.

In 1814, the Congress of Vienna reached a concord that awarded the whole county of Nassau, raised to a duchy, to the Walramian branch (Nassau-Weilburg). In compensation, the Ottonian Branch (princes of Orange), and then raised to King of the Netherlands, were awarded the Grand Duchy of Luxemburg as their personal dominion. So, when Belgium became independent, Luxemburg remained with the house of Orange-Nassau in personal union with the Dutch monarch. In 1890, with the death of William III of the Netherlands, Luxemburg was inherited by the Walramian branch as part of this compact.

Achievement
Arms
Name and blazon

John William Friso, Prince of Orange, prince of Nassau-Dietz, stadthouder of Friesland and Groningen, prince of Orange,

Quarterly, I Azure billetty a lion rampant Or (for Nassau); II Or a lion rampant guardant Gules crowned Azure (Katzenelnbogen); III Gules a fess Argent (Vianden), IV Gules two lions passant guardant Or, armed and langued azure (Dietz) V, argent a stag passant gueules the crest of the stag passant (Spiegelberg); VI, argent a fess sable on top of in the chief two tufts or sheaves vert (Liesveld); at the fess point an inescutcheon, quarterly I and IV Gules, a bend Or (Châlons); II and III Or a bugle horn Azure, stringed Gules (Orange) with an inescutcheon, Nine pieces Or and Azure (Geneva); at the honor point between the I and II quarters an inescutcheon, Or a fess Sable (Moers); at the nombril point between the V and VI quarters, an inescutcheon, Gules a fess counter embattled Argent (Buren). ;;

- Armes portées ensuite par:
  - William IV, Prince of Orange, prince of Nassau-Dietz, prince of Orange-Nassau, son of the preceding,

William IV, Prince of Orange, prince of Nassau-Dietz, prince of Orange-Nassau, Stadtholder of Friesland, then Stadtholder of Holland and Zeeland, Stadtholder of Utrecht, Stadtholder of Gelderland and Overijssel 1747 à 1751,

Quarterly, I Azure billetty a lion rampant Or (for Nassau); II Or a lion rampant guardant Gules crowned Azure (Katzenelnbogen); III Gules a fess Argent (Vianden), IV Gules two lions passant guardant Or, armed and langued azure (Dietz); at the fess point an inescutcheon, quarterly I and IV Gules, a bend Or (Châlons); II and III Or a bugle horn Azure, stringed Gules (Orange) with an inescutcheon, Nine pieces Or and Azure (Geneva). The motto: Je Maintiendrai (medieval French for "I will maintain"). The motto represents the House of Orange-Nassau, since it came into the family with the Principality of Orange.

- Armes portées ensuite par:
  - William V, Prince of Orange, prince of Nassau-Dietz, prince of Orange-Nassau, Stadtholder of Friesland, Holland and Zeeland, Stadtholder of Utrecht, Stadtholder of Gelderland and Overijssel de 1751 à 1795, son of preceding

Puis,

William VI of Orange-Nassau, prince of Nassau-Dietz, prince of Orange-Nassau, after 1815 King of the Netherlands.

the arms as Prince of Nassau-Orange-Fulda (1803–1813),

Quarterly, I argent a cross sable(principality of Fulda), II party per fess or and gueles (Corvey), III argent an eagle sable beaked, membered and langued (becquée et membrée et languée) gueles (Dortmund), IV azure, a lion passant or billetty lilypads (hearts) gueles (Weingarten); at the fess point overall an inescutcheon of the arms of the prince of Orange, Quarterly, I Azure billetty a lion rampant Or (for Nassau); II Or a lion rampant guardant Gules crowned Azure (Katzenelnbogen); III Gules a fess Argent (Vianden), IV Gules two lions passant guardant Or, armed and langued azure (Dietz); at the fess point an inescutcheon, quarterly I and IV Gules, a bend Or (Châlons); II and III Or a bugle horn Azure, stringed Gules (Orange) with an inescutcheon, Nine pieces Or and Azure (Geneva).

Then 1813 to 1815, as Sovereign Prince of the United Netherlands

Quarterly, I and IV Gules a crowned lion Or armed and langued Azure holding in his dexter paw a sword Argent hilted Or and in the sinister paw seven arrows Argent pointed and tight together or (arms of the Dutch Republic); II and III quarterly I and IV Gules, a bend Or (Châlons); II and III Or a bugle horn Azure, stringed Gules (Orange) with an inescutcheon, Nine pieces Or and Azure (Geneva); at the fess point overall an inescutcheon Azure billetty a lion rampant Or (for Nassau); The motto: Je Maintiendrai.

=== Counts and Princes of Nassau-Schaumburg ===
Achievement

Arms

Name and blazon
Adolph, Prince of Nassau-Schaumburg, count and prince of Nassau in Schaumburg, (1629 – 1676) son of Louis Henry, Prince of Nassau-Dillenburg

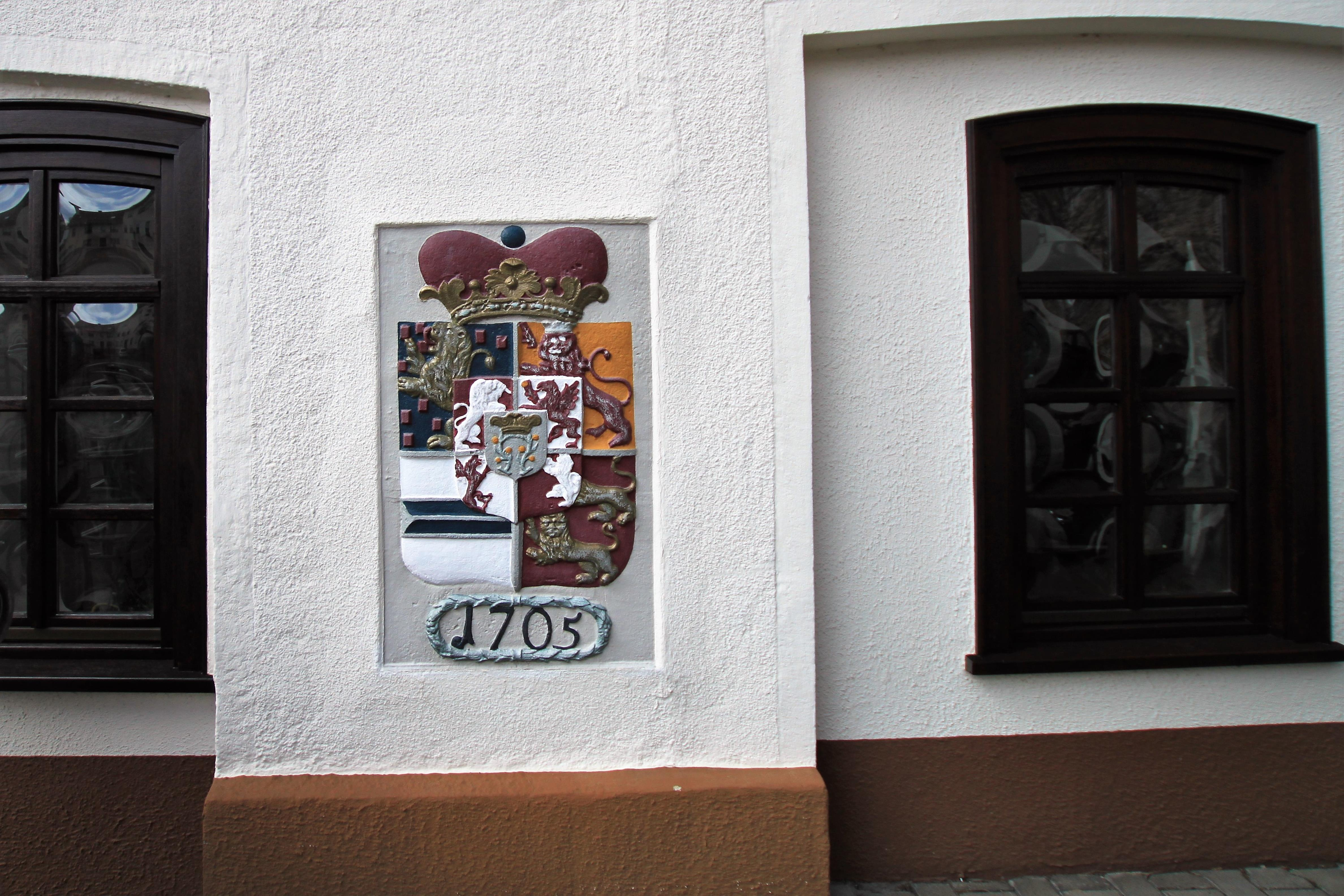
Quarterly, I Azure billetty a lion rampant Or (for Nassau); II Or a lion rampant guardant Gules crowned Azure (Katzenelnbogen); III Gules a fess Argent (Vianden), IV Gules two lions passant guardant Or, armed and langued azure (Dietz); overall an inescutcheon on the fess point, 1 and 4, gules a lion rampant or holding in right a spear or, 2 and 3, argent a griffin gules rampant in the right a nut or; in the center of that in the fess point, azure an apple tree with fruit or all under a coronet, or.

=== Kings of the Netherlands (House of Orange-Nassau) ===
When William VI of Orange returned to the Netherlands in 1813 and was proclaimed Sovereign Prince of the Netherlands, he quartered the former Arms of the Dutch Republic (1st and 4th quarter) with the "Châlon-Orange" arms (2nd and 3rd quarter), which had come to symbolize Orange (see above). As an in escutcheon he placed his ancestral arms of Nassau. When he became King in 1815, he combined the Dutch Republic Lion with the billets of the Nassau arms and added a royal crown to form the Coat of arms of the Netherlands. In 1907, Queen Wilhelmina replaced the royal crown on the lion and the shield bearers of the arms with a coronet.

Wilhelmina further decreed that in perpetuity her descendants should be styled "princes and princesses of Orange-Nassau" and that the name of the house would be "Orange-Nassau" (in Dutch "Oranje-Nassau"). Only those members of the members of the Dutch Royal Family that are designated to the smaller "Royal House" can use the title of prince or princess of the Netherlands (according to the Membership to the Royal House Act which was revised in 2002.) Since then, individual members of the House of Orange-Nassau are also given their own arms by the reigning monarch, similar to the United Kingdom. This is usually the royal arms, quartered with the arms of the principality of Orange, and an in escutcheon of their paternal arms.

The Royal House of the Netherlands tends to use Heraldic flags more extensively than their arms. So these are also shown here.

Achievement
Arms
Heraldic Flag
Name and blazon

After 1907:

(1908–2013)

(2013 – )

William I of the Netherlands (1772–1843), prince of Orange, King of the Netherlands, duke and grand duke of Luxembourg (until 1890, when Luxembourg went by treaty and family compact to Duke Adolph of Nassau), & etc.

Coat of arms of the Netherlands:

Azure billetty or, a lion rampant Or, crowned with a closed royal crown and armed and langued or holding in his dexter paw a sword Argent hilted Or and in the sinister paw seven arrows Argent pointed and tight together or. Supporters: two lions guardant Or armed and langued Gules, wearing the royal crown. Mantle: gules lined with Ermine. Above the mantle is a pavilion gules again topped with the royal crown. Motto: Je Maintiendrai (pronounced [ʒə mɛ̃.tjɛ̃.dʁe], old French for "I shall maintain").

- Arms borne by:
  - William II of the Netherlands (1792–1849), son of the preceding,
  - William III of the Netherlands (1817–1890), son of the preceding,
  - Wilhelmina of the Netherlands (1880–1962), daughter of the preceding,

In 1907, Queen Wilhelmina simplfied the arms: the lion was now represented with an open crown. The two lion supporters were represented rampant and without a crown.

Azure billetty or, a lion rampant Or, crowned with a coronet and armed and langued or holding in his dexter paw a sword Argent hilted Or and in the sinister paw seven arrows Argent pointed and tight together or. On top of the shield is the royal crown of the Netherlands. Supporters: two lions rampant Or armed and langued Gules. Mantle: gules lined with Ermine. Above the mantle is a pavilion gules again topped with the royal crown. Motto: Je Maintiendrai (pronounced [ʒə mɛ̃.tjɛ̃.dʁe], old French for "I shall maintain"). (In the royal decree, it is stated that male successors may replace the crown on the shield with a helm with the crest of Nassau.)

- Armes portées ensuite par:
  - Wilhelmina of the Netherlands, Queen (1890–1948)
  - Juliana of the Netherlands, Queen, daughter of the preceding (1948–1980)
  - Beatrix of the Netherlands, Queen, daughter of the preceding (1980–2013)
  - William-Alexander of the Netherlands, King, son of the preceding (2013 – )

Crown Prince of the Netherlands (prince of Orange) in the XIX^{th} century

Quarterly: I & IV: Azure Azure billetty or, a lion rampant Or, crowned with a closed royal crown and armed and langued or holding in his dexter paw a sword Argent hilted Or and in the sinister paw seven arrows Argent pointed and tight together or (Netherlands), and II & III: quarterly I and IV Gules, a bend Or (Châlons); II and III Or a bugle horn Azure, stringed Gules (Orange) with an inescutcheon, Nine pieces Or and Azure (Geneva).

his eldest son the hereditary prince of the Netherlands:

the same, with a label gueules.

- Arms also borne by:
  - William II of the Netherlands (1792–1849), son of William I,
  - William III of the Netherlands (1817–1890), son of the preceding,
  - William, Prince of Orange, (1840–1879), son of the preceding,
  - Alexander, Prince of Orange, (1851–1884), brother of the preceding,

Wilhelmine of Prussia, Queen of the Netherlands (1774–1837), queen consort of King William I of the Netherlands, daughter of King Frederick William II of Prussia.

Per pale, 1. the arms of the Netherlands as above, 2. argent, an eagle sable beaked, and membered or, languled gueles, crowned with a royal crown (closed), on each wing a trefoil half-circle or, on the chest the digit FR, also the eagle holding from its dexter talon a scepter of gold carrying on its top an eagle sable, and in its sinister talon an orb azure, arched and with a cross on top or.

Prince Frederick of the Netherlands (1797–1881), son of King William I of the Netherlands

Azure Azure billetty or, a lion rampant Or, crowned with a closed royal crown and armed and langued or holding in his dexter paw a sword Argent hilted Or and in the sinister paw seven arrows Argent pointed and tight together or overall a label gueules in the center point an arrow argent.

Louise of the Netherlands (1828† 1871), princess of the Netherlands, Queen consort of Sweden and Norway (8 July 1859 – 18 September 1872), daughter of Prince Frederick of the Netherlands

1850, per pale in 1 or the head of a griffon gueules crowned and langued or (Scania) and 2 Azure Azure billetty or, a lion rampant Or, crowned with a closed royal crown and armed and langued or holding in his dexter paw a sword Argent hilted Or and in the sinister paw seven arrows Argent pointed and tight together or.

1859, per pale, a 1 and 3: a shield azure, quartered by a demi-cross Or with outbent arms (of St. Eric), in 1 party per fesse or, cantoned in the chief azur, three open crowns Or, placed two above one (Sweden Modern); in 3 three sinister bendwise streams argent, a lion crowned with an open crown Or armed gules (House of Bjälbo), in 2 Gules, a lion rampant Or, crowned Or, holding an axe Or with a blade argent (Norway), sur-le-tout Azure billetty or, a lion rampant Or, crowned with a closed royal crown and armed and langued or holding in his dexter paw a sword Argent hilted Or and in the sinister paw seven arrows Argent pointed and tight together or Netherlands.

Princess Marie of the Netherlands (1841 + 1910) married William, Prince of Wied and mother of Wied, Prince of Albania, King of Albania. Daughter of Prince Frederick of the Netherlands.

Princess Marianne of the Netherlands (1810–1883), daughter of King William I of the Netherlands, married her first cousin Prince Albert, the fourth son of her mother's brother, King Frederick William III of Prussia. The union produced five children

Azure Azure billetty or, a lion rampant Or, crowned with a closed royal crown and armed and langued or holding in his dexter paw a sword Argent hilted Or and in the sinister paw seven arrows Argent pointed and tight together or, overall a label gueules on the center point a royal crown of the Netherlands or.

Anna Pavlovna of Russia (1795–1865), queen consort of King William II of the Netherlands, daughter of Emperor Paul I of Russia.

Or, a double headed eagle sable, beaked, langued, and members Gules each head surmounted by an imperial Russian crown or and argent, and between the heads of the eagle an imperial Russian crown of or and argent, holding from its dexter talon a scepter of gold and its sinister talon a world orb of the same. On the chest of the eagle the arms of Moscow: a horseman with a spear in his hand slaying a basilisk Saint George and the Dragon.

Sophie of Württemberg (1818–1877), Queen Consort of the Netherlands, wife of King William III of the Netherlands

Per pale I. the arms of the kingdom of the Netherlands as above, II. the arms of Württemberg per pale 1. or, three black stag's antlers of 4 branches each Württemberg, 2. on the dexter or three black lions passant medieval Swabia on the sinister.

Emma of Waldeck and Pyrmont (1854–1934), Queen Consort of the Netherlands, Regent of the Netherlands (1890–1898)

Per pale two parts cut from two others which make nine-quarters in total: on the 5th or, a star of (8) points sable (Waldeck), in 1 and 9 argent a cross anchored gules (Pyrmont), in 2 and 8 argent three escutcheons gules (Rappoltstein), in 3 and 7 argent three raven heads sable langued gules and crowned or (Hoheneck), in 4th azure a lion rampant crowned with a cornet or langued gules and 6th argent semmee billets azure a lion gules crowned with a cornet or over all (both 4th and 6th for Geroldseck), mantel of purple fringed and stuffed with gold lined with ermine surmounted by a princely crown.

*

Duke Henry of Mecklenburg-Schwerin (1876–1934), prince consort of the Netherlands

Quarterly, 1. the arms of the Netherlands as above, 2. or, a bull's head sable, languled gules, teeth, horns and eye argent, and crowned in the color of the field Mecklenburg, 3. party per fesse gules and or, 4. azure, a griffon or.

==== House of Orange-Nassau, princess of Mecklenburg-Schwerin ====
Achievement
Arms
Heraldic Flag
Name and blazon

as a princess:

Juliana of the Netherlands, Queen of the Netherlands (1948–1980), princess of Orange-Nassau, duchess of Mecklemburg-Schwerin, countess of Nassau.

as Crown Princess and Princess of Orange;

Quarterly: 1 and 4:Azure billetty or, a lion rampant Or, crowned with a coronet and armed and langued or holding in his dexter paw a sword Argent hilted Or and in the sinister paw seven arrows Argent pointed and tight together or (the arms of the Netherlands); 2 and 3: or, a hunting horn, azure, wrapped and banded in a ribbon gueules (Orange), on an inescutcheon at the fess point, or, a bull's head sable, languled gules, teeth, horns and eye argent, and crowned in the color of the field Mecklenburg.

as Queen (1948–1980):

Azure billetty or, a lion rampant Or, crowned with a coronet and armed and langued or holding in his dexter paw a sword Argent hilted Or and in the sinister paw seven arrows Argent pointed and tight together or.

after her abdication (1980–2004), she used her arms like a princess above.

Prince Bernhard of the Netherlands (1911–2004), prince of Lippe -Beisterfeld, prince consort of the Netherlands 1948 – 1980

Quarterly: 1 and 4:Azure billetty or, a lion rampant Or, crowned with a coronet and armed and langued or holding in his dexter paw a sword Argent hilted Or and in the sinister paw seven arrows Argent pointed and tight together or (the arms of the Netherlands); 2. argent, a rose gueles, it center and barbed or Lippe, 3. gueles, an (8) pointed start, surmounted by a swallow (or a magpie) natural (Schwalenburg).

==== House of Orange-Nassau, princess of Lippe-Biesterfeld ====
Achievement
Arms
Heraldic Flag
Name and blazon

Beatrix of the Netherlands, Queen of the Netherlands (1980–2013), princesse of Orange-Nassau, princess of Lippe-Biesterfeld

Crown Princess/Princess of Orange:

Quarterly: 1 and 4:Azure billetty or, a lion rampant Or, crowned with a coronet and armed and langued or holding in his dexter paw a sword Argent hilted Or and in the sinister paw seven arrows Argent pointed and tight together or (the arms of the Netherlands); 2 and 3: or, a hunting horn, azure, wrapped and banded in a ribbon gueules (Orange), on an inescutcheon at the fess point, argent, a rose gueles, it center and barbed or (Lippe).

As Queen (1980–2013):

Azure billetty or, a lion rampant Or, crowned with a coronet and armed and langued or holding in his dexter paw a sword Argent hilted Or and in the sinister paw seven arrows Argent pointed and tight together or (the arms of the Netherlands).

after her abdication (2013), she used her arms like a princess.

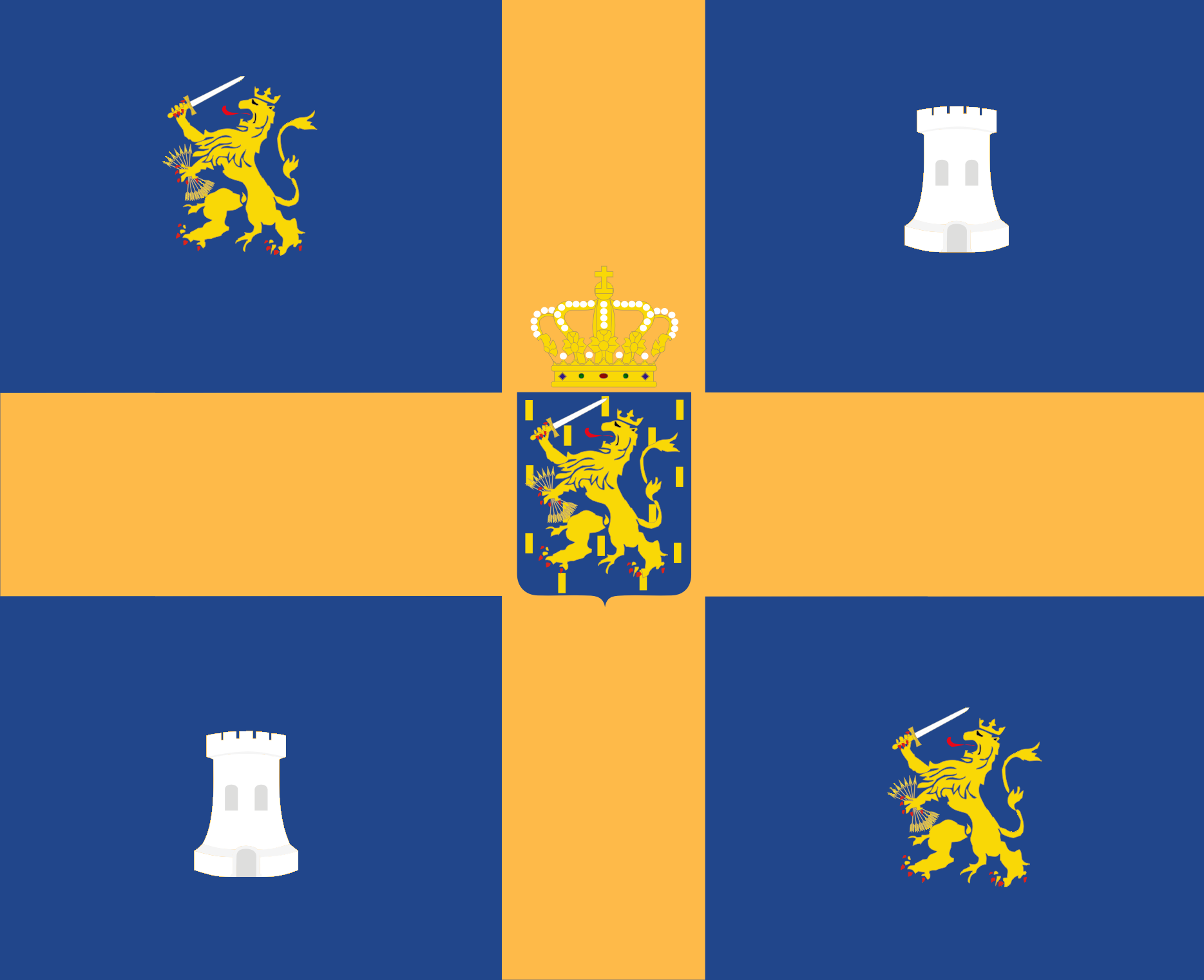
Claus von Amsberg (1926–2002) Jonkheer van Amsberg, prince consort of the Netherlands, prince of the Netherlands

Quarterly: 1 and 4:Azure billetty or, a lion rampant Or, crowned with a coronet and armed and langued or holding in his dexter paw a sword Argent hilted Or and in the sinister paw seven arrows Argent pointed and tight together or (the arms of the Netherlands), 2 and 3: vert a castle argent on top of a mountain or (Amsberg).

Princesses Irene, Margriet et Christina, princesses of Orange-Nassau, princesses of Lippe-Biesterfeld.

Quarterly: 1 and 4:Azure billetty or, a lion rampant Or, crowned with a coronet and armed and langued or holding in his dexter paw a sword Argent hilted Or and in the sinister paw seven arrows Argent pointed and tight together or (the arms of the Netherlands); 2 and 3: or, a hunting horn, azure, wrapped and banded in a ribbon gueules (Orange), on an inescutcheon at the fess point, argent, a rose gueles, it center and barbed or (Lippe).

Princesses Irene and Christina converted to Catholicism on their marriage. They thus lost their place in the royal house as princesses of the Netherlands, and their children are not considered members of the house of Orange-Nassau.

Prince Maurits of Orange-Nassau, van Vollenhoven, Prince Bernhard of Orange-Nassau, van Vollenhoven, Prince Pieter-Christiaan of Orange-Nassau, van Vollenhoven, and Prince Floris of Orange-Nassau, van Vollenhoven, princes of Orange-Nassau, princes of Lippe-Biesterfeld, sons of princesse Margriet and Pieter van Vollenhoven

Quarterly: 1 and 4:Azure billetty or, a lion rampant Or, crowned with a coronet and armed and langued or holding in his dexter paw a sword Argent hilted Or and in the sinister paw seven arrows Argent pointed and tight together or (the arms of the Netherlands); 2 and 3: or, a hunting horn, azure, wrapped and banded in a ribbon gueules (Orange), on an inescutcheon at the fess point per pale I: azure, a white six-pointed star, II: or, a red stag facing dexter against a tree vert (van Vollenhoven).

Arms of van Vollenhoven:

==== House of Orange-Nassau, Jonkheere van Amsberg (van Orange-Nassau van Amsberg) ====
Achievement
Arms
Heraldic Flag
Name and blazon

King William-Alexander of the Netherlands, King of the Netherlands (2013), Prince of Orange-Nassau, Jonkheer van Amsberg

Quarterly: 1 and 4:Azure billetty or, a lion rampant Or, crowned with a coronet and armed and langued or holding in his dexter paw a sword Argent hilted Or and in the sinister paw seven arrows Argent pointed and tight together or (the arms of the Netherlands); 2 and 3: or, a hunting horn, azure, wrapped and banded in a ribbon gueules (Orange), on an inescutcheon at the fess point, vert a castle argent on top of a mountain or (Amsberg).

as King of the Netherlands:

Azure billetty or, a lion rampant Or, crowned with a coronet and armed and langued or holding in his dexter paw a sword Argent hilted Or and in the sinister paw seven arrows Argent pointed and tight together or (the arms of the Netherlands).

For Maxima as Princess or the Netherlands and her daughters:

Queen Maxima of the Netherlands, Queen consort of the Netherlands (2013), and

Princesses Catherine-Amalia, princesse of Orange, (2003–) Princess Alexia of the Netherlands and Princess Ariane of the Netherlands, princesses of the Netherlands and Orange-Nassau, jonkvrouwe van Amsberg,

Quarterly: 1 and 4:Azure billetty or, a lion rampant Or, crowned with a coronet and armed and langued or holding in his dexter paw a sword Argent hilted Or and in the sinister paw seven arrows Argent pointed and tight together or (the arms of the Netherlands); 2 and 3: or, a hunting horn, azure, wrapped and banded in a ribbon gueules (Orange), on an inescutcheon at the fess point, vert a castle gueles with three portals on top of a mountain azure with two cyprus trees vert with two wolves black facing the two cyprus trees (Zorreguieta).

House of Orange-Nassau van Amsberg see also House of Amsberg. "Van Orange-Nassau van Amsberg" is the name of the title as count or countess in the Netherlands that the members carry after 2002 that are not also princes of the Netherlands. The other title is Jonkheer(or Jonkvrouw) van Amsberg.

Princes Willem-Alexander, prince of Orange, (1962–2013) Friso and Constantin des Pays-Bas, princes of the Netherlands, princes of Orange-Nassau, Jonkheere van Amsberg,

Quarterly: 1 and 4:Azure billetty or, a lion rampant Or, crowned with a coronet and armed and langued or holding in his dexter paw a sword Argent hilted Or and in the sinister paw seven arrows Argent pointed and tight together or (the arms of the Netherlands); 2 and 3: or, a hunting horn, azure, wrapped and banded in a ribbon gueules (Orange), on an inescutcheon at the fess point, vert a castle argent on top of a mountain or (Amsberg).

Arms borne by:

the children of Prince Friso of Orange-Nassau:

- Countess Emma Luana Ninette Sophie of Orange-Nassau, Jonkvrouwe van Amsberg, born 26 March 2005;
- Countess Joanna Zaria Nicoline Milou of Orange-Nassau, Jonkvrouwe van Amsberg, was born 18 June 2006.

the children of Prince Constantijn of the Netherlands:

- Eloise, Countess of Orange-Nassau van Amsberg, born 8 June 2002;
- Claus-Casimir, Count of Orange-Nassau van Amsberg, born 21 March 2004;
- Leonore, Countess of Orange-Nassau van Amsberg, born 3 June 2006.

Princess Laurentien of the Netherlands (1966– ) wife of Prince Constantijn of the Netherlands

party per fesse or and sable, in the chief three lozenges sable (Brinkhorst).

== External links and sources ==
- Johannes Rietstap: Rietstap, Johannes Baptist (2003). Armorial general (in French). Vol. 2. Genealogical Publishing Co. ISBN 9780806304427.
- Johannes Rietstap: Rietstap, Johannes Baptist (1861). Armorial général, contenant la description des armoiries des familles nobles et patriciennes de l'Europe: précédé d'un dictionnaire des termes du blason (in French). G.B. van Goor.
- Johannes Rietstap: "On-line Armorial de J.B. RIETSTAP – et ses Compléments" (in French). Archived from the original on 9 December 2011.
- Johannes Rietstap: Rietstap, Johannes Baptist (1875). Handboek der Wapenkunde (in Dutch). the Netherlands: Theod. Bom. p. 348.
- Junius, J.H. (1894). Heraldiek (in Dutch). the Netherlands: Frederik Muller. p. 151.
- John Pinches: Pinches, John Harvey; Pinches, Rosemary (1974), The Royal Heraldry of England, Heraldry Today, Slough, Buckinghamshire: Hollen Street Press, pp. 191–192, ISBN 0-900455-25-X
- Herbert H. Rowen, The princes of Orange: the stadholders in the Dutch Republic. Cambridge and New York: Cambridge University Press, 1988.
- Herbert H. Rowen, The princes of Orange: the stadholders in the Dutch Republic. Cambridge and New York: Cambridge University Press, 2003.
- Pieter Geyl, "Orange and Stuart, 1641–1672". Scribner, 1970.
- Rijksvoorlichtingsdienst (RVD) (ed.). "Wapens van leden van het Koninklijk Huis" [Coats of Arms of the Dutch Royal Family, Website of the Dutch Monarchy, the Hague] (in Dutch). the Hague, the Netherlands. Archived from the original on 23 January 2013.
- La Cour grand-ducale (ed.). "Cour de Grand-Ducale de Luxembourg: Armoiries" (in French). Luxembourg City, Luxembourg.
- Browse this armorial on the website of the KB nationale bibliotheek:
  - Background information about this armorial in Dutch on the website of the KB.
  - This armorial was presumably commissioned by Engelbrecht II of Nassau (1451–1504). After him it was possibly owned by William I, Prince of Orange (William the Silent) (1533–1584) and Jacques Wijts (ca. 1579–1643). In 1898 the manuscripts is known to be in the library of the German graphical artist Otto Hupp ("O.H. 1898" in the bottom right corner of the binding).
  - The original limp parchment binding is from circa 1500. Inside it shows the coat of arms of William of Orange and an annotation from the 17th century stating Ick hoir toe den capitain Vits.
- À propos… des armoiries de S.A.R. le Grand-Duc de Luxembourg sur le site gouvernemental luxembourgeois,
- Nassau sur heraldique-europeenne.org,
- "European Heraldry, House of Nassau".
- "European Heraldry, Netherlands". Archived from the original on 4 June 2019.
- "web.genealogie.free.fr" (in French). Archived from the original on 23 September 2007.,
