= Louis of Nassau, Lord of De Lek and Beverweerd =

Dutch soldier

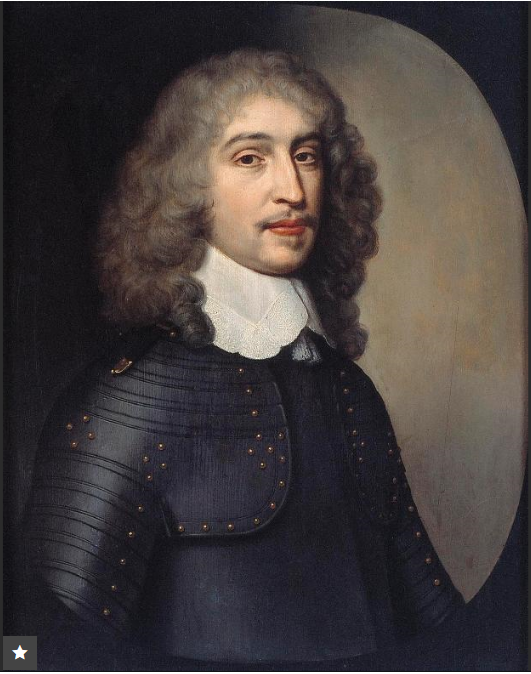
Portrait of Louis of Nassau, Lord of den Lek and Beverweerd (1602-1665) about 1650.

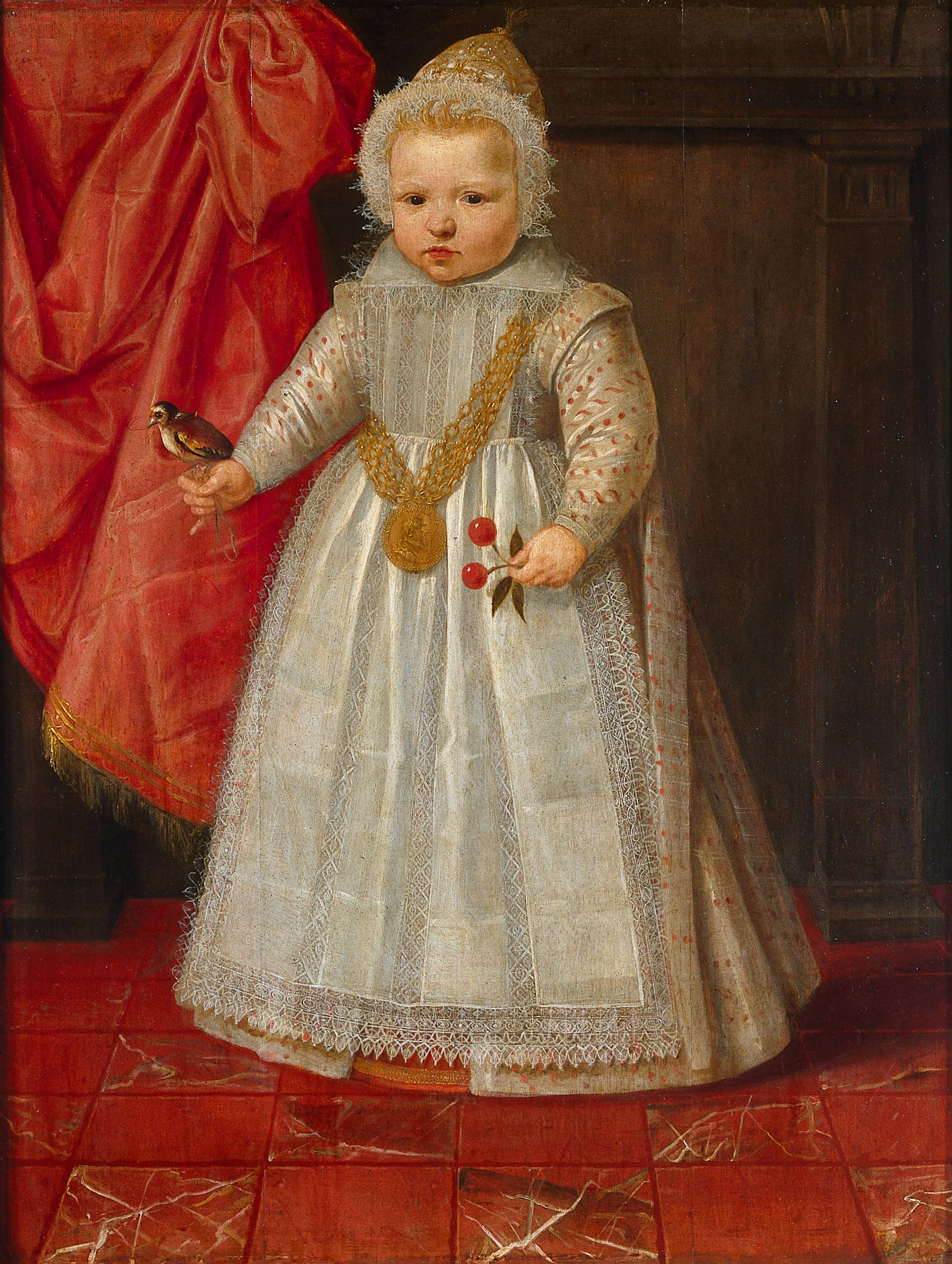
Louis at 18 months of age in 1604, by Daniël van den Queborn, 1604/5

Arms of Louis of Lecke, Lord of Beverweerd.

Louis of Nassau, Lord of De Lek and Beverweerd (1602 – The Hague, 28 February 1665) was a Dutch soldier. He was the illegitimate son of Margaretha van Mechelen and Maurice, Prince of Orange, and so a collateral member of the House of Orange-Nassau. He was a Lord of the heerlijkheid van De Lek (which he inherited on the death of his older brother, William of Nassau on his death in 1627), as well as the Beverweerd Castle and its heerlijkheid from his father.

== Career ==
He joined the army which had claimed his brother William's life and served with distinction in 1629 in the battle near Den Bosch. In 1632 he was advanced to Colonel and after 1635 was in charge of a regiment. In 1640 during the battle for Hulst, he prevented the cannons from falling into enemy hands. In the same year he was sent to Paris to advise the French king of the forthcoming marriage of the 14-year-old William II of Orange to the 9-year-old English Princess Mary Stuart. Also, when the young Prince proceeded to England to fetch his bride, he was accompanied by Louis of Nassau. In 1643 he became General-Major and Governor of the city of Bergen-op-Zoom.

Despite his mother's objections, he married Isabella van Hornes in the spring of 1630 and from this marriage, ten children were born. His uncle, Prince Frederick Henry, highly regarded Lodewijk, and participated in the Prince's family life.

Louis was originally a supporter of his next of kin, the Princes of Orange. After the death of William II he made his peace with the anti-Orangist regents of the cities of the Dutch Republic and worked with the administration of Johan de Witt, becoming First Noble of Holland. In 1658 Louis of Nassau became Governor of Den Bosch and in 1660 was sent as a special ambassador to England. In addition to his representing the Dutch Republic, two of his daughters married British noblemen. Isabella married Henry Bennet, 1st Earl of Arlington, one of King Charles II's ministers; and Emilia married Thomas Butler, 6th Earl of Ossory, the heir apparent of the Duke of Ormond. By 1662 Louis had forged a strong relationship between England and the Dutch Republic and returned to Holland where he died on 28 February 1665.

== Marriage and children ==
He married Countess Isabella of Hornes in the spring of 1630, and had ten children.

He and Countess Isabella of Hornes had three surviving sons:

- Maurits Lodewijk I, Lord of De Lek (or La Lecq) and Beverweerd
- Willem Adriaan I, Lord of Odijk, Kortgene, Zeist and Driebergen
- Hendrik, Lord of Ouwerkerk and Woudenberg

He also had seven daughters of whom the three eldest were:

- Isabella van Nassau-Beverweert (28 December 1633 – 18 January 1718), sometimes recorded as Elisabeth, a notable Dutch beauty, who married March 1665 Henry Bennet, 1st Earl of Arlington and had an only daughter
  - Lady Isabella Bennet (c. 1668–7 February 1723) who married 1 August 1672 as a four-year-old child Henry Fitzroy, 1st Duke of Grafton (28 September 1663 – 9 October 1690 d. at the storming of Cork), the illegitimate son of King Charles II of England and his mistress the Duchess of Cleveland. They have many descendants.
- Emilia Butler, Countess of Ossory, a notable beauty like her sister. She was wife of Thomas Butler, Earl of Ossory, and mother of the 2nd Duke of Ormonde and other children.
- Wilhelmina Anna, married the Dutch noble Albert Willemsz van Ruytenburgh (1630-1688), son of Willem van Ruytenburch, and had a daughter Anna Elisabeth van Ruytenbergh who married George Cholmondeley, 2nd Earl of Cholmondeley in 1701.

Louis of Nassau died in The Hague and was buried there, 6 March 1665, in de Great, or St. James Church. His descendants are buried in the family crypt at Ouderkerk aan den IJssel.

Family tree of the House of Nassau-den Lek

William I "the Silent" (1533–1584); Prince of Orange 1544, Stadholder of Holland, Zealand & Utrecht
Margaretha van Mechelen (c. 1580 – 1662)	Maurice of Nassau; Prince of Orange (1567–1625); Prince of Orange; 1618, Stadholder of Holland, Zealand, Utrecht, etc.
William of Nassau (1601–1627) "Chevalier de Nassau"; Lord of de Lek	Louis of Nassau (1602– 1665); Lord of De Lek and Beverweerd	Isabella van Hornes
Willem Jonker van Nassau (1620–1679)	Maurits Lodewijk van Nassau (1631–1683); Lord of den Lecq	William Adrian of Nassau (1632–1705); Lord of Odijk	Elisabeth of Nassau (1633–1718) married Henry Bennet, Earl of Arlington	Emilia (1635–1688) married Thomas Butler, 6th Earl of Ossory	Wilhelmina (c. 1638 – 1688) married Aelbert van Ruytenburgh	Henry of Nassau (1640– 1708); Lord of Ouwerkerk; Count of Nassau, 1679; Master of the Horse to William III of England
William of Nassau (1654-)	Barbara of Nassau (1659-)	Alida of Nassau (1661-)	John of Nassau (1663-)	Maurits Lodewijk of Nassau (1670–1740); Lord of den Lek	Lodewijk Adriaan of Nassau (1670–1742); Lord of Odijk	Elisabeth Wilhelmina of Nassau (1671–1729) married her cousin Maurits Lodewijk II van Nassau-LaLecq	Charlotte of Nassau (1677–1715) married her cousin Willem Maurits van Nassau-Ouwerkerk	Isabella of Nassau (1668–1692) married Charles Granville, Earl of Bath	Lodewijk van Nassau (1669–1687)	Lucia van Nassau (1671–1673)	Henry of Nassau (1673–1754); Earl of Grantham	Cornelis van Nassau (1675–1712); Lord of Woudenberg	Willem Maurits van Nassau (1679–1753); Lord of Ouwerkerk married his cousin Charlotte of Nassau	Frans van Nassau (1682–1710)	Lucia Anna van Nassau (1684–1744) married Nanfan Coote, Earl of Bellomont
Willem Hendrik van Nassau (1693–1762); Lord of Ouderkerk	Anna Isabella van Nassau; 1695–1765) married Mattheus Hoeufft Jr.	Hendrik Carel van Nassau (1696–1781); Lord of Beverweerd and Odijk	Lodewijk Theodoor van Nassau; 1701–1748)	Jan Nicolaas Floris van Nassau (1709–1782); Lord of Ouderkerk	Alida Cornelia van Nassau (1705-170?)	Willem Adriaan II van Nassau (1704–1759); Graaf van Nassau, Lord of Odijk, vrijheer van Bergen (1708)	Henry of Nassau (1697–1718); Viscount Boston; 1698	Thomas of Nassau (1700–1730); Viscount Boston; 1718	Frances of Nassau (1711–1772) married Captain (later Lieutenant-Colonel) William Elliot of Wells	Emilia Mary of Nassau (1702–1712)	Henrietta de Nassau (1712–1747) married William Clavering-Cowper, Earl Cowper	William Henry (1710–1735)	Elisabeth (1712-)	Francoise Henriette (1711-)
Catherina Elisabeth Wilhelmina van Nassau (1736–1777)	Lodewijk Theodoor II van Nassau (1741–1795); Lord of de Lek, Lord of Ouderkerk (1762–1773)	Jan Floris van Nassau (1751–1814); Lord of de Lek, Lord of Ouderkerk	Louise Suzanna van Nassau (1726–1803) married Frederik Christoffel, Graaf van Degenfeld-Schönburg (1721–1781)	Willem Lodewijk van Nassau (1727–1792); Vrijheer van Bergen	Wigbold Adriaan van Nassau (1729–1797); Lord of Odijk, etc. and Vrijheer van Bergen
Jan Floris Hendrik Carel van Nassau (1782–1824); Count of Nassau-la Lecq
