= Van Mechelen =

Van Mechelen is a surname. Notable people with the surname include:

- Clous van Mechelen (born 1941), Dutch musician, arranger, and actor
- Dirk Van Mechelen (born 1957), Belgian Flemish politician
- Margaretha van Mechelen (c. 1580–1662), Dutch noble
- Wouter Van Mechelen (born 1981), Belgian cyclist
