= William of Nassau (1601–1627) =

Dutch soldier

- Issue: William

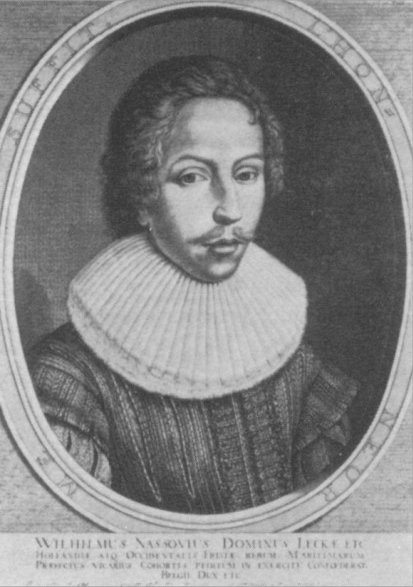
Willem of Nassau, lord of den Lek about 1620.

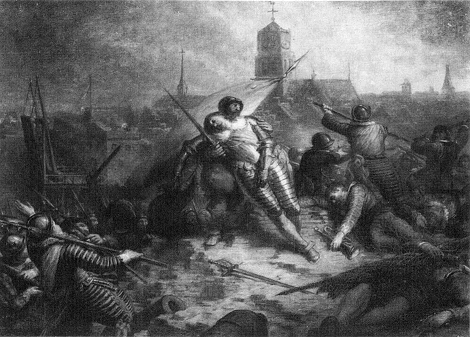
Willem of Nassau, killed at Grol. Jacob van Dijck

Willem van Nassau, Lord of De Lek (also Willem van Nassau-LaLecq, or in French, Willem LaLecq; 18 August 1601 – 18 August 1627) was a Dutch soldier from 1620 until 1627. He was the illegitimate son of stadholder Maurice of Nassau, Prince of Orange and his mistress Margaretha van Mechelen. Like their other illegitimate children, he was recognized with the surname Nassau-LaLecq. He went by the title Rijksgraaf (Count of the Holy Roman Empire) van LaLecq" and was also popularly known in French as the "Chevalier de Nassau". After 1625, he was granted lands and the title Lord of De Lek. He received his heerlijkheid of De Lek as a bequest from his father to him and his descendants. His brother Lodewijk van Nassau had the title "Lord of Beverweerd and Odijk".

From his 19th year on, Willem served in the Dutch army fighting Spain in the Dutch Revolt (1568–1648). Aged only 24 he received the rank of lieutenant-admiral of Holland and West Friesland, replacing stadholder Frederik Hendrik. He led the Dutch ships that participated in the Cádiz expedition of 1625. In the summer of 1627 he was present at the Siege of Grol. On 18 August, not long before the end of the siege, fighting with the French troops at the front, Willem received a bullet wound which later proved fatal. Thus he died on his 26th birthday, with Lodewijk inheriting Willem's fiefdom.

On 4 April 1627, 4 months before his death, Willem married Anna van der Noot, lady of Hoogwoud and Aartswoud, in Sluis. Though he had no children with Anna, he had one illegitimate son by Barbara Augustinus Cocx, Willem Jonker van Nassau (1620–1679) .
