= De Lek =

Coordinates: 51.897469°N 4.715195°E

De Lek was a heerlijkheid (manor) and municipality in the Netherlands, located in the province South Holland. It is named after the Lek River.

Arms of the Heerlijkheid van de Lek

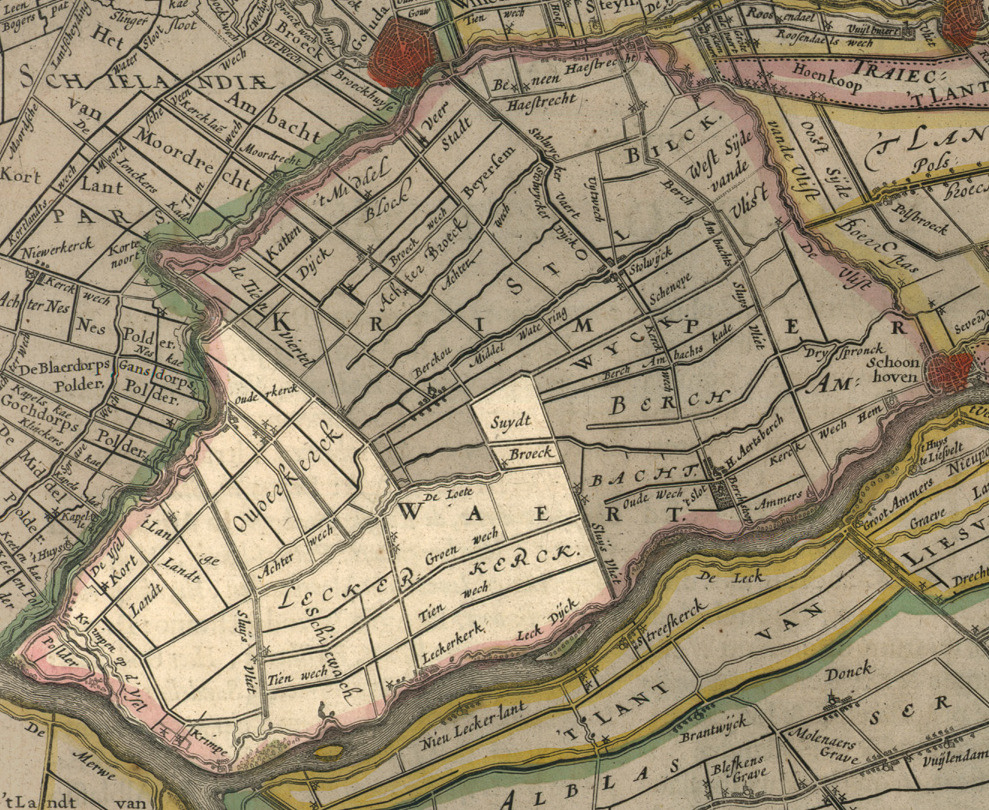
Map of the heerlijkheid from the map of van Blaeu 1645

== Heerlijkheid ==
According to the 19th-century historian Van der Aa, the old Heerlijkheid van de Lek covered the villages of Lekkerkerk, Krimpen aan de Lek, Krimpen aan den IJssel, Ouderkerk aan den IJssel, Berkenwoude and Stormpolder, and possibly Nieuw-Lekkerland. This was a large area east of Rotterdam.

The first Lord of the Lek is reported to be a younger brother of Diederik II of Brederode. After his death around 1063, the heerlijkheid became first a property of the lords of Teylingen, and then of the lords of Polanen. When Engelbert I of Nassau married Johanna van Polanen van der Lekke in 1404, the possession went to the house of Nassau.

After the death of Prince Maurice of Nassau, De Lek was inherited by his illegitimate son William, who called himself Nassau-LaLecq after De Lek. After his death it went to his younger brother, Louis of Nassau, Lord of De Lek and Beverweerd. The last descendant of this family was Jan Floris van Nassau-Lalecq, who died in 1824.

== Municipality ==
Around 1800, the manorial system in the Netherlands was abolished. The villages in the heerlijkheid De Lek became independent municipalities, but small part of the heerlijkheid was excluded and remained a separate municipality, "De Lek". It was only a municipality in name, having no mayor or other municipal services. The municipality covered the river Lek between Ammerstol and Krimpen aan den IJssel, and some islands and surrounding lands. Its area was 5.99 km^{2}, of which 1.24 km^{2} was land, and it contained several small fisherman's huts and boathouses, but it had no inhabitants. In 1847, the territory of De Lek was divided among the surrounding municipalities.

== Links ==
- Heerlijkheid van de Lek(Dutch Wikipedia)
