= William of Nassau (1620–1679) =

Jonker Willem van Nassau-La Lecq (c. 1620 The Hague – buried 21 June 1679, The Hague) was an illegitimate son of Willem of Nassau, lord of the Lek, and Barbara Cox. His father was himself the illegitimate son of Prince Maurice. In 1657 he served as a soldier. Four years later he was a chamberlain. Around 1650 he married Geertruijt Hendriks Mulder (c. 1629–1719).
