= Werkhoven =

- Village
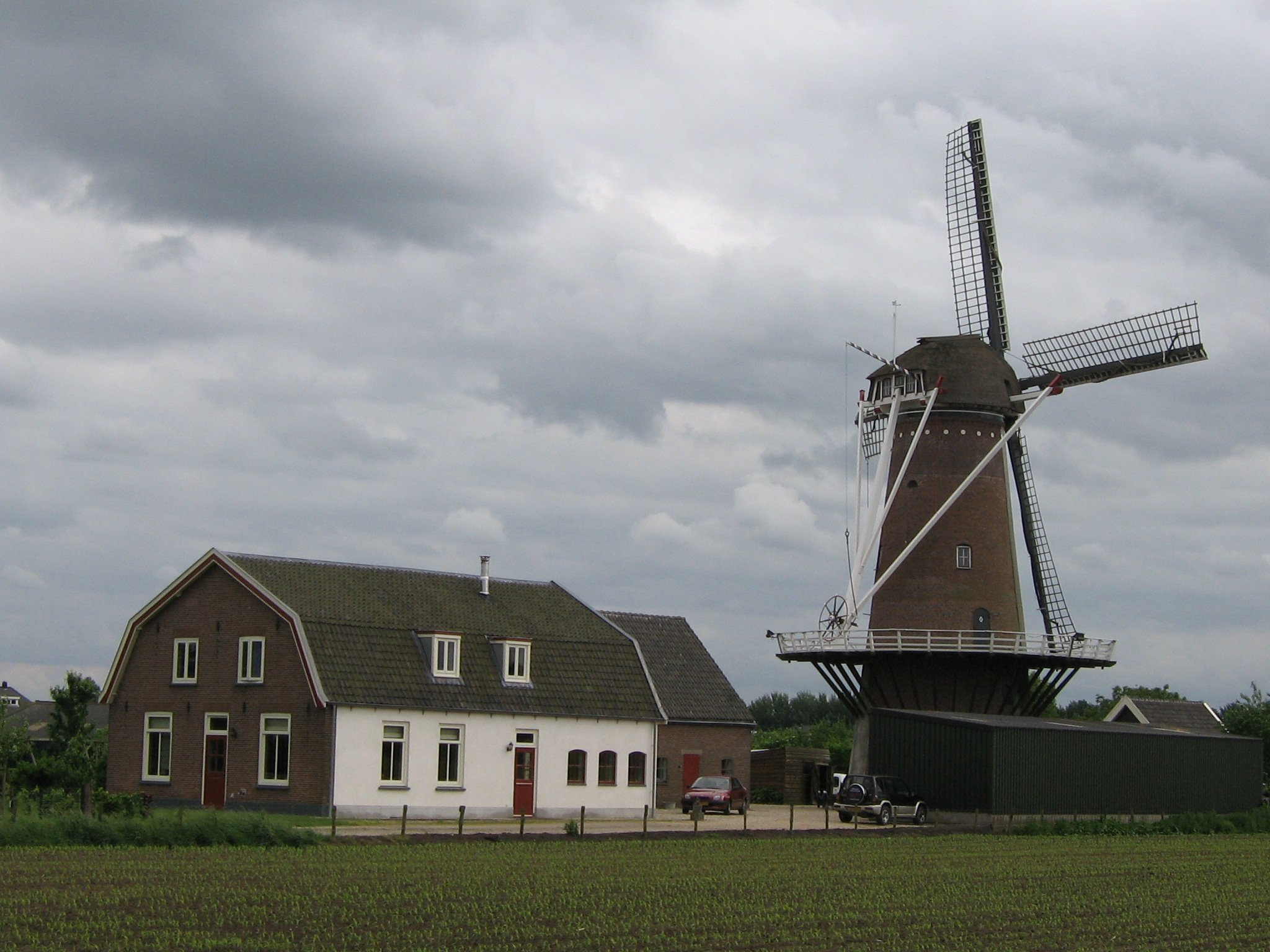
- Windmill near Werkhoven

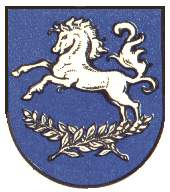
- Coat of arms

- Location in the Netherlands Werkhoven (Netherlands)
- Coordinates: 52°1′26″N 5°14′35″E
- Country: Netherlands
- Province: Utrecht
- Municipality: Bunnik

Area
  - Total: 16.78 km^{2} (6.48 sq mi)
- Elevation: 4 m (13 ft)

Population (2001)
  - Total: 2,550
  - Density: 152/km^{2} (394/sq mi)
- Time zone: UTC+1 (CET)
  - Summer (DST): UTC+2 (CEST)
- Postal code: 3985
- Dialing code: 0343

Werkhoven is a town in the Dutch province of Utrecht. It is a part of the municipality of Bunnik, and lies about 5 km east of Houten. Castle Beverweerd is located on the other side of the river.

Werkhoven used to be a separate municipality. It merged with Bunnik and Odijk in 1964.

== History ==
It was first mentioned between 918 and 948 as "UUerken due", and means farms near a meandering river. Werkhoven developed as a stretch out esdorp along the Achter Rijn. A church has existed since the mid-9th century. The current church dates from the 13th century and was extensively modified in 1830. In 1840, Werkhoven was home to 811 people.

Castle Beverweerd was built on the other side of the river, and was first noted in 1274 when Gijsbrecht IV of Amstel, the Count of Holland attacked Utrecht, and the Prince-Bishopric of Utrecht had to flee. The castle was extended and modified multiple times during its history. In 1958, the castle was sold to the Quakers to be used as a school. The school was later renamed Beverweert International School and operated until 1997. In 2004, the castle was squatted. Since 2017, it is owned by a real estate company.

The grist mill Rijn en Weert was built in 1882. It was a replacement of the wind mill at the castle where a wind mill had been known to exist since 1395. In 1921, an electro motor was installed and the wind mill was reduced to its base. In 1993, the wind mill was restored and returned to active service in 1994.

== Born in Werkhoven ==
- Coby van Baalen (*1957), Dutch equestrian.
- Andreas Everardus van Braam Houckgeest (1739–1801), Dutch merchant and diplomat.
- John Oostrom, (born September 2, 1930), a former business executive and Canadian parliamentarian. He was the first Dutch-born Canadian elected to the Canadian House of Commons

== Pictures ==
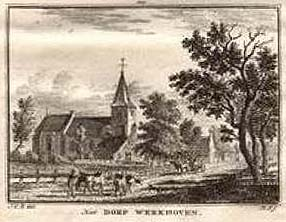
Werkhoven in an engraving by Hendrik Spilman, 1773

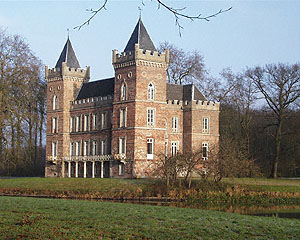
Castle Beverweerd

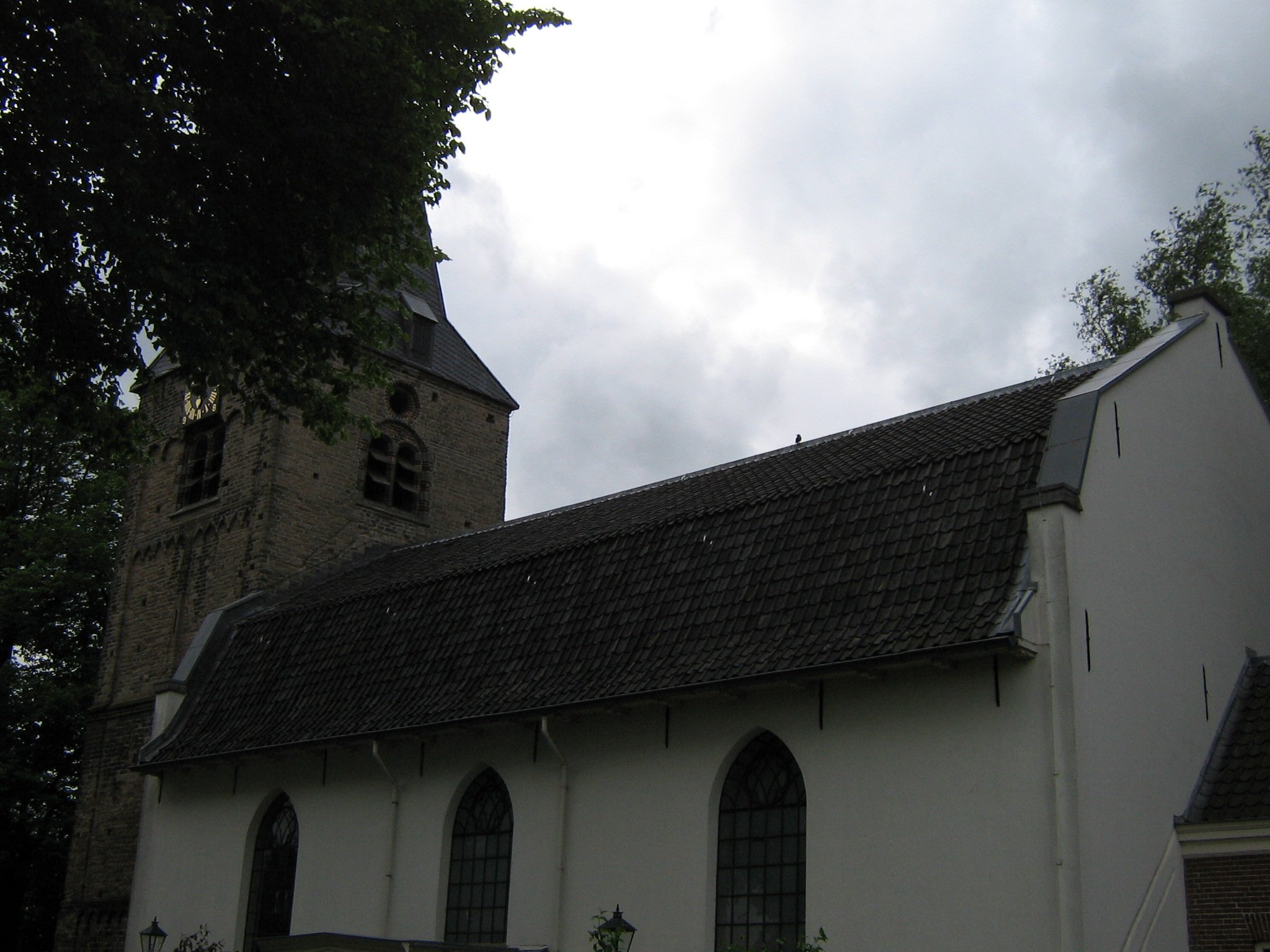
Village church

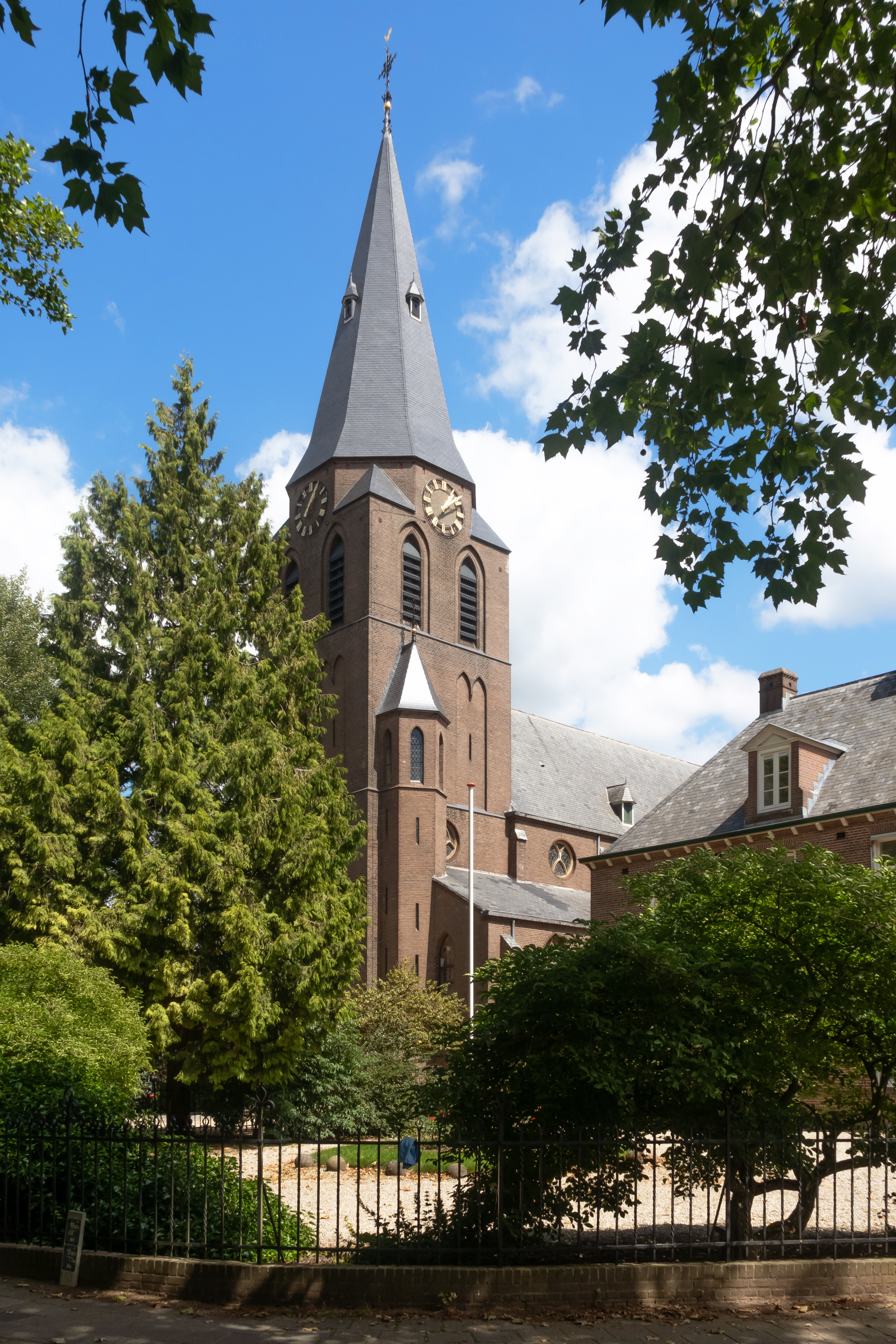
Catholic church

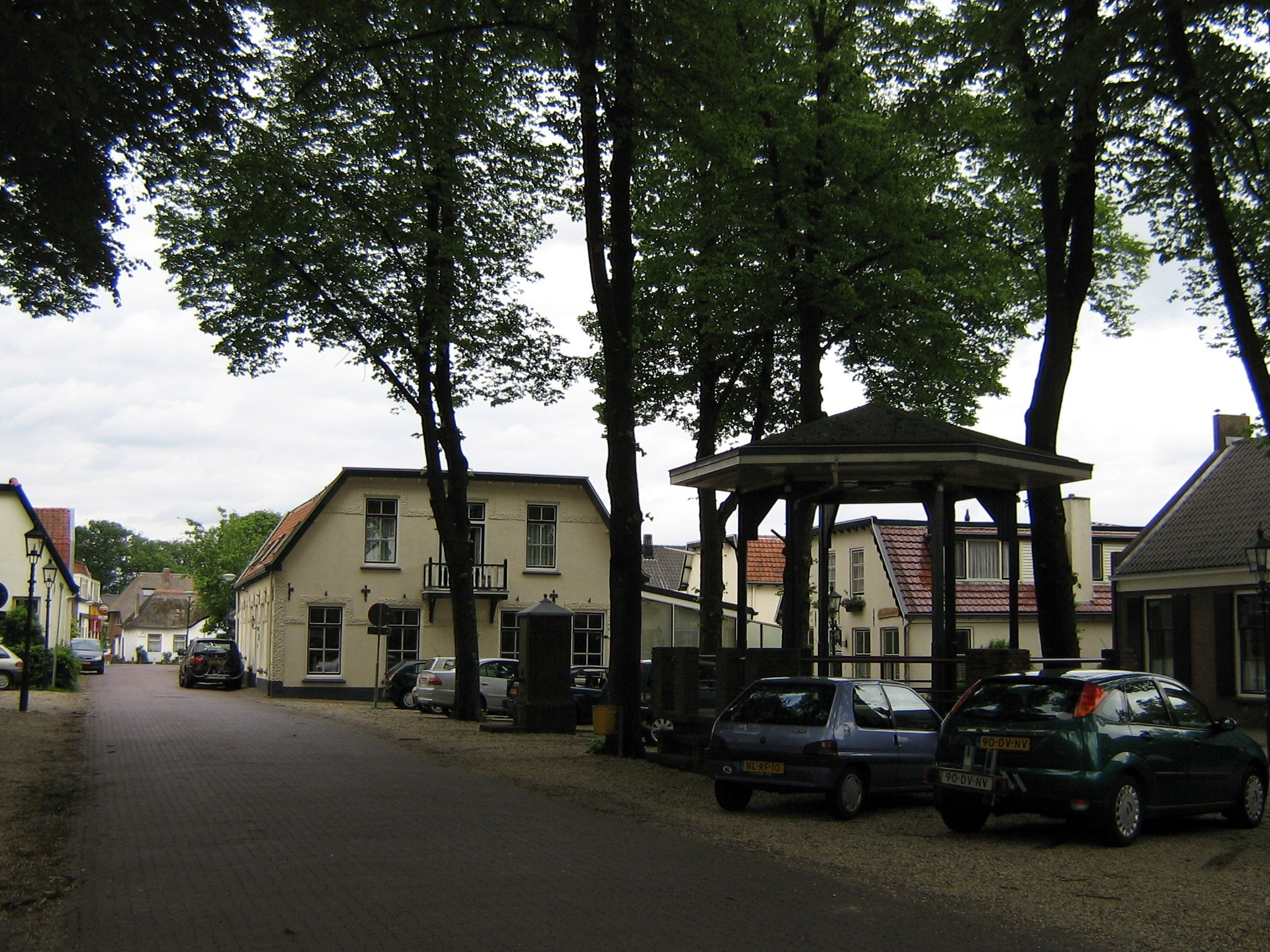
De Brink

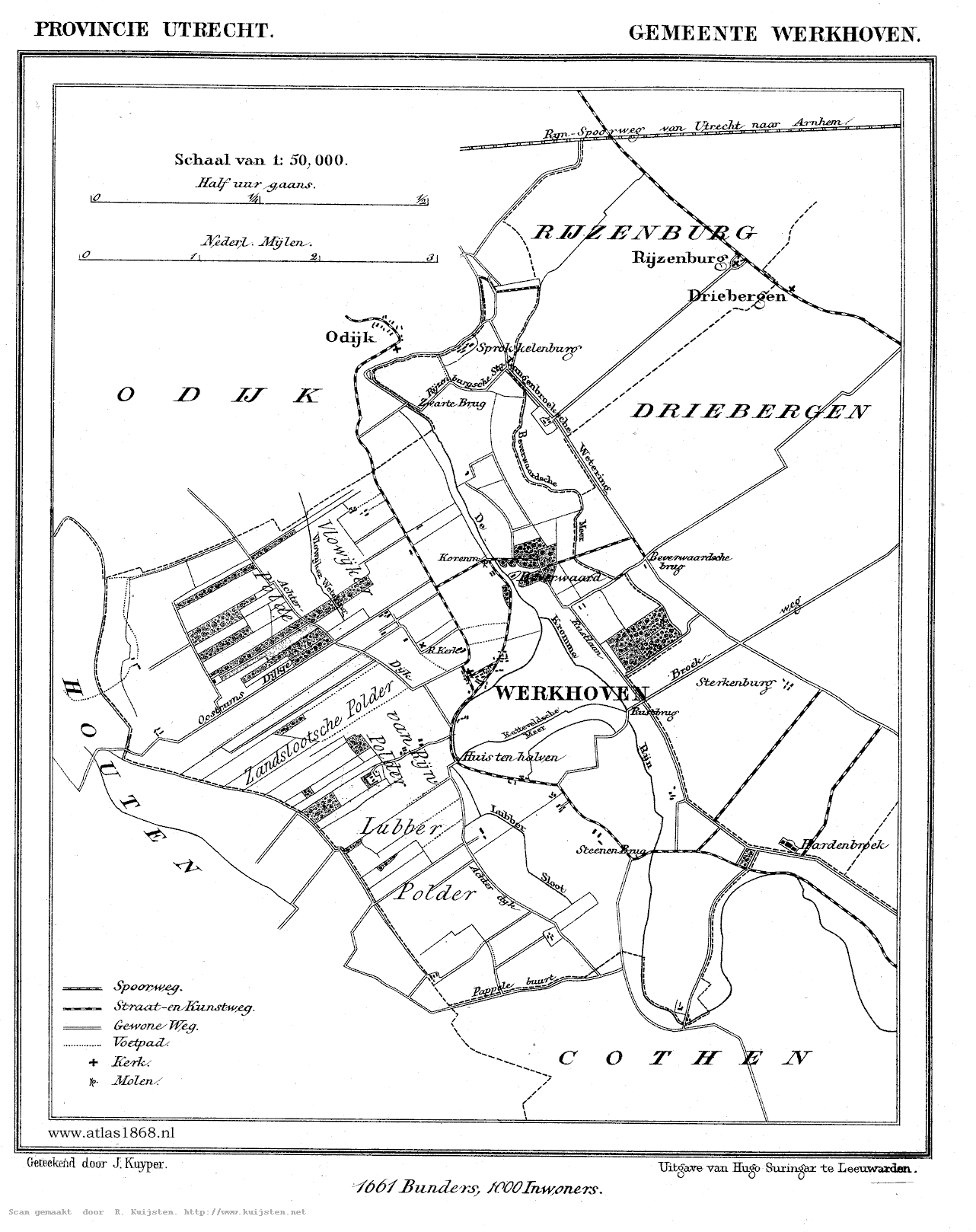
Werkhoven ca. 1865

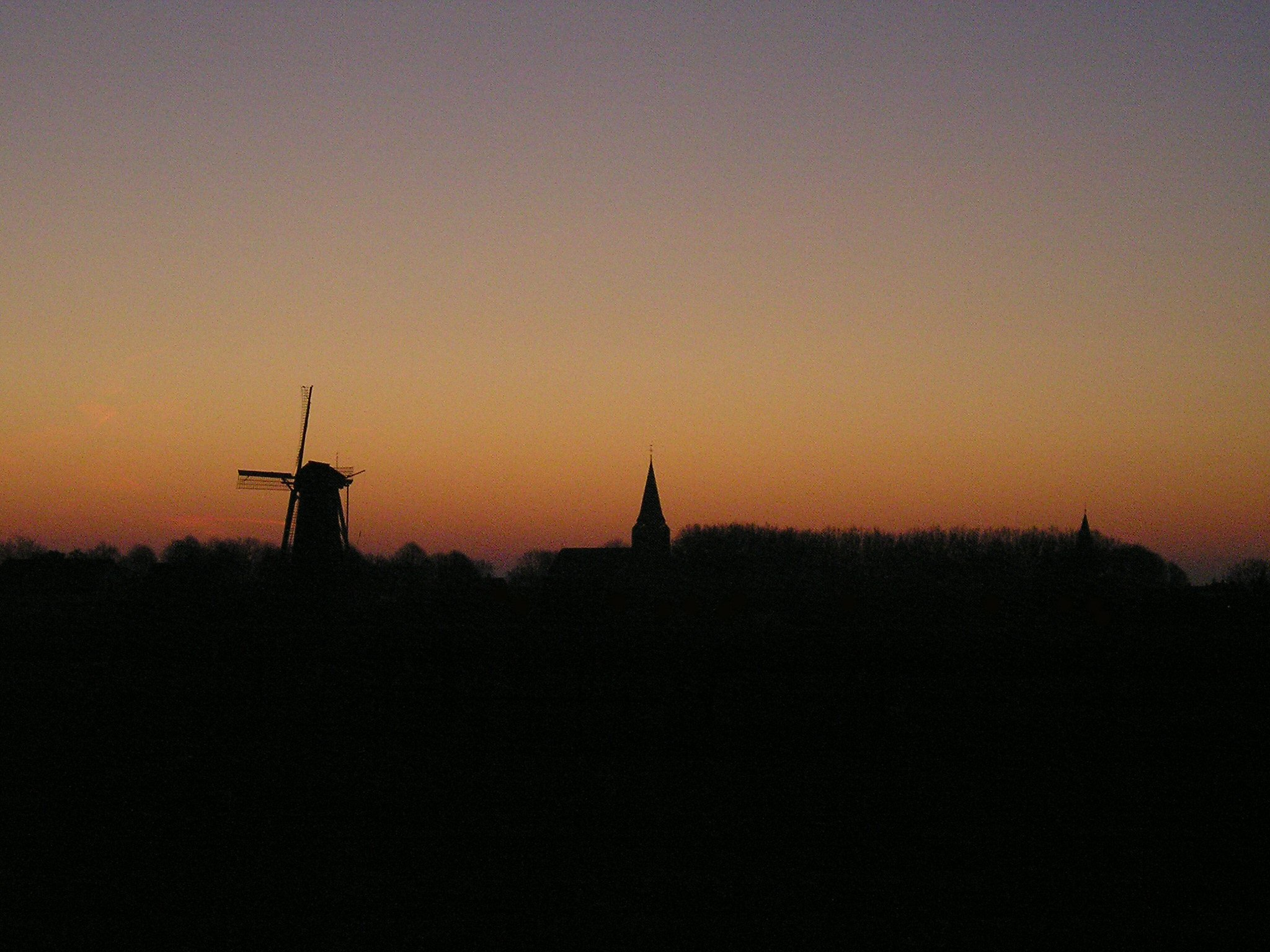
Skyline Werkhoven, 2008

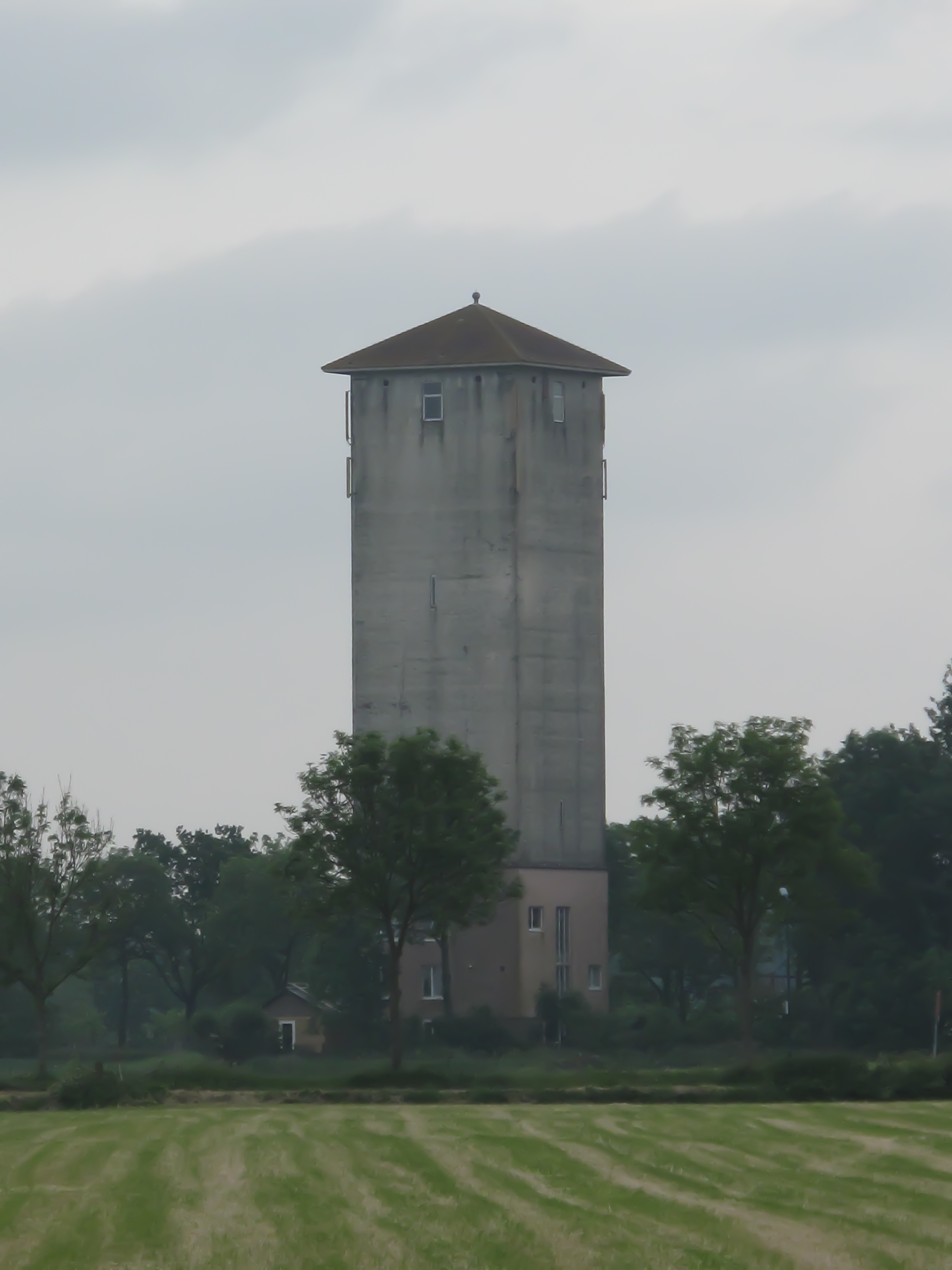
Watertower
