= Beverweerd Castle =

Medieval Dutch castle

== Exhibitions at Beverweerd Castle ==
Master painter Geert Jan Jansen has been living at Beverweerd Castle for more than 20 years. The castle is regularly open to the public, offering visitors the opportunity to view and purchase his works of art.

For information about the exhibition weekends, please visit www.geertjanjansen.nl.

=== Exhibition dates in 2026 ===
- Saturday, September 26 & Sunday, September 27
- Saturday, October 3 & Sunday, October 4
- Saturday, November 14 & Sunday, November 15
- Saturday, November 21 & Sunday, November 22

Opening hours: 11:00 AM – 5:00 PM

Beverweerd Castle
- Utrecht, Netherlands
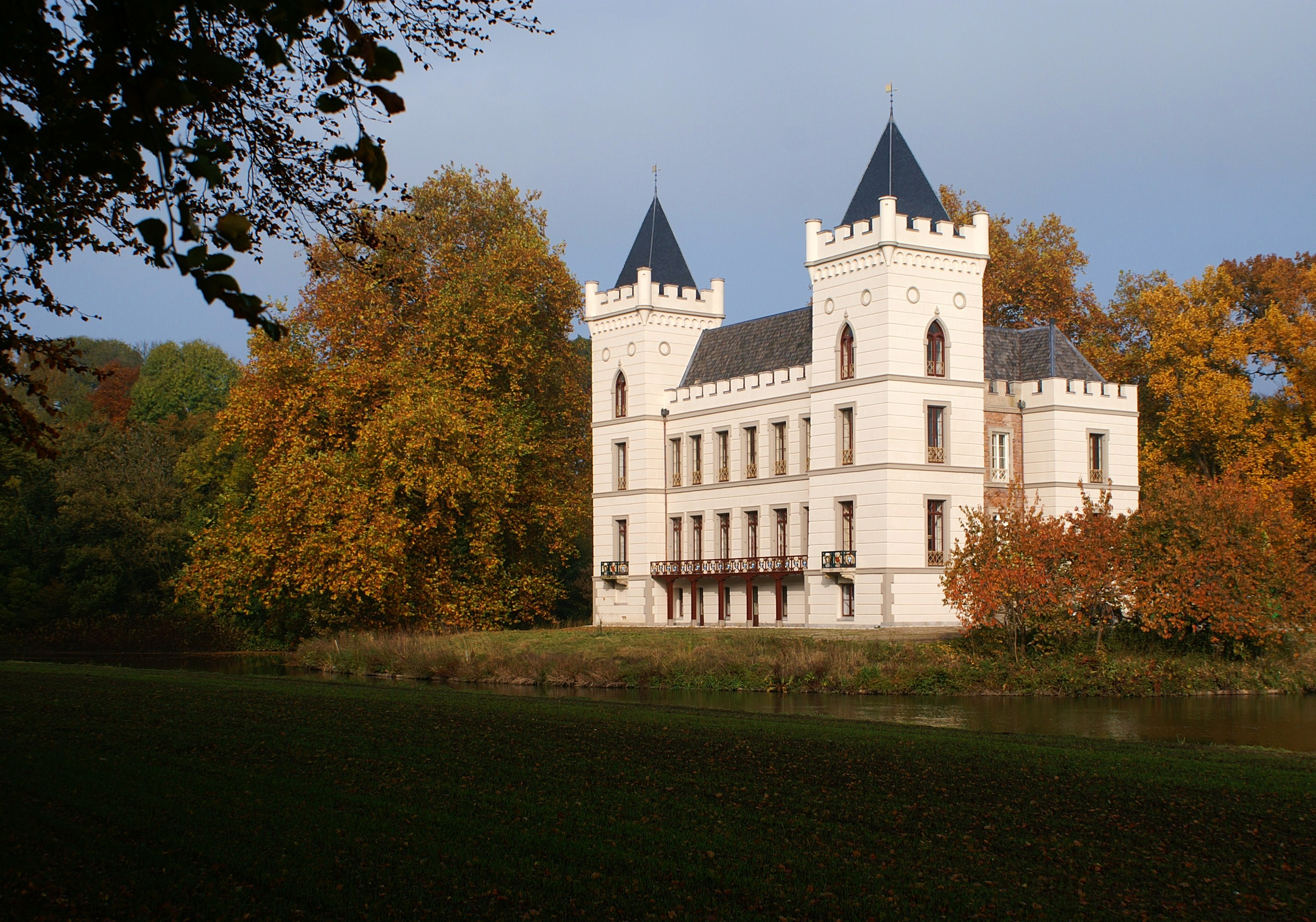
- Main castle

Site information
- Type: Medieval castle

Location
- Coordinates: 52°01′55″N 5°14′59″E

Site history
- Built: circa 1400

Beverweerd Castle is a 13th-century castle and former knight's court town, which is located on an island along the Kromme Rijn near the village of Werkhoven in the Dutch province of Utrecht. The castle is surrounded by landscaped gardens, in which the Kromme Rijn itself plays an important role in the landscape. The castle was empty for a long time and was not open to the public. Since 2006, painter and art forger Geert Jan Jansen has lived and worked at Beverweerd Castle. The surrounding gardens are ideal for walking, which offers a good view of the castle and the Kromme Rijn.

== History ==
The oldest known inhabitant of Beverweerd is knight Zweder van Zuylen. On 27 October 1536 'Klein Zuilenburg' was recognized as knightly good by the States of Utrecht. In 1563, Philip William, Prince of Orange, the eldest son of William the Silent, inherited Beverweert; after his death, the castle came into the hands of his half-brother Maurice in 1620, after which it remained in the hands of the House of Nassau for more than 150 years, who lived mainly in The Hague. In 1782 Beverweert came through the marriage of Henriette Jeanne Suzanna Marie of Nassau-LaLecq with baron Evert Frederik van Heeckeren (1755–1831) Lord of Enghuizen and Beurseas a legacy in the hands of Hendrik Jacob Carel Johan van Heeckeren van Enghuizen. It remained in the van Heeckeren family until 1938, namely from Marguerite Christine, countess van Rechteren Limpurg-baroness van Heeckeren, lady of Enghuizen, Beverweerd and Odijk (1878–1938), after which it passed to her daughter Lutgardis.

In 1958 the castle was sold by Lutgardis countess van Rechteren-Limpurg, lady of Beverweerd and Odijk (1908–1989), husband of Constantin Friedrich grave von Castell-Castell (1898–1967), to the foundation for Quaker schools in the Netherlands and the castle was renovated to make it suitable for the location of the 'International Quaker School Beverweerd'. In 1971 the name was changed to 'International School Beverweerd'. This school existed until 1997.

The building stood empty for ten years, until the Philadelphia Vegetarian Center Foundation from Oosterbeek bought it on 17 May 2005. The handover took place in September 2005. Care facilities and apartments would be built on the site for elderly vegetarians, the target group of Philadelphia Vegetarian Center. Pending the realization of the plans, the castle is inhabited by Geert Jan Jansen. In 2009, the work was stopped due to lack of money.

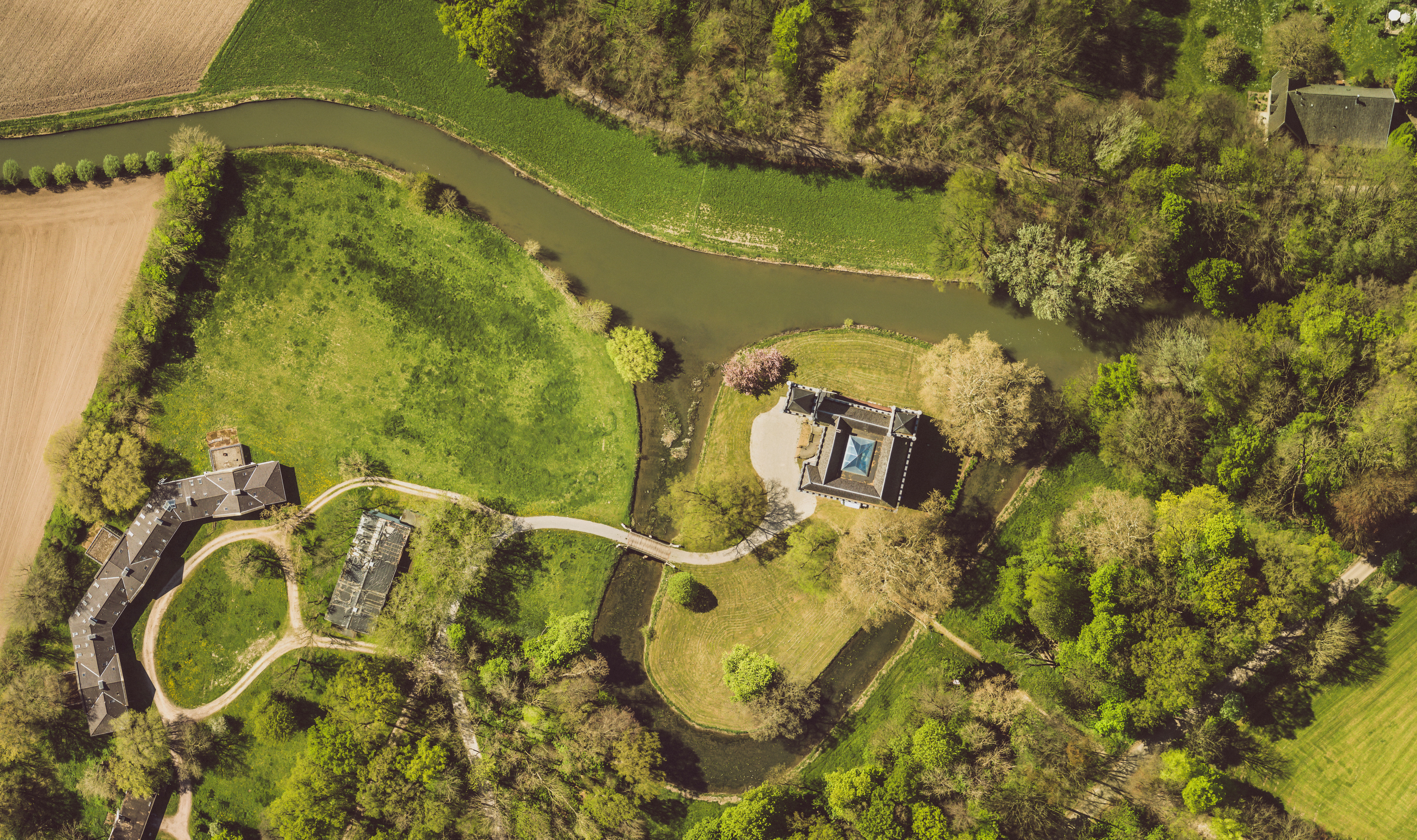
Beverweerd Castle on its island.

== Building history ==
The oldest part of the castle (the rectangular residential tower) dates from the 13th century. Soon after, the southern and western corner towers were added. In the first half of the 14th century, a square building was erected against the west tower, which was extended in the 16th century beyond the residential tower. Over time, the building was raised several times, after which the old courtyard was closed in the 17th century with an elongated wing between the two corner towers. In the nineteenth century, the castle was modernized in neo-Gothic style by the Utrecht architect Christiaan Kramm . It became a regular country house and battlements were added. Most of the plaster was removed from the castle in 1934. A layer of plaster was applied again around 2010.

== Glory ==
Heerlijkheidswapen

Philip William, Prince of Orange (1554–1618) inherited his grandmother Mary Bouchout the glory Beverweerd. Philip Willem died childless and his half-brother Maurits inherited the manor from him in 1618. After Maurice's death in 1625, one of his bastard sons, Lodewijk van Nassau-Beverweerd, inherited the manor. This family branch is called the Nassau-Beverweerd branch, later Nassau-Lalecq. The Beverweerd manor remained in this family until the end of the 18th century. The last to inherit the title of glory was Lutgardis Countess van Rechteren Limpurg, Lady of Beverweerd and Odijk (1908–1989). With the sale to the Quaker school, the latter became the rightful owner.

== Estate ==
The Beverweerd estate is over 400 hectares. It stretches from the village of Werkhoven to the Langbroekerwetering. It is a varied area consisting of agricultural land (grasslands, fields and orchards), deciduous forest and ash coppice. There are also some old avenues, including the monumental linden avenue opposite the entrance to the castle park. There are eleven farms, recognizable by the yellow, green and red shutters. The estate is a popular walking area.

== Links ==
- Beverweerd on Dutch Wikipedia
