= Jonker =

Jonker (Dutch pronunciation: [ˈjɔŋkər]) is a Dutch surname. It is also a variation of the title jonkheer. The name can be occupational of origin, indicating an ancestor who was or worked for a jonkheer, or toponymical, e.g. referring to a house named De Jonker. People with the surname include:

- Andries Jonker (born 1962), Dutch football player and manager
- Catholijn Jonker (born 1967), Dutch computer scientist
- Charles Jonker (1933–1991), South African racing cyclist
- Christiaan Jonker (born 1986), South African cricketer
- Henk Jonker (1912–2002), Dutch photographer
- Ingrid Jonker (1933–1965), South African poet
  - Ingrid Jonker Prize, literary prize for the best Afrikaans or English poetry debut work
  - Ingrid Jonker (film), Dutch English-language film about her life
- Jacobus Jonker (fl. 1996), South African paralympic athlete
- Johannes Jonker (born 1994), South African rugby player
- JW Jonker (born 1987), South African rugby player
- Kees Jonker (1909–1987), Dutch competitive sailor
- Kelly Jonker (born 1990), Dutch field hockey player
- Kobus Jonker (fl. 2000), South African paralympic athlete
- Kobus "Donker" Jonker, former head of the South African Police Service Occult Related Crimes Unit and a figure in the Satanic panic (South Africa)
- Louis Jonker (1962), South African biblical scholar and linguist
- Margo Jonker (born 1954), American softball coach
- Marius Jonker (born 1968), South African rugby referee
- Patrick Jonker (born 1944), Australian racing cyclist
- Patrick Jonker (born 1969), Dutch-born Australian racing cyclist
  - Patrick Jonker Veloway, Australian bikeway named for him
- Rein Jonker (born 1950), Dutch speed skater
- Robert James Jonker (born 1960), American (Michigan) judge
- Roos Jonker (born 1980), Dutch jazz singer
- Sjouke Jonker (1924–2007), Dutch journalist and politician, MEP 1979–84

Jonkers

- Jan Jonkers (born 1955), Dutch racing cyclist
- Jan Engbertus Jonkers (1890–1971), Dutch jurist and university dean
- Marayke Jonkers (born 1981), Australian swimmer and paratriathlete
- Tim Jonkers (born 1980), Dutch-born Irish rugby player

Adopted as a given name

- Jonker Afrikaner (c. 1785–1861), Namibian Orlam leader
- Jan Jonker Afrikaner (c. 1820–1861), Namibian Orlam leader, son of Jonker
  - Jan Jonker Afrikaner High School, secondary school in Windhoek, Namibia

== See also ==
- The Jonker, 726 carats diamond found by Johannes Jacobus Jonker in 1934
- Jonker Sailplanes, South Africa glider manufacturer founded by Uys and Attie Jonker
  - Jonker JS-1 Revelation, one of its gliders
- Jonker Walk and Jonker Street, Malacca street names dating from the Dutch colonial time (1641–1825)
- Théo De Joncker (1894–1964), Belgian composer
- Yonkers, New York, named after Jonker Adriaen van der Donck (1618–1655)
