= Margaretha van Mechelen =

Dutch noblewoman (d. 1662)

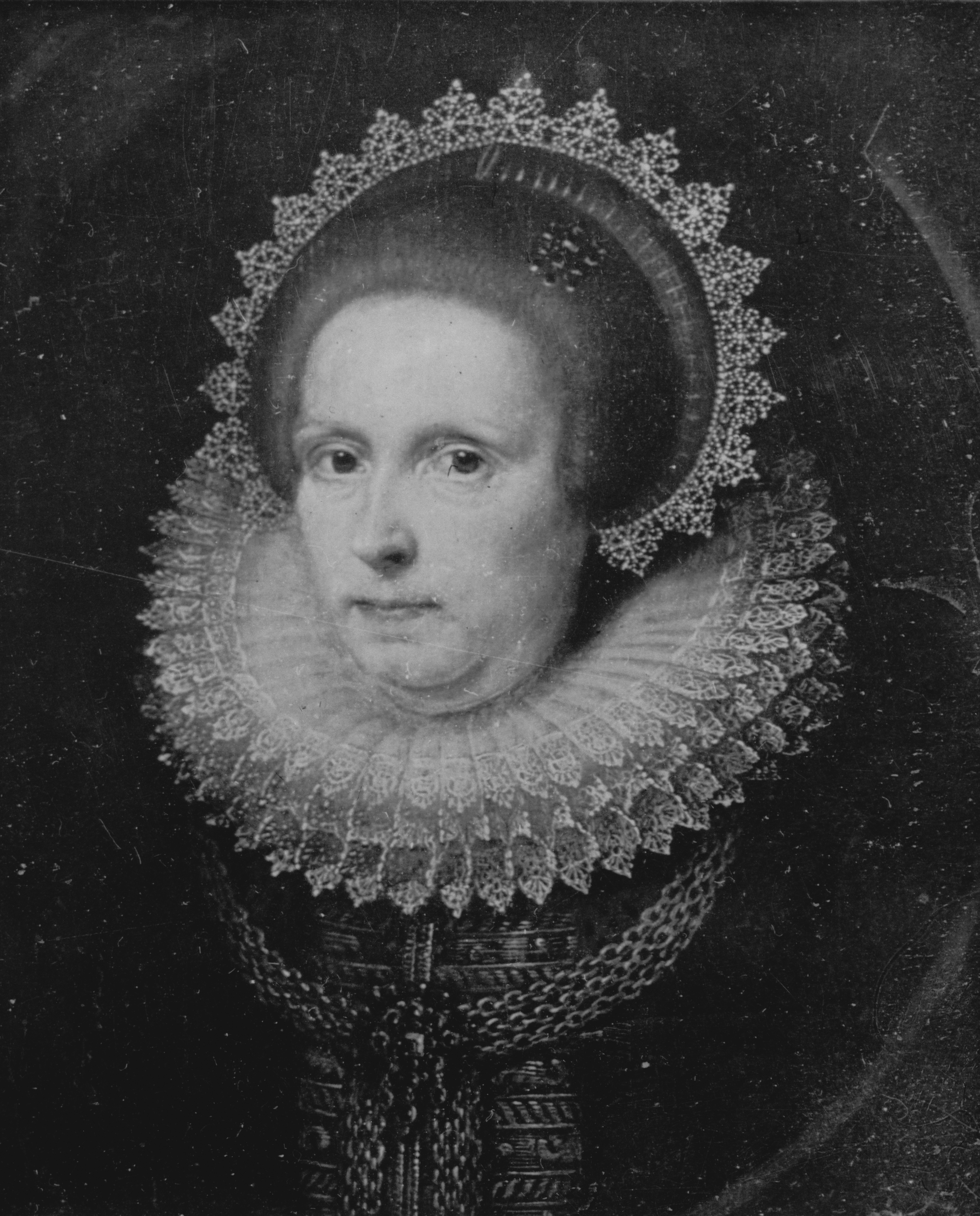
Margaretha van Mechelen

Margaretha van Mechelen (c. 1580 in Lier – 17 May 1662 in The Hague) was a noblewoman of the Southern Netherlands and (from c.1600 to c.1610) the mistress of Maurice of Nassau, Prince of Orange, with whom she had three sons:

- Willem of Nassau, Lord of the Lek
- Louis of Nassau, Lord of De Lek and Beverweerd
- Maurice of Nassau (1604-1617)

Although Maurice refused to marry her (probably because she was a Catholic and only from the minor nobility), he did state his intent to do so from his death bed (and to legitimise and marry off their children). This would threaten his half-brother Frederick Henry's place in the succession and so Frederick Henry summoned Amalia of Solms-Braunfels and married her a few days before Maurice's death. She died in 1662.
