= Stormpolder =

- Interactive map of Stormpolder
- Coordinates: 51°54′42″N 4°34′28″E
- Country: Netherlands
- Province: South Holland
- Municipality: Krimpen aan den IJssel

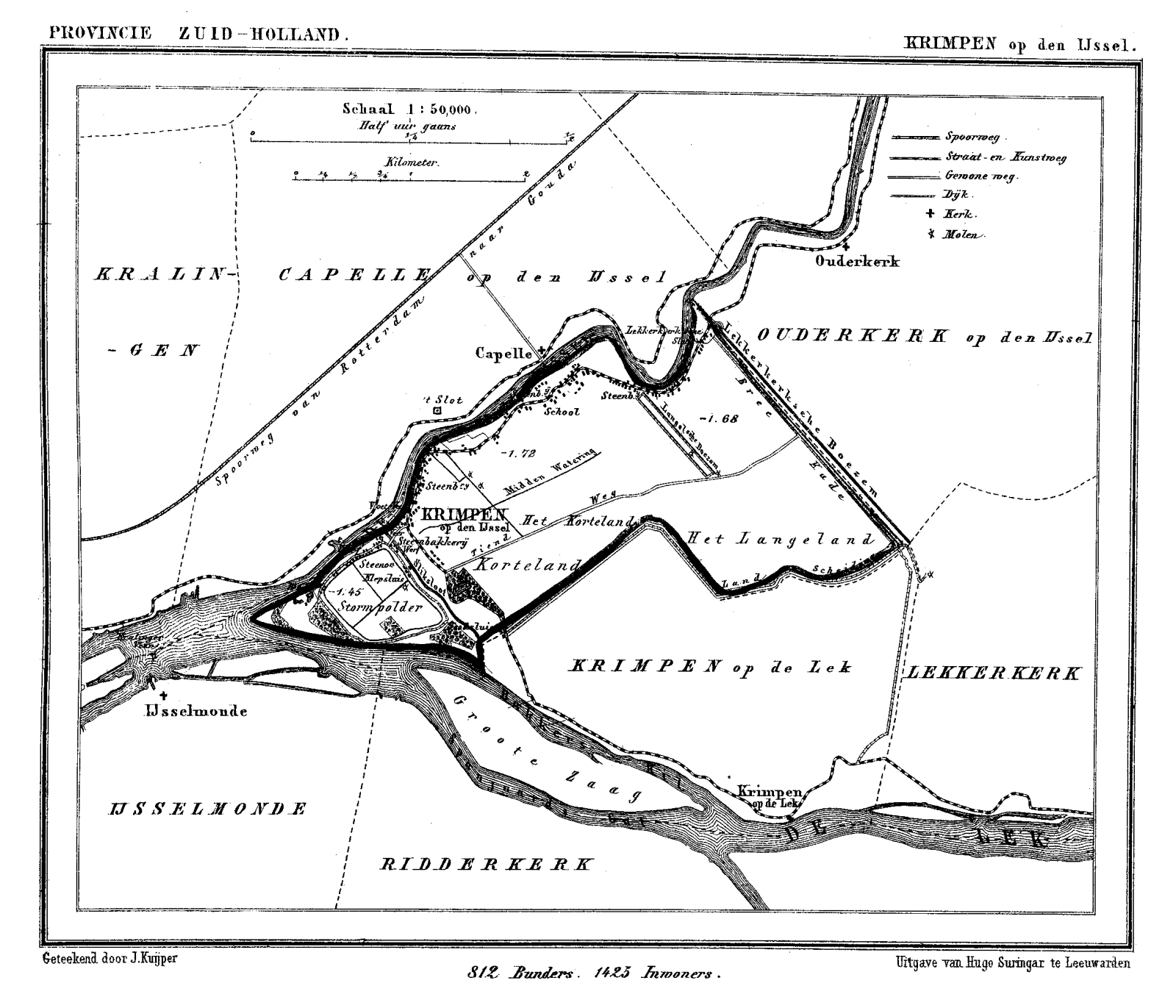
The Stormpolder is shown on this 1867 map of Krimpen aan den IJssel, southwest of the village center.

Stormpolder is a polder and a hamlet in the Dutch province of South Holland. It is located about 7 km east of the center of Rotterdam, in the municipality of Krimpen aan den IJssel. It lies between the Nieuwe Maas and Hollandsche IJssel rivers.

Stormpolder was a separate municipality between 1817 and 1855, when it became part of Krimpen aan den IJssel.
