= Henry de Nassau d'Auverquerque, 1st Earl of Grantham =

British Army officer, courtier and peer (1673–1754)

Henry de Nassau
- Baron Alford; Lord d'Auverquerque; Viscount Boston; 1st Earl of Grantham
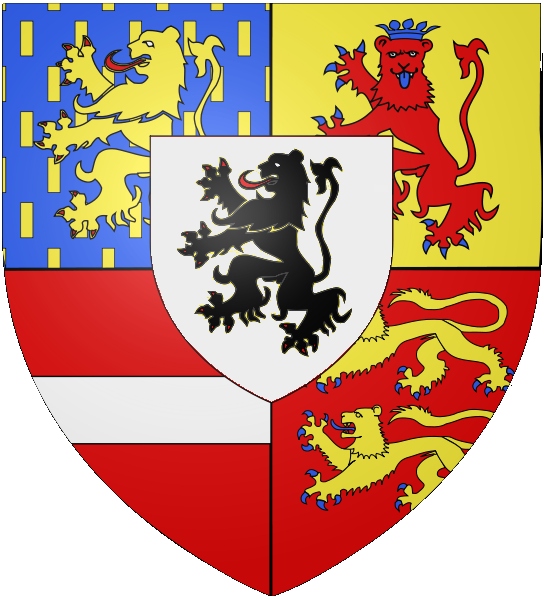
- Arms of Nassau-den Lek and Ouwerkerk ("Auverquerque")
- Born: 1673; The Hague, the Dutch Republic
- Baptised: 30 May 1673; The Hague, the Dutch Republic
- Died: 5 December 1754 (aged 81)
- Buried: 12 December 1754; St James's Church, Piccadilly, London
- Noble family: Orange-Nassau
- Spouse: Lady Henrietta Butler (1675–1724)
- Issue: Henry, Viscount Boston; Thomas, Viscount Boston; Lady Frances de Nassau d'Auverquerque; Emilia Mary; Lady Henrietta de Nassau d'Auverquerque
- Father: Hendrik van Nassau
- Mother: Francoise van Aerssen
- Occupation: Lord Chamberlain

Henry de Nassau d'Auverquerque, 1st Earl of Grantham PC (born Hendrik van Nassau, 1673 – 5 December 1754), was a British Army officer, courtier and peer who was a member of the House of Orange-Nassau and second cousin once removed to William III of England. He inherited the lordship of Ouwerkerk (known in English as Overkirk and in French as Auverquerque) in Holland, and was a count of the Holy Roman Empire.

== Life ==
He was born in The Hague to the Dutch general Henry de Nassau d'Auverquerque (called "Lord Overkirk" by the English) and his wife Frances van Aerssen, and baptised there 30 May 1673. On 12 January 1697, he married his first cousin Lady Henrietta Butler, daughter of Thomas Butler, Earl of Ossory and sister of James Butler, Duke of Ormonde. In 1698, during his father's lifetime, he was created Baron Alford, Viscount Boston and Earl of Grantham by William III.

Despite Grantham's marriage to the sister of one of the most notorious participants in the 1715 Jacobite rising, George I appointed him Lord Chamberlain to the household of Caroline, Princess of Wales in 1717, and Grantham retained his position when the Prince of Wales succeeded as King George II in 1727 and the Princess became Queen Caroline. He remained her Lord Chamberlain until her death in 1737.

Grantham was commissioned an ensign in the 2nd Regiment of Foot Guards on 17 November 1727. He was promoted to lieutenant on 2 October 1731, and on 5 July 1735, was promoted captain-lieutenant in the 1st Regiment of Foot Guards.

Grantham later involved himself in a project to create an orphanage for abandoned children in London, the first of its kind in the nation. The charity became known as the Foundling Hospital and received its royal charter on 17 October 1739. Lord Grantham was one of its founding Governors.

Grantham owned a house in Albemarle Street, Westminster that is now part of the premises of the Royal Institution, and a country house in Chiswick, called Grove Park.

Lord Grantham died on 5 December 1754 and was buried a week later at St James's Church, Piccadilly, Westminster.

== Family ==
Henry de Nassau d'Auverquerque married on 12 January 1697 his cousin Lady Henrietta Butler (died 11 October 1724), youngest daughter of Thomas Butler, 6th Earl of Ossory by his wife Emilia van Nassau (a sister of Lord Overkirk), and sister of James Butler, 2nd Duke of Ormonde and Charles Butler, Earl of Arran, and had five children:

- Henry (27 October 1697 – 19 June 1718), styled Viscount Boston from 24 December 1698.
- Thomas (1700 – 27 April 1730), styled Viscount Boston, apparently unmarried.
- Lady Frances de Nassau d'Auverquerque (born 1700s, d. 5 April 1772), who married 4 Jun 1737 St Paul's Benet Wharf (against her father's wishes) Captain (later Lieutenant-Colonel) William Elliot of Wells. Their only child died young.
- Emilia Mary (born about 1702, died 1712) died at the age of aged 10
- Lady Henrietta de Nassau d'Auverquerque (bapt 17 October 1712, died 23 September 1747), who married 27 September 1732 William Clavering-Cowper, 2nd Earl Cowper 1709–1764). Her son the 3rd Earl Cowper (1738–1789) became his uncle Lord Grantham's heir general after his aunt, Lady Frances Eliot's, death in 1772, and was created a Prince of the Holy Roman Empire in 1778 (which title expired in 1905 with the death of the last Earl Cowper). The current representative of this line is Lord Lucas (b. 1951), who is also Lord Dingwall in the Peerage of Scotland, and a co-heir to the Barony Butler since 1905.

== Arms ==
Arms of the Earls of Grantham

Political offices
Preceded by The Earl of Bridgwater	Lord Chamberlain to The Princess of Wales, later Queen Caroline; 1717–1737	Succeeded by None (death of Queen Caroline)
Peerage of England
New creation	Earl of Grantham; 1698–1754	Extinct
Dutch nobility
Preceded by William Maurice of Nassau d'Auverquerque	Lord of Ouwerkerk; 1753–1754	Succeeded by William Henry of Nassau-Lalecq
