= Baron Butler (disambiguation) =

Baron Butler was a hereditary title created in 1666 and became abeyant in 1905.

Baron Butler may also refer to:

- Robin Butler, Baron Butler of Brockwell (born 1938), British civil servant and life peer
- Baron Butler of Cloughgrenan, an extinct subsidiary title of the Earl of Arran
- Baron Butler of Mount Juliet, a subsidiary title of the Earl of Carrick
- Rab Butler, Baron Butler of Saffron Walden (1902–1982), British Conservative Party politician

== See also ==
- Elizabeth Butler-Sloss, Baroness Butler-Sloss
- Butler dynasty
