= Thomas Butler, 6th Earl of Ossory =

Irish soldier (1634–1680)

The Right Honourable The Earl of Ossory KG PC PC (Ire)
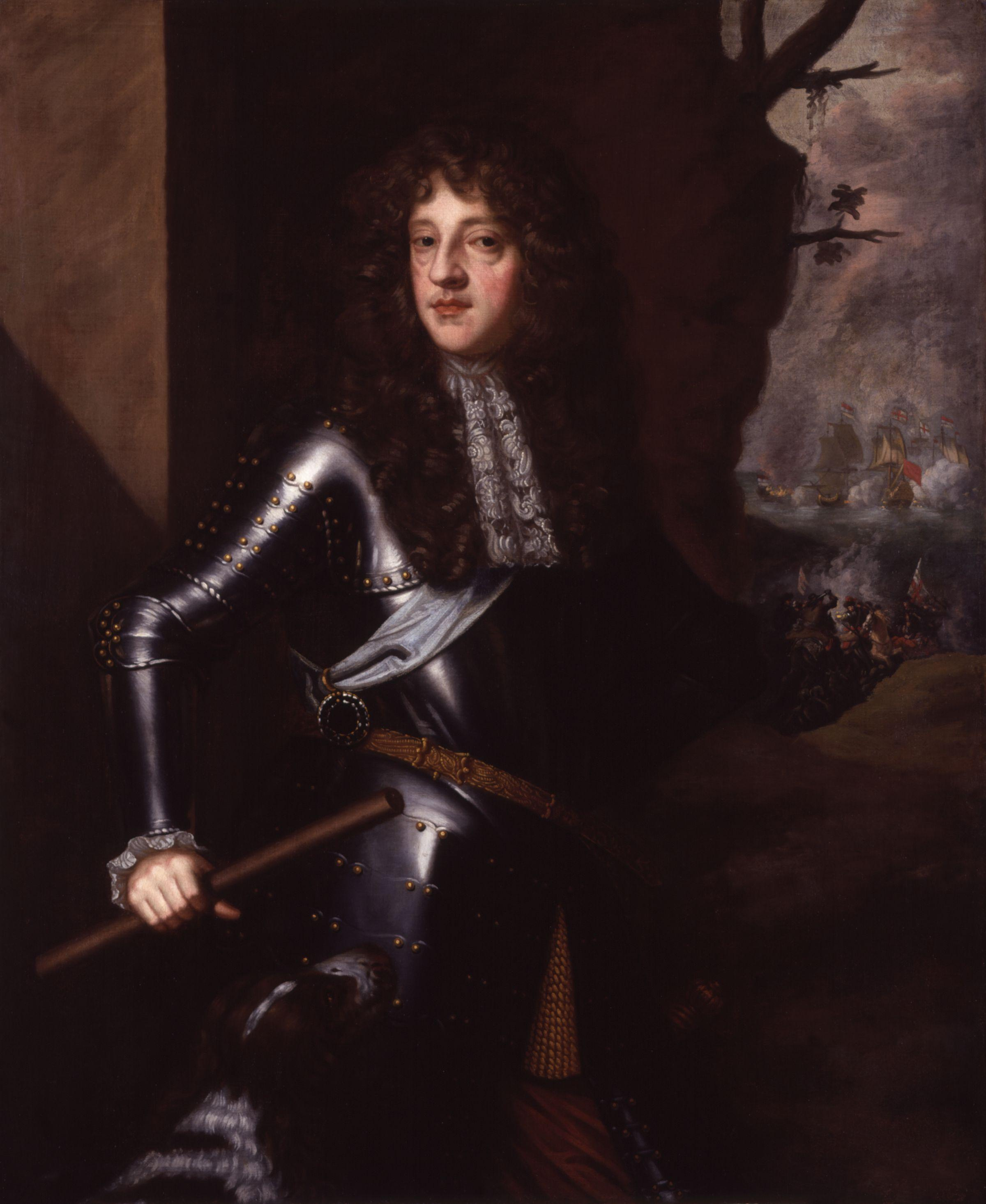
- Portrait by Sir Peter Lely
- Born: 8 July 1634; Kilkenny Castle, Ireland
- Died: 30 July 1680 (aged 46); London, England
- Spouse: Emilia van Nassau
- Children: 11 including: James Butler, 2nd Duke of Ormonde; Charles Butler, 1st Earl of Arran; Elizabeth Butler, Countess of Derby; Henrietta d'Auverquerque, Countess of Grantham
- Relatives: James Butler, 1st Duke of Ormond (father); Elizabeth Preston (mother)
- Military career
- Branch: Irish Army; Royal Navy
- Rank: Lieutenant-general (Irish Army); Vice-admiral (Royal Navy)
- Commands: HMS Resolution
- Conflicts: Second Anglo-Dutch War; Four Days' Battle; Franco-Dutch War; Action of 12 March 1672; Battle of Saint-Denis; Third Anglo-Dutch War; Battle of Solebay; Battle of Texel

Vice-Admiral Thomas Butler, 6th Earl of Ossory KG PC PC (Ire) (8 July 1634 – 30 July 1680) was an Irish soldier and politician. He was the eldest son of James Butler, 1st Duke of Ormond but predeceased his father and therefore never succeeded as duke.

== Birth and origins ==
Thomas Butler was born on 8 July 1634, at Kilkenny Castle. He was the eldest son of James Butler and his wife Elizabeth Preston. His father was then the 12th Earl of Ormond but would be raised to marquess and duke. His family, the Butler dynasty, is Old English and descends from Theobald Walter, who had been appointed Chief Butler of Ireland by King Henry II in 1177.

Thomas's mother was a second cousin once removed of his father as she was a granddaughter of Black Tom, the 10th Earl of Ormond. Her father, however, was Scottish, Richard Preston, 1st Earl of Desmond, a favourite of James I. Both parents were Protestants. They had married on Christmas Day 1629.

He had three surviving brothers and two sisters, who are listed in his father's article.

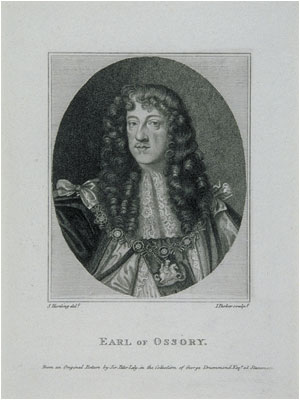
The Earl of Ossory

== Early life ==
As the eldest living son, he was the heir apparent and was styled with the corresponding courtesy title, which initially was Viscount Thurles but changed to Earl of Ossory when his father became marquess in 1642. Ossory, as he was after 1642, continued to live with his family in Ireland until 1647 when his father abandoned Dublin to the parliamentarians and Ossory accompanied his father to England. In 1648 his father renewed his support for the royalist cause and Ossory fled with his father to France, arriving in Caen, Normandy, in February 1648. Ossory's mother also moved to Caen, where she arrived on 23 June 1648 with his siblings. Ossory was educated at a school in Caen and was an accomplished athlete and a good scholar.

However, the family soon ran into financial problems. In 1652 when Cromwell had completed the conquest of Ireland, his mother brought Ossory and his sibling to London where she obtained a pension of £2000 per year from the income from her Irish estates under the condition that none of that money would be passed on to her husband. In 1655 Ossory was rightly suspected of sympathising with the exiled royalists, and was jailed by Oliver Cromwell. After his release about a year later he went into exile to the Netherlands where Charles II had his exile court at the time.

== Marriage and children ==
On 17 November 1659, while in exile in the Netherlands, Ossory married Emilia van Nassau, the second daughter of Louis of Nassau, Lord of De Lek and Beverweerd.

Thomas and Emilia had eleven children, including two sons:

1. James (1665–1745), became the 2nd Duke of Ormonde in 1688
2. Charles (1671–1758), became the de jure 3rd Duke of Ormonde, following his elder brother's attainder in 1715

—and three daughters:

1. Elizabeth (died 1717), married William Stanley, 9th Earl of Derby in 1673
2. Amelia (died 1760), inherited the estates of her brother Charles and never married
3. Henrietta (died 1724), married Henry de Nassau d'Auverquerque, 1st Earl of Grantham

== Later life ==
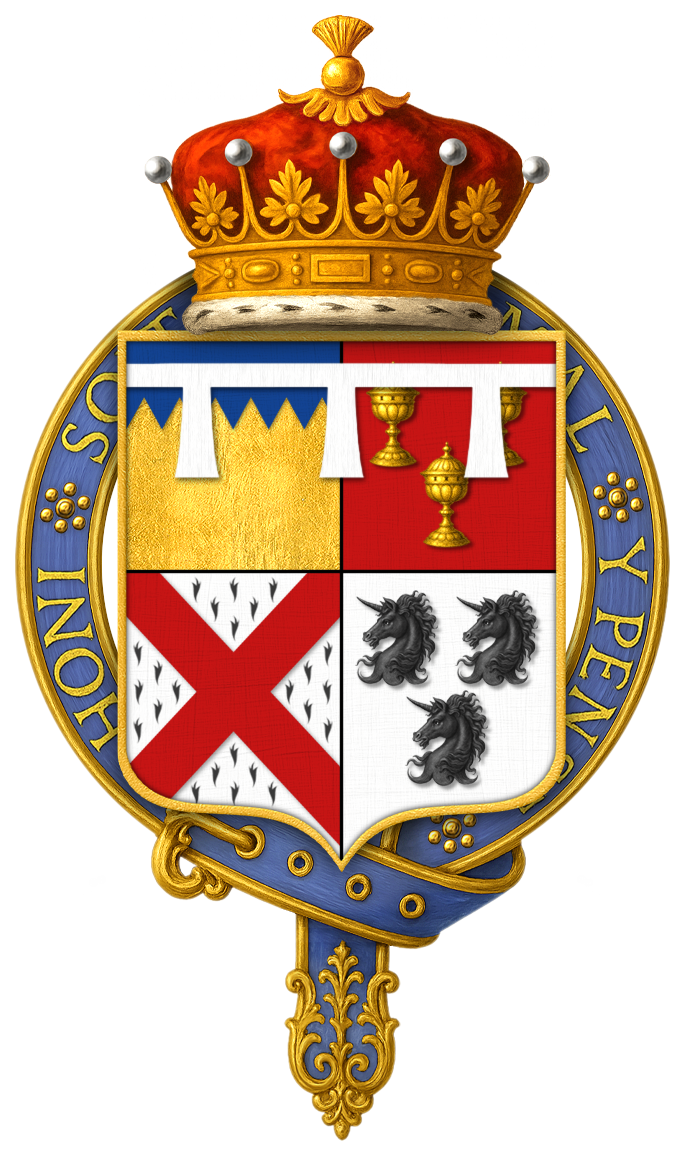
Quartered arms of Thomas Butler, 6th Earl of Ossory, KG, PC, PC (Ireland)

In 1660 at the Restoration, Ossory accompanied Charles II back to England. That same year he was appointed Lord of the Bedchamber to Charles II, a post he held until his death. Emilia was naturalised as English by act of Parliament.

In 1661 Ossory became an MP for Bristol in the English and for Dublin University in the Irish house of commons.

In 1662 Ossory was called to the Irish House of Lords under a writ of acceleration as Earl of Ossory. His father had held the title "5th Earl of Ossory" as one of his subsidiary titles. The acceleration made Thomas Butler the 6th Earl of Ossory.

In 1665 Ossory was appointed lieutenant-general in the Irish army. In 1665 during the Second Anglo-Dutch War (1665–1667), a fortunate accident allowed Ossory to take part in the Battle of Lowestoft against the Dutch.

He was created an English peer as Baron Butler of Moore Park by being summoned to the English House of Lords by a writ on 17 September 1666. Almost as soon as he appeared in the House of Lords, he was imprisoned for two days for challenging the Duke of Buckingham.

He acted as deputy for his father, who was lord-lieutenant of Ireland, and in parliament he defended Ormond's Irish administration with great vigour.

On 12 March 1672 he attacked the Dutch Smyrna fleet with HMS Resolution, starting the Third Anglo-Dutch War (1672–1674) in an action that he is said to have greatly regretted later in life.

In May 1672 he fought against the same enemies in the Battle of Solebay, serving with great distinction on both occasions.

While visiting France in 1672, he rejected the liberal offers made by Louis XIV to induce him to enter the service of France.

In August 1673 he added to his high reputation by his conduct during the Battle of Texel in August 1673. From 1677 until 1679, he served alongside his father as a Lord of the Admiralty.

Ossory was intimate with William, Prince of Orange, and in 1677 he joined the allied army in the Netherlands, commanding the British contingent and excelling at the siege of Mons in 1678.

In 1680 he was appointed governor of English Tangier, but his death prevented him from taking up his new duties.

== Death, succession, and timeline ==
Ossory died on 30 July 1680 at Arlington House in London. He was buried provisionally in Westminster Abbey on 31 July 1680. The ceremony of burial was performed belatedly on 13 November 1680. Some say Ossory's body was later taken to Ireland and reburied in the family vault in St Canice's Cathedral, Kilkenny. James, his eldest son, succeeded him as the 7th Earl of Ossory and would in 1688 become the 2nd Duke of Ormond.

Timeline
Italics for historical background.
Age	Date	Event
0	8 July 1634	Born at Kilkenny Castle, Ireland
8	30 Aug 1642	Father advanced to Marquess of Ormond.
9	Nov 1643	Father appointed Lord Lieutenant of Ireland.
12–13	1647	Left Dublin for England with his father
13	Feb 1648	Arrived at Caen, France, with his father
14	30 Jan 1649	Charles I beheaded
25	17 Nov 1659	Married Emilia von Nassau
25	29 May 1660	Restoration of Charles II
25	about Jun 1660	George Monck appointed Lord Lieutenant of Ireland.
26	18 Apr 1661	MP for Dublin University in the Irish House of Commons
27	21 Feb 1662	Father re-appointed Lord Lieutenant of Ireland.
27	22 Jun 1662	Became the 6th Earl of Ossory by writ of acceleration
32	17 Sep 1666	Created Baron Butler of Moore Park in the English peerage
33	7 Feb 1668	Appointed Lord Deputy of Ireland
37	12 Mar 1672	Attacked the Dutch Smyrna fleet
46	30 July 1680	Died

== Notes and references ==
=== Sources ===
- Airy, Osmund (1886a). "Butler, James, twelfth Earl and first Duke of Ormonde (1610–1688)". In Lee, Sidney (ed.). Dictionary of National Biography. Vol. VIII. New York: MacMillan and Co. pp. 52–60. OCLC 8544105.
- Airy, Osmund (1886b). "Butler, Thomas, Earl of Ossory (1634–1680)". In Lee, Sidney (ed.). Dictionary of National Biography. Vol. VIII. New York: MacMillan and Co. pp. 81–85. OCLC 8544105.
- Armstrong, Robert (October 2009). "Butler, Thomas". In McGuire, James; Quinn, James (eds.). Dictionary of Irish Biography (online ed.).
- Burke, Bernard; Burke, Ashworth Peter (1915). A Genealogical and Heraldic History of the Peerage and Baronetage, the Privy Council, Knightage and Companionage (77th ed.). London: Harrison. OCLC 1155471554.
- Carte, Thomas (1851) [1st pub. 1736]. The Life of James Duke of Ormond. Vol. III (New ed.). Oxford: Oxford University Press. OCLC 1086656347. – 1643 to 1660
- Chester, Joseph Lemuel (1876). Registers of Westminster Abbey. London: Private Edition. OCLC 1140248. – Marriages, baptisms and burials from about 1660 to 1875
- Chisholm, Hugh, ed. (1911). "Ossory, Thomas Butler, Earl of". Encyclopædia Britannica. Vol. XX (11th ed.). New York: The Encyclopædia Britannica Company. pp. 354–355. OCLC 43740094.
- Cokayne, George Edward (1895). Complete Peerage of England, Scotland, Ireland, Great Britain and the United Kingdom, Extant, Extinct, or Dormant. Vol. VI (1st ed.). London: George Bell and Sons. OCLC 1180818801. – N to R (for Ossory under Ormond)
- Cokayne, George Edward (1910). Gibbs, Vicary (ed.). The complete peerage of England, Scotland, Ireland, Great Britain and the United Kingdom, extant, extinct, or dormant. Vol. I (2nd ed.). London: St Catherine Press. OCLC 228661424. – Ab-Adam to Basing (for Arran)
- Cokayne, George Edward (1912). Gibbs, Vicary (ed.). The complete peerage of England, Scotland, Ireland, Great Britain and the United Kingdom, extant, extinct, or dormant. Vol. II (2nd ed.). London: St Catherine Press. OCLC 228661424. – Bass to Canning (for Butler of Moore Park)
- Davies, J. D. (2004). "Butler, Thomas, sixth earl of Ossory (1634–1680)". In Matthew, Henry Colin Gray.; Harrison, Brian (eds.). Oxford Dictionary of National Biography. Vol. 9. New York: Oxford University Press. pp. 226–229. ISBN 0-19-861359-8.
- Debrett, John (1816). Peerage of the United Kingdom of Great Britain and Ireland. Vol. I (10th ed.). London: F. C. and J. Rivington. OCLC 23089464. – England (for his daughter Elizabeth, cited here because the corresponding page is missing in the 1828 edition.)
- Debrett, John (1828). Peerage of the United Kingdom of Great Britain and Ireland. Vol. II (17th ed.). London: F. C. and J. Rivington. OCLC 54499602. – Scotland and Ireland
- Dunboyne, Patrick Theobald Tower Butler, Baron (1968). Butler Family History (2nd ed.). Kilkenny: Rothe House.
- Evelyn, John (1901). Bray, William (ed.). The Diary of John Evelyn. Vol. II (New, in two volumes ed.). New York & London: M. Walter Dunn. OCLC 954140620. – 1665 to 1706
- Fryde, E. B.; Greenway, D. E.; Porter, S.; Roy, I., eds. (1986). Handbook of British Chronology. Royal Historical Society Guides and Handbooks, No. 2 (3rd ed.). London: Offices of the Royal Historical Society. ISBN 0-86193-106-8. – (for timeline)
- House of Commons (1878). Return. Members of Parliament – Part II. Parliaments of Great Britain, 1705–1796. Parliaments of the United Kingdom, 1801–1874. Parliaments and Conventions of the Estates of Scotland, 1357–1707. Parliaments of Ireland, 1599–1800. London: His/Her Majesty's Stationery Office. OCLC 13112546. (for the subject as MP)
- Lodge, John (1789). Archdall, Mervyn (ed.). The Peerage of Ireland or, A Genealogical History of the Present Nobility of that Kingdom. Vol. IV. Dublin: James Moore. OCLC 264906028. – Viscounts
- Perceval-Maxwell, Michael (2004). "Butler [née Preston] Elizabeth, duchess of Ormond and suo jure Lady Dingwall (1615–1684)". In Matthew, Henry Colin Gray.; Harrison, Brian (eds.). Oxford Dictionary of National Biography. Vol. 9. New York: Oxford University Press. pp. 130–131. ISBN 0-19-861359-8.
- Ward, Adolphus William (1886). "Butler, James, second Duke of Ormonde (1665–1745)". In Lee, Sidney (ed.). Dictionary of National Biography. Vol. VIII. New York: MacMillan and Co. pp. 60–65. OCLC 8544105.

Parliament of England
Preceded by John Stephens; Sir John Knight	Member of Parliament for Bristol with Sir John Knight; 1661–1666	Succeeded by Sir John Knight; Sir Humphrey Hooke
Political offices
Preceded by The Duke of Ormonde (Lord Lieutenant)	Lord Deputy of Ireland; 1668–1669	Succeeded by The Lord Robartes (Lord Lieutenant)
Peerage of England
New creation	Baron Butler; 1666–1680	Succeeded by James Butler
Peerage of Ireland
Preceded by James Butler	Earl of Ossory (writ in acceleration)	Succeeded by James Butler
Military offices
Preceded by Palmes Fairborne	Governor of Tangier; 1680–1680	Succeeded by Charles FitzCharles, 1st Earl of Plymouth
