= Henrietta d'Auverquerque, Countess of Grantham =

English noblewoman (died 1724)

The Right Honourable The Countess of Grantham
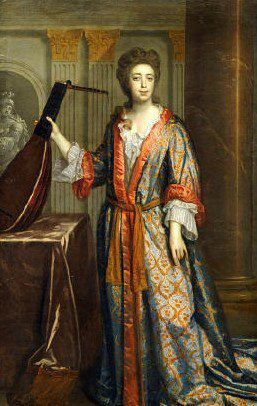
- Born: Henrietta Butler
- Died: 11 October 1724
- Noble family: Butler
- Spouse: Henry de Nassau d'Auverquerque, 1st Earl of Grantham
- Issue: Henry, Viscount Boston; Thomas, Viscount Boston; Lady Frances de Nassau d'Auverquerque; Emilia Mary; Lady Henrietta de Nassau d'Auverquerque
- Father: Thomas Butler, 6th Earl of Ossory
- Mother: Emilia van Nassau-Beverweerd

Henrietta d'Auverquerque, Countess of Grantham (died 11 October 1724), formerly Lady Henrietta Butler, was an English noblewoman and the wife of Henry de Nassau d'Auverquerque, 1st Earl of Grantham.

== History ==
Henrietta was the youngest daughter of Thomas Butler, 6th Earl of Ossory, and a sister of James Butler, 2nd Duke of Ormonde, a well-known Jacobite nobleman. Her mother, Emilia, was a Dutch noblewoman; Henrietta was thus a first cousin of her husband, whose father was Emilia's brother. They were married on 12 January 1697 and had the following children:

- Henry (1697–1718), styled Viscount Boston
- Thomas (1700–1730), styled Viscount Boston, who died unmarried.
- Lady Frances de Nassau d'Auverquerque (died 1772), who married Captain (later Lieutenant-Colonel) William Elliot of Wells, and had one child who died in infancy
- Emilia Mary (c.1702–1712)
- Lady Henrietta de Nassau d'Auverquerque (1712–1747), who married William Clavering-Cowper, 2nd Earl Cowper, and was the mother of George Clavering-Cowper, 3rd Earl Cowper

From 1718 until her death in 1724, the countess was a Lady of the Bedchamber to Caroline of Ansbach, then Princess of Wales.
