= James Butler, 2nd Duke of Ormonde =

Irish statesman and army officer (1665–1745)

General His Grace The Duke of Ormonde KG PC
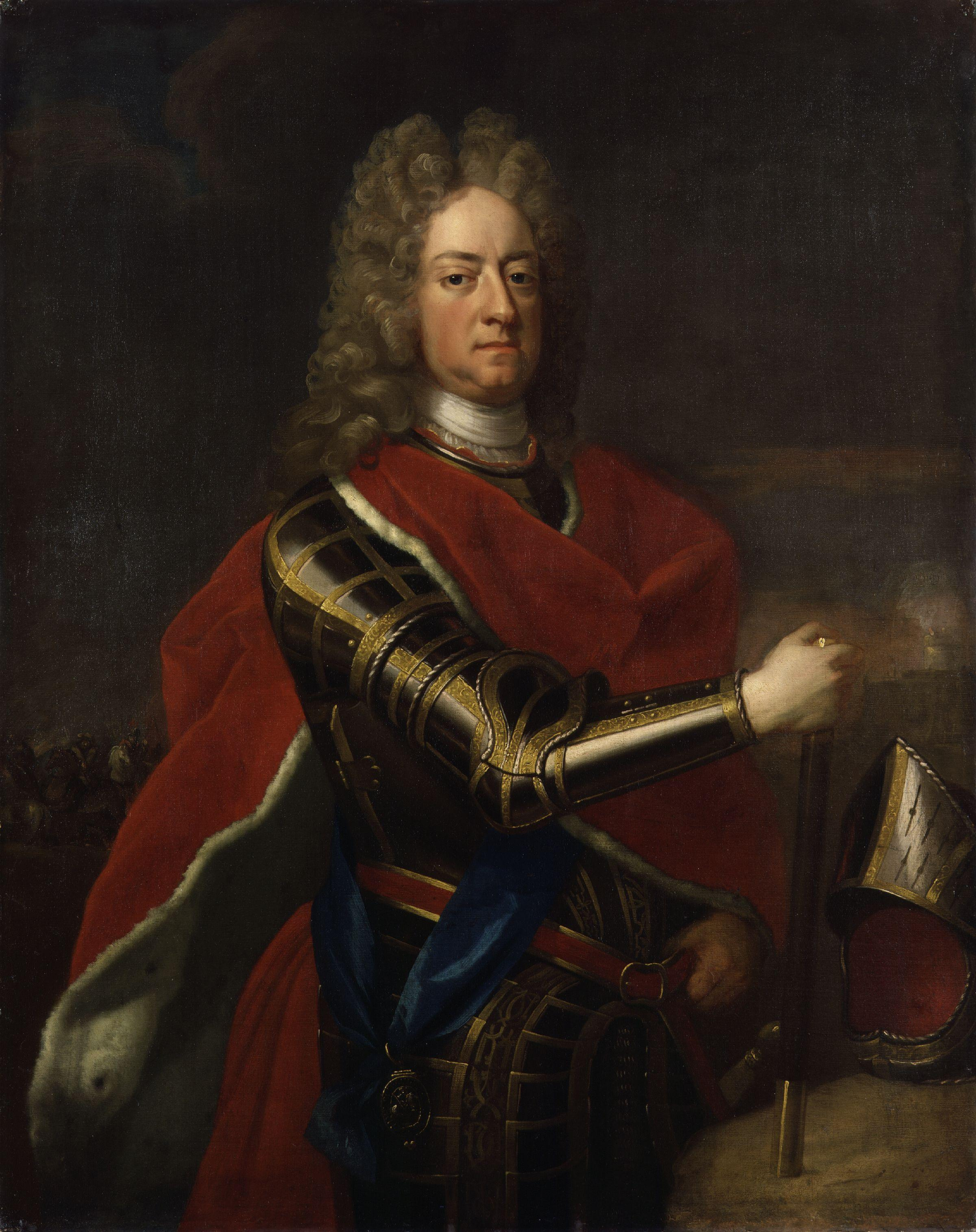
- Portrait by Michael Dahl

Lord Lieutenant of Ireland
- In office 19 February 1703 – 30 April 1707
- Monarch: Anne
- Preceded by: The Earl of Rochester
- Succeeded by: The Earl of Pembroke
- In office 26 October 1710 – 22 September 1713
- Monarch: Anne
- Preceded by: The Earl of Wharton
- Succeeded by: The Duke of Shrewsbury

Personal details
- Born: 29 April 1665 Dublin, Leinster, Ireland
- Died: 16 September 1745 (aged 80) Papal Enclave of Avignon
- Spouse(s): Lady Anne Hyde; Lady Mary Somerset
- Children: 4, including Mary
- Parent(s): Thomas Butler, 6th Earl of Ossory; Emilia van Nassau-Beverweerd
- Awards: Knight of the Garter

Military service
- Allegiance: England; Great Britain; Spain
- Branch/service: English Army; British Army; Spanish Army
- Rank: General
- Battles/wars: Monmouth Rebellion; Williamite War in Ireland; Nine Years' War; War of the Spanish Succession; Jacobite rising of 1715

James FitzJames Butler, 2nd Duke of Ormonde (29 April 1665 – 16 September 1745), was an Irish statesman and army officer. He was the third of the Kilcash branch of the family to inherit the earldom of Ormond. Like his grandfather, the 1st Duke, he was raised as a Protestant, unlike his extended family who held to Roman Catholicism. He served in the campaign to put down the Monmouth Rebellion, in the Williamite War in Ireland, in the Nine Years' War and in the War of the Spanish Succession but was accused of treason and went into exile after the Jacobite rising of 1715.

== Birth and origins ==
James was born on 29 April 1665 at Dublin Castle. He was the second but eldest surviving son of Thomas Butler by his wife Emilia van Nassau-Beverweerd. His father was known as Lord Ossory. He was heir apparent of James Butler, 1st Duke of Ormond, but predeceased him and so never became duke. His father's family, the Butler dynasty, was Old English and descended from Theobald Walter, who had been appointed Chief Butler of Ireland by King Henry II in 1177. James's mother was Dutch. She descended from a cadet branch of the House of Nassau. Both parents were Protestant. They married on 17 November 1659.

They had eleven children.

James listed among his siblings
He appears among some of his siblings as the fourth child:
1. Elizabeth (died 1717), married William Stanley, 9th Earl of Derby in 1673
2. Henrietta (died 1724), married Henry de Nassau d'Auverquerque, 1st Earl of Grantham
3. Amelia (died 1760), inherited from her brother Charles and never married
4. James (1665–1745)
5. Charles (1671–1758), became the de jure 3rd Duke of Ormonde, following his elder brother's attainder in 1715

== Early life ==
He was educated in France and afterwards at Christ Church, Oxford. On the death of his father on 30 July 1680 he became Baron Butler in the English peerage and the 7th Earl of Ossory in the Irish Peerage. On 9 February 1683 he was admitted to the Middle Temple, alongside his grandfather, James Butler, 1st Duke of Ormond, and several other peers.

== Early military career ==
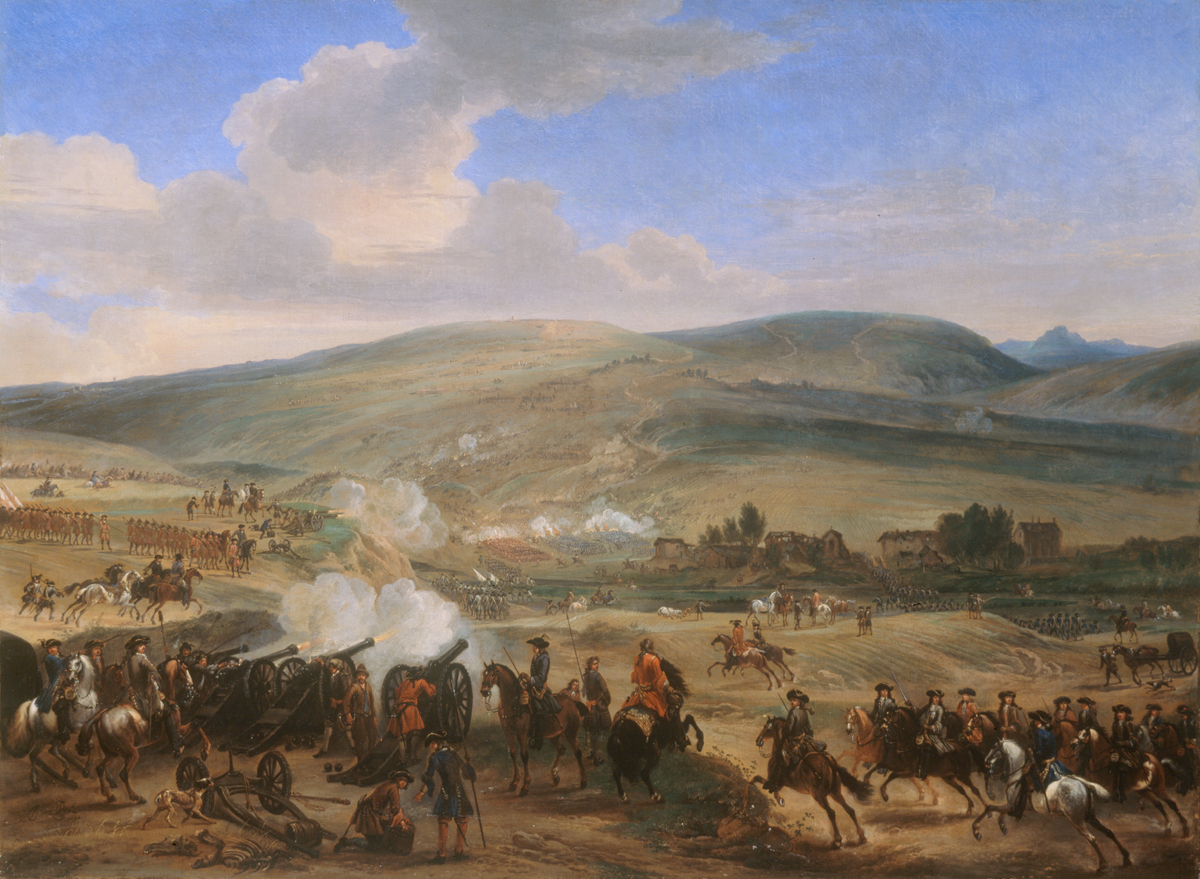
The Battle of the Boyne, at which Butler commanded the Queen's Troop.

Arms of James Butler, 2nd Duke of Ormonde

He obtained command of a cavalry regiment in Ireland in 1683, and having received an appointment at court on the accession of James II, he served against the Duke of Monmouth at the Battle of Sedgemoor in July 1685. Having succeeded his grandfather as 2nd Duke of Ormonde on 21 July 1688, he was appointed a Knight of the Order of the Garter on 28 September 1688. In 1688 he also became Chancellor of the University of Dublin and Chancellor of the University of Oxford.

In January and February 1689 he voted against the motion to put William of Orange and Mary on the throne and against the motion to declare that James II had abdicated it. Nevertheless, he subsequently joined the forces of William of Orange, by whom he was made colonel of the Queen's Troop of Horse Guards on 20 April 1689. He accompanied William in his Irish campaign, debarking with him in Carrickfergus on 14 June 1690 and commanded this troop at the Battle of the Boyne in July 1690. In February 1691 he became Lord Lieutenant of Somerset.

He served on the continent under William of Orange during the Nine Years' War and, having been promoted to major-general, he fought at the Battle of Steenkerque in August 1692 and the Battle of Landen in July 1693, where he was taken prisoner by the French and then exchanged for the Duke of Berwick, James II's illegitimate son. He was promoted to lieutenant-general in 1694.

After the accession of Queen Anne in March 1702, he became commander of the land forces co-operating with Sir George Rooke in Spain, where he fought in the Battle of Cádiz in August 1702 and the Battle of Vigo Bay in October 1702 during the War of the Spanish Succession (1701–1714). Having been made a Privy Councillor, Ormonde succeeded Lord Rochester as Lord Lieutenant of Ireland in 1703. In 1704 he leased and rebuilt a property that became known as Ormonde Lodge in Richmond outside London.

Following the dismissal of the Duke of Marlborough, Ormonde was appointed Commander-in-Chief of the Forces and colonel of the 1st Regiment of Foot Guards on 4 January 1712 and Captain-General on 26 February 1712. In the Irish Parliament Ormonde and the majority of peers supported the Tory interest.

Family tree

James Butler with wife, parents, and other selected relatives. (Note: This family tree is partly derived from the condensed Butler family tree pictured in Dunboyne. Also see the lists of siblings and children in the text.)

Walter; 11th Earl; 1559–1633
Thomas; Viscount; Thurles d. 1619 d.v.p.*	Elizabeth; Pointz; 1587–1673
James; 1st Duke; 1610–1688	Elizabeth; Preston; 1615–1684	Richard B. of Kilcash; 1615–1701	Frances; Tuchet
Thomas; 6th Earl; Ossory; 1633–1680 d.v.p.*	Emilia von Nassau; 1635–1688	Walter B. of Garryricken d. 1700 d.v.p.*
Anne; Hyde d. 1685	James; 2nd Duke; 1665–1745	Mary; Somerset; 1664–1733	Charles; 1st Earl Arran de jure 3rd Duke; 1671–1758	Thomas B. of Garryricken d. 1738
Mary; Butler d. 1688	Thomas; Butler; 1686–1689	John de jure 15th Earl d. 1766

Legend

XXX	Subject of the article	XXX	Earls & dukes of Ormond

*d.v.p. = predeceased his father (decessit vita patris).

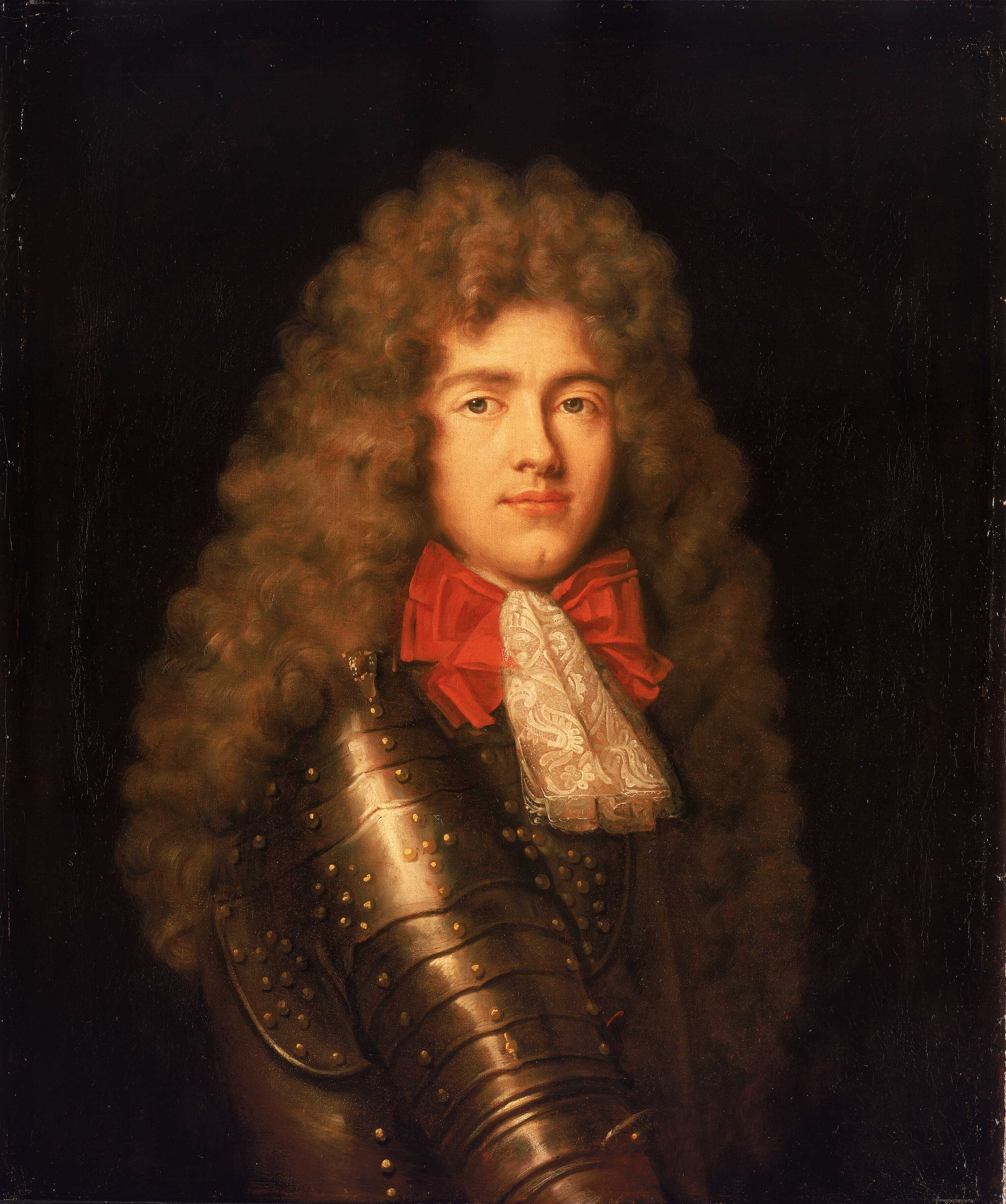
James when he was still Lord Ossory

=== The Guiscard affair ===
He played a dramatic role at the notorious meeting of the Privy Council on 8 March 1711 when Antoine de Guiscard, a French double agent who was being questioned about his treasonable activities, attempted to assassinate Robert Harley, 1st Earl of Oxford, against whom he had a personal grudge for drastically cutting his allowance, by stabbing him with a penknife (how he managed to get into the Council room with a weapon remains a mystery). Harley was wounded, but not seriously, due largely to the fact that he was wearing a heavy gold brocade waistcoat, in which the knife got stuck. Several Councillors, including Ormonde, stabbed Guiscard in return. Guiscard implored Ormonde to finish the deed, but Ormonde replied that it was not for him to play the hangman. In any case, he had the sense to see that Guiscard must be kept alive at least long enough to be questioned, although as it turned out Guiscard's wounds were fatal and he died a week later.

=== The last campaign ===
On 23 April 1712 he left Harwich for Rotterdam to lead the British troops taking part in the war. Once there he allowed himself to be made the tool of the Tory ministry, whose policy was to carry on the war in the Netherlands while giving secret orders to Ormonde to take no active part in supporting their allies under Prince Eugene. Eugene had no intention of serving under Ormonde, and the Dutch, whose forces formed the core of the Allied army in the Low Countries and had gained a formidable reputation through decades of warfare against France, were likewise unwilling to place their army under his command. They therefore supported Eugene, who was appointed commander in chief and took command of the larger of the two allied armies. Ormonde retained command of the British troops and most of the subsidy forces maintained in British and Dutch pay, while the Imperial and Dutch contingents served under Eugene.

In July 1712 Ormonde advised Prince Eugene that he could no longer support the siege of Quesnoy and that he was withdrawing the British troops from the action and instead intended to take possession of Dunkirk. According to Winston Churchill, "terrible scenes were witnessed of [British] men breaking their muskets, tearing their hair and pouring out blasphemies and curses against the Queen and the Ministry who could subject them to that ordeal." The Dutch were so exasperated at the withdrawal of the British troops that Nassau-Woudenberg and Hompesch, two Dutch commanders, closed the towns of Bouchain on Douai to British access, despite the fact that they had plenty of stores and medical facilities available. Ormonde took possession of Ghent and Bruges as well as Dunkirk, in order to ensure his troops were adequately provided for. On 15 April 1713 he became Lord Lieutenant of Norfolk.

== Jacobite ==
Ormonde's position as Captain-General made him a personage of much importance in the crisis brought about by the death of Queen Anne and, during the last years of Queen Anne, Ormonde almost certainly had Jacobite leanings and corresponded with the Jacobite Court including his cousin, Piers Butler, 3rd Viscount Galmoye, who kept barrels of gunpowder at Kilkenny Castle. King George I on his accession to the throne in August 1714 instituted extensive changes and excluded the Tories from royal favour. Ormonde was stripped of his posts as Captain-General, as colonel of the 1st Regiment of Foot Guards and as Commander in Chief of the Forces with the first two posts going to the Duke of Marlborough and the role of Commander-in-Chief going to the Earl of Stair. On 19 November 1714 Ormonde was instead made a member of the reconstituted Privy Council of Ireland.

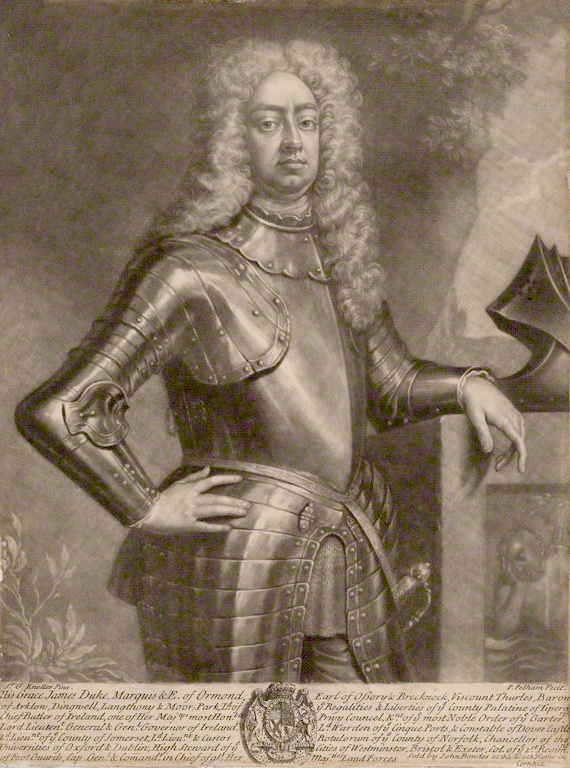
James Butler c. 1725–1730

Accused of supporting the Jacobite rising of 1715, during which the rebels had shouted "High church and Ormond", he was impeached for high treason by Lord Stanhope on 21 June 1715. He might have avoided the impending storm of parliamentary prosecution, if he had remained in England and stood trial but instead he chose to flee to France in August 1715 and initially stayed in Paris with Lord Bolingbroke. On 20 August 1715 he was attainted by the Attainder of Duke of Ormonde Act 1714 (1 Geo. 1. St. 2. c. 17); his estate forfeited, and honours extinguished. The Earl Marshal was instructed to remove the names and armorial bearings of Ormonde and Bolingbroke from the list of peers and Ormonde's banner as Knight of the Garter was taken down in St George's Chapel.

On 20 June 1716, the Parliament of Ireland passed the County Palatine of Tipperary Act 1715 (2 Geo. 1. c. 8 (I)), extinguishing the regalities and liberties of the county palatine of Tipperary; for vesting his estate in the crown and for giving a reward of £10,000 for his apprehension, should he attempt to land in Ireland. But the Parliament of Great Britain passed the Crown Lands (Forfeited Estates) Act 1720 (7 Geo. 1. St. 1. c. 22) on 24 June 1721 which enabled his brother, Charles Butler, 1st Earl of Arran, to purchase his estate, which he accordingly did.

Ormonde subsequently moved to Spain where he held discussions with Cardinal Alberoni. He later took part in a Spanish and Jacobite plan to invade England and put James Francis Edward Stuart on the British throne in 1719, but his fleet was disbanded by a storm in the Bay of Biscay. In 1732 he moved to Avignon, where he was seen in 1733 by the writer, Lady Mary Wortley Montagu. Ormonde died at Avignon in exile on 16 November 1745, but his body was brought back to London and buried in Westminster Abbey on 22 May 1746.

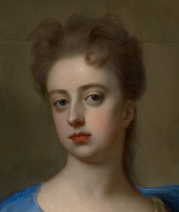
Mary Somerset, his second wife, painted by Michael Dahl

== Marriage and children ==
On 20 July 1682 he, then called Lord Ossory, married Lady Anne Hyde, daughter of Laurence Hyde, who was then Viscount Hyde of Kenilworth but became Earl of Rochester in November. The couple had a daughter, Mary, who died young in 1688.

Following the death of his first wife (which is known to have caused him intense grief) in 1685, Ossory planned to marry again, in order to secure a male heir. He gained permission from the House of Lords for the arranging of a jointure for another marriage in May 1685, and in August of that year, he married Lady Mary Somerset, daughter of the Duke of Beaufort and Mary Capel. The couple had a son, Thomas (1686–1689), and two daughters, Elizabeth (1689–1750) and Mary (1690–1713). Ormonde's second wife was a lady of the bedchamber to Queen Anne. Their younger daughter, Mary, married John Ashburnham, 1st Earl of Ashburnham.

== Bibliography ==
=== Books ===
- Barnard, Toby, and Jane Fenlon (eds.) (2000). The Dukes of Ormonde, 1610–1745. Woodbridge: Boydell Press. ISBN 978-0-85115-761-0 OCLC 44956083
- Burke, Bernard; Burke, Ashworth Peter (1915). A Genealogical and Heraldic History of the Peerage and Baronetage, the Privy Council, Knightage and Companionage (77th ed.). London: Harrison. OCLC 1155471554.
- Cane, Robert; Lenihan, Maurice (1884). The History of the Williamite and Jacobite Wars in Ireland from their Origin to the Capture of Athlone with Continuation to the Death of James II. Dublin: James Duffy and sons. OCLC 1046587889.
- Chester, Joseph Lemuel (1876). Registers of Westminster Abbey. London: Private Edition. OCLC 1140248. – Marriages, baptisms and burials from about 1660 to 1875
- Churchill, Winston (1936). Marlborough: His Life and Times. George G. Harrap Co. Ltd London.
- Cokayne, George Edward (1895). Complete Peerage of England, Scotland, Ireland, Great Britain and the United Kingdom, Extant, Extinct, or Dormant. Vol. VI (1st ed.). London: George Bell and Sons. OCLC 1180818801. – N to R (for Ormonde)
- Dee, Darryl (2024). 1709: The Twilight of the Sun King. Rowman & Littlefield. ISBN 978-1-5381-7667-2.
- Davies, J. D. (2004). "Butler, Thomas, sixth earl of Ossory (1634–1680)". In Matthew, Henry Colin Gray.; Harrison, Brian (eds.). Oxford Dictionary of National Biography. Vol. 9. New York: Oxford University Press. pp. 226–229. ISBN 0-19-861359-8. (for his father)
- Debrett, John (1816). Peerage of the United Kingdom of Great Britain and Ireland. Vol. I (10th ed.). London: F. C. and J. Rivington. OCLC 23089464. – England (for his sister Elizabeth, cited in this edition because the corresponding page is missing in the 1828 edition.)
- Debrett, John (1828). Peerage of the United Kingdom of Great Britain and Ireland. Vol. II (17th ed.). London: F. C. and J. Rivington. OCLC 54499602. – Scotland and Ireland
- Desmond, Ray (2007). The History of the Royal Botanic Gardens Kew. London: Kew Publishing. ISBN 978-1-8424-6168-6.
- Dunboyne, Patrick Theobald Tower Butler, Baron (1968). Butler Family History (2nd ed.). Kilkenny: Rothe House.
- Gregg, Edward (1980). Queen Anne. London: Routledge & Kegan Paul. ISBN 0-7100-0400-1.
- Handley, Stuart (2004). "Butler, James, second duke of Ormond (1665–1745)". In Matthew, Henry Colin Gray.; Harrison, Brian (eds.). Oxford Dictionary of National Biography. Vol. 9. New York: Oxford University Press. pp. 163–168. ISBN 0-19-861359-8. (for him)
- Hamilton, Elizabeth (1969). The Backstairs Dragon – a life of Robert Harley, 1st Earl of Oxford. London: Hamish Hamilton. ISBN 0-241-01601-0.
- Historical Manuscripts Commission (HMC) (1902). Calendar of the Stuart Papers. Vol. 1. London: HM Stationery Office. OCLC 1041616450.
- Lodge, John (1789). Archdall, Mervyn (ed.). The Peerage of Ireland or, A Genealogical History of the Present Nobility of that Kingdom. Vol. IV. Dublin: James Moore. OCLC 264906028. – Viscounts (for Ormond under Butler, Viscount Mountgarrett)
- Van Nimwegen, Olaf (2020). De Veertigjarige Oorlog 1672–1712: de strijd van de Nederlanders tegen de Zonnekoning (The 40 Years War 1672–1712: the Dutch struggle against the Sun King) (in Dutch). Prometheus. ISBN 978-90-446-3871-4.
- Smollett, Tobias (1800). The History of England from the revolution to the death of George the Second (Designed as a continuation of Mr. Hume's History). Vol. II (A new ed.). London: T. Cadell. OCLC 6017016. – From the revolution to the death of George II
- Stanhope, Philip Henry (1836). History of England From the Peace of Utrecht to the Peace of Aix-la-Chapelle. Vol. I. London: John Murray. OCLC 5417396. – 1713 to 1748
- Stanhope, Philip Henry (1870). History of England Comprising the Reign of Queen Anne Until the Peace of Utrecht. London: John Murray. OCLC 896128. – 1700 to 1713
- Taylor, William Benjamin Sarsfield (1845). History of the University of Dublin. London: T. Cadell. OCLC 458216575.
- Ward, Adolphus William (1886). "Butler, James, second Duke of Ormonde (1665–1745)". In Lee, Sidney (ed.). Dictionary of National Biography. Vol. VIII. New York: MacMillan and Co. pp. 60–65. OCLC 8544105.
- Wijn, J.W. (1964). Het Staatsche Leger: Deel VIII-3 Het tijdperk van de Spaanse Successieoorlog 1711–1715 (The Dutch States Army: Part VIII-3 The era of the War of the Spanish Succession 1711–1715) (in Dutch). Martinus Nijhoff.
- Wood, Anthony (1790). Fasti Oxonienses. Oxford: Clarendon Press. OCLC 982206292.

=== London Gazette ===
- "No. 2386". The London Gazette. 27 September – 1 October 1688.
- "No. 4948". The London Gazette. 3–5 January 1711.
- "No. 4971". The London Gazette. 26–28 February 1711.
- "No. 4994". The London Gazette. 19–22 April 1712.
- "No. 5112". The London Gazette. 14–18 April 1713.
- "No. 5278". The London Gazette. 16–20 November 1714.
- "No. 5352". The London Gazette. 2–6 August 1715.
- "No. 5357". The London Gazette. 20–23 August 1715.
- "No. 5715". The London Gazette. 24–27 January 1719.
- "No. 5727". The London Gazette. 7–10 March 1719.
- "No. 5799". The London Gazette. 14–17 November 1719.

Political offices
Preceded by The Earl of Rochester	Lord Lieutenant of Ireland; 1703–1707	Succeeded by The Earl of Pembroke and Montgomery
Preceded by The Earl of Wharton	Lord Lieutenant of Ireland; 1710–1713	Succeeded by The Duke of Shrewsbury
Honorary titles
Preceded by The Earl of Dorset	Lord Warden of the Cinque Ports; 1712–1715	Succeeded by The Earl of Leicester
Vacant Title last held by The Duke of Grafton	Lord High Constable of England; 1689	Vacant Title next held by The Duke of Bedford
Preceded by The Marquess of Carmarthen; The Earl of Devonshire; The Earl of Dorset	Lord Lieutenant of Somerset; 1691–1714	Succeeded by The Earl of Orrery
Preceded by The Viscount Townshend	Lord Lieutenant of Norfolk; 1713–1714	Succeeded by The Viscount Townshend
Military offices
Preceded by Regiment raised	Colonel of the Irish Foot Guards; 1662–1688	Succeeded by William Dorrington
Preceded by The Duke of Northumberland	Captain and Colonel of The Queen's Troop of Horse Guards; 1689–1711	Succeeded by The Duke of Northumberland
Preceded by The Duke of Marlborough	Captain-General; 1711–1714	Succeeded by The Duke of Marlborough
Preceded by The Duke of Marlborough	Colonel of the 1st Regiment of Foot Guards; 1712–1714	Succeeded by The Duke of Marlborough
Vacant Title last held by Duke of Marlborough	Commander-in-Chief of the Forces; 1711–1714	Vacant Title next held by The Earl of Stair
Academic offices
Preceded by The Duke of Ormonde	Chancellor of the University of Oxford; 1688–1715	Succeeded by Earl of Arran
Preceded by The 1st Duke of Ormonde	Chancellor of the University of Dublin; 1688–1715	Succeeded by The Prince of Wales
Peerage of England
Preceded by James Butler	Duke of Ormonde; 1688–1715	Forfeit
Preceded by Thomas Butler	Baron Butler; 1680–1715	Forfeit
Peerage of Scotland
Preceded by Elizabeth Butler	Lord Dingwall; 1684–1715	Forfeit
Peerage of Ireland
Preceded by James Butler	Duke of Ormonde; 1688–1745	Succeeded by Charles Butler
Preceded by Thomas Butler	Earl of Ossory; 1680–1745	Succeeded by Charles Butler
