= Antoine de Guiscard =

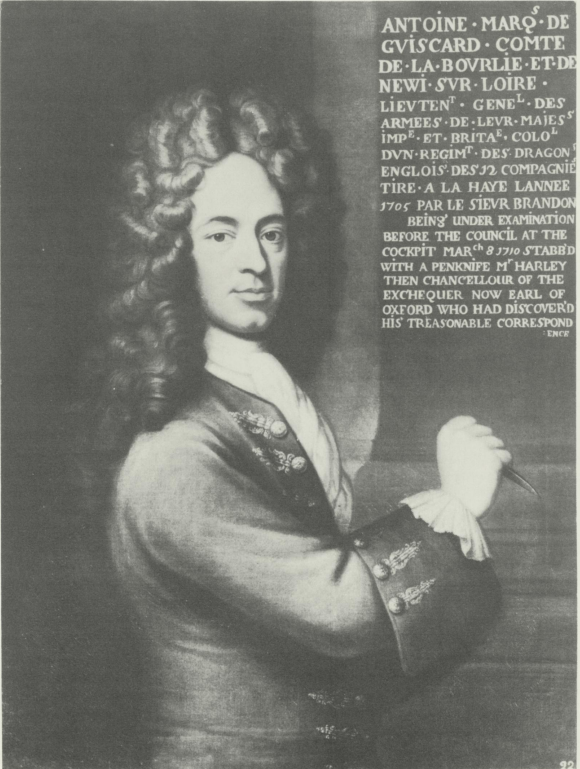

Antoine de Guiscard (1658 – 17 March 1711), also known as the Marquis de Guiscard or the Abbé de la Bourlie, was a French refugee, spy and double agent who attempted to assassinate Robert Harley, a leading British statesman, on 8 March 1711 by stabbing him with a penknife during a Privy Council meeting at Whitehall. His motive is not entirely clear, although he was undoubtedly a double agent who acted as a spy for both French and British governments, and was on the point of being charged with treason by the British authorities. Personal malice against Harley, who was responsible for having Guiscard's English pension cut in half, may also have been a motive.

== Career ==
He was born into a distinguished family, being a younger brother of the Count de Guiscard who was appointed the first French Governor of Namur, although his right to call himself a Marquis has been disputed. He became a priest, but his notorious debauchery made it impossible for him to continue in that calling. He then embarked on a career as a soldier, joining his brother in a number of military campaigns, but was expelled from the French Court for a serious though unspecified offence. In revenge he joined the Camisard rebellion against the French Crown, and when it failed he began wandering around Europe, offering his services to any foreign Court hostile to France.

He arrived in England in 1705, where he attempted to interest the authorities, such as diplomat Richard Hill, in a series of largely impractical schemes to defeat the French. Hill reported that Guiscard would be able to incite revolt among the Catholics in Dauphiné and Languedoc as well as provide access to a host of French agents working under Louis XIV. He further substantiated these claims to Hill by claiming to carry a vial of poison with him in case pursuing agents of the French King found him.

By 1706, he had convinced Queen Anne's government to pay him a pension of 600 guineas as well as entertain the thought of leading an invasion of Normandy in support of the previously mentioned uprising. To this end, he was given command of a regiment to land at Normandy and incite the revolt but the landing ultimately never took place. This, in combination with no meaningful intelligence or impact eventually led to a steady decline of Guiscard's credibility among the British court as well as a decrease in income.

== The attempt on Harley's life ==
In 1711, enraged by his lack of reward, he began a counterplot with the French Crown, which was quickly detected, leading to his arrest and his appearance before the Council, where he attempted to kill Harley. Why he was allowed into the Council meeting carrying a knife is unknown: the most likely explanation is that he had not been searched thoroughly enough, as the British Government at the time was surprisingly lax about security.

Harley, though stabbed and bruised, recovered: his survival was generally attributed to the fact that he was wearing an ornate gold brocade waistcoat, which acted as a shield against the penknife. In the ensuing fracas Guiscard was attacked by several members of the Council and fatally wounded, most likely by James Butler, 2nd Duke of Ormonde. Guiscard implored Ormonde to finish the deed, but Ormonde refused, saying that it was not for him to cheat the hangman. Belatedly the Council realised that Guiscard should be kept alive for questioning, and some effort was made to preserve his life, but he died just over a week later in Newgate Prison.

The unsuccessful attempt to murder Harley had major political consequences. Harley's popularity, which had been on the decline, recovered at once, as a wave of rejoicing at his survival swept the country, and even his enemies praised his courage in the face of danger.
