= Emilia Butler, Countess of Ossory =

Anglo-Dutch courtier

The Countess of Ossory
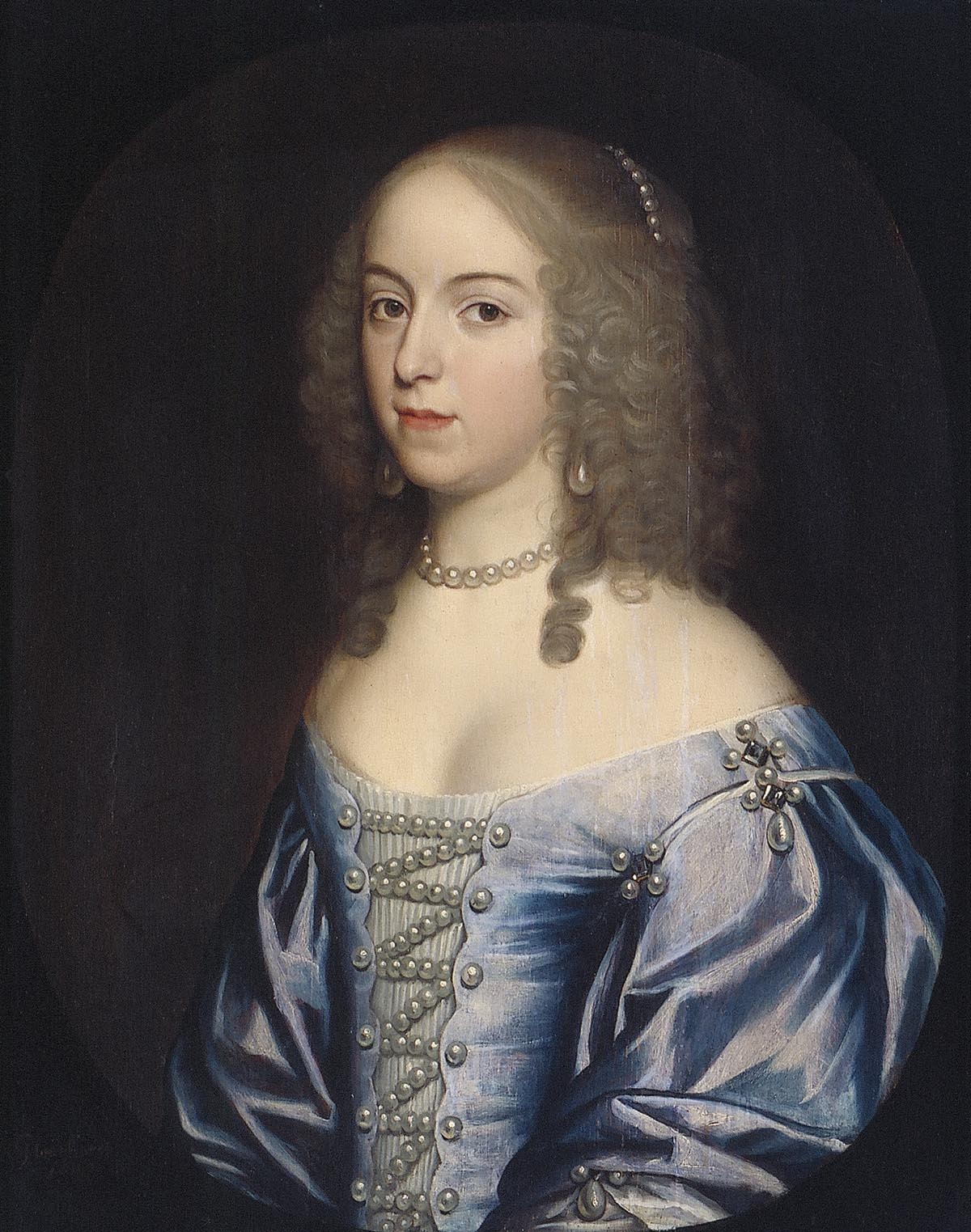
- Portrait of Emilia Butler, Countess of Ossory (1602–1665), 1649.
- Born: 4 March 1635
- Died: 12 December 1688 (aged 53)
- Spouse: Thomas Butler, 6th Earl of Ossory
- Issue: 11, including James, Charles, Elizabeth and Henrietta
- Father: Louis of Nassau-Beverweerd
- Mother: Isabella of Hornes

Emilia Butler, Countess of Ossory (4 March 1635 (baptised) – 12 December 1688 (buried)), born Æmilia van Nassau-Beverweerd, was an Anglo-Dutch courtier.

== Biography ==
Emilia was born in The Hague, the daughter of Lodewijk van Nassau, Lord of Beverweerd, the Governor of 's-Hertogenbosch, and his wife, Isabella, Countess of Hornes. Her elder sister, Issbella van Nassau-Beverweerd (1631–1717), became the wife of the prominent Stuart politician Henry Bennet, 1st Earl of Arlington and was also a Lady in the household of Catherine of Braganza; her brother was the Dutch field marshal Hendrik Van Nassau-Ouwerkerk.

Emilia was married in Den Bosch in the Netherlands on 14 November 1659 to Thomas Butler, viscount Thurles (1633–1680), the eldest son and heir of the Irish peer James Butler, 1st Duke of Ormonde, and accompanied him to England, where she was naturalised by Act of Parliament (1660). Lord Thurles became earl of Ossory several years later when his father achieved the dukedom (1662).

The countess was presented to Catherine of Braganza, the wife of Charles II of England upon her arrival in London and was appointed as lady-in-waiting to the queen at Hampton Court Palace. She attended the queen at Greenwich Palace when the latter met her mother-in-law, Queen Henrietta Maria, for the first time (August 1662).

During the outbreak of the plague (1665) the countess accompanied the queen and her household to the safety of Hampton Court, later removing to Oxford. She accompanied the king and queen to Dover to farewell the Duchesse d'Orleans on her final visit (June 1670). During the plots directed against the queen and other prominent Catholic figures, the countess and others of the queen's ladies came under the suspicion of being secret papists (1678).

Lady Ossory served Queen Catherine for over twenty years, retiring from service after the death of Charles II (1685). A famous beauty, her portrait was painted by Wissing. She was buried in Westminster Abbey in London on 12 December 1688.

== Children ==
Her children included:

- James Butler, 2nd Duke of Ormonde (1665–1745), who succeeded his grandfather;
- Charles Butler, third Duke of Ormonde (1671–1758), who succeeded his brother;
- Lady Elizabeth Butler (1660–1717), who married William Richard George Stanley, 9th Earl of Derby;
- Lady Henrietta Butler (died 11 October 1724), who married her cousin Henry de Nassau d'Auverquerque, 1st Earl of Grantham

== Sources ==
- Chester, Joseph Lemuel (1876), Registers of Westminster Abbey, London: Private Edition
- G. E. Cokayne, The Complete Peerage (1910–1959) (Ormonde).
- A. Strickland, Lives of the Queens of England, London (1888) (under "Catharine of Braganza")
