= Francis Cowper, 7th Earl Cowper =

British Liberal politician

The Right Honourable The Earl Cowper KG PC DL
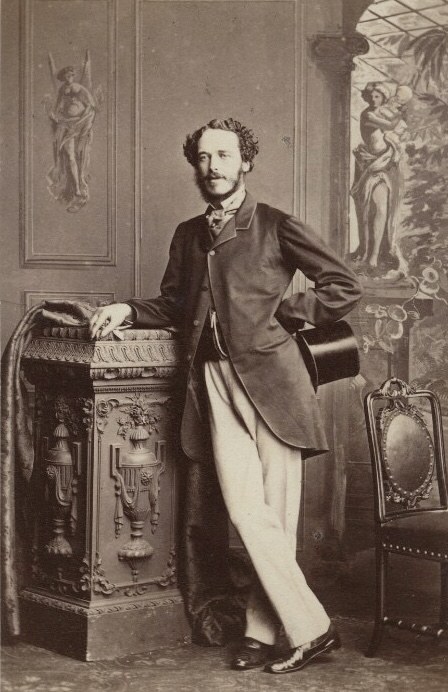

Lord Lieutenant of Ireland
- In office 4 May 1880 – 4 May 1882
- Monarch: Victoria
- Prime Minister: William Ewart Gladstone
- Preceded by: The Duke of Marlborough
- Succeeded by: Lord Spencer

Personal details
- Born: 11 June 1834
- Died: 18 July 1905 (aged 71)
- Party: Liberal
- Spouse: Lady Katrine Compton
- Parent(s): George Cowper, 6th Earl Cowper; Anne de Grey
- Education: University of Oxford

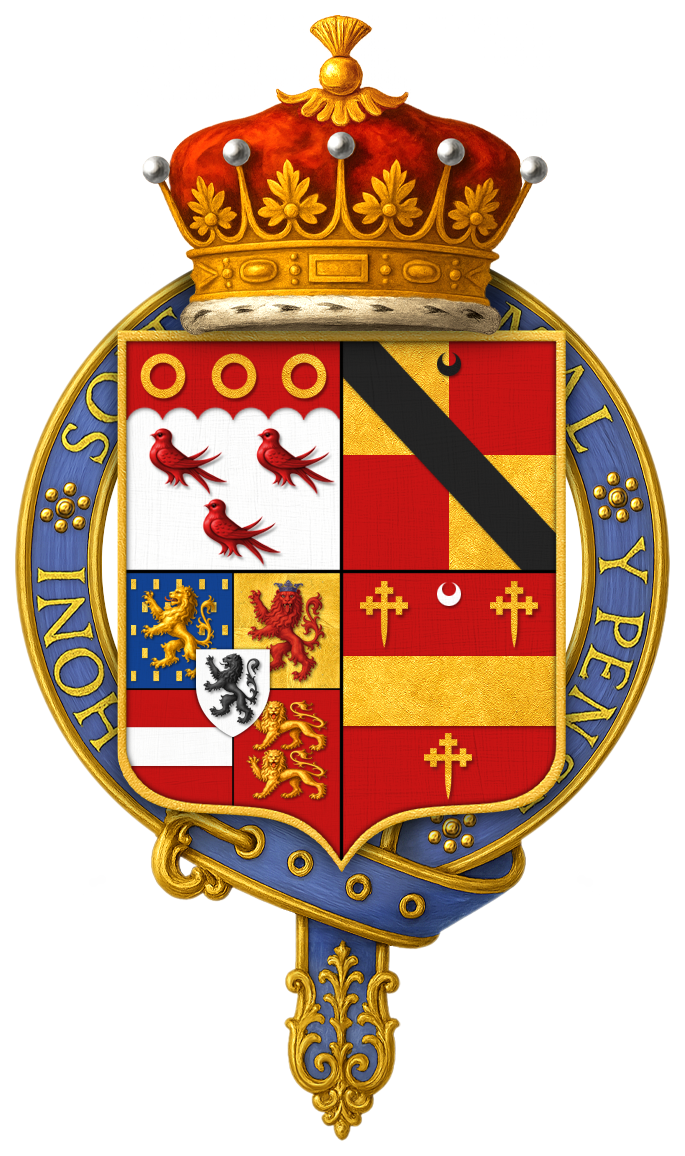
Quartered arms of Francis Cowper, 7th Earl Cowper, KG, PC, DL

Francis Thomas de Grey Cowper, 7th Earl Cowper (11 June 1834 – 18 July 1905), known as Viscount Fordwich from 1837 to 1856, was a British Liberal politician. He was Lord Lieutenant of Ireland from 1880 to 1882.

== Background ==
Cowper (pronounced "Cooper") was the eldest son of George Cowper, 6th Earl Cowper, by his wife Anne de Grey, 7th holder of the barony of Lucas of Crudwell, daughter of Thomas de Grey, 2nd Earl de Grey. He was educated at Harrow School and the University of Oxford.

He was commissioned a cornet in the Yorkshire Hussars on 19 February 1852. On 22 November 1855, his father appointed him a deputy lieutenant of Kent.

== Political career ==
Cowper entered the House of Lords on his father's death in 1856 and served under William Ewart Gladstone as Captain of the Honourable Corps of Gentlemen-at-Arms (Government Chief Whip in the House of Lords) from 1871 to 1874 and as Lord Lieutenant of Ireland from 1880 to 1882. He became a Knight of the Garter in 1865 and was admitted to the Privy Council in 1871.

== Other public positions ==
Apart from his political career Cowper held the position of Lord Lieutenant of Bedfordshire between 1861 and 1905. He was also a Deputy Lieutenant of Nottinghamshire and Kent.

== Peerages ==
In 1871, Cowper managed to obtain a reversal of the attainder of the Scottish lordship of Dingwall and the English barony of Butler, which had been under attainder since 1715, and he became the 4th Lord Dingwall and the 3rd Baron Butler as well. In 1880, he succeeded his mother as 8th Baron Lucas.

== Relative wealth ==
He came to own more than £1M of assets which Sir Leo Chiozza Money, an analyst of the rich of the era, estimated was true of only eight British people who died "in an average year". He owned almost 38,000 acres.

== Family ==
Lord Cowper married Lady Katrine Compton, daughter of William Compton, 4th Marquess of Northampton, in 1870. The marriage was childless. Cowper died in July 1905, aged 71. On his death, the baronetcy of Ratlingcourt, barony of Cowper, viscountcy of Fordwich and earldom of Cowper became extinct. He was succeeded in the barony of Lucas of Crudwell and the lordship of Dingwall by his nephew, Auberon.

His probate was resworn as per the official Calendar in 1905 at £1,326,681 (equivalent to about £139,500,000 in 2025). Because Lord Cowper died childless and there were no other male-line descendants of the first Earl Cowper at the time of his death, his wealth mainly devolved to issue of his three married sisters (Lady Florence Herbert, Lady Adine Fane and Lady Amabel Kerr)

- Florence's son, Auberon, succeeded his uncle in the barony of Lucas of Crudwell and the lordship of Dingwall and also inherited the de Grey part of the Cowper estates including Wrest Park in Bedfordshire
- Adine's daughter and only surviving child, Ethel, being Lord Cowper's ward and favourite niece, inherited Panshanger, the Cowper's main country seat in Hertfordshire
- Amabel's descendants, who later succeeded as Marquesses of Lothian, inherited the Melbourne part of the Cowper estates including Brocket Hall in Hertfordshire and Melbourne Hall in Derbyshire

Political offices
Preceded by The Marquess of Normanby	Captain of the Gentlemen-at-Arms; 1871–1874	Succeeded by The Earl of Ilchester
Preceded by The Duke of Marlborough	Lord Lieutenant of Ireland; 1880–1882	Succeeded by The Earl Spencer
Honorary titles
Preceded by The Duke of Bedford	Lord Lieutenant of Bedfordshire; 1861–1905	Succeeded by The Lord St John of Bletso
Baronetage of England
Preceded by George Cowper	Baronet; 1880–1905	Extinct
Peerage of England
Preceded by Anne Cowper	Baron Lucas; 1880–1905	Succeeded by Auberon Herbert
Vacant Attainder Title last held by James Butler	Baron Butler; 1871–1905	In abeyance
Preceded by George Cowper	Baron Cowper; 1856–1905	Extinct
Peerage of Scotland
Vacant Attainder Title last held by James Butler	Lord Dingwall; 1871–1905	Succeeded by Auberon Herbert
Peerage of Great Britain
Preceded by George Cowper	Earl Cowper; 1856–1905	Extinct
