= Elizabeth Butler, Countess of Derby =

English court official

The Right Honourable The Countess of Derby
- Born: 1660
- Died: 1717 (aged 56–57)
- Spouse: William Stanley, 9th Earl of Derby
- Issue: James Stanley, Lord Strange; Henrietta, Countess of Anglesey; Lady Elizabeth Stanley
- Father: Thomas Butler, 6th Earl of Ossory
- Mother: Emilia van Nassau-Beverweerd

Elizabeth Stanley, Countess of Derby (née Lady Elizabeth Butler; 1660–1717) was an English court official. She served as Mistress of the Robes to queen Mary II of England between 1689 and 1694.

She was the daughter of Thomas Butler, 6th Earl of Ossory and Emilia van Nassau-Beverweerd. She married William Stanley, 9th Earl of Derby, in 1673.

When the household of queen Mary II was officially formed, Elizabeth Butler was appointed on 22 April 1689 to the position of principal lady-in-waiting with the title Groom of the Stole and Mistress of the Robes. She was given a salary of £1,200 per annum (£800 as groom of the stole, and £400 as mistress of the Robes).

Following the death of her husband, she was engaged in a Chancery case with his brother and her two daughters Henrietta and Elizabeth concerning her dower.

== Sources ==
- G. E. Cokayne, The Complete Peerage (1910–1959) (Ormonde).
- A. Strickland, Lives of the Queens of England, London (1888)
- https://courtofficers.ctsdh.luc.edu/MaryII.list.pdf

Court offices
| Preceded by The Countess of Denbigh | Mistress of the Robes to Queen Mary II; 1689–1694 | Succeeded by The Countess of Marlborough |
