= James Butler, 1st Duke of Ormond =

Anglo-Irish viceroy (1610–1688)

Lieutenant-General His Grace The Duke of Ormond KG
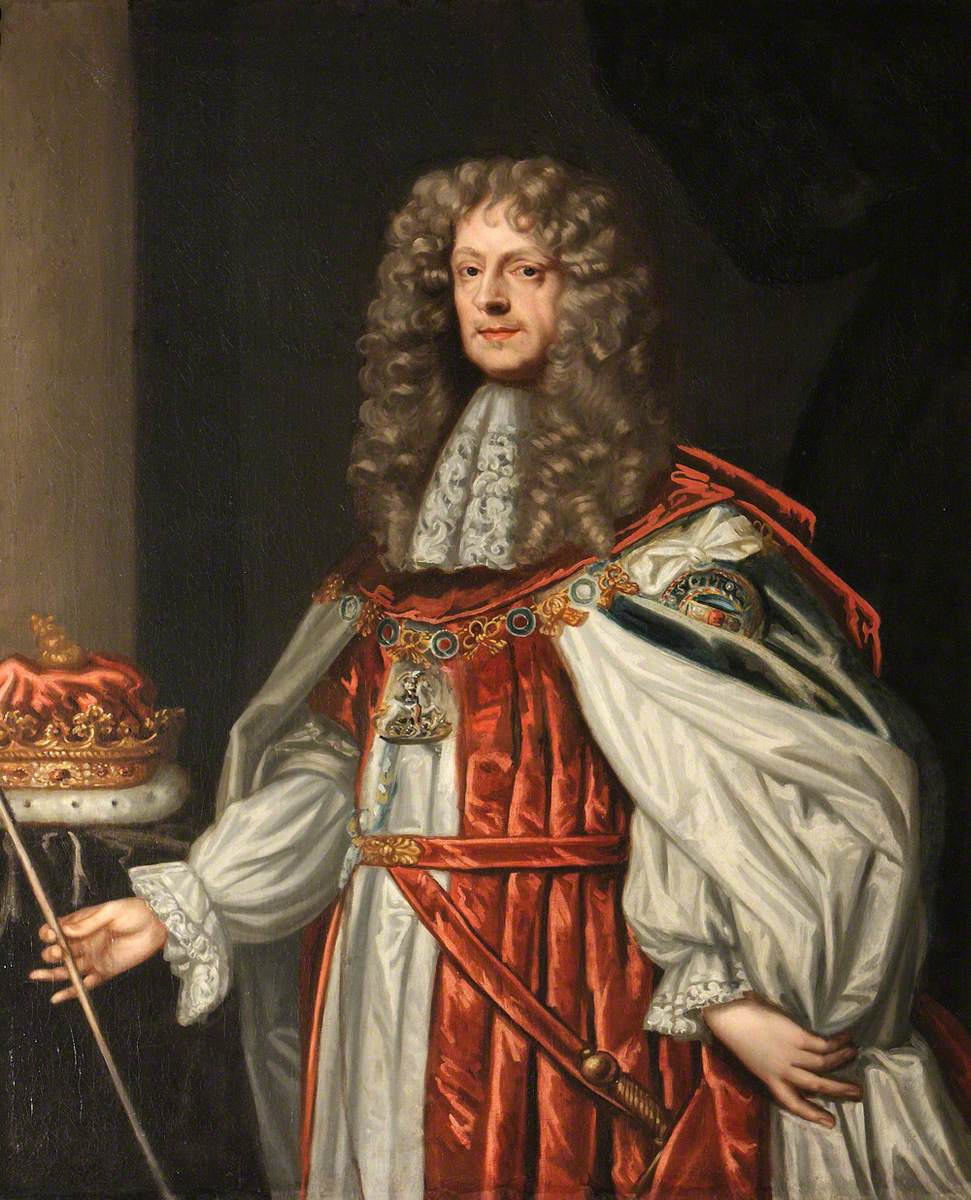
- Portrait by Peter Lely

Chancellor of the University of Oxford
- In office 4 August 1669 – 1688
- Preceded by: Gilbert Sheldon
- Succeeded by: The 2nd Duke of Ormond

Lord High Steward
- In office 29 May 1660 – 13 February 1689
- Monarchs: Charles II, James II
- Preceded by: The 1st Duke of Richmond
- Succeeded by: The 1st Duke of Devonshire

Lord Lieutenant of Ireland
- In office 24 May 1677 – 24 February 1685
- Monarch: Charles II
- Preceded by: The 1st Earl of Essex
- Succeeded by: The 2nd Earl of Clarendon
- In office 21 February 1662 – 7 February 1668
- Monarch: Charles II
- Preceded by: The 1st Duke of Albemarle
- Succeeded by: The 6th Earl of Ossory
- In office 30 September 1648 – 22 June 1649
- Monarch: Charles I
- Preceded by: Viscount Lisle
- Succeeded by: Oliver Cromwell
- In office 13 November 1643 – 9 April 1646
- Monarch: Charles I
- Preceded by: The 2nd Earl of Leicester
- Succeeded by: Viscount Lisle

Personal details
- Born: 19 October 1610 Clerkenwell, London, England
- Died: 21 July 1688 (aged 77) Kingston Lacy, Dorset, England
- Resting place: Westminster Abbey, London
- Spouse: Elizabeth Preston, Baroness Dingwall
- Children: Thomas, Richard, Elizabeth, John, Mary, & others
- Parent(s): Thomas, Viscount Thurles; Elizabeth, Lady Thurles
- Education: Trinity College Dublin

Military service
- Branch/service: English Army; Irish Confederates
- Years of service: 1639–1651
- Rank: Commander-in-chief, General, Commandant
- Battles/wars: Wars of the Three Kingdoms (1639—1651) Second Bishops' War, 1st Siege of Drogheda, Battle of Kilrush, Battle of New Ross, Battle of Rathmines, 2nd Siege of Drogheda.

Lieutenant-General James FitzThomas Butler, 1st Duke of Ormond, KG, PC (19 October 1610 – 21 July 1688), was an Anglo-Irish statesman and soldier, known as Earl of Ormond from 1634 to 1642 and Marquess of Ormond from 1642 to 1661. (Note: The Oxford Dictionary of National Biography spells his title Ormond, the older Dictionary of National Biography spells it Ormonde.(Barnard 2004)(Airy 1886)) Following the failure of the senior line of the Butler family, he was the second representative of the Kilcash branch to inherit the earldom.

His friend, the Earl of Strafford, secured his appointment as commander of the government army in Ireland. Following the outbreak of the Irish Rebellion of 1641, he led government forces against the Irish Catholic Confederation; when the First English Civil War began in August 1642, he supported the Royalists and in 1643 negotiated a ceasefire with the Confederation which allowed his troops to be transferred to England. Shortly before the Execution of Charles I in January 1649, he agreed the Second Ormonde Peace, an alliance between the Confederation and Royalist forces which fought against the Cromwellian conquest of Ireland.

During the 1650s he lived in exile on the continent with Charles II of England. After the Stuart Restoration in 1660, Ormond became a major figure in English and Irish politics, holding many high government offices such as Chancellor of the University of Oxford.

== Birth and origins ==
James was born on 19 October 1610 at Clerkenwell, London, the eldest son of Thomas Butler and his wife Elizabeth Pointz. His father, who was known by the courtesy title of Viscount Thurles, was the eldest son and heir apparent of Walter Butler, 11th Earl of Ormond, called "Walter of the rosary beads". His father's family, the Butler dynasty, was Old English and descended from Theobald Walter, who had been appointed Chief Butler of Ireland by King Henry II in 1177.

James's mother, Lady Thurles, was English and Catholic, a daughter of Sir John Pointz - of Iron Acton, Gloucestershire - and his second wife Elizabeth Sydenham. James's birth house in Clerkenwell belonged to him, his maternal grandfather.

James was one of seven siblings, three brothers and four sisters, who are listed in his father's Wikipedia entry. James was not only the eldest son but also the first-born as his eldest sister was born after him in 1612.

== Early life ==
Shortly after his birth his parents returned to Ireland where they were welcome to Black Tom (the 10th Earl of Ormond) but not to Walter, his heir apparent, who had opposed James's father's marriage into the English Poyntz family, who were Catholic but only gentry.

Black Tom died on 22 November 1614. James's grandfather Walter succeeded as the 11th Earl and James's father became heir apparent with the courtesy title of Viscount Thurles. While the title was secure, the Ormond lands were claimed by Richard Preston, 1st Earl of Desmond, who had married Elizabeth, Black Tom's only surviving child.

In 1619 his father perished on his way from Ireland to England in a shipwreck near the Skerries off the coast of Anglesey. James inherited his father's courtesy title Viscount Thurles. The year following that disaster, his mother brought young Thurles, as he now was, back to England, and placed him, then nine years old, at school with a Catholic gentleman at Finchley — this doubtless through the influence of his grandfather, the 11th Earl. His mother remarried to George Mathew of Thurles.

On 26 May 1623, King James I, made Thurles a ward of Richard Preston, Earl of Desmond, and placed him at Lambeth, London, under the care of George Abbot, archbishop of Canterbury to be brought up as a Protestant. The Ormond estates being under sequestration, the young Lord had but £40 a year for his own and his servants' clothing and expenses. He seems to have been neglected by the Archbishop — "he was not instructed even in humanity, nor so much as taught to understand Latin".

When fifteen Thurles went to live with his paternal grandfather (then released from prison) at Drury Lane. His grandfather, the 11th Earl of Ormond, was now an old man and did not interfere much with his Protestant religious education. This was very important for Thurles's future life, as it meant that, unlike almost all his relatives in the Butler dynasty, he was a Protestant. This strained his relationship with the rest of his family and dependants, as they suffered from land confiscations and legal discrimination on account of their religion, while he did not.

Now having more means at his command, Thurles entered into all the gaieties of the court and town. At eighteen he went to Portsmouth with his friend George Villiers, Duke of Buckingham intending to join the expedition for the relief of La Rochelle; a project abandoned upon the Duke's assassination.

It was during his London residence that he set himself to learn Irish, a partial knowledge of which proved most useful to him in after years.

== Marriage and children ==
About six months after his visit to Portsmouth, Thurles first saw at Court, and fell in love with, his cousin Lady Elizabeth Preston, only child and heiress of Richard Preston, Earl of Desmond and his wife Elizabeth. Charles I gave his consent by letters patent, on 8 September 1629. At Christmas 1629, they married putting an end to the long-standing quarrel between the families and united their estates, one of which was Kilkenny Castle

Family tree

James Butler with wife, parents, and other selected relatives. (Note: This family tree is partly derived from the condensed Butler family tree pictured in Dunboyne. Also see the lists of siblings and children in the text.)

Walter; 11th Earl; 1559 – 1632/3 'Beads'	Helen; Butler d. 1631
Thomas; Viscount; Thurles d. 1619 d.v.p.*	Elizabeth; Pointz; 1587–1673
James; 1st Duke; Ormond; 1610–1688	Elizabeth; Preston; 1615–1684	Richard of Kilcash; 1615–1701
Thomas; 6th Earl; Ossory; 1633–1680 d.v.p.*	Emilia von Nassau; 1635–1688	Philip; Stanhope; 2nd Earl; Chesterfield; 1634–1714	Elizabeth; Butler; 1640–1665
James; 2nd Duke; Ormond; 1665–1745	Charles; 1st Earl; Arran; 1671–1758	Elizabeth; Butler d. 1717	Elizabeth; Stanhope; 1663–1723

Legend

XXX	Subject of the article	XXX	Earls & dukes of Ormond	XXX	Earls of Clancarty

*d.v.p. = predeceased his father (decessit vita patris)

James and Elizabeth had eight sons, five of whom died in childhood, and two daughters. Five children survived into adulthood:

1. Thomas (1634–1680), predeceased his father, but had a son who would become the 2nd Duke
2. Richard (1639–1686), became first and last Earl of Arran of the 1662 creation and predeceased his father
3. Elizabeth (1640–1665), married Philip Stanhope, 2nd Earl of Chesterfield and had affairs with James Hamilton and the Duke of York, the future James II of England
4. John (1643–1677), became the Earl of Gowran
5. Mary (1646–1710), married William Cavendish, 1st Duke of Devonshire

== With Strafford ==
Thurles's career began in 1633 with the appointment as head of government in Ireland of Thomas Wentworth, the future Earl of Strafford, by whom Ormond was treated with great favour. Writing to Charles I, Wentworth described Ormond as "young, but take it from me, a very staid head".

On 24 February 1633, Thurles, on the death of his grandfather, succeeded to the earldom as the 12th Earl of Ormond. Lord Ormond, as he now was, became Wentworth's chief friend and supporter. In January 1635 he became a member of the Irish Privy Council. Wentworth planned large-scale confiscations of Catholic-owned land, both to raise money for the crown and to break the political power of the Irish Catholic gentry, a policy which Ormond supported. Yet, it infuriated his relatives, and drove many of them into opposition to Wentworth and ultimately into armed rebellion. In 1640, with Wentworth having been recalled to attend to the Second Bishops' War in England, Ormond was made commander-in-chief of the forces in Ireland. The opposition to Wentworth ultimately aided impeachment of the Earl by the English Parliament, and his eventual execution in May 1641.

== Rebellion and Civil War ==
=== Fighting the rebellion and the Confederates ===
On the outbreak of the Irish Rebellion of 1641, Ormond found himself in command of the Irish Royal Army based in Dublin. Most of the country was taken by the Catholic rebels, who included Ormond's Butler relatives. However, Ormond's bonds of kinship were not entirely severed. His wife and children were escorted from Kilkenny to Dublin under the order of the rebel leader Richard Butler, 3rd Viscount Mountgarret, another member of the Butler dynasty.

Early in 1642 the Irish Catholics formed their own government, the Catholic Confederation, with its capital at Kilkenny, and began to raise their own regular troops, more organised and capable than the feudal militias of the 1641 rebellion. Also in early 1642, the king sent in troop reinforcements from England and Scotland. The Irish Confederate War was underway. Ormond mounted several expeditions from Dublin in 1642 that cleared the area around Dublin of Confederate forces. He secured control of the Pale, and re-supplied some outlying garrisons, without serious contest. The Lords Justices, Sir William Parsons, 1st Baronet of Bellamont and Sir John Borlase, who suspected him because he was related to many of the Confederate leaders, recalled him from command, but he succeeded securing much of County Kildare in February 1642. Next, he managed to lift the siege of Drogheda in March 1642. In April he relieved the royalist garrisons at Naas, Athy and Maryborough, and on his return to Dublin he won the Battle of Kilrush against a larger force. On 30 August 1642 he was created Marquess of Ormond. He received the public thanks of the English Parliament and a monetary reward, and in September 1642 was put in command with a commission direct from the king.

In March 1643, Ormond ventured with his troops to New Ross, County Wexford, deep in the territory of the Catholic Confederation, and won a small but indecisive victory there (Battle of New Ross) before returning to Dublin. Nevertheless, Ormond was in a difficult situation. The Confederates held two-thirds of the island. The English Civil War, which started in September 1642, had removed the prospect of more reinforcements and supplies from England, and indeed the king desired to recall troops. In addition, the Scots Covenanters, who had landed an army in the northeast of Ireland at Carrickfergus to counter the Catholic rebellion in that part of the country in early 1642, had subsequently put northeast Ireland on the side of the English Parliamentarians against the king; and the relatively strong Protestant presence in and around Derry and Cork City was inclined to side with the Parliamentarians as well, and soon did so.

=== Ormond Cessation ===
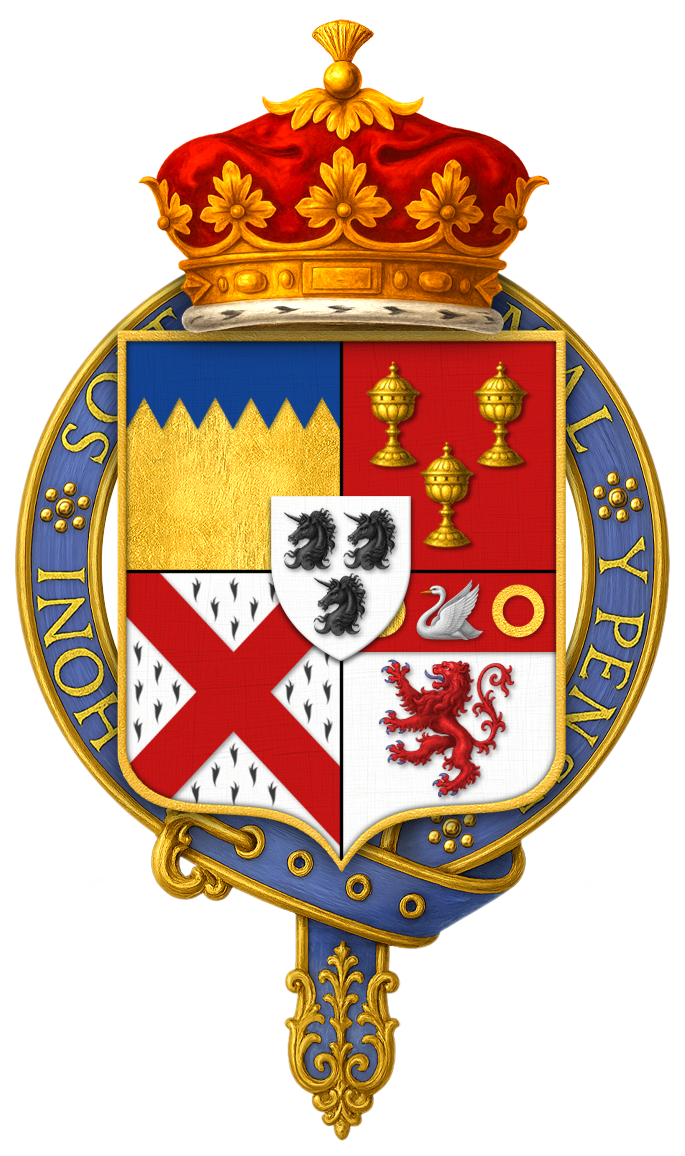
Quartered arms of James Butler, 1st Duke of Ormonde, KG

Isolated in Dublin in what was now a three-sided contest, with the king desiring to reduce the Irish Royal Army, Ormond negotiated a "cessation" or ceasefire for a year with the Confederates. The truce began on 15 September 1643, By this treaty the greater part of Ireland was given up into the hands of the Catholic Confederation (leaving only districts in the north, the Dublin Pale, round Cork City, and certain smallish garrisons in the possession of Protestant commanders). This truce was vehemently opposed by the Lords Justices and the Protestant community in general in Ireland.

Soon afterwards, in November 1643, by the King's orders, Ormond dispatched a body of his troops into England to fight on the Royalist side in the Civil War, estimated at 4,000 troops, half of whom were sent from Cork. In November 1643 the king appointed Ormond as Lord Lieutenant of Ireland. He was sworn in on 21 January 1644. The previous occupant of this post, Robert Sidney, 2nd Earl of Leicester, had never set foot in Ireland. Ormond's assigned mission was to prevent the king's Parliamentarian enemies from being reinforced from Ireland, and to aim to deliver more troops to fight for the Royalists in England. To these ends, he was instructed to do all in his power to keep the Scottish Covenanter army in the north of Ireland occupied. He was also given the king's authority to negotiate a treaty with the Catholic Confederation that could allow their troops to be redirected against the Parliamentarians. In August 1644, the cessation with the Confederates was extended for another year.

=== Negotiations with the Irish Confederates ===
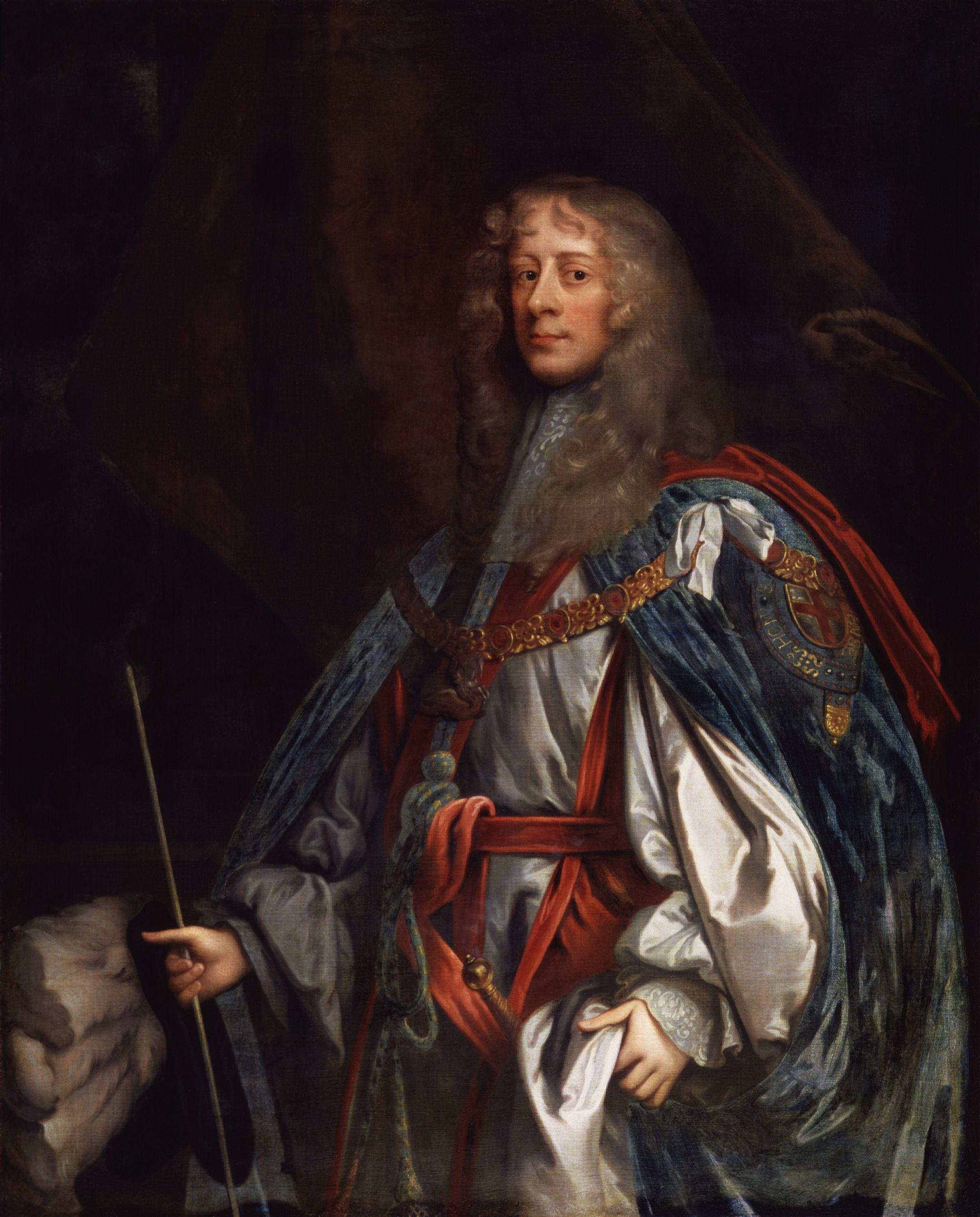
Ormond as Knight of the Garter, wearing the collar and the mantle. The hat with its ostrich feathers appears behind his right hand. Painted by Sir Peter Lely (c. 1665).

Ormond was faced with the difficult task of reconciling the various factions in Ireland. The Old (native) Irish and Catholic Irish of English descent ("Old English") were represented in Confederate Ireland—essentially an independent Catholic government based in Kilkenny—who wanted to come to terms with King Charles I of England in return for religious toleration and self-government. On the other side, any concession that Ormond made to the Confederates weakened his support among English and Scottish Protestants in Ireland. Ormond's negotiations with the Confederates were therefore tortuous, even though many of the Confederate leaders were his relatives or friends.

In 1644, he assisted Randall Macdonnell, 1st Marquess of Antrim in mounting an Irish Confederate expedition into Scotland. The force, led by Alasdair MacColla was sent to help the Scottish Royalists and sparked off a civil war in Scotland (1644–45). This turned out to be the only intervention of Irish Catholic troops in Britain during the Civil Wars.

On 25 August 1645, Edward Somerset, Earl of Glamorgan, acting on behalf of King Charles, signed a treaty in Kilkenny with the Irish Catholic Confederates without first airing the terms of the treaty with the Irish Protestant community. Irish Protestant opposition turned out to be so intense, that Charles was forced to repudiate the treaty almost immediately out of fear of ceding almost all Irish Protestant support to the other side in the English civil war.

On 21 October 1645 Giovanni Battista Rinuccini, the papal nuncio landed in Ireland. On 28 March 1646, Ormond, on behalf of the king, concluded the First Ormond Peace, another treaty with the Confederates that granted religious concessions and removed various grievances. However, the Confederates' General Assembly in Kilkenny rejected the deal, partly due to the influence of the pope's ambassador (nuncio) Giovanni Battista Rinuccini, who worked to dissuade the Catholics from entering into a compromise. The Confederates called off their truce with Ormond, and arrested those among their number who had signed the treaty with Ormond.

Ormond then judged that he could not hold Dublin against the Confederates. He, therefore, applied to the English Long Parliament and signed a treaty with them on 19 June 1647 delivering Dublin into the hands of the Parliamentarians on terms that protected the interests of both royalist Protestants and Roman Catholics who had not actually entered into rebellion. At the beginning of August 1647, Ormond handed over Dublin, together with 3000 royalist troops under his command, to the Parliamentarian commander Michael Jones, who had recently arrived from England with 5000 Parliamentarian troops. Ormond in turn sailed for England on 28 July 1647, remarking of his surrender that he "preferred English rebels to Irish ones". On 8 August 1647 the combined royalist and parliamentarian troops won the major Battle of Dungan's Hill against the Confederates.

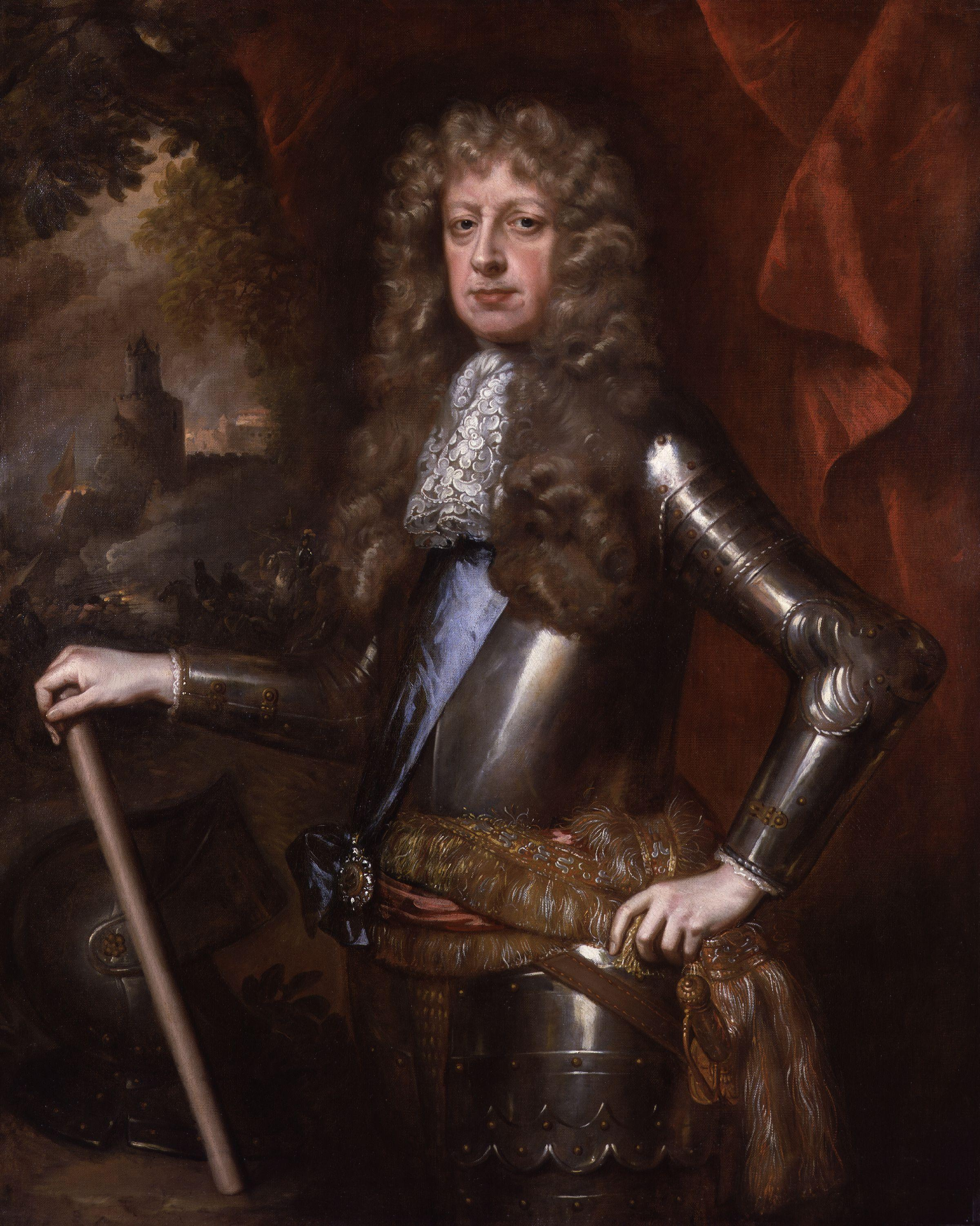
The Duke of Ormond by William Wissing (c. 1680–1685)

=== First exile ===
Ormond attended King Charles during August and October 1647 at Hampton Court Palace, but in March 1648, in order to avoid arrest by the parliament, he joined the Queen and the Prince of Wales at Paris.

=== Commander of Royalist Alliance ===
In September of the same year, the pope's nuncio having been expelled, and affairs otherwise looking favourable, he returned to Ireland arriving at Cork on 29 September 1648. His aim was to unite all parties for the king.

The Irish Confederates were now much more amenable to compromise, as 1647 had seen a series of military disasters for them at the hands of English Parliamentarian forces. On 17 January 1649 Ormond concluded a peace with the rebels on the basis of the free exercise of their religion.

On the execution of Charles I, he proclaimed his loyalty to Charles II, who made him a Knight of the Garter in September 1649. Ormond was placed in command of the Irish Confederates' armies and also English Royalist troops who were landed in Ireland from France.

However, despite controlling almost all of Ireland before August 1649, Ormond was unable to prevent the conquest of Ireland by Cromwell in 1649–50. Ormond tried to retake Dublin by laying siege to the city in the summer of 1649, but was routed at the Battle of Rathmines in August. Subsequently, he tried to halt Cromwell by holding a line of fortified towns across the country. However, the New Model Army took them one after the other, beginning with the Siege of Drogheda in September 1649.

Ormond lost most of the English and Protestant Royalist troops under his command when they mutinied and went over to Cromwell in May 1650. This left him with only the Irish Catholic forces, who distrusted him greatly. Ormond was ousted from his command in late 1650.

=== Second exile ===
He left Ireland for France sailing from Galway on 7 December 1650, but stopped over at Gleninagh Castle, on the southern shore of the Bay of Galway, from where he then started his passage to France on 11 December. He sailed on a small frigate, the Elizabeth, which the Duke of York had sent him from Jersey. Caught in winter storms, they reached Perros in Brittany after three weeks. Ormond was accompanied among others by Inchiquin, Bellings and Daniel O'Neill.

A synod held at the Augustinian abbey in Jamestown, County Leitrim, repudiated Ormond and excommunicated his followers. In Cromwell's Act of Settlement of 1652, all of Ormond's lands in Ireland were confiscated and he was excepted from the pardon given to those Royalists who had surrendered by that date. His name heads the list of over 100 men who were excluded from pardon.

Ormond, though desperately short of money, was in constant attendance on Charles II and the Queen Mother in Paris, and accompanied the King to Aix and Cologne when he was expelled from France by the terms of Mazarin's treaty with Cromwell in 1655. In April 1656 Ormond was one of two signatories who agreed the Treaty of Brussels, securing an alliance for the Royalists with the Spanish court. In 1658, he went disguised, and at great risk, on a secret mission into England to gain trustworthy intelligence as to the chances of an uprising. He attended the king at Fuenterrabia in 1659, had an interview with Mazarin, and was actively engaged in the secret transactions immediately preceding the Restoration. Relations between Ormond and the Queen Mother became increasingly strained; when she remarked that "if she had been trusted, the King had now been in England", Ormond retorted that "if she had never been trusted, the King had never been out of England".

== Restoration career ==
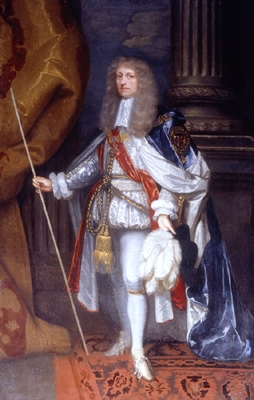
The Duke of Ormond as Knight of the Garter, wearing the mantle, with its cordon and tassels, and the collar. The hat with its white ostrich feathers is in his left hand. Painted by John Michael Wright (c. 1680).

Lord Ormond (Restoration of Lands, etc., in Ireland) Act 1660
- Act of Parliament
- Parliament of England
- Long title: An Act for restoreing unto James Marquesse of Ormond all his Honours Mannours Land and Tenements in Ireland whereof he was in Possession on the twenty-third Day of October one thousand six hundred forty-one, or at any Time since.
- Citation: 12 Cha. 2. c. 15 Pr. (Note: This is the citation in The Statutes of the Realm.); 12 Cha. 2. c. 7 (Note: This is the citation in The Statutes at Large.)
- Territorial extent: England and Wales

Dates
- Royal assent: 28 July 1660
- Commencement: 25 April 1660 (Note: Start of session.)
- Repealed: 16 June 1977
Other legislation
Repealed by	Statute Law (Repeals) Act 1977

Status: Repealed

Text of statute as originally enacted

On the return of Charles to England as King in 1660, Ormond was appointed a commissioner for the treasury and the navy, made Lord Steward of the Household, a Privy Councillor, Lord Lieutenant of Somerset (an office which he resigned in 1672), High Steward of Westminster, Kingston and Bristol, chancellor of Trinity College Dublin, Baron Butler of Llanthony and Earl of Brecknock in the peerage of England; and on 30 March 1661 he was created Duke of Ormond in the Irish peerage and made Lord High Steward of England, for Charles's coronation that year. At the same time, he recovered his enormous estates in Ireland, and large grants in recompense of the fortune he had spent in the royal service were made to him by the king, while in the following year the Irish Parliament presented him with £30,000. His losses, however, according to Carte, exceeded his gains by nearly a million pounds. See also Act of Settlement 1662.

On 4 November 1661, he once more received the lord lieutenancy of Ireland, and busily engaged in the work of settling that country. The main problem was the land question, and the Act of Explanation was passed through the Irish parliament by Ormond, on 23 December 1665.

His heart was in his government, and he vehemently opposed the Importation Act 1667 prohibiting the importation of Irish cattle, which struck so fatal a blow at Irish trade; and retaliated by prohibiting the import into Ireland of Scottish commodities, and obtained leave to trade with foreign countries. He encouraged Irish manufacture and learning, and it was due to his efforts that the Irish College of Physicians owes its incorporation.

He had great influence over the appointment of judges: while he naturally wished to appoint to the Bench men of legal ability, a record of loyalty to the Crown was also generally required. It is interesting that he was prepared to appoint judges of Gaelic descent, like James Donnellan, and even some who were known to have Roman Catholic leanings. He was criticised for favouring old friends like John Bysse who were considered too infirm to be effective, but this also shows one of his main virtues, loyalty: as Elrington Ball remarks, those whom Ormond had ever loved, he loved to the end. Himself a merciful man, he encouraged the Irish judges to show a similar spirit of clemency; as he remarked, a man who has been reprieved can later be hanged, but a man who has been hanged can never be reprieved. In general, the judges followed his example and, by the standards of the age, were merciful enough.

Ormond's personality had always been a striking one, and he was highly regarded. He was dignified and proud of his loyalty, even when he lost royal favour, declaring, "However ill I may stand at court I am resolved to lye well in the chronicle". Ormond soon became the mark for attack from all that was worst in the court. Buckingham especially did his utmost to undermine his influence. Ormond's almost irresponsible government of Ireland during troubled times was open to criticism.

He had billeted soldiers on civilians, and had executed martial law. He was threatened by Buckingham with impeachment. In March 1669, Ormond was removed from the government of Ireland and from the committee for Irish affairs. He made no complaint, insisted that his sons and others over whom he had influence should retain their posts, and continued to fulfil the duties of his other offices, while his character and services were recognised in his election as Chancellor of the University of Oxford on 4 August 1669.

In 1670, an extraordinary attempt was made to assassinate the duke by a ruffian and adventurer named Thomas Blood, already notorious for an unsuccessful plot to surprise Dublin Castle in 1663, and later for stealing the royal crown from the Tower. Ormond was attacked by Blood and his accomplices while driving up St James's Street on the night of 6 December 1670, dragged out of his coach, and taken on horseback along Piccadilly with the intention of hanging him at Tyburn. Ormond, however, succeeded in overcoming the horseman to whom he was bound, and escaped.

The outrage, it was suspected, had been instigated by Buckingham, who was openly accused of the crime by Lord Ossory, Ormond's son, in the king's presence, and threatened by him with instant death if any violence should happen to his father. These suspicions were encouraged by the improper action of the king in pardoning Blood, and in admitting him to his presence and treating him with favour after his apprehension while endeavouring to steal the crown jewels.

In his estates in Carrick-on-Suir in County Tipperary, Ormond was responsible for establishing the woollen industry in the town in 1670.

In 1671 Ormond successfully opposed Richard Talbot's attempt to upset the Act of Settlement 1662. In 1673, he again visited Ireland, returned to London in 1675 to give advice to Charles on affairs in parliament, and in 1677 was again restored to favour and reappointed to the lord lieutenancy. On his arrival in Ireland, he occupied himself in placing the revenue and the army upon a proper footing. Upon the outbreak of the disturbances caused by the Popish Plot (1678) in England, Ormond at once took steps towards rendering the Roman Catholics, who were in the proportion of 15 to 1, powerless; and the mildness and moderation of his measures served as the ground of an attack upon him in England led by Shaftesbury, from which he was defended with great spirit by his own son Lord Ossory. While wary of defending Oliver Plunkett publicly, in private he denounced the obvious falsity of the charges against him – of the informers who claimed that Plunkett had hired them to kill the King he wrote that "no schoolboy would have trusted them with the design of robbing an orchard".

In 1682 Charles summoned Ormond to court. The same year he wrote "A Letter, from a Person of Honour in the Country, in answer to the earl of Anglesey, his Observations upon the earl of Castlehaven's Memoires concerning the Rebellion of Ireland", and gave Charles general support. On 29 November 1682, an English dukedom was conferred upon him, and in June 1684 he returned to Ireland, but he was recalled in October in consequence of fresh intrigues. Before he could give up his government to Rochester, Charles II died; and Ormond's last act as lord lieutenant was to proclaim James II in Dublin.

Ormond also served as the sixth Chancellor of the University of Dublin between 1645 and 1688, although he was in exile for the first fifteen years of his tenure, and was admitted to the Middle Temple on 9 February 1683, alongside his grandson, James Butler, 2nd Duke of Ormond, and several other peers.

Subsequently, Ormond lived in retirement at Cornbury in Oxfordshire, a house lent to him by Lord Clarendon, but emerged in 1687 to offer opposition at the board of the Charterhouse to James's attempt to assume the dispensing power and force upon the institution a Roman Catholic candidate without taking the oaths. Ormond also refused the king his support in the question of the Indulgence; James, to his credit, refused to take away his offices, and continued to hold him in respect and favour to the last. Despite his long service to Ireland he admitted that he had no wish to spend his last years there.

== Death, succession, and timeline ==
Ormond died on 21 July 1688 at Kingston Lacy estate, Dorset, "not having, as he rejoyced to know, outlived his intellectuals", i.e. not having become senile. Ormond was buried in Westminster Abbey on 4 August 1688. His eldest son, Thomas, 6th Earl of Ossory, predeceased him, but Ossory's eldest son James succeeded as 2nd Duke of Ormond (1665–1745).

The anonymous author of Ormond's biography in the Encyclopædia Britannica (11th ed.) wrote that with him disappeared the greatest and grandest figure of the times, and that Ormond's splendid qualities were expressed with some felicity in verses written on welcoming his return to Ireland and printed in 1682:

A Man of Plato's grand nobility,
An inbred greatness, innate honesty;
A Man not form'd of accidents, and whom
Misfortune might oppress, not overcome
Who weighs himself not by opinion
But conscience of a noble action.

Timeline
Age	Date	Event
0	1610, 19 Oct	Born at Clerkenwell, London
9	1619, 15 Dec	Father drowned at sea. James became heir apparent as Viscount Thurles.
12	1623, 26 May	Made a ward of the Earl of Desmond, by order of the King
14	1625, 27 Mar	Accession of King Charles I, succeeding King James I
19	1629, 25 Dec	Married Elizabeth Preston
22	1633, 24 Feb	Succeeded his grandfather as the 12th Earl of Ormond.
31	1642, 15 Apr	Defeated the Confederates under Mountgarrett at the skirmish of Kilrush.
31	1642, 30 Aug	Created Marquess of Ormond.
32	1643, 15 Sep	Signed the Cessation (truce) he had negotiated with the Confederates.
33	1643, Nov	Appointed Lord Lieutenant of Ireland
35	1645, 21 Oct	Giovanni Battista Rinuccini, the papal nuncio, landed in Ireland.
35	1646, 28 Mar	Signed 1st Ormond Peace with the confederates, but it was never ratified.
36	1647, 28 Jul	Left for England.
37	1648, Feb	Escaped from London to France.
37	1648, 29 Sep	Returned to Ireland landing at Cork
38	1649, 17 Jan	Signed the 2nd Ormond Peace with the Confederates
38	1649, 30 Jan	King Charles I beheaded.
38	1649, 23 Feb	The papal nuncio Giovanni Battista Rinuccini left Ireland.
38	1649, Aug	Lost the Battle of Rathmines against the Parliamentarians under Michael Jones
38	1649, Sep	Made a Knight of the Garter
40	1650, 11 Dec	Left Ireland, sailing on the frigate Elizabeth from Gleninagh Castle in the Bay of Galway
49	1660, 29 May	Restoration of King Charles II
50	1661, 30 Mar	Created Duke of Ormond in the Irish Peerage
51	1661, 4 Nov	Appointed Lord Lieutenant of Ireland
69	1680, 30 Jul	Son Thomas, Earl of Ossory, died.
74	1685, 6 Feb	Accession of King James II, succeeding King Charles II
77	1688, 21 Jul	Died at Kingston Lacy estate, Dorset, England

== Immediate ancestry ==
Ancestors of James Butler, 1st Duke of Ormond

8. The Hon. John Butler
4. Walter Butler, 11th Earl of Ormond
9. Katherine MacCarthy
2. Thomas Butler, Viscount Thurles
10. Edmund Butler, 2nd Viscount Mountgarret
5. The Hon. Helen Butler
11. The Hon. Grizel Fitzpatrick
1. James Butler, 1st Duke of Ormond
12. Nicholas Poyntz
6. John Poyntz
13. Anne Verney
3. Elizabeth Poyntz
14. Alexander Sydenham
7. Elizabeth Sydenham
15. Anne Sydenham

== Notes and references ==
=== Sources ===
- Airy, Osmund (1886). "Butler, James, twelfth Earl and first Duke of Ormonde (1610–1688)". In Lee, Sidney (ed.). Dictionary of National Biography. Vol. VIII. New York: MacMillan and Co. pp. 52–60. OCLC 8544105.
- Aubrey, Philip (1990). Mr Secretary Thurloe. London: Athlone Press. ISBN 0-485-11347-3. – (Snippet view)
- Bagwell, Richard (1909). Ireland under the Stuarts and under the Interregnum. Vol. II. London: Longmans, Green, and Co. OCLC 458582656. – 1642 to 1660
- Ball, Francis Elrington (1926). The Judges in Ireland 1221–1921. Vol. I (1st ed.). London: John Murray. OCLC 832154869. – 1221 to 1690
- Barnard, Toby (2004). "Butler, James, first duke of Ormond (1610–1688)". In Matthew, Henry Colin Gray.; Harrison, Brian (eds.). Oxford Dictionary of National Biography. Vol. 9. New York: Oxford University Press. pp. 153–163. ISBN 0-19-861359-8.
- Burke, Bernard (1866). A Genealogical History of the Dormant, Abeyant, Forfeited and Extinct Peerages of the British Empire (New ed.). London: Harrison. OCLC 11501348. (for Wentworth)
- Burke, Bernard; Burke, Ashworth Peter (1915). A Genealogical and Heraldic History of the Peerage and Baronetage, the Privy Council, Knightage and Companionage (77th ed.). London: Harrison. OCLC 1155471554.
- Carte, Thomas (1851) [1st pub. 1736]. The Life of James Duke of Ormond. Vol. I (New ed.). Oxford: Oxford University Press. OCLC 1086656347. – 1613 to 1641
- Chester, Joseph Lemuel (1876). Registers of Westminster Abbey. London: Private Edition. OCLC 1140248. – Marriages, baptisms and burials from about 1660 to 1875
- Chisholm, Hugh, ed. (1911). "Ormonde, James Butler, 1st Duke of" . Encyclopædia Britannica. Vol. 20 (11th ed.). Cambridge University Press. pp. 296–297.
- Coffey, Diarmid (1914). O'Neill and Ormond – A Chapter of Irish History. Dublin: Maunsel & Company. OCLC 906164979.
- Cokayne, George Edward (1895). Complete Peerage of England, Scotland, Ireland, Great Britain and the United Kingdom, Extant, Extinct, or Dormant. Vol. VI (1st ed.). London: George Bell and Sons. OCLC 1180818801. – N to R (for Ormond)
- Cusack, Mary Frances (1871). A Compendium of Irish History. Boston: Patrick Donahoe. OCLC 873009963.
- Debrett, John (1828a). Peerage of the United Kingdom of Great Britain and Ireland. Vol. I (17th ed.). London: F. C. and J. Rivington. OCLC 54499602. – England
- Debrett, John (1828b). Peerage of the United Kingdom of Great Britain and Ireland. Vol. II (17th ed.). London: F. C. and J. Rivington. OCLC 54499602. – Scotland and Ireland
- Dunboyne, Patrick Theobald Tower Butler, Baron (1968). Butler Family History (2nd ed.). Kilkenny: Rothe House.
- Firth, Charles Harding; Rait, R. S. (1911). The Acts and Ordinances of the Interregnum. Laws, etc. Vol. II. London: His/Her Majesty's Stationery Office. OCLC 271021959.
- Fryde, Edmund Boleslaw; Greenway, D. E.; Porter, S.; Roy, I., eds. (1986). Handbook of British Chronology. Royal Historical Society Guides and Handbooks, No. 2 (3rd ed.). London: Offices of the Royal Historical Society. ISBN 0-86193-106-8. – (for timeline)
- Hamilton, Anthony (1888). Memoirs of Count Grammont. Translated by Walpole, Horace. Philadelphia: Gebbie & Co. OCLC 1048777116.
- Hardiman, James (1820). History of the town and county of the town of Galway. Dublin: W. Folds & Sons. OCLC 875131724.
- Kearney, Hugh Francis (1965). "Ireland–History–Charles I". In Benton, William (ed.). Encyclopædia Britannica. Vol. 12 (15th ed.). Chicago: Encyclopædia Britannica Inc. pp. 557–558. OCLC 1033591649.
- Kenyon, John Philipps (1970) [1st pub. 1966]. The Stuarts (New ed.). London: Fontana. ISBN 9780006329527. OCLC 1036869886.
- Kenyon, John Philipps (1972). The Popish Plot. New York. OCLC 1036783743.
- Lodge, John (1789). Archdall, Mervyn (ed.). The Peerage of Ireland or, A Genealogical History of the Present Nobility of that Kingdom. Vol. IV. Dublin: James Moore. OCLC 264906028. – Viscounts (for Butler, Viscount Mountgarrett)
- Lodge, Richard (1910). The Political History of England. Vol. VIII From the Restoration to the Death of William III 1660–1702. London: Longman Green & Co. OCLC 1012365625. – 1660 to 1702
- O'Sullivan, Mary Donovan (1983) [1st pub. 1942]. Old Galloway: the history of a Norman colony in Ireland. Galway: Kennys Bookshops and Art Galleries. ISBN 978-0-906312-21-6.
- Pepys, Samuel (1893). Wheatley, Henry Benjamin (ed.). The Diary of Samuel Pepys. Vol. II. London: George Bell and Sons. OCLC 503692830. – 1 April 1661 to 31 December 1662
- Perceval-Maxwell, Michael (2004). "Butler [née Preston] Elizabeth, duchess of Ormond and suo jure Lady Dingwall (1615–1684)". In Matthew, Henry Colin Gray.; Harrison, Brian (eds.). Oxford Dictionary of National Biography. Vol. 9. New York: Oxford University Press. pp. 130–131. ISBN 0-19-861359-8.
- Warner, Ferdinand (1768). History of the Rebellion and Civil-War in Ireland. Vol. I. Dublin: James William. OCLC 82770539. – 1641 to 1643
- Wedgwood, Cicely Veronica (1961). Thomas Wentworth, First Earl of Strafford 1593–1641. A Revaluation. London: Jonathan Cape. OCLC 1068569885.

Political offices
Preceded by The Earl of Leicester	Lord Lieutenant of Ireland	Succeeded by Lord Lisle
Preceded by Lord Lisle	Lord Lieutenant of Ireland	Succeeded by Oliver Cromwell
Vacant Title last held by The Duke of Richmond	Lord Steward; 1660–1688	Succeeded by The Earl of Devonshire
Preceded by The Duke of Albemarle	Lord Lieutenant of Ireland	Succeeded by Earl of Ossory
Preceded by The Earl of Essex	Lord Lieutenant of Ireland	Succeeded by Lords Justices
Honorary titles
Preceded by The Duke of Somerset	Lord Lieutenant of Somerset; 1660–1672	Succeeded by The Duke of Somerset
Academic offices
Preceded by Gilbert Sheldon	Chancellor of the University of Oxford; 1669–1688	Succeeded by The 2nd Duke of Ormonde
Preceded by William Laud, Archbishop of Canterbury	Chancellor of the University of Dublin; 1645–1653	Succeeded by Henry Cromwell
Peerage of England
New creation	Duke of Ormonde; 1682–1688	Succeeded by James Butler
New creation	Earl of Brecknock; 1660–1688	Succeeded by James Butler
Peerage of Ireland
New creation	Duke of Ormonde; 1661–1688	Succeeded by James Butler
New creation	Marquess of Ormonde; 1642–1688	Succeeded by James Butler
Preceded by Walter Butler	Earl of Ormonde; 1634–1688	Succeeded by James Butler
Preceded by Walter Butler	Earl of Ossory (descended by acceleration); 1634–1662	Succeeded by Thomas Butler
