= Baron Butler =

Abeyant barony in the Peerage of England

The title Baron Butler was created in the Peerage of England in 1666. The Butler family have several branches (Irish: Buitléar) who descended from Irish-Norman dynasties, all of which descended from Theobald Walter who was Chief Butler of England.

== History of the title ==
Baron Butler of Moore Park, Co. Hertford, was created in the Peerage of England in 1666, for Thomas Butler, 6th Earl of Ossory (the eldest son of the 1st Duke of Ormonde). Four years previously, he had been called up to the Irish House of Lords by a writ of acceleration as the Earl of Ossory. As the Baron predeceased his father, his son James inherited the barony in 1680 and then the dukedom in 1688. However, in 1715 his English titles were attainted because of his part in the Jacobite rising. The title was able to pass through the female line and in 1871, the attainder was reversed for the great-great-great-great-grand-nephew of the second duke, the 7th Earl Cowper. Lord Cowper died childless, however, and the title has been abeyant since 1905.

=== Barons of the second creation ===
- Thomas Butler, 6th Earl of Ossory, 1st Baron Butler (1634–1680).
- James Butler, 2nd Duke of Ormonde, 2nd Baron Butler (1665–1745), attainted 1715.
- Francis Thomas de Grey Cowper, 7th Earl Cowper, 3rd Baron Butler (1834–1905), attainder reversed in 1871, abeyant 1905.

=== Co-heirs ===
The co-heirs to the barony are the descendants of the sisters of the third baron:

- Ralph Matthew Palmer, 12th Baron Lucas of Crudwell (born 1951) (1/6)
- Hon. Sarah Nan Loch (born 1949) (1/6)
- Julian John William Salmond, Esq. (born 1926) (1/6)
- (Henry) Nicolas Gage, 8th Viscount Gage (born 1934) (1/6)
- Lady Clare Therese Hurd (nee Kerr) (born 1979) (1/6)
- Lady Mary Kerr (born 1981) (1/6)

== Sources ==
- Hesilrige, Arthur G. M. (1921). Debrett's Peerage and Titles of courtesy. London: London: Dean & son, limited. p. 179.
- Lewis, Samuel (1840). A topographical dictionary of Ireland ... With an appendix describing the electoral boundaries of the several boroughs. Vol. 2. 87 Aldersgate street, London, UK: Samuel Lewis. pp. 162, 268, 276–277. Archived from the original on 1 August 2016. Alt URL
- Griffith, Sir Richard (1825). Griffith's Primary Valuation, Tithe Applotment Books. Archived from the original on 9 November 2021.

== See also ==
- Butler dynasty
