= Earl of Grantham =

Extinct title in English peerage

Earl of Grantham is a title in the Peerage of England created on 24 December 1698, along with the titles Viscount Boston, of Boston in the County of Lincoln, and Baron Alford, of Alford in the County of Lincoln, for Henry de Nassau d'Auverquerque, a British Army officer and cousin of King William III of England. The titles were created with a special remainder, failing heirs male of his body, to his three brothers Cornelius, Maurice, and Francis, in like manner respectively. Since both his sons and his three brothers had predeceased him, the titles became extinct upon his death in 1754.

== Earls of Grantham (1698) ==
(for genealogy)

Arms of the Earls of Grantham

- Henry de Nassau d'Auverquerque, 1st Earl of Grantham (1675–1754)
  - Henry, Viscount Boston (1697–1718)
  - Thomas, Viscount Boston (1700–1730)

== In fiction ==
Screenwriter Julian Fellowes used the title, Earl of Grantham — although as a fictional one and according to the storyline created in 1772 in the Peerage of Great Britain — for one of the main characters, Robert Crawley, in his 2010–2015 ITV1 period drama Downton Abbey. In this fictional setting, Viscount Downton was one of Crawley's subsidiary titles.

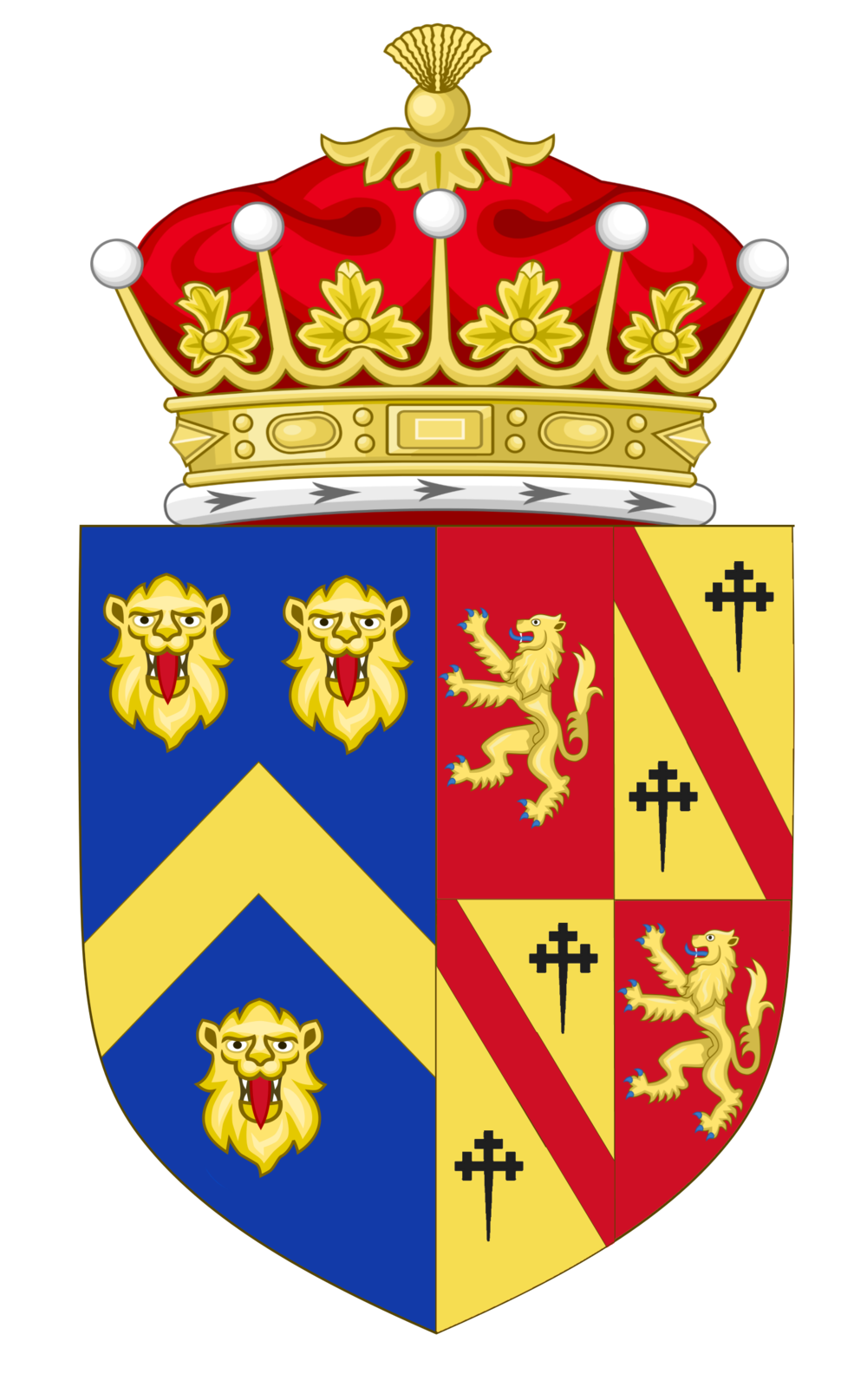
Arms of the fictional Earls of Grantham in the TV-series Downton Abbey.

Victor Hugo's 1869 novel The Man Who Laughs includes a reference to the Earl of Grantham and the Earl's Manor.

== See also ==
- Baron Grantham, created in the Peerage of Great Britain in 1761, merged with the title Earl de Grey from 1833 and extinct in 1923.
