= J. D. Davies =

British naval historian (born 1957)

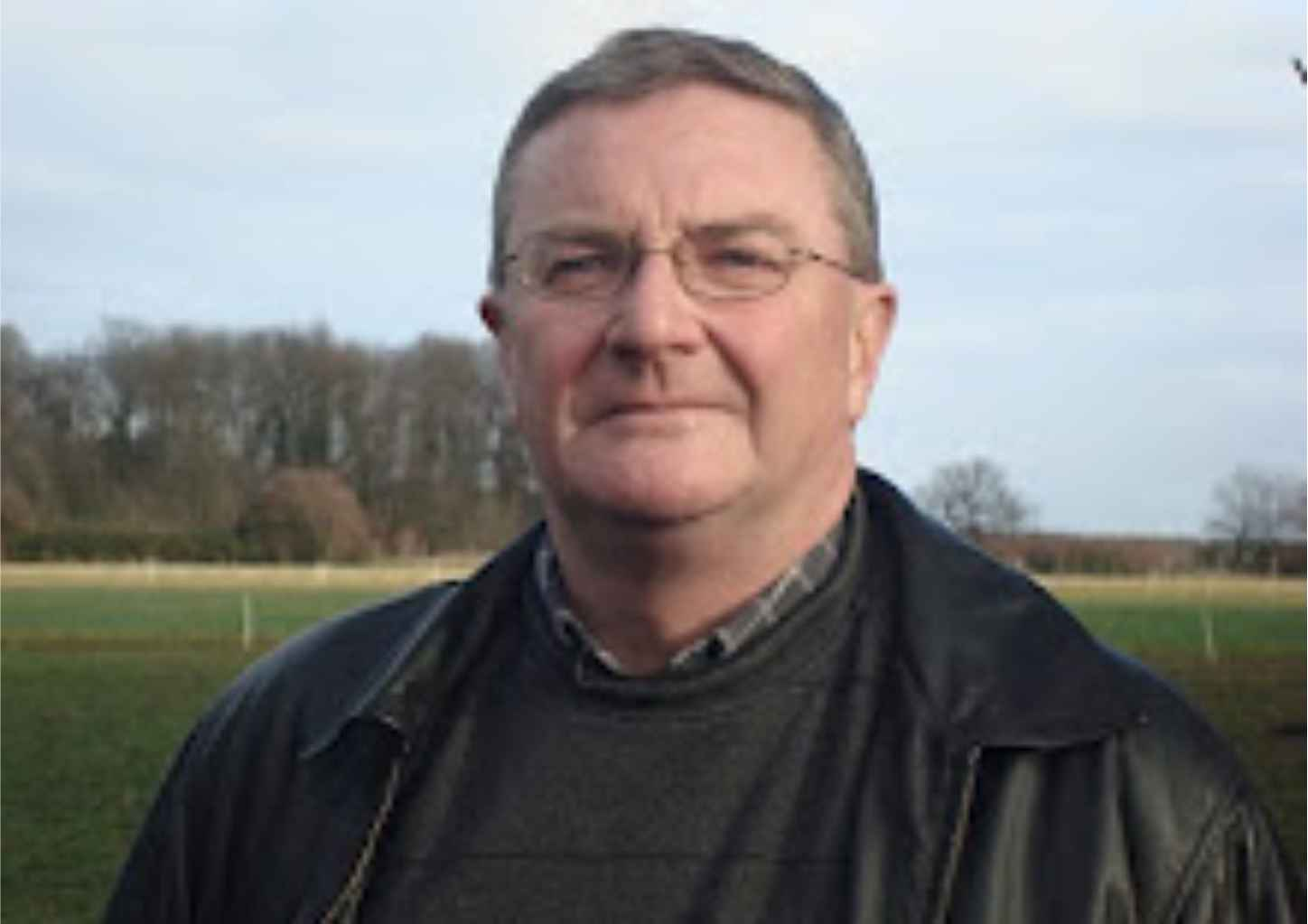
- Born: J. D. (David) Davies; 1 April 1957 (age 69); Llanelli, Carmarthenshire
- Occupation: British historian (naval history)
- Known for: Author
- Website: jddavies.com

J. D. (David) Davies (born 1 April 1957) is a British historian, specialising primarily in naval history, and the author of both fiction and non-fiction books.

== Life and career ==
Davies was educated at Llanelli Boys' Grammar School and Jesus College, Oxford. After teaching for some years in Newquay, Cornwall, he returned to Oxford to undertake doctoral research on the naval history of the Restoration period. He was awarded the degree of DPhil in 1986. He subsequently taught history and politics at Bedford Modern School, also serving as a Sub-Lieutenant RNR (CCF). Ultimately, he served as Deputy Head (Academic) at BMS from 2000 to 2004. He then gave up full-time teaching to develop his writing career.

== Published works ==
Davies's first book, Gentlemen and Tarpaulins: The Officers and Men of the Restoration Navy (1991) was a revised version of his doctoral thesis. The American Historical Review stated the second half of the book was a "pioneering study" that was "expertly presented". His second book, Pepys's Navy: Ships, Men and Warfare 1649–89, was published in 2008, followed in 2010 by his first non-naval book, Blood of Kings: the Stuarts, the Ruthvens and the 'Gowrie Conspiracy'. Britannia's Dragon: A Naval History of Wales followed in 2013. His non-fiction book Kings of the Sea: Charles II, James II and the Royal Navy was published in 2017.{

Davies has contributed many articles and essays to historical journals and other works, including 67 entries in the Oxford Dictionary of National Biography and a chapter in the Oxford History of the Royal Navy. He is working on a history of the Stepney family, baronets of Llanelli.

=== Matthew Quinton novels ===
This series of novels centres on the adventures of Captain Matthew Quinton, one of the young "gentlemen captains" promoted by King Charles II of England despite their almost complete lack of experience of the sea. The first book, Gentleman Captain, published in North America in 2009, was described by Booklist as "a splendid book, with terrific characters, a thrilling adventure, and a wonderful sense of time and place" and by Kirkus Reviews as "a delightful tale". The subsequent books in the series include The Mountain of Gold, The Blast that Tears the Skies, The Lion of Midnight, The Battle Of All The Ages, Death's Bright Angel, The Rage of Fortune and The Devil Upon the Wave.

Ensign Royal (2014) also features Matthew Quinton but is a novella.

=== Jack Stannard novels ===
Set in the Tudor period, the Stannard trilogy follows the fortunes of a seafaring family from Dunwich, Suffolk, during the forty year period from the sinking of the Mary Rose to the fight against the Spanish Armada. The stories are also set against the backdrops of the switchback religious changes in Tudor England and Dunwich’s relentless battle against the encroaching sea. The trilogy consists of Destiny's Tide, Battle's Flood and Armada's Wake.

== Awards and positions of responsibility ==
Davies won the Julian Corbett essay prize for naval history in 1986, and in 2009 Pepys’s Navy was awarded the Samuel Pepys award and Latham medal. Kings of the Sea won the Anderson prize for 2017, and also received a certificate of merit for the Mountbatten prize. Davies served as chairman of the Naval Dockyards Society from 2005 to 2013 and as vice-president of the Navy Records Society from 2008 to 2012, having previously served several terms on the society's council. He was elected Chairman of the Society for Nautical Research in 2020. Davies was elected a Fellow of the Royal Historical Society in 2010 .

== Bibliography ==
=== The Matthew Quinton series ===
- Gentleman Captain (2009)
- The Mountain of Gold (2010)
- The Blast that Tears the Skies (2011)
- The Lion of Midnight (2013)
- The Battle of All the Ages (2014)
- The Rage of Fortune (2016 a 'prequel' to the series featuring Matthew Quinton's grandfather)
- Death's Bright Angel (2016)
- The Devil Upon the Wave (2017)
- Novella: Ensign Royal (2014)

=== The Jack Stannard Series ===
- Destiny's Tide (2018)
- Battle’s Flood (2019)
- Armada’s Wake (2020)

=== Non-fiction ===
- Gentlemen and Tarpaulins: The Officers and Men of the Restoration Navy (1991)
- Pepys's Navy – Ships, Men and Warfare (2008)
- Blood of Kings: The Stuarts, the Ruthvens, and the 'Gowrie Conspiracy' (2010)
- Britannia's Dragon: A Naval History of Wales (2013)
- Kings of the Sea: Charles II, James II and the Royal Navy (2017)
- Ideologies of Western Naval Power c 1500-1815 (2019; co-editor with A James and G Rommelse)
