= Lord Dingwall =

Title in the Peerage of Scotland

Lord Dingwall is a title in the Peerage of Scotland. It was created in 1584 for Andrew Keith, and in 1609 for Sir Richard Preston, with remainder to his heirs whatsoever. In 1619 he was further honoured when he was made Baron Dunmore and Earl of Desmond in the Peerage of Ireland, with remainder to heirs male. On his death in 1628 the Irish titles became extinct while he was succeeded in the Scottish lordship by his daughter Elizabeth, the second Lady Dingwall. She was the wife of James Butler, 1st Duke of Ormonde. Their eldest son Thomas Butler, Earl of Ossory, was summoned by writ to the English Parliament as Baron Butler, of Moore Park, in 1666. However, he predeceased his parents who were both succeeded by their grandson, the second Duke and third Lord Dingwall. He had already succeeded his father as second Baron Butler. However, the Duke was attainted in 1715 and his titles forfeited. In 1871, Francis Cowper, 7th Earl Cowper, managed to obtain a reversal of the attainder of the lordship of Dingwall and barony of Butler and became the fourth Lord Dingwall and third Baron Butler. He was the great-great-great-grandson of Henrietta d'Auverquerque, Countess of Grantham (wife of Henry de Nassau d'Auverquerque, 1st Earl of Grantham), second daughter of Thomas Butler, Earl of Ossory and 1st Baron Butler, whose second daughter Lady Henrietta de Nassau d'Auverquerque married William Clavering-Cowper, 2nd Earl Cowper. In 1880 he also succeeded his mother as eighth Baron Lucas of Crudwell. For later history of the lordship of Dingwall and barony of Butler, see the Baron Lucas of Crudwell.

== Lord Dingwall (1584) ==
- Andrew Keith, Lord Dingwall

== Lords Dingwall (1609) ==
- Richard Preston, 1st Earl of Desmond, 1st Lord Dingwall (d. 1628)
- Elizabeth Preston, Duchess of Ormonde, 2nd Lady Dingwall (1615–1684)
- James Butler, 2nd Duke of Ormonde, 3rd Lord Dingwall (1665–1745) (attainted 1715)
- Heirs but for the attainder:
  - Lady Elizabeth Butler (d. 1750)
  - Charles Butler, 1st Earl of Arran (1671–1758)
  - Lady Frances Elliot (d. 1772)
  - George Nassau Clavering-Cowper, 3rd Earl Cowper (1738–1789)
  - George Augustus Clavering-Cowper, 4th Earl Cowper (1776–1799)
  - Peter Leopold Louis Francis Nassau Clavering-Cowper, 5th Earl Cowper (1778–1837)
  - George Augustus Frederick Cowper, 6th Earl Cowper (1806–1856)
- Francis Thomas de Grey Cowper, 7th Earl Cowper, 4th Lord Dingwall (1834–1905) (restored 1871)

For further holders see Baron Lucas of Crudwell

== Family trees ==
Butler dynasty family tree including the Earls of Carrick and Irish Earls of Ormond

Theobald Walter; 1165–1206; 1st Chief Butler of Ireland
Theobald le Botiller; 1201–1230; 2nd Chief Butler of Ireland
Theobald Butler; 1224–1248; 3rd Chief Butler of Ireland
King Edward I 1239–1307	Theobald Butler; 1242–1285; 4th Chief Butler of Ireland
Earl of Carrick (1st creation), 1315	Baron Dunboyne (by prescription), 1324
Elizabeth of Rhuddlan; 1282–1316	Theobald Butler; 1269–1299; 5th Chief Butler of Ireland	Edmund Butler; 1268–1321; Earl of Carrick	Thomas Butler; 1271–1329; 1st Baron Dunboyne
Earldom of Carrick (1st creation) extinct, 1321
Earl of Ormond (1st creation), 1328)
Eleanor de Bohun; 1304–1363	James Butler; 1304–1338; 1st Earl of Ormonde	John Butler of Clonamicklon; 1305–1330	Piers Butler; 1294–1370; 2nd Baron Dunboyne
James Butler; 1331–1382; 2nd Earl of Ormonde	Edmund of Lismalin; 1325-1372	Thomas Butler; 1345–1370; 3rd Baron Dunboyne	William Butler; 1355–1406; 4th Baron Dunboyne
James Butler c. 1359–1405; 3rd Earl of Ormonde	James Butler of Lismalin; 1361–1405	William Butler d. 1415; 5th Baron Dunboyne	William Butler d. 1419; 6th Baron Dunboyne	William Butler d. 1445; 7th Baron Dunboyne
James Butler; 1393–1452; 4th Earl of Ormonde	Richard Butler of Polestown; 1395–1443	James "Gallda" Butler	James Butler; 1400–1434	Edmond Butler d. 1498; 8th Baron Dunboyne
James Butler; 1420–1461; 5th Earl of Ormonde	John Butler d. 1476; 6th Earl of Ormonde	John Butler; 1426–1515; 7th Earl of Ormonde	Edmund MacRichard Butler of Polestown; 1420–1464	Pierce Butler; 1425–1526	James Butler d. 1508; 9th Baron Dunboyne
Margaret Butler c. 1454 – 1539	James Butler of Polestown d. 1487	Walter Butler of Polestown fl. 1483	James Butler; 1473–1538	James Butler d. 1538; 10th Baron Dunboyne
Earl of Ormond (2nd creation), 1529	Earl of Ossory, 1528	Baron Dunboyne (by patent), 1541
Thomas Boleyn c. 1477–1539; Earl of Ormond, Earl of Wiltshire	Piers Butler c. 1467–1539; 8th Earl of Ormond, 1st Earl of Ossory	Theobald Butler of Polestown	Piers Butler; 1521–1578	Edmond Butler d. 1566; 1st/11th Baron Dunboyne
Earldom of Ormonde (2nd creation) extinct, 1539	Earldom of Ormonde (1st creation) resigned, 1528 and restored, 1538
Viscount Thurles, 1536	Viscount Mountgarret, 1550
King Henry VIII; 1491–1547	Anne Boleyn c. 1501 or c. 1507 – 1536	James Butler; 1496–1546; 9th Earl of Ormond, 2nd Earl of Ossory, 1st Viscount Thurles	Richard Butler; 1500–1571; 1st Viscount Mountgarret	Eleanor Butler	Edmond Butler of Polestown	James Butler d. 1601	James Butler d. 1624; 2nd/12th Baron Dunboyne
Thomas Butler; 1531–1614; 10th Earl of Ormond, 3rd Earl of Ossory, 2nd Viscount Thurles	Edmund Butler of Cloughgrenan; 1534 – c. 1585	John Butler of Kilcash d. 1570	Edmund Butler c. 1562 – 1602; 2nd Viscount Mountgarret	John Butler d. 1602	Piers Butler d. 1626	Edward Butler
Viscount Butler of Tulleophelim, 1603
Piers FitzThomas Butler b. 1554	Theobald Butler d. 1613; Viscount Butler of Tulleophelim	Walter Butler; 1559–1633; 11th Earl of Ormond, 4th Earl of Ossory, 3rd Viscount Thurles	Helen Butler d. 1631	Richard Butler; 1578–1651; 3rd Viscount Mountgarret	Peter Butler of Roscrea	Richard Butler of Polestown d. 1619	Edmund Butler d. 1641
Viscountcy Butler of Tulleophelim extinct, 1613
Viscount Galmoye, 1646	Lord Dingwall, 1609	Viscount Ikerrin, 1629
Edward Butler d. 1653; 1st Viscount Galmoye	Elizabeth Butler c. 1585 – 1628	Richard Preston d. 1628; Earl of Desmond, 1st Lord Dingwall	Thomas Butler a. 1596 – 1619 styled Viscount Thurles	Edmund Butler; 1595–1679; 4th Viscount Mountgarret	Walter Butler of Roscrea; 1600–1634	Edmond Butler of Polestown; 1595–1636	Pierce Butler; 1587–1661; 1st Viscount Ikerrin	Edmond Butler; 1595–1640; 3rd/13th Baron Dunboyne
Marquess of Ormonde (1st creation), 1642; Duke of Ormonde (Ireland), 1661; Duke of Ormonde (England), 1682	Baronet of Polestown, 1645
Piers Butler of Duiske d. 1650	Elizabeth Preston; 1615–1684; 2nd Baroness Dingwall, suo jure	James FitzThomas Butler; 1610–1688; 1st Duke of Ormond, etc., 12th Earl of Ormond, 5th Earl of Ossory, 4th Viscount Thurles	Richard Butler of Kilcash; 1615–1701	Walter Butler d. 1650; 1st Baronet of Polestown	James Butler c. 1616 – 1638	James Butler d. 1662; 4th/14th Baron Dunboyne	Pierce Butler d. 1690; 5th/15th Baron Dunboyne	James Butler
Earl of Arran (1st Irish creation), Viscount Tullogh (1st creation), Baron Butler of Cloughgrennan (1st creation), 1662
Baron Butler of Moore Park, 1666	Baron Butler of Weston (1st creation), 1673	Earl of Gowran, 1676
Edward Butler c. 1627 – after 1667; 2nd Viscount Galmoye	Thomas Butler; 1634–1680; 13th Earl of Ormond, 6th Earl of Ossory, 5th Viscount Thurles, 1st Baron Butler	Richard Butler; 1639–1686; Earl of Arran, etc.	John Butler; 1643–1677; 1st Earl of Gowran	Richard Butler a. 1661 – 1707; 5th Viscount Mountgarret	Richard Butler d. c. 1679; 2nd Baronet of Polestown	Pierce Butler; 1637–1680; 2nd Viscount Ikerrin	James Butler d. 1701; 6th/16th Baron Dunboyne
Earldom of Arran (1st Irish creation) and subsidiary titles extinct, 1686	Earldom of Gowran extinct, 1677
Earl of Arran (2nd Irish creation), Viscount Tullogh (2nd creation), Baron Butler of Cloughgrennan (2nd creation), 1693; Baron Butler of Weston (2nd creation), 1694; Duke of Arran (Jacobite), 1722
Piers Butler; 1652–1740; Earl of Newcastle, 3rd Viscount Galmoye	James FitzThomas Butler; 1665–1745; 2nd Duke of Ormond, etc., 14th Earl of Ormond, 7th Earl of Ossory, 6th Viscount Thurles, 3rd Lord Dingwall, 2nd Baron Butler	Charles Butler; 1671–1758; 3rd Duke of Ormond, de jure, Earl of Arran, etc.	Walter Butler of Garryricken d. 1700	Edmund Butler; 1663–1735; 6th Viscount Mountgarret	James Butler d. 1688; 3rd Viscount Ikerrin	Edward Butler
Viscountcy Galmoye extinct, 1697	Dukedom of Ormonde (England) forfeit by attainder, 1715, but Irish dukedom continued	Dukedom of Arran (Jacobite), dukedom of Ormonde (Ireland), earldom of Arran, and subsidiary titles, and barony Butler extinct, 1758
Thomas Butler of Garryricken d. 1738	John Butler of Garryricken d. 1738	Richard Butler; 1685–1736; 7th Viscount Mountgarret	James Butler; 1686–1749; 8th Viscount Mountgarret	Edmund Butler; 1687–1751; 9th Viscount Mountgarret	Walter Butler c. 1678 – 1723; 3rd Baronet of Polestown	Pierce Butler; 1679–1711; 4th Viscount Ikerrin	Thomas Butler; 1683–1719; 6th Viscount Ikerrin	Pierce Butler d. 1718; 7th/17th Baron Dunboyne	Edmund Butler d. 1732; 8th/18th Baron Dunboyne
Earls of Carrick (2nd creation), 1748
John Butler of Kilcash and Garryricken c. 1720 – 1766; 15th Earl of Ormond, 8th Earl of Ossory de jure, 7th Viscount Thurles	Walter Butler of Kilcash and Garryricken; 1703–1783; 16th Earl of Ormond, 9th Earl of Ossory de jure, 8th Viscount Thurles	Edmund Butler d. 1779; 10th Viscount Mountgarret	Edmund Butler c. 1708 – 1762; 4th Baronet of Polestown	James Butler d. 1711; 5th Viscount Ikerrin	James Butler; 1714–1721; 7th Viscount Ikerrin	Somerset Butler; 1718–1774; 1st Earl of Carrick, 8th Viscount Ikerrin	Michael Butler d. 1776
Baronetcy Butler of Polestown extinct, 1762
Earldoms of Ormond and Ossory acknowledged, 1791
John Butler; 1740–1795; 17th Earl of Ormond, 10th Earl of Ossory, 9th Viscount Thurles	Edmund Butler; 1745–1793; 11th Viscount Mountgarret	Henry Butler; 1746–1813; 2nd Earl of Carrick, 9th Viscount Ikerrin	James Butler d. 1768; 9th/19th Baron Dunboyne	Pierce Butler d. 1773; 10th/20th Baron Dunboyne	John Butler; 1731–1800; 12th/22nd Baron Dunboyne	James Butler d. 1784
Marquess of Ormonde (2nd creation)	Baron Ormonde of Llanthony, 1821
and Baron Butler of Llanthony, 1816	Marquess of Ormonde (3rd creation), 1825	Earl of Kilkenny, 1793
Walter Butler; 1770–1820; Marquess of Ormonde, etc., 18th Earl of Ormond, 11th Earl of Ossory, 10th Viscount Thurles, Baron Butler of Llanthony	James Butler; 1777–1838; 1st Marquess of Ormonde, etc., 19th Earl of Ormond, 12th Earl of Ossory, 10th Viscount Thurles	Edmund Butler; 1771–1846; Earl of Kilkenny, 12th Viscount Mountgarret	Henry Butler; 1773–1842	Somerset Butler; 1779–1838; 3rd Earl of Carrick, 10th Viscount Ikerrin	Henry Edward Butler; 1780–1856	Pierce Butler d. 1785; 11th/21st Baron Dunboyne	James Butler; 1780–1850; 13th/23rd Baron Dunboyne
Marquessate of Ormonde (1st creation), etc. extinct, 1820	Earldom of Kilkenny extinct, 1846
John Butler; 1808–1854; 2nd Marquess of Ormonde, etc., 20th Earl of Ormond, 13th Earl of Ossory, 11th Viscount Thurles	Henry Butler; 1816–1900; 13th Viscount Mountgarret	Henry Butler; 1834–1846; 4th Earl of Carrick, 11th Viscount Ikerrin	Somerset Butler; 1835–1901; 5th Earl of Carrick, 12th Viscount Ikerrin	Charles George Butler; 1823–1854	Theobald Butler; 1806–1881; 14th/24th Baron Dunboyne
James Butler; 1844–1919; 3rd Marquess of Ormonde, etc., 21st Earl of Ormond, 14th Earl of Ossory, 12th Viscount Thurles	Arthur Butler; 1849–1943; 4th Marquess of Ormonde, etc., 22nd Earl of Ormond, 15th Earl of Ossory, 13th Viscount Thurles	James Theobald Butler; 1852–1929	Henry Butler; 1844–1912; 14th Viscount Mountgarret	Charles Butler; 1851–1909; 6th Earl of Carrick, 13th Viscount Ikerrin	James Clifford-Butler; 1839–1899; 15th/25th Baron Dunboyne	Robert Butler; 1844–1913; 16th/26th Baron Dunboyne
Baron Butler of Mount Juliet, 1912
Arthur Butler; 1890–1949; 5th Marquess of Ormonde, etc., 23rd Earl of Ormond, 16th Earl of Ossory, 14th Viscount Thurles	Arthur Butler; 1890–1949; 6th Marquess of Ormonde, etc., 24th Earl of Ormond, 17th Earl of Ossory, 15th Viscount Thurles	Charles Butler; 1899–1997; 7th Marquess of Ormonde, etc., 25th Earl of Ormond, 18th Earl of Ossory, 16th Viscount Thurles	Edmund Butler; 1875–1918; 15th Viscount Mountgarret	Charles Butler; 1873–1931; 7th Earl of Carrick, 14th Viscount Ikerrin, 1st Baron Butler of Mount Juliet	Fitzwalter Butler; 1874–1945; 17th/27th Baron Dunboyne
Marquessate of Ormonde extinct, earldoms of Ormond and Ossory, and viscountcy Thurles dormant, 1997
James Butler; 1916–1940 styled Viscount Thuries	Piers Butler; 1903–1966; 16th Viscount Mountgarret	Theobald Butler; 1903–1957; 8th Earl of Carrick, 15th Viscount Ikerrin, 2nd Baron Butler of Mount Juliet
Richard Butler; 1936–2004; 17th Viscount Mountgarret	Brian Butler; 1931–1992; 9th Earl of Carrick, 16th Viscount Ikerrin, 3rd Baron Butler of Mount Juliet	Patrick Butler; 1917–2004; 18th/28th Baron Dunboyne
Piers Butler b. 1961; 18th Viscount Mountgarret	David Butler; 1953–2008; 10th Earl of Carrick, 17th Viscount Ikerrin, 4th Baron Butler of Mount Juliet	John Butler; 1951–2013; 19th/29th Baron Dunboyne
Heir presumptive to the earldoms of Ormonde and Ossory
Arion Butler b. 1975; 11th Earl of Carrick, 18th Viscount Ikerrin, 5th Baron Butler of Mount Juliet	Piers Butler b. 1979	Richard Butler b. 1983; 20th/30th Baron Dunboyne
Heir presumptive to the Earldom of Carrick
Theo Oliver Stafford Butler b. 2015	Caspian Fitzwalter Butler b. 2020
Heir apparent to the viscountcy Mountgarret	Heir apparent to the barony Dunboyne

Fitzmaurice family tree and the FitzGerald dynasty
Note that there are differing accounts as to which FitzMaurice was the 1st Baron Kerry. The Complete Peerage starts the numbering at Maurice Fitzthomas. Irish pedigrees starts the numbering at Thomas Fitzmaurice.

Maurice FitzGerald "Maurice de Windsor" c. 1105–c. 1176; Lord of Llanstephan, Baron of Naas, Lord of Maynooth
Robert FitzMaurice; Details unknown	Thomas FitzMaurice FitzGerald c. 1145–1213; Lord OConnello	Gerald FitzMaurice c. 1150–1203; 1st Baron of Offaly
Baron Kerry and Lixnaw, 1223	See Baron of Offaly
Thomas Fitzmaurice c. 1220–1280; 1st Baron Kerry and Lixnaw; Lord OConnello	John FitzThomas d. 1261; 1st Baron Desmond
Maurice Fitzthomas d. c. 1260; 2nd Baron Kerry and Lixnaw	Maurice FitzJohn FitzGerald d. 1261
Nicholas Fitzthomas d. 1324; 3rd Baron Kerry and Lixnaw	Thomas Fitzmaurice FitzGerald d. 1298; 2nd Baron Desmond
Earl of Desmond (1st creation), 1329
Maurice Fitzthomas d. 1339; 4th Baron Kerry and Lixnaw	John Fitzthomas d. 1348; 5th Baron Kerry and Lixnaw	Aveline (Eleanor)	Maurice FitzThomas FitzGerald d. 1358; 1st Earl of Desmond, 4th Baron Desmond	Thomas FitzThomas FitzGerald; 1290–1307; 3rd Baron Desmond
Maurice FitzJohn Fitzmaurice d. 1398; 6th Baron Kerry and Lixnaw	Maurice FitzMaurice FitzGerald "Maurice Óg"; 1335–1398; 2nd Earl of Desmond, 5th Baron Desmond	Gerald FitzGerald; 1335–1398; 3rd Earl of Desmond, 6th Baron Desmond
Patrick FitzMaurice FitzJohn d. c. 1410; 7th Baron Kerry and Lixnaw	John FitzGerald d. 1399; 4th Earl of Desmond, 7th Baron Desmond	James FitzGerald d. 1462; 6th Earl of Desmond, 9th Baron Desmond
Thomas FitzMaurice d. 1469; 8th Baron Kerry and Lixnaw	Thomas FitzGerald c. 1386–1420; 5th Earl of Desmond, 8th Baron Desmond	Thomas FitzJames FitzGerald "the Great Earl" d. c. 1467/68; 7th Earl of Desmond, 10th Baron Desmond
Edmond FitzMaurice d. 1541; 9th Baron Kerry and Lixnaw	James fitz Thomas FitzGerald; 1459–1487; 8th Earl of Desmond, 11th Baron Desmond	Maurice fitz Thomas FitzGerald d. 1520; 9th (or 10th) Earl of Desmond, 12th Baron Desmond	Thomas fitz Thomas FitzGerald; 1454–1534; 11th (or 12th) Earl of Desmond, 14th Baron Desmond	John fitz Thomas FitzGerald d. 1536; 12th Earl of Desmond de facto, 15th Baron Desmond de facto
Thomas FitzMaurice; Details unknown	James fitz Maurice FitzGerald d. 1529; 10th (or 11th) Earl of Desmond, 13th Baron Desmond	Maurice fitz Thomas FitzGerald d. 1529	James fitz John FitzGerald d. 1558; 13th (or 14th) Earl of Desmond, 16th Baron Desmond
Edmond FitzMaurice d. 1543; 10th Baron Kerry and Lixnaw	Joan Fitzgerald d. 1565	James fitz Maurice FitzGerald ("Court Page") d. 1540; 12th (or 13th) Earl of Desmond de jure, 15th Baron Desmond de jure
Barony of Kerry and Lixnaw resigned, 1529
Baron Odorney and Viscount Kilmaule, 1537
Edmond FitzMaurice d. 1541; 11th Baron Kerry and Lixnaw	Patrick FitzMaurice d. 1547; 12th Baron Kerry and Lixnaw	Gerard FitzMaurice d. 1550; 15th Baron Kerry and Lixnaw	Thomas Fitzmaurice; 1502–1590; 16th Baron Kerry and Lixnaw	Margaret "the Fair"	Thomas Butler ("Black Tom") c. 1531–1614; Earl of Ormond and Earl of Ossory	Gerald FitzGerald ("Rebel Earl") c. 1533–1583; 14th (or 15th or 16th) Earl of Desmond, 17th Baron Desmond
Barony of Odorney and viscountcy of Kilmaule extinct, 1541	Earldom of Desmond (1st creation) attainted, 1582
Lord Dingwall (2nd creation), 1609; Earl of Desmond (3rd creation) and Baron Dunmore, 1619	Earl of Desmond (2nd creation for life), 1600
Thomas FitzMaurice d. 1549; 13th Baron Kerry and Lixnaw	Edmond FitzMaurice d. 1549; 14th Baron Kerry and Lixnaw	Patrick Fitzmaurice; 1551?–1600; 17th Baron Kerry and Lixnaw	Richard Preston d. 1628; Earl of Desmond and Baron Dunmore, 1st Lord Dingwall	Elizabeth (Butler) Preston c. 1585–1628	James FitzGerald ("Tower Earl"); 1571–1601; Earl of Desmond
Viscount Feilding and Baron Feilding, 1620; Earl of Denbigh, 1622	Earldom of Desmond (3rd creation) and barony of Dunmore extinct, 1628	Earldom of Desmond (2nd creation) extinct, 1601
Thomas Fitzmaurice; 1574–1630; 18th Baron Kerry	William Feilding c. 1587–1643; 1st Earl of Denbigh, etc.
Baron St. Liz, 1664	Viscount Callan and Baron Feilding of Lecagh, 1622; Earl of Desmond (4th creation) on reversion, 1628
Patrick FitzMaurice; 1595–1661; 19th Baron Kerry	Basil Feilding c. 1608–1675; 2nd Earl Denbigh, etc., 1st Baron St. Liz	George Feilding c. 1614–1665; 1st Earl of Desmond, etc.	Earldom of Desmond created in expectation of marriage, which did not happen	Elizabeth (Preston) Butler; 1615–1684; 2nd Lady Dingwall suo jure
William FitzMaurice; 1633–1697; 20th Baron Kerry	William Feilding; 1640–1685; 3rd Earl Denbigh, etc. 2nd Earl of Desmond, etc., 2nd Baron St. Liz	Thomas Butler; 1634–1680; Earl of Ossory
Earl of Kerry, 1753
Thomas FitzMaurice; 1668–1741; 1st Earl of Kerry, 21st Baron Kerry	Basil Feilding; 1668–1717; 4th Earl Denbigh, etc. 3rd Earl of Desmond, etc., 3rd Baron St. Liz	James Butler; 1665–1745; Duke of Ormonde, Earl of Ossory, 3rd Lord Dingwall
Lordship of Dingwall (2nd creation) forfeit, 1715
Viscount FitzMaurice and Baron Dunkeron, 1751; Earl of Shelburne (2nd creation), 1753; Baron Wycombe, 1760
William FitzMaurice; 1694–1747; 2nd Earl of Kerry, 22nd Baron Kerry	John Petty-Fitzmaurice; 1706–1761; 1st Earl of Shelburne, etc.	Baron Nairne	William Feilding; 1697–1775; 5th Earl Denbigh, etc. 4th Earl of Desmond, etc., 4th Baron St. Liz
Marquess of Lansdowne, Earl of Wycombe, and Viscount Calne and Calston, 1784	Baron Keith (1st creation: Ireland), 1797; Baron Keith (2nd creation: UK), 1801; Baron Keith (3rd creation: UK), 1803; Viscount Keith (UK), 1814
Francis Thomas-Fitzmaurice; 1740–1818; 3rd Earl of Kerry, 23rd Baron Kerry	William Petty-Fitzmaurice; 1737–1805; 1st Marquess of Lansdowne, etc., 2nd Earl of Shelburne, etc.	Jane Mercer	George Keith Elphinstone; 1746–1823; Viscount Keith, Baron Keith (Ire, UK, UK)	Basil Feilding; 1719–1800; 6th Earl Denbigh, etc. 5th Earl of Desmond, etc., 5th Baron St. Liz
Viscountcy of Keith and Barony of Keith (1st creation) extinct, 1801
John Henry Petty; 1765–1809; 2nd Marquess of Lansdowne, etc., 3rd Earl of Shelburne, etc.	Henry Petty-Fitzmaurice; 1780–1863; 3rd Marquess of Lansdowne, etc., 4th Earl of Shelburne, etc., 4th Earl of Kerry, 24th Baron Kerry	Margaret Mercer Elphinstone; 1788–1867; Comtesse de Flahaut, 2nd Baroness Keith (Ire, UK), 7th Lady Nairne	William Robert Feilding; 1760–1799 styled Viscount Feilding
Baronies of Keith (2nd & 3rd creations) extinct, 1867
William Thomas Petty-FitzMaurice; 1811–1836 styled Earl of Kerry	Henry Thomas Petty-Fitzmaurice; 1816–1866; 4th Marquess of Lansdowne, etc., 5th Earl of Shelburne, etc., 5th Earl of Kerry, 24th Baron Kerry	Emily Jane Petty-FitzMaurice; 1819–1895; 8th Lady Nairne	William Basil Percy Feilding; 1796–1865; 7th Earl Denbigh, etc. 6th Earl of Desmond, etc., 6th Baron St. Liz
Baron Mersey, 1910; Viscount Mersey, 1916	Baron Fitzmaurice, 1906
John Charles Bigham; 1840–1929; 1st Viscount Mersey, etc.	Henry Charles Keith Petty-Fitzmaurice; 1845–1927; 5th Marquess of Lansdowne, etc., 6th Earl of Shelburne, etc., 6th Earl of Kerry, 24th Baron Kerry, 9th Lord Nairne	Edmond Fitzmaurice; 1846–1935; Baron Fitzmaurice	Rudolph William Basil Feilding ("Rollo"); 1823–1892; 8th Earl Denbigh, etc. 7th Earl of Desmond, etc., 7th Baron St. Liz
Barony of Fitzmaurice extinct, 1935
Charles Clive Bigham; 1872–1956; 2nd Viscount Mersey, etc.	Henry William Edmund Petty-Fitzmaurice; 1872–1936; 6th Marquess of Lansdowne, etc., 7th Earl of Shelburne, etc., 7th Earl of Kerry, 25th Baron Kerry, 10th Lord Nairne	Charles Fitzmaurice; 1874–1914	Rudolph Robert Basil Aloysius Augustine Feilding; 1859–1939; 9th Earl Denbigh, etc. 8th Earl of Desmond, etc., 8th Baron St. Liz
Edward Clive Bigham; 1906–1979; 3rd Viscount Mersey, etc.	Katherine Bigham; 1912–1995; 12th Lady Nairne	Charles Hope Petty-Fitzmaurice; 1917–1944; 7th Marquess of Lansdowne, etc., 8th Earl of Shelburne, etc., 8th Earl of Kerry, 26th Baron Kerry, 11th Lord Nairne	George John Charles Mercer Nairne Petty-Fitzmaurice; 1912–1999; 8th Marquess of Lansdowne, etc., 9th Earl of Shelburne, etc., 9th Earl of Kerry, 27th Baron Kerry	William Rudolph Stephen Feilding; 1912–1966; 10th Earl Denbigh, etc. 9th Earl of Desmond, etc., 9th Baron St. Liz
Richard Maurice Clive Bigham; 1934–2006; 4th Viscount Mersey, etc., 13th Lord Nairne	David Edward Hugh Bigham b. 1938	Charles Maurice Petty-Fitzmaurice b. 1941; 9th Marquess of Lansdowne, etc., 10th Earl of Shelburne, etc., 10th Earl of Kerry, 28th Baron Kerry	William Rudolph Michael Feilding ("Rollo"); 1943–1995; 11th Earl Denbigh, etc. 10th Earl of Desmond, etc., 10th Baron St. Liz
Edward John Hallam Bigham b. 1966; 5th Viscount Mersey, etc., 14th Lord Nairne	Charles Richard Petty Bigham b. 1967 heir presumptive to the Viscountcy of Mersey	Simon Henry George Petty-Fitzmaurice b. 1970 styled Earl of Kerry; heir apparent to the marquessate of Landsdowne, earldoms of Shelburne and Kerry, and the barony of Kerry	Alexander Stephen Rudolph Feilding b. 1970; 12th Earl Denbigh, etc. 11th Earl of Desmond, etc., 11th Baron St. Liz
Flora Bigham b. 2003 styled Mistress of Nairne	George Henry Charles Petty-Fitzmaurice b. 2020 styled Viscount Calne and Calston	Orlando Gregory Danger Feilding b. 2009 styled Viscount Feilding; heir apparent to the earldoms of Denbigh and Desmond and the barony of St. Liz

== See also ==
- Earl of Desmond (1619 creation)
- Duke of Ormonde
- Baron Butler
