= Butler dynasty =

Noble family of Ireland

Butler de Buitléir
- noble house
- Country: Lordship of Ireland
- Founded: 1185; 841 years ago
- Founder: Theobald Walter, 1st Chief Butler of Ireland
- Titles: Duke of Ormonde; Marquess of Ormonde; Earl of Ossory; Earl of Ormond; Earl of Kilkenny; Earl of Carrick; Earl of Glengall; Earl of Arran; Earl of Gowran; Viscount Thurles; Viscount Mountgarret; Viscount Galmoye; Viscount Clonmore; Viscount Ikerrin; Baron Dunboyne; Baron Cahir; Baron Mountgarret of Nidd; Butler Baronetcies

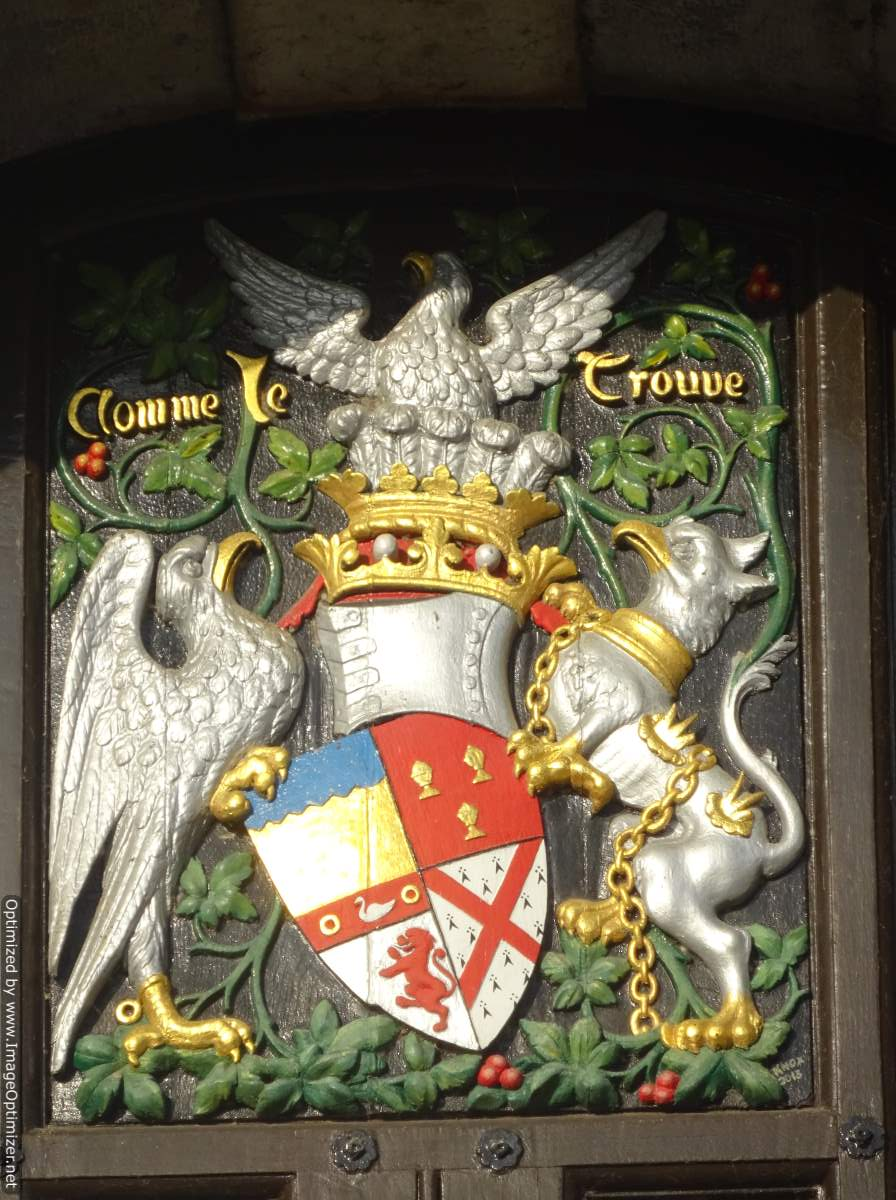
Butler arms at Kilkenny Castle

Butler (Irish: de Buitléir) is the name of a Hiberno-Norman noble family whose members were, for several centuries, prominent in the administration of the Lordship of Ireland and the Kingdom of Ireland. They rose to their highest prominence as Dukes of Ormonde. The family has produced multiple titles such as Baron Cahir, Baron Dunboyne, Viscount Ikerrin, Viscount Galmoye, Viscount Mountgarret, Viscount Thurles, Earl of Carrick, Earl of Kilkenny, Earl of Ormond, Earl of Ossory, Marquess of Ormonde and Duke of Ormonde. Variant spellings of the name include le Boteler and le Botiller. The Butlers were descendants of Anglo-Norman lords who participated in the Norman invasion of Ireland in the 12th century. The surname has its origins in the hereditary office of "Butler (cup-bearer) of Ireland", originating with Theobald Walter, 1st Chief Butler of Ireland. The arms of later family members depicted three cups in recognition of their original office.

== Origin ==
The family descended from Theobald Walter (d. 1205), eldest son of Hervey Walter and Maud de Valoignes. During the reign of Henry II of England Theobald held the position of pincerna (Latin) or boteillier (Norman French), the ceremonial cup-bearer or butler to Prince John, Lord of Ireland. He also held the office of Chief Butler of England and was the High Sheriff of Lancashire during 1194.

His younger brother Hubert Walter (c.1160–1205) became the Archbishop of Canterbury and Justiciar and Lord Chancellor of England.

== Butlers of Ormond ==
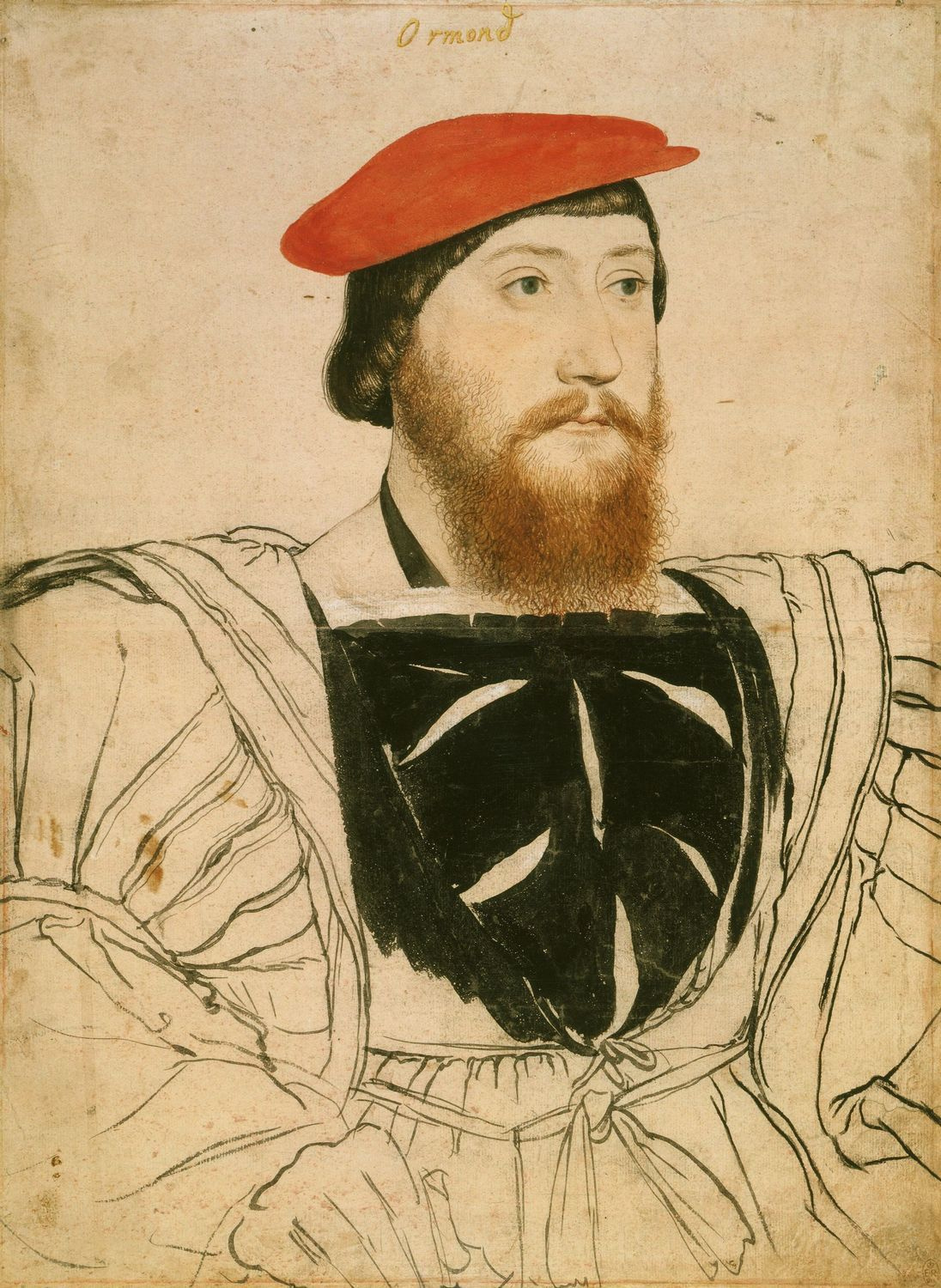
James Butler, 9th Earl of Ormond (1496–1546), by Hans Holbein.

The Ormond line is the senior branch of the family and later produced the Earls, Marquesses and Dukes of Ormond.

Edmund Butler was created the first Earl of Carrick in 1315 in reward for his service during the Bruce campaign in Ireland. Although the earldom did not pass to his son James, the latter was created the first Earl of Ormond in 1328 by Edward III.

Subsidiary titles for the earl in the Peerage of Ireland were later added: Earl of Ossory (1538) and Viscount Thurles (1536). James Butler, 12th Earl of Ormond served as the commander of the Cavalier forces in Ireland and was made Marquess of Ormond in 1642, which title became extinct in 1758. He was made Duke of Ormonde in 1661, and with the title created in the Peerage of England in 1682; after 1682, the spelling "Ormonde" was used almost universally. Subsidiary titles for the duke in the Peerage of England were added: Earl of Brecknock (1660) and Baron Butler (1660).

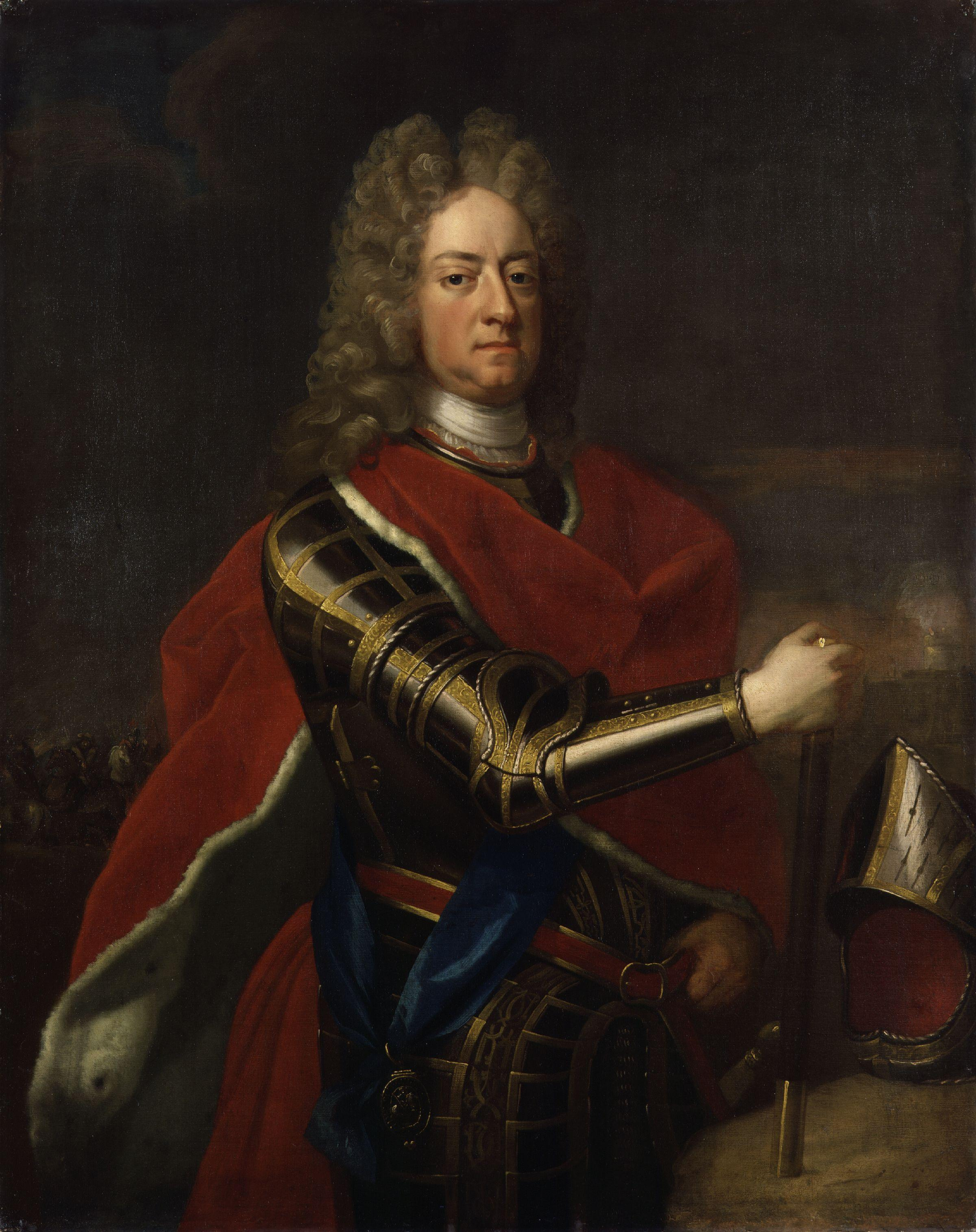
James Butler, 2nd Duke of Ormonde; a Jacobite sympathiser, his titles became forfeit in 1715

James Fitzjames Butler succeeded his grandfather and became the second duke. Accused of treason during the Jacobite rising of 1715, he was attainted and his English peerages declared forfeit. In 1758 his brother Charles, the de jure third duke (Irish), died and the dukedom and marquessate became extinct.

The eighteenth earl, James Wandesford Butler, was created as Baron Ormonde of Llanthony, in the county of Monmouth in the Peerage of the United Kingdom in 1821 on the coronation of George IV. Later, he was created the Marquess of Ormonde in the Peerage of Ireland in 1816. On his death in 1820, that title became extinct and the earldoms passed to his brother, for whom the title "Marquess of Ormonde" was re-created in the Peerage of the United Kingdom in 1825. That title became extinct in 1997, while the earldom became dormant.

=== Lands ===
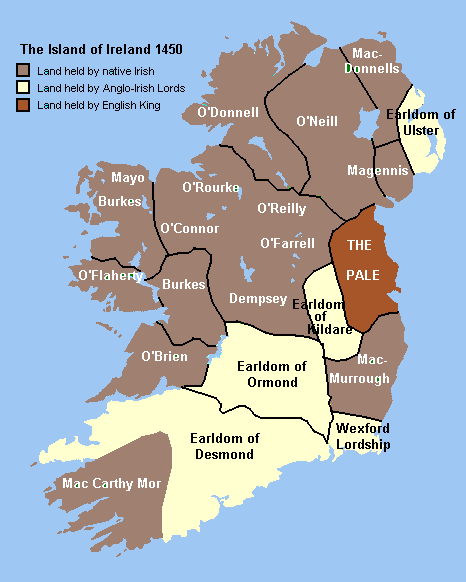
The Lordship of Ireland in 1450 Norman Lordships and native kingdoms.

The family seat, since 1391, was Kilkenny Castle; their main estate was previously at Gowran Castle. From Kilkenny, the Butlers claimed overlordship of the surrounding Gaelic kingdoms of Ormond, Éile, Ikerrin and part of Osraige.

The patrimony of the Butlers of Ormond encompassed most of the modern counties of Tipperary, Kilkenny and parts of County Carlow. Only the earldom of Desmond would have had more extensive land holdings than Ormond in the Lordship and Kingdom of Ireland. Following the successful Norman Invasion, the ancient Gaelic lands would have been annexed to the crown and passed as baronies or fiefs to the supporters of the crown (the victorious barons). These (administrative) baronies corresponded to the (Irish) túath ("country") or trícha cét ("thirty hundred [men]") of a Gaelic chief, for example Éile. However, sometimes baronies combined small territories, or split a large one, or were created without regard for the earlier boundaries. In the Norman period most Gaelic chiefs were killed, expelled, or subordinated by the new Norman lord; in the Tudor period, many Gaelic and Hibernicized lords retained their land by pledging allegiance to the Crown under the policy of surrender and regrant.

In 1837, the remains of the following Butler castles were recorded in County Kilkenny alone by Lewis.

"Granny or Grandison Castle, in Iverk, is one of the most considerable: it was the residence of Margaret Fitzgerald, the great Countess of Ormond, a lady of uncommon talents and qualifications, who is said also to have built the castles of Balleen and Coolkill, with several others of minor note. The Butlers owned the castles of Knocktopher, Gowran, Dunfert, Poolestown, Nehorn, Callan, Ballycallan, Damagh, Kilmanagh, and Urlingford..... The castles of Drumroe, Barrowmount, and Low Grange, are said to have belonged to Lord Galmoy;"

Members of the Butler family continued to live in Kilkenny Castle until 1935.

=== Notable family members ===
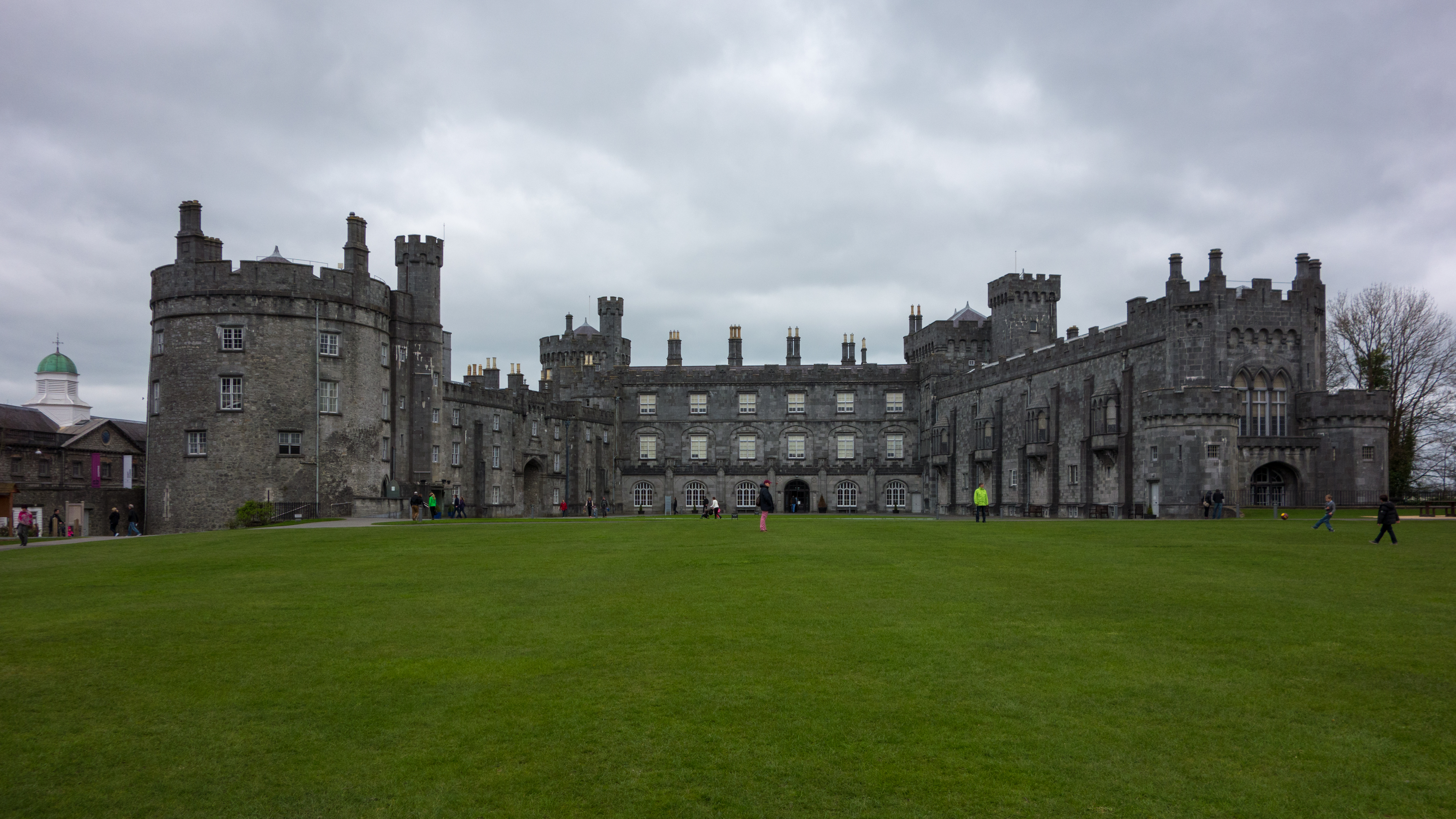
Kilkenny Castle, Ireland

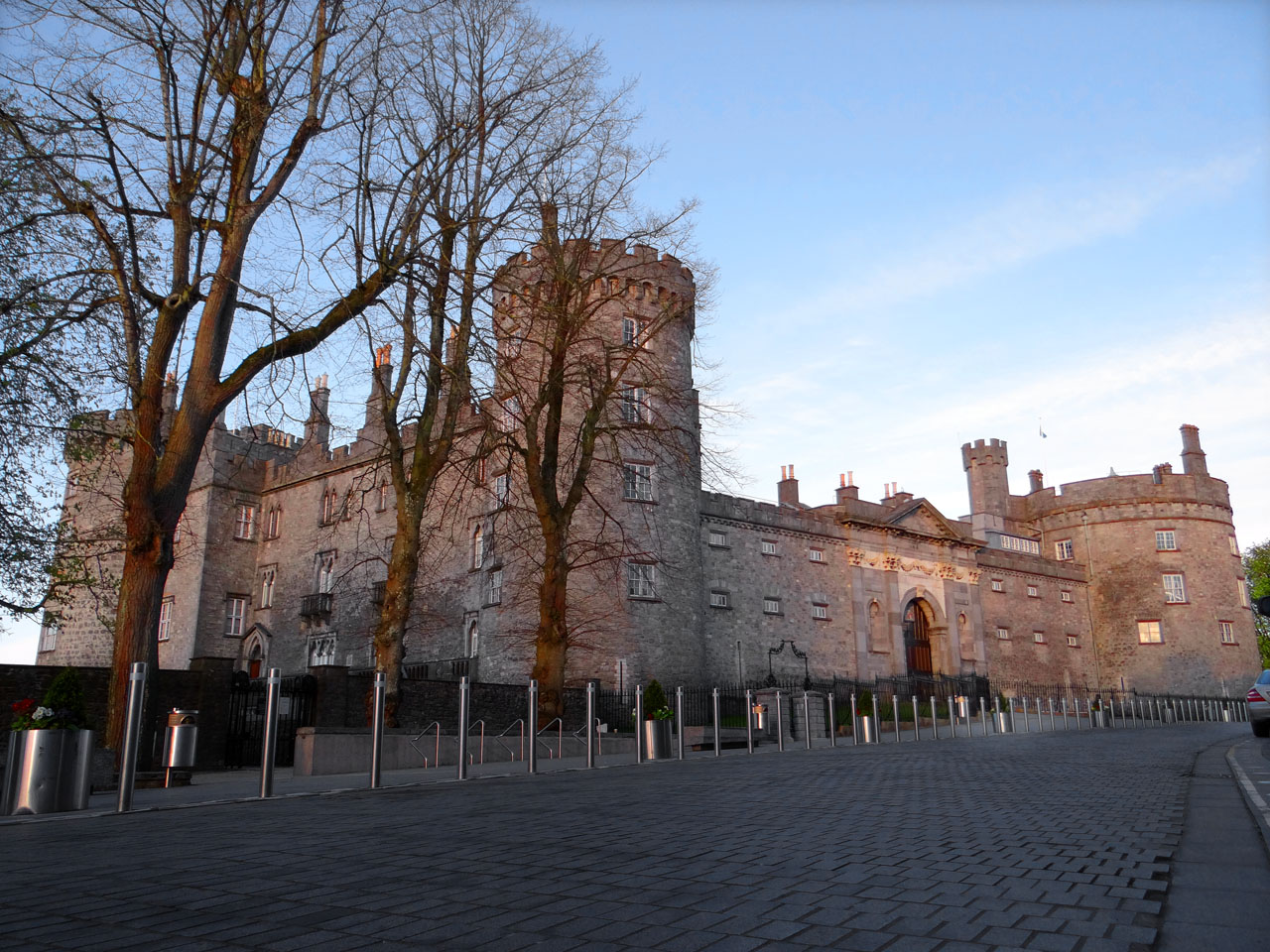
Kilkenny Castle, side view

- Theobald Walter, 1st Chief Butler of Ireland (died 1206) married Maud de Vavasour; they had three children
- Theobald le Botiller, 2nd Chief Butler of Ireland (died 1230) married Joan de Marais
- Theobald Butler, 3rd Chief Butler of Ireland (1224–1248) married Margery de Burgh; they had four children
- Theobald Butler, 4th Chief Butler of Ireland (1242–1285) married Joan FitzJohn FitzGeoffrey; they had three children
- Edmund Butler, Earl of Carrick (1270–1321) married Joan FitzGerald, Countess of Carrick; they had two children
- James Butler, 1st Earl of Ormond (1305–1338) married Eleanor de Bohun; they had six children
- James Butler, 2nd Earl of Ormond (1331–1382) married Elizabeth Darcy; they had five children
- James Butler, 3rd Earl of Ormond (died 1405) married Anne Welles; they had five children
- James Butler, 4th Earl of Ormond (1392–1452) married Joan de Beauchamp; they had three children
- James Butler, 5th Earl of Ormond (1420–1461)
- John Butler, 6th Earl of Ormond (died 1478)
- Thomas Butler, 7th Earl of Ormond (1426–1515) married Anne Hankford
- Piers Butler, 8th Earl of Ormond (1467-1539)

== Butlers of Dunboyne ==
The Baron Dunboyne peerage originated with Thomas Butler, 1st Baron Dunboyne (1271–1329), the son of Theobald Butler, 4th Chief Butler of Ireland.

=== Notable family members ===
- Thomas Butler, 1st Baron Dunboyne (1271–1329)
- John Butler, 12th Baron Dunboyne (1731 – 7 May 1800)

== Butlers of Clonamicklon and Ikerrin ==
This branch sprang from John Butler of Clonamicklon (1305–1330), the youngest son of Edmund Butler, Earl of Carrick (1268–1321) and Joan FitzGerald, Countess of Carrick (1282–1320). He was the brother of James Butler, 1st Earl of Ormond (1305–1337). From this branch descended the Viscounts Ikerrin and the Earls of Carrick (of the second creation).

=== Notable family members ===
- Pierce Butler, 4th Viscount Ikerrin (1679–1711). He married twice. First to the Hon. Alicia Boyle then to Olivia St. George
- Thomas Butler, 6th Viscount Ikerrin (1683–1720). He married Margaret Hamilton. They had one child. He was born in Kilkenny, Ireland.
- Somerset Hamilton Butler, 1st Earl of Carrick (1718–1774). He married Lady Juliana Boyle. They had one child. The 8th Viscount was created Earl of Carrick – the second time that an earldom of that name was created for the Butler family. The first creation was for Edmund Butler, Earl of Carrick.
- Henry Butler, 2nd Earl of Carrick (1746–1813). He married Sarah Taylor. They had two children. He died in Kilkenny, Ireland.
- Somerset Butler, 3rd Earl of Carrick (1779–1838), brother of the Hon. Henry Edward Butler (1780–1856) he married twice and had five children
- Gina Fratini (Georgina Butler, 1931–2017), the English fashion designer, was the granddaughter of Charles Butler, 7th Earl of Carrick

== Butlers of Cahir ==
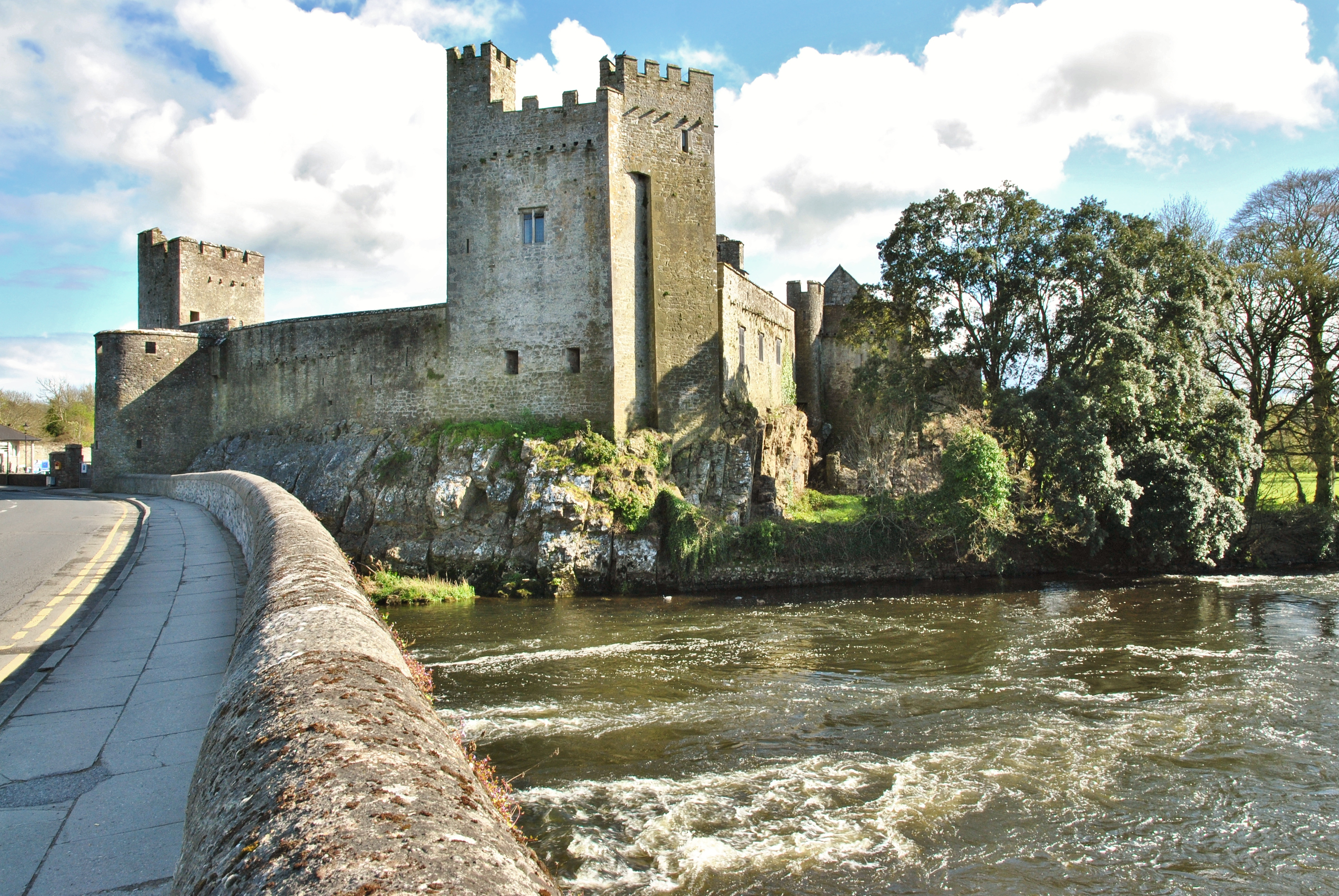
Cahir Castle, Tipperary County, Ireland

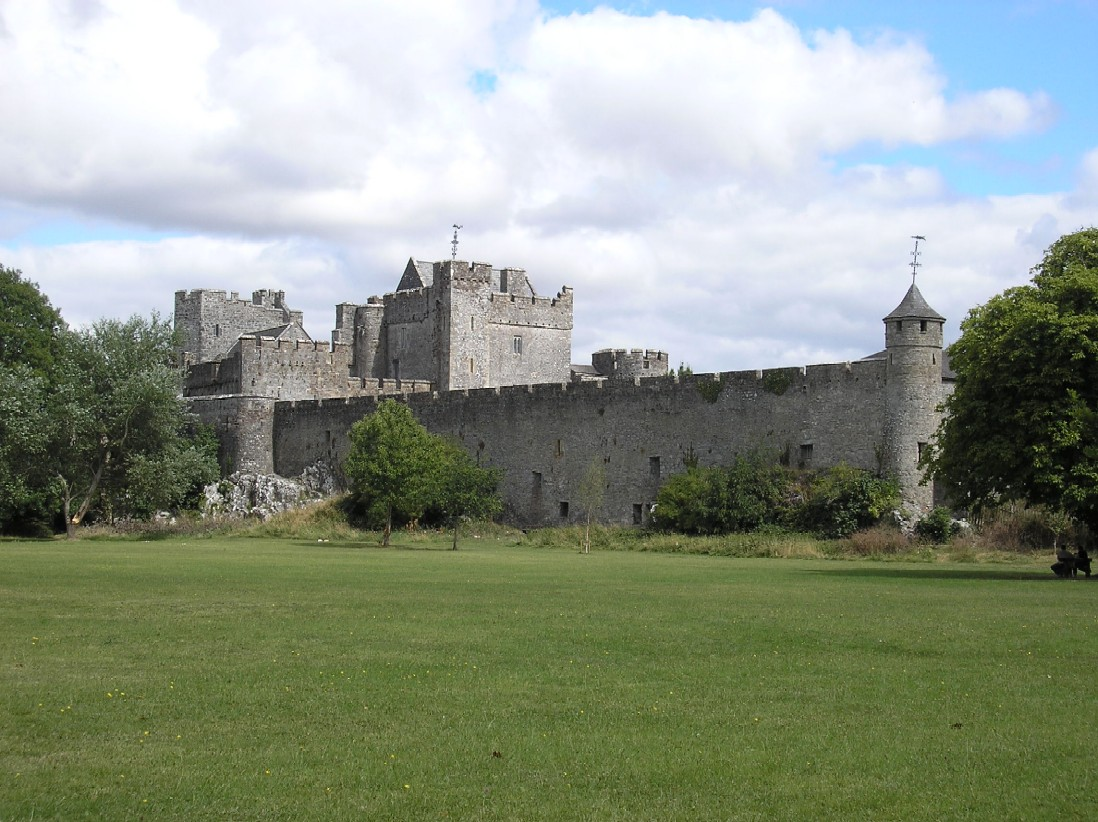
Cahir Castle, view of the walls

This branch sprang from James Butler, 3rd Earl of Ormond (died 1405). The family seat, Cahir Castle, is built on an island in the River Suir. Much of the barony of Iffa and Offa West was controlled by the Butler Barons Cahir.

=== Notable family members ===
- Thomas Butler of Cahir (died 1476)

==== Barons of the first creation ====
- Thomas Butler, 1st Baron Cahir (died 1558), son of Thomas Butler of Cahir. His brother, Piers Butler of Cahir, would later supply future barons when his own line failed to produce any other male heirs upon the death of his own son.
- Edmund Butler, 2nd Baron Cahir (died 1560), son of the 1st baron. Died without issue.

==== Barons of the second creation ====
- Theobald Butler, 1st Baron Cahir (died 1596), son of Piers Butler and nephew of the 1st Baron of the first creation.
- Thomas Butler, 2nd Baron Cahir (died 1627), son of the 1st Baron. Died without a male heir.
- Thomas Butler, 3rd Baron Cahir, son of Piers Butler, cousin of the 1st Baron of the second creation and grandson of the 1st Baron of the first creation. Richard Butler, 10th Baron Caher was created Earl of Glengall (Peerage of Ireland) in 1816.

== Butlers of Polestown and Roscrea ==
This branch also sprang from the 3rd Earl. Three distinct branches are associated with this branch of the family. The family tree splits firstly with Edmund MacRichard Butler; his eldest son, Sir James, founded the most illustrious sub-branch with his progeny going on to supply the 8th Earl of Ormond; his second son, Walter, founded the lesser sub-branch with his progeny going on to become baronets of Polestown. This sub-branch split thirdly to found a Roscrea branch in the barony of Ikerrin, County Tipperary, beginning with Walter's grandson.

Note: "Polestown" is also spelled in the records as Poolestown". It is now identified with the town of Paulstown in Gowran, County Kilkenny.

=== Notable family members ===
- Sir Richard Butler of Polestown (1395–1443)
- Walter Butler of Polestown (died 1483)
- Sir Richard Butler (Poletown) (died 1619)
- Edmond Butler of Polestown (died 1636)
- Peter Butler of Roscrea
- Walter Butler of Roscrea

== Butlers of Mountgarret, Cloughgrennan, Kilcash & Duiske ==
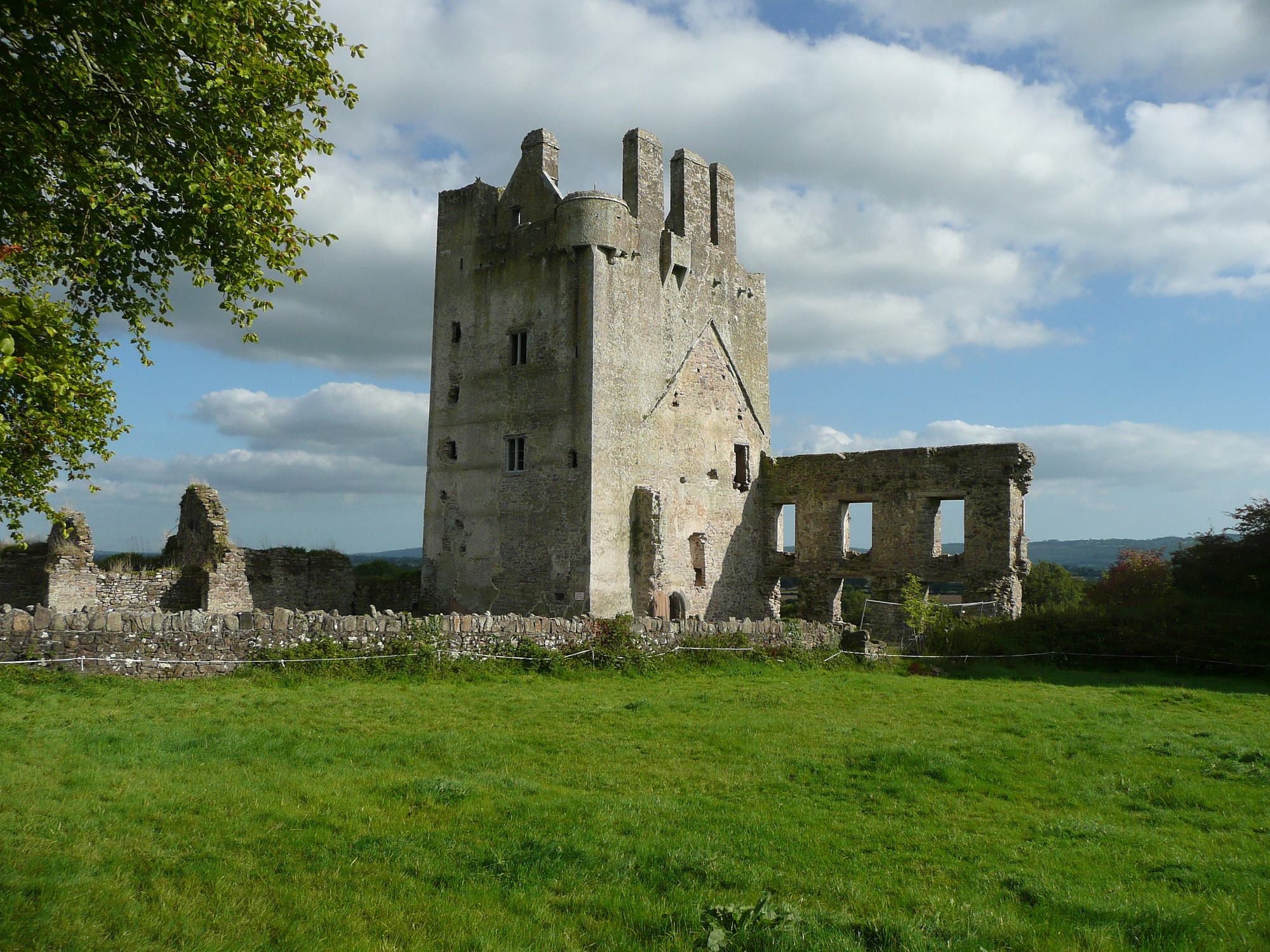
Kilcash Castle, Ireland

The common ancestor here is Piers Butler, 8th Earl of Ormond. Three minor family branches sprang from his eldest son – James; Cloughgrenan, Kilcash and Duiske / Galmoye, His younger son, Richard Butler, founded the junior but long lasting Mountgarret line.

Senior line – earls of Ormond, heirs of the 8th earl
Mountgarret line – heirs of the second son of the 8th earl
Cloughgrenan line – heirs of the second son of the 9th earl
Kilcash and Thurles line – heirs of the third son of the 9th earl
Garryricken line – heirs of the third son of the 11th earl
Duiske and Galmoye line – heirs of the 10th earl

=== Butlers of Mountgarret ===
Mountgarret may take its name from the townland of Tifeaghna (Mount Garret) in the civil parish of Sheefin, in the barony of Galmoy or from Clomantagh (Mount Garret) in the civil parish of Clomantagh in the County of Crannagh. Both baronies are in the northwestern corner of County Kilkenny. The Viscounts are recorded as significant landowners there (where they occupied lands around Clomantagh Castle for many centuries), as well as holding lands in the neighbouring civil parish of Coolcashin. It may also refer to a district of the town of New Ross in County Wexford. This branch was in turn an offshoot of the Polestown branch. In 1911 the 14th Viscount Mountgarret was created Baron Mountgarret of Nidd, West Riding, Yorkshire in the Peerage of the United Kingdom.

==== Notable family members ====
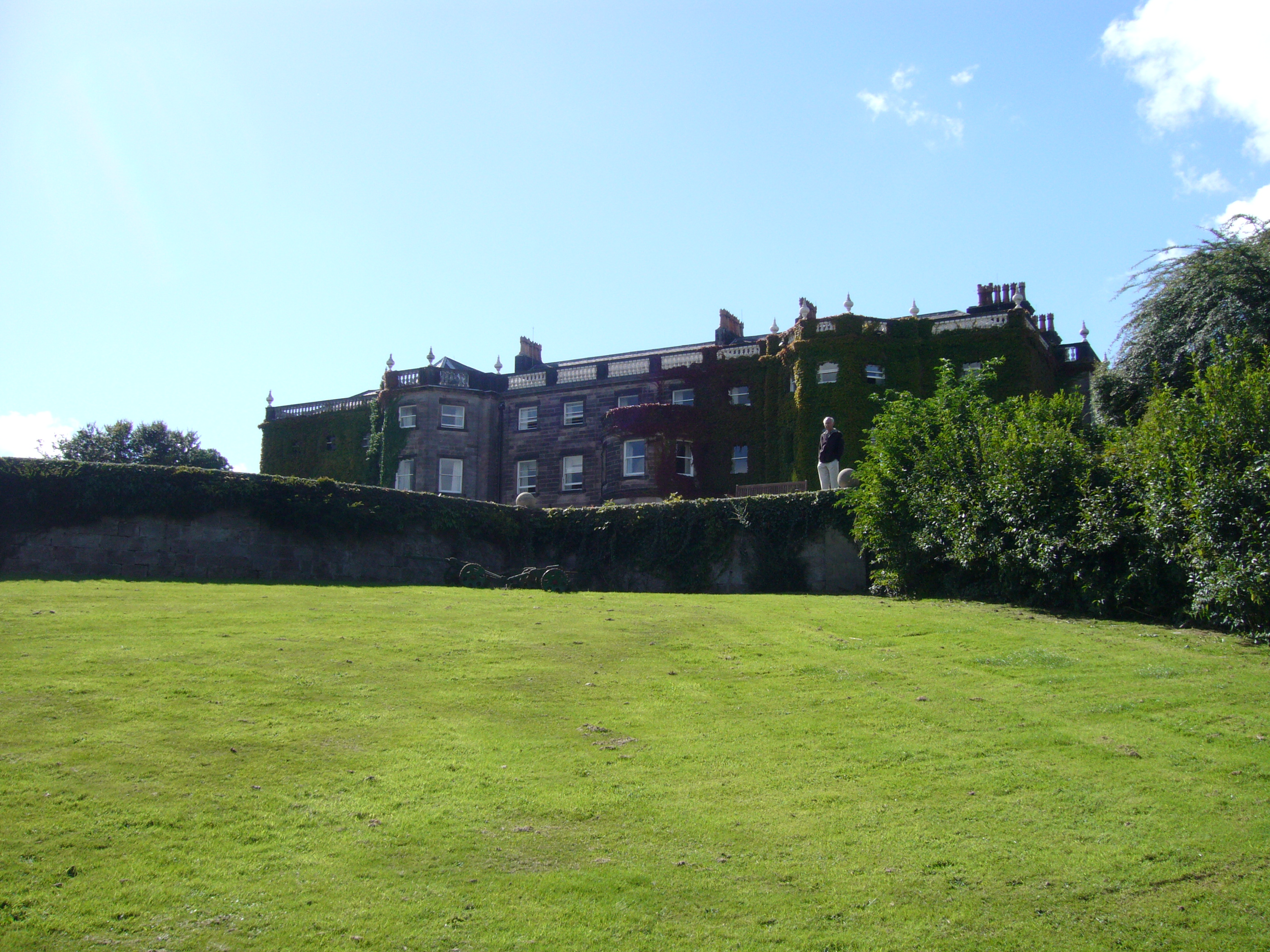
Nidd Hall, North Yorkshire, England

- Richard Butler, 1st Viscount Mountgarret (1500–1571)
- Edmund Butler, 2nd Viscount Mountgarret (died 1602)
- Richard Butler, 3rd Viscount Mountgarret (1578–1651)
- Edmund Butler, 4th Viscount Mountgarret (1595–1679)
- Edmund Butler, 10th Viscount Mountgarret (died 1752)
- Edmund Butler, 11th Viscount Mountgarret (1745–1793)
- Edmund Butler, 1st Earl of Kilkenny (1771–1846)
- Henry Butler, 13th Viscount Mountgarret (1816–1900)
- Henry Butler, 14th Viscount Mountgarret (1844–1912)
- Edmund Butler, 15th Viscount Mountgarret (1875–1918)
- Piers Butler, 16th Viscount Mountgarret (1903–1957)
- Richard Butler, 17th Viscount Mountgarret (1936–2004)
- Piers Butler, 18th Viscount Mountgarret (born 1961)

=== Butlers of Cloughgrenan ===
The second son of James Butler, 9th Earl of Ormond was Sir Edmund Butler of Cloughgrenan who occupied lands at Cloughgrenan (a townland near Carlow town). Tulleophelim (or Tullowphelim) is near the town of Tullow in County Carlow. The castle of Tulleophlim had been built by James Butler, 4th Earl of Ormond before 1450.

==== Notable family members ====
- Sir Edmund Butler of Cloughgrenan (c. 1531 – 1602),
- Theobald Butler, Viscount Butler of Tulleophelim, a son of Sir Edmund.
- Sir Thomas Butler of Cloughgrenan, 1st Baronet, illegitimate son of Sir Edmund.
- Sir Edmund Butler of Cloughgrenan, 2nd Baronet, son of 1st Baronet.

=== Butlers of Kilcash and Thurles ===
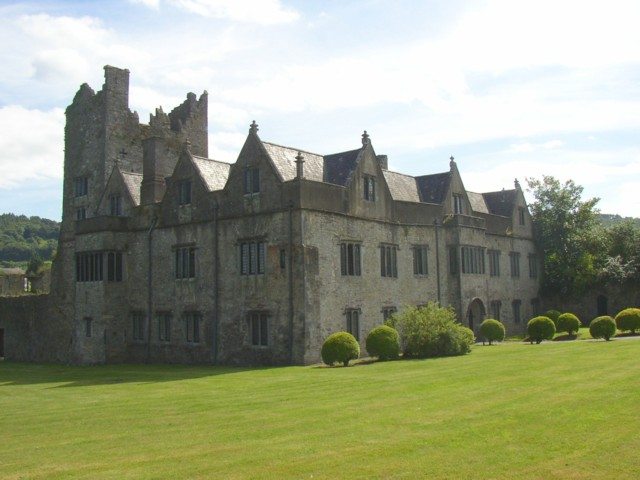
Ormonde Castle, Carrick-on-Suir

The third son of James Butler, 9th Earl of Ormond, was John who occupied lands in Kilcash, near Clonmel, County Tipperary. His heirs went on to provide four immediate heirs to the earldom of Ormond when the senior line failed through lack of legitimate male issue.

==== Notable family members ====
- John Butler of Kilcash
- Walter Butler, 11th Earl of Ormond, son of John and the first member of the Kilcash branch to inherit the earldom when the senior branch failed to leave legitimate male issue.
- Thomas Butler, Viscount Thurles, son of the 11th Earl who predeceased his father.
- James Butler, 1st Duke of Ormonde, heir of Thomas, grandson of the 11th earl.
- Thomas Butler, 6th Earl of Ossory, son of the 1st Duke who predeceased his father.
- James Butler, 2nd Duke of Ormonde, son of the 6th Earl of Ossory and grandson of the 1st Duke.
- Charles Butler, 3rd Duke of Ormonde, younger son of the 6th Earl of Ossory.
- Richard Butler of Kilcash, son of Viscount Thurles and younger brother of James, the 1st Duke.

==== Butlers of Garryricken ====
This branch is an offshoot of the Kilcash branch. Garryricken is a townland in the barony of Kells, County Kilkenny.

===== Notable family members =====
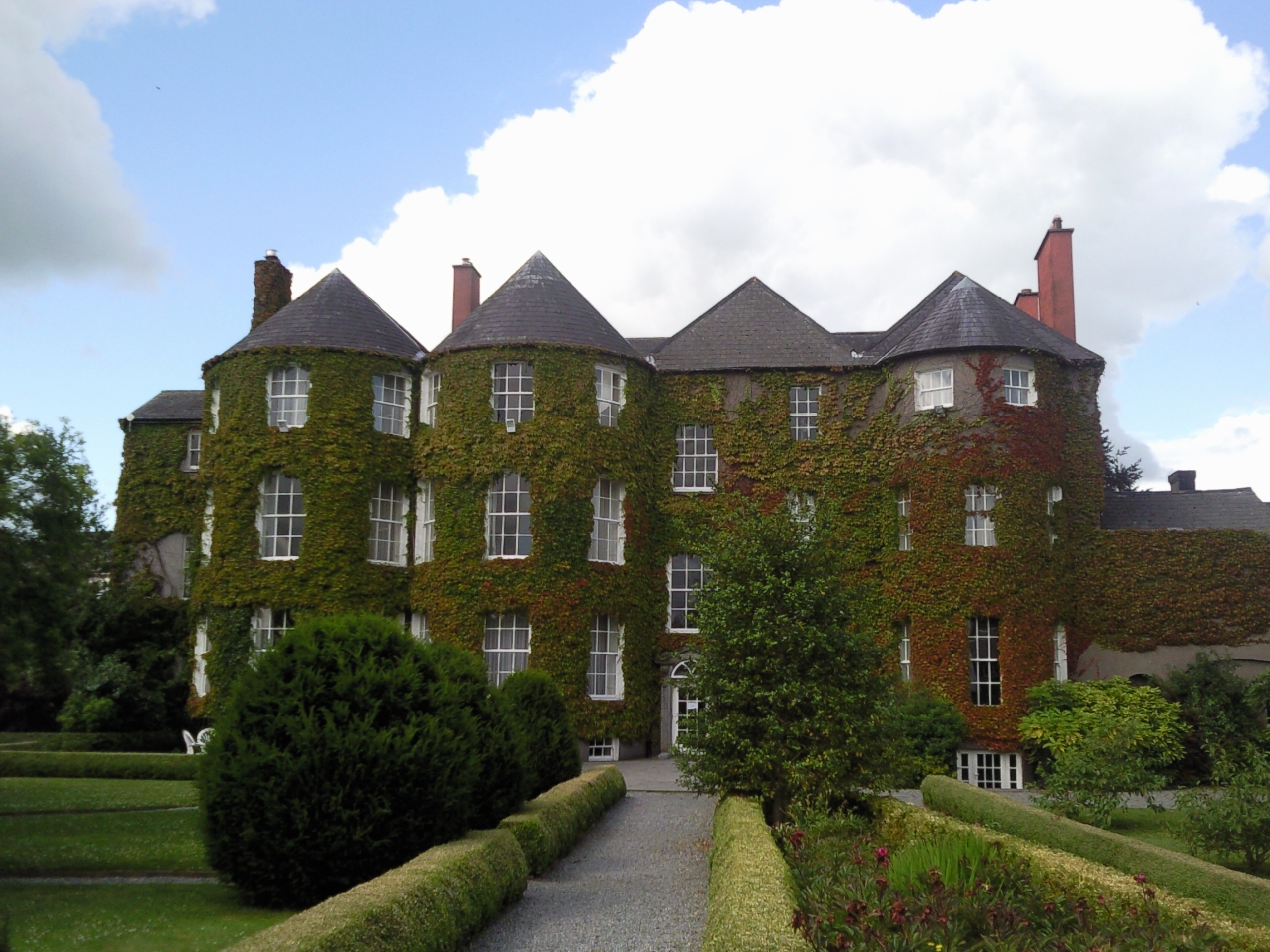
Butler House, Kilkenny, Ireland

- Walter Butler of Garryricken, eldest son of Richard Butler of Kilcash, great-grandson of the 11th Earl.
- Colonel Thomas Butler of Garryricken, eldest son of Walter.
- John Butler, 15th Earl of Ormonde, son of Colonel Thomas, great-grandnephew of the 1st Duke. He succeeded to the earldom (but not the dukedom) when the last member of senior Kilcash line, Charles, failed to produce a legitimate male heir.
- John Butler of Garryricken, second son of Walter and brother of Colonel Thomas, grand-nephew of the 1st Duke.
- Walter Butler, 16th Earl of Ormonde, son of John, great-great-great-grandson of the 11th Earl and the first cousin of the 15th Earl.
- Eleanor Butler, one of the two Ladies of Llangollen.

=== Butlers of Duiske and Galmoye ===
Duiske takes its name from Duiske Abbey in Graiguenamanagh, County Kilkenny. Galmoy is a village in the Barony of Galmoy, northwestern Kilkenny. This branch also sprang from the 9th Earl. His younger son was James Butler of Duiske.

==== Notable family members ====
- James Butler of Duiske was awarded the Abbey lands upon the dissolution of the monasteries following the English Reformation. The lands eventually reverted to his uncle Thomas Butler, 10th Earl of Ormond.
- Piers FitzThomas Butler of Duiske, who was the illegitimate son of the 10th Earl.
- Edward Butler, 1st Viscount Galmoye, who was the son of Piers FitzThomas Butler.
- Piers Butler of Duiske, who was the eldest son of the 1st Viscount.
- Edward Butler, 2nd Viscount Galmoye, who was the grandson of the 1st Viscount.
- Piers Butler, 3rd Viscount Galmoye, who was the eldest son of the 2nd Viscount. He was attainted and had no living male heirs.
- Richard Butler of Galmoye, who was the second son of the 2nd Viscount.
- James Butler of the Irish Brigade in France was son of Richard Butler of Galmoye and the grandson of the 2nd Viscount.
- Edmond Butler of Killoshulan, who was the brother of the 2nd Viscount.

== Sub-families and houses ==
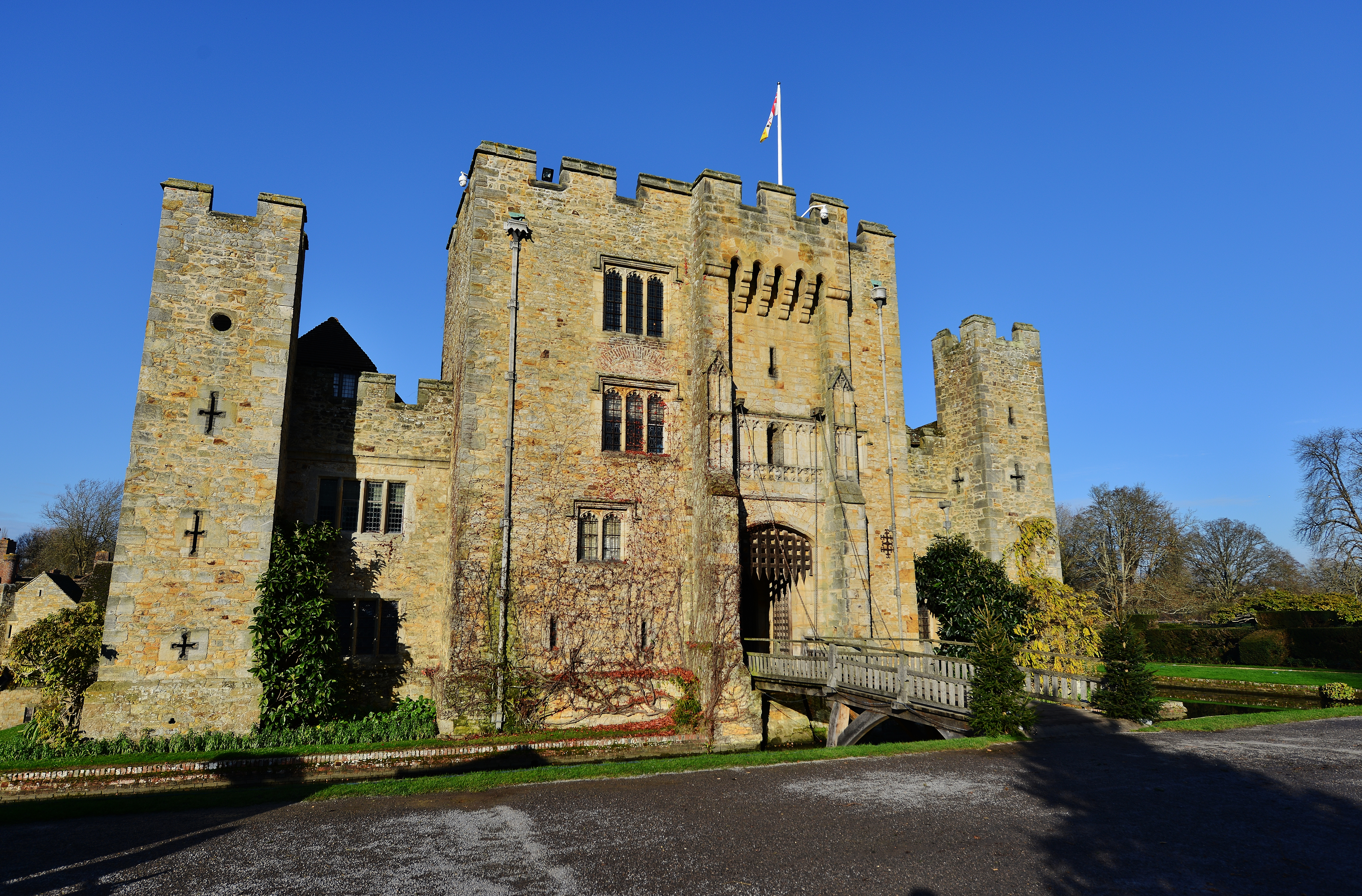
Hever Castle, Kent, England

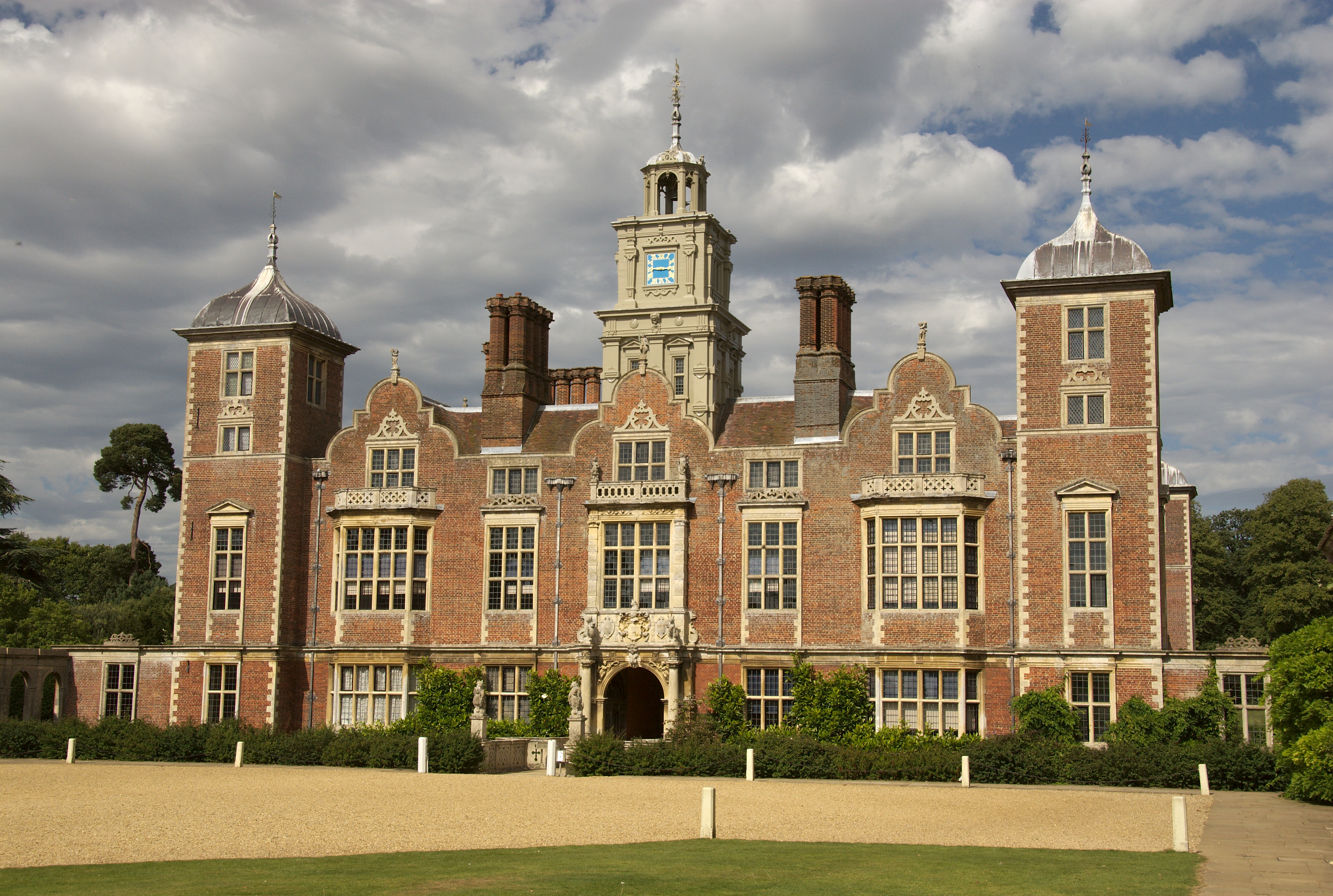
Blickling Hall, Gardens and Park

House Butler was a large dynasty with many titles, large amounts of land and a considerable amount of wealth, with close ties to the royal families of England and later other countries. Consequently, it has numerous descendants and sub-houses throughout the world, particularly in Ireland, Scotland, Wales and England.

For example, Lady Margaret Butler of Kilkenny Castle was married to Sir William Boleyn of Blickling Hall and Hever Castle and was the grandmother of Queen Anne Boleyn, wife of Henry VIII of the House of Tudor, connecting the Butler family to the Tudor dynasty. The Butler family has expanded going to America.

== See also ==
- Irish nobility
- Baron Dunboyne
- Baron Butler
- Butler baronets
- Inislounaght Abbey
- Butler–FitzGerald dispute
- Butler of Scotland

== Family tree ==
Butler dynasty family tree including the Earls of Carrick and Irish Earls of Ormond

Theobald Walter; 1165–1206; 1st Chief Butler of Ireland
Theobald le Botiller; 1201–1230; 2nd Chief Butler of Ireland
Theobald Butler; 1224–1248; 3rd Chief Butler of Ireland
King Edward I 1239–1307	Theobald Butler; 1242–1285; 4th Chief Butler of Ireland
Earl of Carrick (1st creation), 1315	Baron Dunboyne (by prescription), 1324
Elizabeth of Rhuddlan; 1282–1316	Theobald Butler; 1269–1299; 5th Chief Butler of Ireland	Edmund Butler; 1268–1321; Earl of Carrick	Thomas Butler; 1271–1329; 1st Baron Dunboyne
Earldom of Carrick (1st creation) extinct, 1321
Earl of Ormond (1st creation), 1328)
Eleanor de Bohun; 1304–1363	James Butler; 1304–1338; 1st Earl of Ormonde	John Butler of Clonamicklon; 1305–1330	Piers Butler; 1294–1370; 2nd Baron Dunboyne
James Butler; 1331–1382; 2nd Earl of Ormonde	Edmund of Lismalin; 1325-1372	Thomas Butler; 1345–1370; 3rd Baron Dunboyne	William Butler; 1355–1406; 4th Baron Dunboyne
James Butler c. 1359–1405; 3rd Earl of Ormonde	James Butler of Lismalin; 1361–1405	William Butler d. 1415; 5th Baron Dunboyne	William Butler d. 1419; 6th Baron Dunboyne	William Butler d. 1445; 7th Baron Dunboyne
James Butler; 1393–1452; 4th Earl of Ormonde	Richard Butler of Polestown; 1395–1443	James "Gallda" Butler	James Butler; 1400–1434	Edmond Butler d. 1498; 8th Baron Dunboyne
James Butler; 1420–1461; 5th Earl of Ormonde	John Butler d. 1476; 6th Earl of Ormonde	John Butler; 1426–1515; 7th Earl of Ormonde	Edmund MacRichard Butler of Polestown; 1420–1464	Pierce Butler; 1425–1526	James Butler d. 1508; 9th Baron Dunboyne
Margaret Butler c. 1454 – 1539	James Butler of Polestown d. 1487	Walter Butler of Polestown fl. 1483	James Butler; 1473–1538	James Butler d. 1538; 10th Baron Dunboyne
Earl of Ormond (2nd creation), 1529	Earl of Ossory, 1528	Baron Dunboyne (by patent), 1541
Thomas Boleyn c. 1477–1539; Earl of Ormond, Earl of Wiltshire	Piers Butler c. 1467–1539; 8th Earl of Ormond, 1st Earl of Ossory	Theobald Butler of Polestown	Piers Butler; 1521–1578	Edmond Butler d. 1566; 1st/11th Baron Dunboyne
Earldom of Ormonde (2nd creation) extinct, 1539	Earldom of Ormonde (1st creation) resigned, 1528 and restored, 1538
Viscount Thurles, 1536	Viscount Mountgarret, 1550
King Henry VIII; 1491–1547	Anne Boleyn c. 1501 or c. 1507 – 1536	James Butler; 1496–1546; 9th Earl of Ormond, 2nd Earl of Ossory, 1st Viscount Thurles	Richard Butler; 1500–1571; 1st Viscount Mountgarret	Eleanor Butler	Edmond Butler of Polestown	James Butler d. 1601	James Butler d. 1624; 2nd/12th Baron Dunboyne
Thomas Butler; 1531–1614; 10th Earl of Ormond, 3rd Earl of Ossory, 2nd Viscount Thurles	Edmund Butler of Cloughgrenan; 1534 – c. 1585	John Butler of Kilcash d. 1570	Edmund Butler c. 1562 – 1602; 2nd Viscount Mountgarret	John Butler d. 1602	Piers Butler d. 1626	Edward Butler
Baronet of Cloughgrenan, 1628	Viscount Butler of Tulleophelim, 1603
Piers FitzThomas Butler b. 1554	Thomas Butler c. 1578 – 1642; 1st Baronet of Cloughgrenan	Theobald Butler c. 1570 – 1613; Viscount Butler of Tulleophelim	Walter Butler; 1559–1633; 11th Earl of Ormond, 4th Earl of Ossory, 3rd Viscount Thurles	Helen Butler d. 1631	Richard Butler; 1578–1651; 3rd Viscount Mountgarret	Peter Butler of Roscrea	Richard Butler of Polestown d. 1619	Edmund Butler d. 1641
Viscountcy Butler of Tulleophelim extinct, 1613
Viscount Galmoye, 1646	Lord Dingwall, 1609	Viscount Ikerrin, 1629
Edward Butler d. 1653; 1st Viscount Galmoye	Edmund Butler d. c. 1650; 2nd Baronet of Cloughgrenan	Elizabeth Butler c. 1585 – 1628	Richard Preston d. 1628; Earl of Desmond, 1st Lord Dingwall	Thomas Butler a. 1596 – 1619 styled Viscount Thurles	Edmund Butler; 1595–1679; 4th Viscount Mountgarret	Walter Butler of Roscrea; 1600–1634	Edmond Butler of Polestown; 1595–1636	Pierce Butler; 1587–1661; 1st Viscount Ikerrin	Edmond Butler; 1595–1640; 3rd/13th Baron Dunboyne
Marquess of Ormonde (1st creation), 1642; Duke of Ormonde (Ireland), 1661; Duke of Ormonde (England), 1682	Baronet of Polestown, 1645
Piers Butler of Duiske d. 1650	Elizabeth Preston; 1615–1684; 2nd Baroness Dingwall, suo jure	James FitzThomas Butler; 1610–1688; 1st Duke of Ormond, etc., 12th Earl of Ormond, 5th Earl of Ossory, 4th Viscount Thurles	Richard Butler of Kilcash; 1615–1701	Walter Butler d. 1650; 1st Baronet of Polestown	James Butler c. 1616 – 1638	James Butler d. 1662; 4th/14th Baron Dunboyne	Pierce Butler d. 1690; 5th/15th Baron Dunboyne	James Butler
Earl of Arran (1st Irish creation), Viscount Tullogh (1st creation), Baron Butler of Cloughgrennan (1st creation), 1662
Baron Butler of Moore Park, 1666	Baron Butler of Weston (1st creation), 1673	Earl of Gowran, 1676
Edward Butler c. 1627 – after 1667; 2nd Viscount Galmoye	Thomas Butler d. 1703; 3rd Baronet of Cloughgrenan	Thomas Butler; 1634–1680; 13th Earl of Ormond, 6th Earl of Ossory, 5th Viscount Thurles, 1st Baron Butler	Richard Butler; 1639–1686; Earl of Arran, etc.	John Butler; 1643–1677; 1st Earl of Gowran	Richard Butler a. 1661 – 1707; 5th Viscount Mountgarret	Richard Butler d. c. 1679; 2nd Baronet of Polestown	Pierce Butler; 1637–1680; 2nd Viscount Ikerrin	James Butler d. 1701; 6th/16th Baron Dunboyne
Earldom of Arran (1st Irish creation) and subsidiary titles extinct, 1686	Earldom of Gowran extinct, 1677
Earl of Arran (2nd Irish creation), Viscount Tullogh (2nd creation), Baron Butler of Cloughgrennan (2nd creation), 1693; Baron Butler of Weston (2nd creation), 1694; Duke of Arran (Jacobite), 1722
Piers Butler; 1652–1740; Earl of Newcastle, 3rd Viscount Galmoye	Pierce Butler; 1670–1732; 4th Baronet of Cloughgrenan	James Butler d. c. 1720–1723	James FitzThomas Butler; 1665–1745; 2nd Duke of Ormond, etc., 14th Earl of Ormond, 7th Earl of Ossory, 6th Viscount Thurles, 3rd Lord Dingwall, 2nd Baron Butler	Charles Butler; 1671–1758; 3rd Duke of Ormond, de jure, Earl of Arran, etc.	Walter Butler of Garryricken d. 1700	Edmund Butler; 1663–1735; 6th Viscount Mountgarret	James Butler d. 1688; 3rd Viscount Ikerrin	Edward Butler
Viscountcy Galmoye extinct, 1697	Dukedom of Ormonde (England) forfeit by attainder, 1715, but Irish dukedom continued	Dukedom of Arran (Jacobite), dukedom of Ormonde (Ireland), earldom of Arran, and subsidiary titles, and barony Butler extinct, 1758
Richard Butler; 1699–1771; 5th Baronet of Cloughgrenan	Thomas Butler of Garryricken d. 1738	John Butler of Garryricken d. 1738	Richard Butler; 1685–1736; 7th Viscount Mountgarret	James Butler; 1686–1749; 8th Viscount Mountgarret	Edmund Butler; 1687–1751; 9th Viscount Mountgarret	Walter Butler c. 1678 – 1723; 3rd Baronet of Polestown	Pierce Butler; 1679–1711; 4th Viscount Ikerrin	Thomas Butler; 1683–1719; 6th Viscount Ikerrin	Pierce Butler d. 1718; 7th/17th Baron Dunboyne	Edmund Butler d. 1732; 8th/18th Baron Dunboyne
Earls of Carrick (2nd creation), 1748
Thomas Butler; 1735–1772; 6th Baronet of Cloughgrenan	John Butler of Kilcash and Garryricken c. 1720 – 1766; 15th Earl of Ormond, 8th Earl of Ossory de jure, 7th Viscount Thurles	Walter Butler of Kilcash and Garryricken; 1703–1783; 16th Earl of Ormond, 9th Earl of Ossory de jure, 8th Viscount Thurles	Edmund Butler d. 1779; 10th Viscount Mountgarret	Edmund Butler c. 1708 – 1762; 4th Baronet of Polestown	James Butler d. 1711; 5th Viscount Ikerrin	James Butler; 1714–1721; 7th Viscount Ikerrin	Somerset Butler; 1718–1774; 1st Earl of Carrick, 8th Viscount Ikerrin	Michael Butler d. 1776
Baronetcy Butler of Polestown extinct, 1762
Earldoms of Ormond and Ossory acknowledged, 1791
Richard Butler; 1761–1817; 7th Baronet of Cloughgrenan	John Butler; 1740–1795; 17th Earl of Ormond, 10th Earl of Ossory, 9th Viscount Thurles	Edmund Butler; 1745–1793; 11th Viscount Mountgarret	Henry Butler; 1746–1813; 2nd Earl of Carrick, 9th Viscount Ikerrin	James Butler d. 1768; 9th/19th Baron Dunboyne	Pierce Butler d. 1773; 10th/20th Baron Dunboyne	John Butler; 1731–1800; 12th/22nd Baron Dunboyne	James Butler d. 1784
Marquess of Ormonde (2nd creation)	Baron Ormonde of Llanthony, 1821
and Baron Butler of Llanthony, 1816	Marquess of Ormonde (3rd creation), 1825	Earl of Kilkenny, 1793
Thomas Butler; 1783–1861; 8th Baronet of Cloughgrenan	Walter Butler; 1770–1820; Marquess of Ormonde, etc., 18th Earl of Ormond, 11th Earl of Ossory, 10th Viscount Thurles, Baron Butler of Llanthony	James Butler; 1777–1838; 1st Marquess of Ormonde, etc., 19th Earl of Ormond, 12th Earl of Ossory, 10th Viscount Thurles	Edmund Butler; 1771–1846; Earl of Kilkenny, 12th Viscount Mountgarret	Henry Butler; 1773–1842	Somerset Butler; 1779–1838; 3rd Earl of Carrick, 10th Viscount Ikerrin	Henry Edward Butler; 1780–1856	Pierce Butler d. 1785; 11th/21st Baron Dunboyne	James Butler; 1780–1850; 13th/23rd Baron Dunboyne
Marquessate of Ormonde (1st creation), etc. extinct, 1820	Earldom of Kilkenny extinct, 1846
Richard Butler; 1813–1862; 9th Baronet of Cloughgrenan	John Butler; 1808–1854; 2nd Marquess of Ormonde, etc., 20th Earl of Ormond, 13th Earl of Ossory, 11th Viscount Thurles	Henry Butler; 1816–1900; 13th Viscount Mountgarret	Henry Butler; 1834–1846; 4th Earl of Carrick, 11th Viscount Ikerrin	Somerset Butler; 1835–1901; 5th Earl of Carrick, 12th Viscount Ikerrin	Charles George Butler; 1823–1854	Theobald Butler; 1806–1881; 14th/24th Baron Dunboyne
Thomas Butler; 1836–1909; 10th Baronet of Cloughgrenan	James Butler; 1844–1919; 3rd Marquess of Ormonde, etc., 21st Earl of Ormond, 14th Earl of Ossory, 12th Viscount Thurles	Arthur Butler; 1849–1943; 4th Marquess of Ormonde, etc., 22nd Earl of Ormond, 15th Earl of Ossory, 13th Viscount Thurles	James Theobald Butler; 1852–1929	Henry Butler; 1844–1912; 14th Viscount Mountgarret	Charles Butler; 1851–1909; 6th Earl of Carrick, 13th Viscount Ikerrin	James Clifford-Butler; 1839–1899; 15th/25th Baron Dunboyne	Robert Butler; 1844–1913; 16th/26th Baron Dunboyne
Baron Butler of Mount Juliet, 1912
Richard Butler; 1872–1955; 11th Baronet of Cloughgrenan	Arthur Butler; 1890–1949; 5th Marquess of Ormonde, etc., 23rd Earl of Ormond, 16th Earl of Ossory, 14th Viscount Thurles	Arthur Butler; 1890–1949; 6th Marquess of Ormonde, etc., 24th Earl of Ormond, 17th Earl of Ossory, 15th Viscount Thurles	Charles Butler; 1899–1997; 7th Marquess of Ormonde, etc., 25th Earl of Ormond, 18th Earl of Ossory, 16th Viscount Thurles	Edmund Butler; 1875–1918; 15th Viscount Mountgarret	Charles Butler; 1873–1931; 7th Earl of Carrick, 14th Viscount Ikerrin, 1st Baron Butler of Mount Juliet	Fitzwalter Butler; 1874–1945; 17th/27th Baron Dunboyne
Marquessate of Ormonde extinct, earldoms of Ormond and Ossory, and viscountcy Thurles dormant, 1997
Thomas Butler; 1910–1994; 12th Baronet of Cloughgrenan	James Butler; 1916–1940 styled Viscount Thuries	Piers Butler; 1903–1966; 16th Viscount Mountgarret	Theobald Butler; 1903–1957; 8th Earl of Carrick, 15th Viscount Ikerrin, 2nd Baron Butler of Mount Juliet
Richard Butler b. 1940; 13th Baronet of Cloughgrenan	Richard Butler; 1936–2004; 17th Viscount Mountgarret	Brian Butler; 1931–1992; 9th Earl of Carrick, 16th Viscount Ikerrin, 3rd Baron Butler of Mount Juliet	Patrick Butler; 1917–2004; 18th/28th Baron Dunboyne
Thomas Pierce Butler b. 1966	Piers Butler b. 1961; 18th Viscount Mountgarret	David Butler; 1953–2008; 10th Earl of Carrick, 17th Viscount Ikerrin, 4th Baron Butler of Mount Juliet	John Butler; 1951–2013; 19th/29th Baron Dunboyne
Heir presumptive to the baronetcy of Cloughgrenan	Heir presumptive to the earldoms of Ormonde and Ossory
Arion Butler b. 1975; 11th Earl of Carrick, 18th Viscount Ikerrin, 5th Baron Butler of Mount Juliet	Piers Butler b. 1979	Richard Butler b. 1983; 20th/30th Baron Dunboyne
Heir presumptive to the Earldom of Carrick
Theo Oliver Stafford Butler b. 2015	Caspian Fitzwalter Butler b. 2020
Heir apparent to the viscountcy Mountgarret	Heir apparent to the barony Dunboyne
