= Edmund Butler =

Edmund Butler may refer to:

- Edmund Butler, Earl of Carrick (c. 1270–1321)
- Sir Edmund Butler of Cloughgrenan (1534–1602)
- Edmund Butler (bishop) (died 1551), Irish archbishop of Cashel and illegitimate son of Piers Butler, 8th Earl of Ormond
- Edmund Butler, 2nd Baron Cahir (died 1560)
- Edmund Butler, 2nd Viscount Mountgarret (c. 1562–1602)
- Edmund Butler, 4th Viscount Mountgarret (1595–1679)
- Edmund Butler, 10th Viscount Mountgarret
- Edmund Butler, 11th Viscount Mountgarret (1745–1793), Irish peer and politician
- Edmund Butler, 1st Earl of Kilkenny (1771–1846)
- Edmund MacRichard Butler (c. 1420–1464)
- Sir Edmund Butler, 2nd Baronet (died c.1650)
- Edmund Butler (industrialist) (1848–1923)

== See also ==
- Edmond Butler (disambiguation)
- Butler baronets, several of whom were named Edmund
- Butler (surname)
