= John Butler (Irish Confederate) =

17th-century Irish Confederate soldier

Colonel John Butler was an officer of the Irish Confederate Army of the 1640s during the War of the Three Kingdoms.

He was the younger brother of Richard Butler, 3rd Viscount Mountgarret and part of the powerful Butler family of the Munster-Leinster border area. Of Old English descent, like most of the family he was a Roman Catholic. Butler took part in the unsuccessful 1644 Ulster Campaign as part of the Ulster Army under the command of James Tuchet, 3rd Earl of Castlehaven and Owen Roe O'Neill.

He was a cousin of James Butler, 1st Duke of Ormonde, the Lord Lieutenant and commander of the Royalist Irish Army.

== Bibliography ==
- Casway, Jerrold. Owen Roe O'Neill and the Struggle for Catholic Ireland. University of Pennsylvania Press, 1984.
