= Edmond Butler (disambiguation) =

Edmond Butler (1827–1895) was a U.S. Army officer and Medal of Honor recipient.

Edmond Butler may also refer to:

- Edmond Butler of Polestown (1595–1636), Member of Parliament for County Kilkenny, 1634–1635
- Edmond Butler, 3rd/13th Baron Dunboyne (1595–1640), Anglo-Irish nobleman
- Edmond Butler of Killoshulan (died 1691)

== See also ==
- Edmund Butler (disambiguation)
