= James Butler (Irish Brigade officer) =

Irish soldier and noble

Colonel James Butler was the son of Richard Butler of Galmoye and the grandson of Edward Butler, 2nd Viscount Galmoye. He was the heir of Piers Butler, 3rd Viscount Galmoye who died without male issue. However, Colonel Butler's succession to the viscountcy was not recognised. This was because an act of the Irish Parliament had declared the titles of the 3rd Viscount forfeit in 1697. He was a Colonel of the Irish Brigade in the service of France.

== Succession ==
When he died in 1770 without male issue, his titles (if they existed at all) were assumed by the illegitimate son of his youngest brother,
Captain Francis Piers Butler, of the Irish Brigade. Captain Butler married Catherine-Julie de Vallory following the birth of their son, Piers-Louis-Antoine. This Piers died issueless in 1826.

== See also ==
- Butler dynasty
- Edmond Butler of Killoshulan, later 5th Viscount Galmoye.
