= Joan Butler =

Joan Butler may refer to:

- Joan Fitzgerald, Countess of Ormond (c. 1509 or c. 1514 – 1565), Joan Butler, Norman-Irish noblewoman
- Joan Butler, Countess of Ormond (1396–1430), Welsh-born Anglo-Norman in Ireland
- Joan Butler, Countess of Carrick (1281–1320), Irish noblewoman
