= Piers Butler of Duiske =

Irish nobleman

Piers Butler of Duiske, Barrowmount, County Kilkenny (died 1650) was the son of Edward Butler, 1st Viscount Galmoye and Hon. Anne Butler, daughter of Edmund Butler, 2nd Viscount Mountgarret. He gained the rank of Colonel of Dragoons. After the Battle of Lambstown, County Wexford, he was taken prisoner, and was "killed, it is said after quarter being given" by the Cromwellian Captain William Bolton.

== Marriage and issue ==
He married Hon. Margaret Netterville, the daughter of Nicholas Netterville, 1st Viscount Netterville of Dowth, County Meath and his first wife Eleanor Bathe of Drumcondra. Their children were:

- Hon. Richard Butler, died without male issue
- Frances Butler, married Hervey Morres, grandfather of Hervey Morres, 1st Viscount Mountmorres
- Edward Butler, 2nd Viscount Galmoye (b. circa 1627, d. after 24 Oct 1667)
- Nicholas Butler (d. 1653)
- James Butler (d. 1678)
- Major Edmond Butler of Killoshulan (d. 12 Jul 1691)
- Jane Butler
- Mary Butler
- Elizabeth Grace
- Margaret Grace
- Eleanor Butler, married to William Grace, Esq., of Ballylinch

== See also ==
- Butler dynasty
