= Edmond Butler of Killoshulan =

Edmond Butler of Killoshulan, Duiske, County Kilkenny (died 12 July 1691) was the youngest son of Piers Butler of Duiske and Margaret Netterville, daughter of Nicholas Netterville, 1st Viscount Netterville. His grandfather was Edward Butler, 1st Viscount Galmoye. Killoshulan is a townland in the barony of Crannagh, County Kilkenny.

== Marriage and issue ==
He married Catherine Crispe, daughter of Nicholas Crispe, circa 1657. Their children were:

- Piers Butler (d. Jan 1716/17)
- Richard Butler

== Career and succession ==
Butler gained the rank of Major in 1689 in the service of the Colonel Edward Butler's Regiment of Horse which was in the army of King James II of England. He fought in the Battle of Aughrim and was killed in action.

Edmond's elder brother Edward succeeded their grandfather as Viscount Galmoye in 1653. Edward's son, the 3rd Viscount, was attainted in 1697 as a Jacobite. In 1826, when Edward's male line became extinct, Edmond's great-great-great-grandson, Garret Butler, petitioned for the viscountcy and the reversal of the attainder. The Attorney-General for Ireland and Solicitor-General for Ireland (Henry Joy and John Doherty) issued an opinion in 1828 that he would be entitled as senior male heir to the viscountcy if the attainder were reversed, but that would require an Act of Parliament. Garret Butler adopted the style Viscount Galmoy despite the lack of such an act.

== See also ==
- Butler dynasty
