= Pierce Butler, 4th Viscount Ikerrin =

Irish peer, politician, and soldier (c. 1677 – 1711)

Brigadier-General The Right Honourable The Viscount Ikerrin
- Born: Pierce Butler c. 1677; Ballylinch Castle, Thomastown, County Kilkenny, Ireland
- Died: 1711

Pierce Butler, 4th Viscount Ikerrin (c. 1677 – 1711) was an Irish peer, politician, and professional soldier who rose to the rank of brigadier general under Queen Anne. He was outlawed as a Jacobite in 1690, when he was probably still in his early teens, but was restored to his titles and estates in 1698.

Butler coat of arms: Gules, three covered cups or.

== Early life ==
He was the elder of the two sons of James Butler, 3rd Viscount Ikerrin, and his wife Eleanor Redman, daughter and co-heiress of Colonel Daniel Redman of Ballylinch Castle, Thomastown, County Kilkenny, and his wife Abigail Otway. His father was descended from John Butler of Clonamicklon (died 1330), who founded a junior branch of the great Butler dynastywhose head was the Duke of Ormonde. His mother's father was a Cromwellian army officer who purchased his estate in County Kilkenny from his brother-in-law, Captain John Joyner, who had begun his career as a cook in the household of King Charles I.

Pierce was born at his mother's family home, Ballylinch Castle, between 1677 and 1679. He was educated at Trinity College, Dublin. His grandfather, the 2nd Viscount, was a convert to the Church of Ireland, but his father and at least one of his aunts, Elizabeth (who married Sir John Meade, 1st Baronet), reverted to the Roman Catholic faith. For this reason, his father gained the favour of the Catholic King James II of England, and became a captain in the Grenadier Guards. The 3rd Viscount died of smallpox in London in October 1688 and Pierce succeeded to the title.

== Jacobite ==
James II was deposed after the Glorious Revolution of 1688 and fled to France, and from there invaded Ireland. He summoned a Parliament, generally called the Patriot Parliament, at Dublin, in 1689. It is often said that Pierce "sat" in the Irish House of Lords in that Parliament, but since he can scarcely have been more than twelve years old at the time, he was presumably only present by proxy. Even his notional attendance was enough to have him outlawed as a supporter of James after the ruin of James's cause at the Battle of the Boyne in 1690. However the great Butler dynasty, of which the Butlers of Ikerrin were a junior branch, did not suffer as a result of James's downfall, and Pierce had plenty of influential Protestant relatives to plead on his behalf. Presumably, they argued that the political beliefs, if any, of a small boy are not worth troubling about. In any case, his outlawry was reversed in 1698: Pierce was restored in his title and took his seat in the House of Lords in October 1698. Since a peer would not normally take his seat in the Lords until he came of age, this suggests that 1677 is the most likely year of his birth.

In order to take his seat, he was required to swear the Oath of Supremacy, recognising King William III of England as Head of the Church of Ireland: this suggests that Pierce, like his grandfather, conformed outwardly to the Anglican communion. According to the historian John Philipps Kenyon, many seventeenth-century English and Anglo-Irish Catholics believed that they could in good conscience swear the Oath of Allegiance to a Protestant monarch, but most of them would only swear the Oath of Supremacy under some form of duress.

== Military career ==
Like his father and his mother's father, he became a professional soldier. He was a Colonel of Foot from 1700 to 1705, and subsequently a Colonel of Dragoons. He appears to have been a skilled officer, and saw active service in Spain during the War of the Spanish Succession. He became Brigadier General shortly before his death.

He died in early January 1711 at Rathbarry Castle in County Cork, presumably while on a family visit, as the Freke family of Rathbarry Castle were his close relatives.

== Marriage and children ==
He married firstly the Honourable Alicia Boyle, daughter of Murrough Boyle, 1st Viscount Blesington, and his second wife Lady Anne Coote, daughter of the second Earl of Mountrath, by whom he had one son:

- James Butler, 5th Viscount Ikerrin.

He married secondly Olivia St. George, daughter of Sir Oliver St George, 1st Baronet, by his wife Olivia Thornton, and the widow of the prominent statesman Sir Robert Colville of Newtown House, Newtownards, but had no further issue. His widow, who made a third marriage to a Mr. Wroth of Epsom, Surrey, was buried at St James, Westminster, on 29 January 1723/4.

The 5th Viscount died young in 1711, and the title reverted to his uncle Thomas Butler, 6th Viscount Ikerrin. The next generation of Butlers gained the title Earl of Carrick, which they still hold.

== Sources ==
- Brewer, James Norris. History of Leinster, Taylor and Co. London 1829.
- Biographical Peerage of Ireland London 1817.
- Burke's Peerage, 107th edition, Delaware 2003.
- Childs, John. General Percy Kirke and the Later Stuart Army, Bloomsbury Publishing, London 2014.
- Grace, Sheffield; and Hall, Samuel Carter. Memoirs of the Family of Grace, vol. 1, London 1873.
- Hart, A. R. History of the King's Serjeant-at-law in Ireland, Dublin, Four Courts Press 2000.
- Kenyon, J. P. The Popish Plot, Phoenix Press reissue 2000.

Peerage of Ireland
Preceded by James Butler	Viscount Ikerrin (forfeit 1690–1698); 1688–1711	Succeeded by James Butler
