= Thomas Butler, 6th Viscount Ikerrin =

Irish nobleman

Thomas Butler, 6th Viscount Ikerrin (1683 – 7 March 1719) was an Irish nobleman.

He was born in Kilkenny, Ireland to James Butler, 3rd Viscount Ikerrin and Eleanor Redman, daughter of Colonel Daniel Redman, of Ballylinch, County Kilkenny and Abigail Otway. He was a descendant of John Butler of Clonamicklon. He was educated at Trinity College, Dublin. Thomas was a member of the clergy and Chaplain-General to the Army in Flanders. He married Margaret Hamilton, daughter and co-heiress of James Hamilton of Bangor, County Down and Sophia Mordaunt, daughter of John Mordaunt, 1st Viscount Mordaunt and Elizabeth Carey. His elder brother Pierce Butler, 4th Viscount Ikerrin, a Brigadier general in the Army, died in 1711, leaving an infant son, James, who succeeded as 5th Viscount but died young, whereupon Thomas succeeded to the title.

== Children ==
- James Butler, 7th Viscount Ikerrin (1714 – 20 October 1721), died at seven years of age
- Somerset Butler, 1st Earl of Carrick (6 September 1718 – 15 April 1774), also the 8th Viscount Ikerrin, married Lady Juliana Boyle and had issue.

== See also ==
- Butler dynasty

Peerage of Ireland
Preceded by James Butler	Viscount Ikerrin; 1712–1719	Succeeded by James Butler
