= Thomas Butler, 1st Baron Dunboyne =

Thomas Butler, 1st Baron Dunboyne (1271 – 9 October 1329) was the third son of Theobald Butler, 4th Chief Butler of Ireland and Joan FitzJohn.

== Marriage and Children ==
He married Synolda le Petit, daughter of William le Petit

- Piers Butler, 2nd Baron Dunboyne (1294-1370)

== Career ==
In 1324 he was called to the Irish Parliament (as were intermittently his descendants in the succeeding two centuries before the creation of the Barony of Dunboyne as a lordship of Parliament by patent 1541). He was created 1st Baron Dunboyne in 1324, by prescription. He fought in the Battle of Ardnocher on 9 October 1329 and was killed in action by the Chief of the Clan Geoghegan.

== See also ==
- Butler dynasty
- Baron Dunboyne

Peerage of Ireland
| New creation | Baron Dunboyne; 1324–1329 | Succeeded by Piers Butler |
