= Richard Butler, 1st Viscount Mountgarret =

Irish nobleman (1500–1571)

Richard Butler, 1st Viscount Mountgarret (1500 – 20 May 1571) was the son of Piers Butler, 8th Earl of Ormond and Lady Margaret Fitzgerald. He married his half first cousin Eleanor Butler, daughter of Theobald Butler of Polestown, the illegitimate brother of the 8th Earl of Ormond. He was created 1st Viscount Mountgarret in 1550.

== Career ==
Butler largely rebuilt the tower house at Mountgarret in County Wexford. He was described as a "Knight of goodly personage, and as comely a man as could be seen" and performed services to the Crown of England. As recompense, the Lords of the council, in their letter to the deputy lieutenant, St. Leger, dated at Windsor 5 August 1550, transmitted the directions of King Edward VI to create him, Viscount Mountgarret. This was done by patent, bearing date at Dublin 23 October.

In the reigns of Edward VI and Queen Mary I, he was keeper of the castle of Ferns. On 20 March 1558, he joined in a commission of martial law with Sir Nicholas Devereux for the territories of Fassaghbentry and LeMoroe's country. On 13 April 1559, he was in two several commissions "for the preservation of the peace in the counties of Kilkenny, Tipperary and Wexford", during the absence of the Deputy Lieutenant, Lord Sussex, in the north, upon his expedition against Shane O'Neill. On the following 12 January, he was present in the Parliament.

== Death ==
He died in 1571 and was buried alongside his ancestors in St. Canice's Cathedral, Kilkenny city.

== Marriage and children ==
His first wife was Eleanor, daughter of Theobald Butler of Nechum (or Polestown) in the county of Kilkenny, by whom he had Edmund, his successor.
His second marriage was to Catharine, daughter and heir to Peter Barnewall of Stackallan in Meath, and by her, he had a son Barnewall, who died unmarried.
His third marriage was in 1541 to Anne, daughter of John Plunket, Lord Killeen, from whom he was divorced in the first year of their marriage. They had five sons and four daughters, viz.

- Edmund Butler, 2nd Viscount Mountgarret (c.1562 - 1602), married Grania FitzPatrick and had children.
- Burnewall
- Pierce Butler, ancestor to the family of Carter, otherwise Clounegeragh,
- John, who left children.
- Thomas, who left children.
- Ellice or Cicely married to Walter Walsh of Castlehoel (Kilkenny).

By him, who died 9 May 1619, she had five sons,
- Robert, whose eldest son Walter, when eighteen years old, succeeded his grandfather;
- Edmund,
- James,
- William,
- John.

- Margaret, who married Sir Nicholas Devereux, the younger, of Ballymagin, Wexford, Knt. and had no children.
- Lady Eleanor Butler (Elinor), (d. a 1601), who first married Thomas Tobin of Cumpshinagh in Tipperary; secondly to Gerald Blanchville of Blanchvillestown, Kilkenny; and thirdly to Thomas (or possibly Edmund Butler), Lord Caher, son of Theobald Butler, 1st Baron Cahir. She died childless.
- Ellen, who was the first wife of Sir Oliver Shortall of Ballylarkan, Knt. by whom she had James Shortall, his successor there. Ellen Butler was later married to Lucas Shea, one of their posterity being Sir Thomas Hurley.

== See also ==
Butler dynasty

Peerage of Ireland
| New creation | Viscount Mountgarret; 1550–1571 | Succeeded by Edmund Butler |
