= James Butler, 1st Earl of Ormond =

Irish peer

James Butler, 1st Earl of Ormond (17 October 1304 – 6 January 1338), was a noble in the Peerage of Ireland. He was born in Arklow, Wicklow, Ireland and died in Gowran, Kilkenny, Ireland.

== Family ==
James Butler was the son of Edmund Butler, Earl of Carrick, (1268 – 13 September 1321), Justiciar of Ireland and Joan FitzGerald, Countess of Carrick. His paternal grandparents were Theobald le Botiller (1242–1285), (the son of Theobald le Botiller and Margery de Burgh) and Joan FitzJohn (FitzGeffrey) (d. 4 April 1303), who was the daughter of John FitzGeoffrey, Lord of Shere, Justiciar of Ireland and Isabel Bigod. His maternal grandfather was John FitzThomas FitzGerald, 1st Earl of Kildare, who married Blanche de la Roche.

== Titles ==
Upon his father's death in 1321, the only hereditary title to which James succeeded was that of Chief Butler of Ireland. As the 7th Chief Butler, he inherited the title from his ancestor Theobald Fitzwalter, or Theobald Butler, whose successors adopted the surname Butler. The hereditary office of butler of Ireland was one of particular fealty to the Crown, whereby Theobald and his successors were to attend the Kings of England at their coronation. A gap of seven years followed before James was rewarded for his especial loyalty with an earldom in his own right. His benefactor, the young King Edward III, created him the first Earl of Ormond by patent dated 2 November 1328, at Salisbury—the king was holding a Parliament there—with the creation fee of £10 a year. Seven days later by patent dated at Wallingford, in consideration of his services and the better to enable him to support the honour, the king gave James the regalities, liberties, knights fees, and other royal privileges of the county of Tipperary, and the rights of a palatine in that county for life.

At about the same time, in September 1328, the king created Roger Mortimer the 1st Earl of March, who would soon arouse the anger of those most loyal to the Crown.

In 1336, James founded the friary of Carrick-Begg (a townland on the River Suir opposite Carrick-on-Suir) for Franciscan Friars. On 3 June of that year, he gave the friars his castle and estate of Carrick, which they occupied on the feast day of SS. Peter and Paul (29 June).

== Marriage and children ==
In 1327, James was offered a marriage arrangement that would give him the castle and manor of Kilpec, Hereford, for life. He married Eleanor de Bohun (1304–1363), daughter of the 4th Earl of Hereford, and Princess Elizabeth, daughter of King Edward I of England; they had six children together, four of whom survived infancy:

- Anne Butler (1328–1329)
- Eleanor Butler (?)
- John Butler (born and died an infant in 1330)
- Elizabeth Butler (1330)
- James Butler, 2nd Earl of Ormond (4 October 1331 – 18 October 1382), married Elizabeth Darcy, daughter of John Darcy, 1st Baron Darcy de Knayth, Lord Justice of Ireland, and Joan de Burgh, and had issue. He was born at Kilkenny and given in ward on 1 September 1344—his father, James Butler, had died in 1338—to Maurice, Earl of Desmond, for the fine of 2,306 marks; and afterwards to Sir John Darcy, who married him to his daughter Elizabeth. James Butler the son was called the Noble Earl on account of his descent from the Royal Family through his mother.
- Pernel Butler (1332 – 23 April 1368), married Gilbert Talbot, 3rd Baron Talbot, son of Richard Talbot, 2nd Baron Talbot and Elizabeth de Comyn, and had issue. They were ancestors to Lady Maud Parr, mother of queen consort Catherine Parr.

James's successors held the title Earl of Ormond, which was later merged with the higher title of Duke of Ormonde; they held palatine rights in County Tipperary until the County Palatine of Tipperary Act 1715.

== See also ==
- Barony of Iffa and Offa East
- Butler dynasty

Peerage of Ireland
New creation	Earl of Ormond; 1328–1337	Succeeded by James Butler
