= Richard Butler, 5th Viscount Mountgarret =

Irish soldier and politician (died 1707)

Richard Butler
- 5th Viscount Mountgarret

5th Viscount Mountgarret
- Reign: 1679–1707
- Predecessor: Edmund Butler, 4th Viscount Mountgarret
- Successor: Edmund Butler, 6th Viscount Mountgarret
- Died: 27 February 1707
- Noble family: Butler
- Spouse: Emily Blundell (m. 1661)
- Issue: Edmund Butler, 6th Viscount Mountgarret
- Father: Edmund Butler, 4th Viscount Mountgarret
- Mother: Lady Dorothy Tuchet

Richard Butler, 5th Viscount Mountgarret (died 27 February 1707) was an Irish soldier and politician.

== Biography ==
Butler was the son of Edmund Butler, 4th Viscount Mountgarret and Lady Dorothy Tuchet, daughter of Mervyn Tuchet, 2nd Earl of Castlehaven.

He was a captain in the French Royal Army. A devout Roman Catholic, he was imprisoned for his faith in Liverpool in 1658 under The Protectorate. On 5 April 1679 he succeeded to his father's peerage. In 1689, he was summoned to the Irish House of Lords by James II of England in the brief Patriot Parliament. He raised a regiment, of which he was colonel, in support of James II in the Williamite War in Ireland.

Despite his support for the Jacobites, he was not targeted by Williamite reprisals. He refused to take the Oath of Supremacy when attending the Irish House of Lords in 1692, but in 1697 he secured a reversal of the outlawry passed against his grandfather, Richard Butler.

He married, firstly, Emily Blundell, daughter of William Blundell and Anne Haggerston, in September 1661. Together they had three sons, including Butler's heir, Edmund. He married, secondly, Margaret Shee, daughter of Richard Shee, after 1682.

Peerage of Ireland
Preceded by Edmund Butler	Viscount Mountgarret; 1679–1707	Succeeded by Edmund Butler
