= Somerset Butler, 1st Earl of Carrick =

Irish peer

Somerset Hamilton Butler, 1st Earl of Carrick, PC (6 September 1718 – 15 April 1774), known as the Viscount Ikerrin from 1721 to 1744, was the son of Thomas Butler, 6th Viscount Ikerrin and Margaret Hamilton, daughter and co-heiress of James Hamilton of Bangor, County Down and Sophie Mordaunt. He succeeded his brother James Butler as the 8th Viscount Ikerrin on 20 October 1721. Subsequently, he was invested as a Privy Council of Ireland on 14 April 1746. He was awarded an LL.D. honorary degree by Dublin University on 23 February 1747. He was created Earl of Carrick (second creation) on 10 June 1748. The name "Carrick" refers to the town of Carrick-on-Suir in County Tipperary. It was also the title of his remote ancestor, Edmund Butler, Earl of Carrick (of the first creation).

== Marriage and Children ==
On 18 May 1745, he married Lady Juliana Boyle, daughter of Henry Boyle, 1st Earl of Shannon and Lady Henrietta Boyle. They had five children.

1. Henry Butler, 2nd Earl of Carrick (19 May 1746 – 20 July 1813), married Sarah Taylor.
2. Hon. James Butler (5 August 1747 – December 1747)
3. Lady Margaret Butler (23 January 1748 – April 1775), married Armar Lowry-Corry, 1st Earl Belmore.
4. Lady Henrietta Butler (15 August 1750 – 20 June 1785), married Edmund Butler, 11th Viscount Mountgarret.
5. Hon. Pierce Butler-Cooper (15 August 1750 – 5 May 1826), married Catherine Roth, daughter of Richard Roth, Esq.

== See also ==
- Butler dynasty

Peerage of Ireland
New creation	Earl of Carrick; 1748–1774	Succeeded by Henry Butler
Preceded by James Butler	Viscount Ikerrin; 1721–1774	Succeeded by Henry Butler
