= Edward Butler, 2nd Viscount Galmoye =

Edward Butler, 2nd Viscount Galmoye (c. 1627– after 24 October 1667) was the son of Piers Butler of Duiske and Margaret Netterville, daughter of Nicholas Netterville, 1st Viscount Netterville. His grandfather was Edward Butler, 1st Viscount Galmoye.

Butler succeeded to the title of Viscount Galmoye, in county Kilkenny in 1653 following the death of his grandfather, his father having predeceased him in 1650. He had a younger brother, Major Edmond Butler of Killoshulan.

== Marriage and issue ==
He married Eleanor White, daughter of Sir Nicholas White of Leixlip. They had two sons:

- Piers Butler, 3rd Viscount Galmoye.
- Richard Butler of Galmoye, whose son and heir was James Butler of the Irish Brigade in France.

== See also ==
- Butler dynasty

Peerage of Ireland
Preceded by Edward Butler	Viscount Galmoye; 1653–1667	Succeeded by Piers Butler
