= Henry Butler, 2nd Earl of Carrick =

Irish peer and politician

Henry Thomas Butler, 2nd Earl of Carrick (19 May 1746 – 20 July 1813), styled The Honourable from birth to 1748 and then as Viscount Ikerrin between 1748 and 1774, was an Irish peer and politician.

He was the son of Somerset Butler, 1st Earl of Carrick and Lady Juliana Boyle. Butler held the office of Member of Parliament for Killyleagh in the Parliament of Ireland between 1768 and 1774. He succeeded to the title of 2nd Earl of Carrick on 15 April 1774. He died in 1813 at Mount Juliet, County Kilkenny, Ireland.

On 7 August 1774, he married Sarah Taylor, daughter of Colonel Edward Taylor and Anne Maunsell.

- Lady Sarah Butler (31 July 1787 - 7 July 1838) m. 1812 Charles Wandesforde (1780 - 1860)
- Lady Anne Butler (died 29 May 1831)
- Somerset Richard Butler, 3rd Earl of Carrick (28 September 1779 – 4 February 1838)
- Hon. Henry Edward Butler (3 December 1780 – 7 December 1856)
- Lady Juliana Butler (20 September 1783 – 22 July 1861) who married her cousin Somerset Lowry-Corry, 2nd Earl Belmore, and had issue.

Parliament of Ireland
Preceded by John Blackwood; John Congreve	Member of Parliament for Killyleagh; 1768–1774; With: Sir Archibald Acheson, 6th Bt 1768–1769; Arthur Johnston 1769–1774	Succeeded by Hon. Pierce Butler; Arthur Johnston
Peerage of Ireland
Preceded by Somerset Hamilton Butler	Earl of Carrick; 1774–1813	Succeeded by Somerset Richard Butler
