= Piers Butler, 3rd Viscount Galmoye =

Anglo-Irish noble

Piers Butler, 3rd Viscount Galmoye, otherwise Viscount Galmoy (21 March 1652 – 18 June 1740), was an Anglo-Irish nobleman. He was descended from the 10th Earl of Ormond. He was the son of Edward Butler, 2nd Viscount Galmoye, and Eleanor White.

== Marriage and issue ==
He married Anne Mathew and with her had one son, Colonel Edward Butler, who was killed at the Battle of Malplaquet in 1709. After the death of his first wife, he married Henrietta FitzJames, the illegitimate daughter of King James II and Arabella Churchill, on 3 April 1695. She was the widow of Henry Waldegrave, 1st Baron Waldegrave.

== Life and career ==
In 1677, Lord Galmoye took the degree of LL.D. at Oxford. Under James II of England he was Privy Councillor of Ireland, Lieutenant of the County of Kilkenny, and Colonel of the 2nd Regiment of Irish Horse. Serving as part of the Jacobite Irish Army, he commanded a regiment at the Boyne and served with distinction at Aughrim. He was one of the signers of the Treaty of Limerick. At the Glorious Revolution, he might probably have secured his old estates of 10,000 acres (40 km^{2}) in Kilkenny and 5,000 in Wexford, if he had consented to give his allegiance to William III of England instead of following Sarsfield and James II into exile in France. Instead, the English Parliament attainted him and declared his titles forfeit in 1697 by the statute 9 Will. 3. c. 4.

In 1692 he was created Earl of Newcastle in County Limerick in the Jacobite peerage of Ireland. In France he was named Colonel of the 2nd Queen's Regiment of Irish Horse in the service of that country, and served with distinction in various battles of the War of the Spanish Succession, also becoming a Lieutenant-General in the Spanish army. He was at the siege of Roses in 1693, and in 1694 was a Brigadier attached to the army of Germany. He served in Italy and other parts of the Continent from 1701 to 1703, sharing all the fortunes of the Irish Brigade.

He later served in the French army as a Lieutenant-General. He was created Brigadier of Cavalry in 1694. Lord Galmoy (as he spelt his name) died in Paris on 18 June 1740 and was buried at St Paul's there. O'Callaghan says: "The successive claimants of the title of Galmoy were officers in France down to the Revolution; in whose armies, as well as in others, various gentlemen have honourably represented a name, of which the illustrious General Lafayette is related to have said, in the war for the independence of the United States of America, that 'whenever he wanted anything well done, he got a Butler to do it.'"

Notwithstanding the attainder, the viscountcy was assumed by his nephew, James Butler of the Irish Brigade in France, the son of the Viscount's brother, Richard Butler of Galmoye.

== See also ==
- Butler dynasty

== Notes ==
Peerage of Ireland
New creation	— TITULAR — Earl of Newcastle; Jacobite peerage 1692–1740	Extinct
Preceded by Edward Butler	Viscount Galmoye; 1667–1697	Forfeit
