= Edmund Butler, 4th Viscount Mountgarret =

Edmund Butler, 4th Viscount Mountgarret (1595–1679) was the son of Richard Butler, 3rd Viscount Mountgarret. He acceded to his title on the death of his father in 1651 and retained his lands in the north and east of Kilkenny while many others whose families had been involved in the Catholic Confederacy lost theirs. His father had been heavily involved in the rebellion but Edmund received a pardon for all treasons and rebellions from King Charles II and was restored to his estates.

== Marriage and family ==
He married three times. His first wife was Lady Dorothy Touchet, whom he married around 1630. She is believed to have died in February 1635. Subsequent marriages to Anne Trensham (1635) and Elizabeth Simeon (c. 1606-1674) in 1637 followed in quick succession. He died in 1679 at the age of 84. He was succeeded by his son, Richard Butler, 5th Viscount Mountgarret.

== See also ==
- Butler dynasty

Peerage of Ireland
| Preceded by Richard Butler | Viscount Mountgarret; 1651–1679 | Succeeded by Richard Butler |
