= Joan Butler, Countess of Carrick =

Irish noblewoman (1281–1320)

Joan FitzGerald
- Countess of Carrick
- Born: c. 1281; Fermoy, County Cork, Ireland
- Died: 2 May 1320; Laraghbryan, County Kildare, Ireland
- Noble family: FitzGerald
- Spouse: Edmund Butler, Earl of Carrick
- Issue: James Butler, 1st Earl of Ormond; John Butler
- Father: John FitzThomas FitzGerald, 1st Earl of Kildare, Baron of Offaly
- Mother: Blanche de La Roche

Joan Butler (née FitzGerald), Countess of Carrick (1281 – 2 May 1320) was an Irish noblewoman, and the wife of Edmund Butler, Earl of Carrick, Justiciar of Ireland (1268 – 13 September 1321). She was the mother of James Butler, 1st Earl of Ormond.

== Family ==
Joan FitzGerald was born in Fermoy, County Cork, Ireland, in 1281, the daughter of John FitzThomas FitzGerald, 1st Earl of Kildare, Baron of Offaly, and Blanche de La Roche. She had two brothers, Gerald (died 1303), and Thomas FitzGerald, 2nd Earl of Kildare (died 5 April 1328), who married Joan de Burgh (c. 1300 – 23 April 1359), daughter of Richard Óg de Burgh, 2nd Earl of Ulster and Margaret de Burgh of Lanvalley, by whom he had issue. Joan had one sister, Elizabeth, who married Nicholas Netterville, by whom she had issue.

Joan FitzGerald's paternal grandparents were Thomas FitzMaurice FitzGerald and Rohesia de St. Michael, and her maternal grandparents were John de La Roche, Lord of Fermoy, and Maud de Waleys (Walsh). The latter was a daughter of Henry le Walleis, Mayor of London.

== Marriage and issue ==
In 1302, Joan married Sir Edmund Butler, Earl of Carrick, the son of Theobald le Botiller (1242–1285) and Joan FitzJohn (FitzGeoffrey) (died 4 April 1303). The marriage produced two sons:

- James Butler, 1st Earl of Ormond (1305 – 6 January 1338), who married Lady Eleanor de Bohun (17 October 1304 – 7 October 1363), by whom he had four children, including James Butler, 2nd Earl of Ormond who in his turn married Elizabeth Darcy and had issue, from whom descended the subsequent Earls of Ormond.
- John Butler of Clonamicklon

In 1307, Sir Edmund and Joan's father dispersed rebels in Offaly who had burnt the town of Leix and destroyed the castle of Geashill.

In 1315, Sir Edmund Butler was appointed Justiciar of Ireland.

That same year, in July, Joan's husband and her father led the Munster and Leinster contingent of armed forces who were allied with the combined armies of Richard de Burgh, 2nd Earl of Ulster and Felim mac Aedh Ua Conchobair, King of Connacht against the Scottish and Irish troops of Edward Bruce who had been crowned King Of Ireland at Carrickfergus. They were repelled by Bruce, at the River Bann near Coleraine and forced to retreat. Sir Edmund, due to lack of supplies, returned to Ormond.

Edward Bruce was later killed in 1318, at the Battle of Faughart.

On 1 September 1315, for services against the Scottish raiders and Ulster rebels, Edmund Butler was granted a charter of the castle and manor of Karryk Macgryffin and Roscrea to hold to him and his heirs sub nomine et honore comitis de Karryk. However, the charter, while creating an Earldom, failed to make Edmund Butler's issue Earls of Carrick.

Joan's father, John FitzThomas FitzGerald, died a year later on 10 September 1316, several months after being created Earl of Kildare by King Edward II.

== Death ==
Joan FitzGerald died on 2 May 1320 in Laraghbryan, County Kildare. She was the ancestress of the earls of Ormond, the queen consort Anne Boleyn and Diana, Princess of Wales.
