= Richard Butler, 3rd Viscount Mountgarret =

Richard Butler, 3rd Viscount Mountgarret (1578–1651) was the son of Edmund Butler, 2nd Viscount Mountgarret and Grany (Grainne) or Grizzel, daughter of Barnaby Fitzpatrick, 1st Baron Upper Ossory. He is best known for his participation in the Irish Confederate Wars on behalf of the Irish Confederate Catholics.

== Family ==
His sister, Helen Butler, married her second cousin, Walter Butler, 11th Earl of Ormond. Later, he was to clash politically with his grand-nephew James, the 12th Earl. His first wife was Margaret, eldest daughter of Hugh O'Neill, Earl of Tyrone, who was the most powerful Roman Catholic noble in the country at the time. He especially distinguished himself by his defence of the castles of Ballyragget and Cullihill. His estates were nevertheless confirmed to him on the death of his father in 1605, and he sat in the parliaments of 1613, 1615, and 1634.

His younger brother was John Butler.

== Marriage and Children ==
By his first wife, Margaret, eldest daughter of Hugh O'Neill, Earl of Tyrone, he had three sons and six daughters, of whom

- Edmund Butler, 4th Viscount Mountgarret
- Elizabeth married another member of the Butler line, Sir Walter Butler, 1st Baronet Polestown
- Margaret married Richard Bellings

The Viscount was again twice married: to Thomasine (afterwards named Elizabeth), daughter of Sir William Andrews of Newport, and to Margaret, daughter of Richard Branthwaite, serjeant-at-law, and widow of Sir Thomas Spencer of Yarnton, Oxfordshire, but he no issue by either of these marriages.

His third wife, Margaret, had lent £10 to the playwright Elizabeth Cary, Viscountess Falkland in 1627.

== Rebellion ==
In 1641 he placed himself in opposition to his powerful Anglican cousin - James, Earl (later the Duke) of Ormonde. At the commencement of hostilities in the Irish Rebellion of 1641, he appeared inclined to espouse the Government side, and was appointed joint Governor of Kilkenny with the earl. Fearing, however, that the rights and liberties of his Catholic brethren would be still further interfered with, he wrote an explanatory letter to the Earl and took possession of Kilkenny in the name of the Confederates. He endeavoured to protect the lives and property of the Protestants, without relaxing his efforts for the side he had espoused. He then detached parties to secure other adjacent towns, which was done with such success that in the space of a week all the fortresses in the counties of Kilkenny, Waterford, and Tipperary were in their power.

After this he was chosen general of the Catholic Confederation which the rebels had formed to coordinate their war effort; but the county of Cork had insisted on choosing a general of its own. Thus were lost the advantages of undivided and vigorous control of the Confederate armies. The Viscount's forces were thereby considerably weakened, and he was defeated by the Earl of Ormonde at the Battle of Kilrush, near Athy, on 10 April 1642. Returning to Kilkenny, he was chosen president of the Supreme Council (the Confederate Government) formed there in the following summer.

In 1643 he was at the Battle of New Ross, fought by General Preston against the Marquis of Ormonde. He was also at the capture, with his son Edmund (Roe), of the Castle of Borris, in Queen's County (Laois) in 1643. He was with the Lords Netterville, Ikerrin, Upper Ossory, and Castlehaven at the siege of Ballinakill, which surrendered on 5 May.

== Outlawry 1652 and restoration in 1662 ==
Mountgarret was outlawed by Cromwell, and excepted from pardon for life or estate. His son-in-law Sir Walter Butler, 1st Baronet of Polestown, was a supporter of the Government cause and was made Governor of Kilkenny in 1650. The Viscount died in 1651, and was interred in St. Canice's, Kilkenny. Although he was dead before it passed, he was excepted from pardon for life or estate by the crown in the Act of Settlement 1652 passed on 12 Aug. 1652, because of his participation in the rebellion of 1641. His son Edmund had the family estates restored following the Act of Settlement 1662.

== See also ==
- Butler dynasty

Peerage of Ireland
Preceded by Edmund Butler	Viscount Mountgarret; 1602–1651	Succeeded by Edmund Butler
