= Edward Butler, 1st Viscount Galmoye =

Sir Edward Butler, 1st Viscount Galmoye (died 1653) was an Irish peer, the eldest son of Piers FitzThomas Butler and the Honourable Katherine Fleming, daughter and co-heiress of Thomas Fleming, 10th Baron Slane and his wife Catherine Preston. His father was the illegitimate son of Thomas Butler, 10th Earl of Ormond. He was educated at Trinity College, Dublin. Edward Butler was invested as a Knight on 1 November 1619. He held the office of High Sheriff of County Kilkenny, Ireland in 1640. In 1646 he attended the Confederation of Kilkenny. He was created 1st Viscount Galmoye on 16 May 1646. He lived at Galmoy Castle, County Kilkenny. He died in 1653 and was succeeded by his grandson, Edward Butler.

== Marriage and issue ==
The Viscount married the Honourable Anne Butler, daughter of Edmund Butler, 2nd Viscount Mountgarret, a distant cousin, and his wife Grania Fitzpatrick.

They had two sons:

- Piers Butler of Duiske, Barrowmount, County Kilkenny who married Margaret Netterville. He was taken prisoner and killed by the Cromwellian Captain Bolton in 1650, reportedly "after quarter had been given". He left numerous offspring including the 2nd Viscount.
- Thomas Butler

== See also ==
- Butler dynasty

Peerage of Ireland
New creation	Viscount Galmoye; 1646–1653	Succeeded by Edward Butler
