= Somerset Butler, 3rd Earl of Carrick =

Somerset Richard Butler, 3rd Earl of Carrick (28 September 1779 – 4 February 1838) was the son of Henry Thomas Butler, 2nd Earl of Carrick and Sarah Taylor. He succeeded to the title of 3rd Earl of Carrick and 10th Viscount Ikerrin upon his father's death on 20 July 1813. He was married twice, first on 1 September 1811 to Anne Wynne, daughter of Owen Wynne and Lady Sarah Cole. They had two children. He married secondly on 12 February 1833 Lucy French, third daughter of Arthur French, Esquire. They had three children.

Lord Carrick served as an Irish representative peer from 1819 to 1838.

== Children ==
Anne Wynne

- Lady Anne Margaret Butler (Oct.22,1829; died 15 May 1901) married George Whitelocke Whitelocke-Lloyd
- Lady Sarah Juliana Butler (29 July 1812 – 28 April 1905) married William Thomas Le Poer Trench, 3rd Earl of Clancarty

Lucy French

- Lady Lucy Maria Butler (died 25 July 1896) married John Massy, 6th Baron Massy
- Henry Thomas Butler, 4th Earl of Carrick died at age 12 (19 February 1834 – 16 April 1846 Cheam, Surrey, England, bur. 21 April 1846 Cheam St Dunstan)
- Somerset Arthur Butler, 5th Earl of Carrick (30 January 1835 – 22 December 1901)

Peerage of Ireland
Preceded by Henry Butler	Earl of Carrick; 1813–1838	Succeeded by Henry Thomas Butler
Political offices
Preceded by The Viscount Northland	Representative peer for Ireland; 1819–1838	Succeeded by The Earl of Charleville
