= Edmund Butler, 2nd Viscount Mountgarret =

Irish noble

Edmund Butler, 2nd Viscount Mountgarret (c. 1562 – 1602), was the son of Richard Butler, 1st Viscount Mountgarret and Eleanor Butler.

== Marriage and children ==
He married Grany, Grania, or Grizzel FitzPatrick, daughter of Barnaby Fitzpatrick, 1st Baron Upper Ossory.

Among their children were:

- Richard Butler, 3rd Viscount Mountgarret (1578 - 1651)
- Helen Butler (d. 1631), who married her second cousin, Walter Butler, 11th Earl of Ormond
- Anne Butler, who married Edward Butler, 1st Viscount Galmoye
- Margaret Butler, who married Oliver Grace of Carney, County Tipperary

His sister Eleanor married Thomas Butler, 4th Baron Cahir.

== See also ==
Butler dynasty

== Bibliography ==
- Burke, Sir Bernard (1914). A Genealogical and Heraldic History of the Peerage and Baronetage, the Privy Council, Knightage and Companionage. London: Harrison and Sons.
- Burke, Sir Bernard (1866). A Genealogical History of the Dormant, Abeyant, Forfeited and Extinct Peerages of the British Empire. London: Harrison and Sons.
- Burke, John (1832). A General and Heraldic Dictionary of the Peerage and Baronetage of the British Empire, Volume 2. London: H. Colburn and R. Bentley.
- Carrigan, William (1905). The History and Antiquities of the Diocese of Ossory, Volume 2. Dublin: Sealy, Bryers & Walker.

Peerage of Ireland
Preceded by Richard Butler	Viscount Mountgarret; 20 May 1571 – 24 Nov 1602	Succeeded by Richard Butler
