= John Butler of Clonamicklon =

John Butler of Clonamicklon (or of Lismalin), (1305 – 6 January 1330) was born in Arklow, Wicklow, Ireland the youngest son of Edmund Butler, Earl of Carrick and Joan FitzGerald. Once older he moved north from Lismalin and established a junior branch of the family in the Slieveardagh Hills at Clonamicklon, County Tipperary.

== Lands ==
Lismalin (also known as Lismolin) is a townland in the civil parish of the same name. The largest town in the parish is Mullinahone. Immediately to the north lies the civil parish of Ballingarry and immediately to the north of Ballingarry lies the civil parish of Buolick in which the townland of Clonamicklon is located. The largest town in the parish is Gortnahoe. The townland of Clonamicklon borders the civil parish of Kilcooly to the east. In the townland of Kilcoolyabbey lies Kilcooly Abbey, close to the border with County Kilkenny. Donagh Carbragh O'Brien, King of Thomond, founded the abbey for Cistercian monks about 1200. John Butler was buried in the abbey. Following the Dissolution of the Monasteries during the English Reformation, the lands were granted to the Earl of Ormond. The lands of this family stretched some fifteen miles between Lismalin on the King’s River to Kilcooly. All four civil parishes lie in the barony of Slievardagh.

== Marriage and children ==
By his wife Johanna, they had one child together

- Edmund of Lismalin (1325-1372) who married and had one son

== See also ==
- Butler dynasty
