= Viscount Butler of Tulleophelim =

Irish title

Viscount Butler of Tulleophelim, in the County of Carlow, was a title in the Peerage of Ireland. It was created on 4 August 1603 for Theobald Butler, the son of Sir Edmund Butler of Cloughgrenan, second son of James Butler, 9th Earl of Ormond (see Earl of Ormonde for earlier history of the family). He later served as Lord Lieutenant of Carlow. The title became extinct on his death in 1613. Tulleophelim (or Tullowphelim) is a civil parish located in County Carlow. The parish contains the town of Tullow. The name is contracted from Tullow-offelimy, (the Irish: tulach) or hill of the territory of the Hy Felimy, a tribe descended and named from Felimy, son of Enna Kinsella, Kings of Leinster in the fourth century.

== Viscount Butler of Tulleophelim (1605) ==
- Theobald Butler, 1st Viscount Butler of Tulleophelim (c. 1560–1613)

== Family tree ==
Butler dynasty family tree including the Earls of Carrick and Irish Earls of Ormond

Theobald Walter; 1165–1206; 1st Chief Butler of Ireland
Theobald le Botiller; 1201–1230; 2nd Chief Butler of Ireland
Theobald Butler; 1224–1248; 3rd Chief Butler of Ireland
King Edward I 1239–1307	Theobald Butler; 1242–1285; 4th Chief Butler of Ireland
Earl of Carrick (1st creation), 1315	Baron Dunboyne (by prescription), 1324
Elizabeth of Rhuddlan; 1282–1316	Theobald Butler; 1269–1299; 5th Chief Butler of Ireland	Edmund Butler; 1268–1321; Earl of Carrick	Thomas Butler; 1271–1329; 1st Baron Dunboyne
Earldom of Carrick (1st creation) extinct, 1321
Earl of Ormond (1st creation), 1328)
Eleanor de Bohun; 1304–1363	James Butler; 1304–1338; 1st Earl of Ormonde	John Butler of Clonamicklon; 1305–1330	Piers Butler; 1294–1370; 2nd Baron Dunboyne
James Butler; 1331–1382; 2nd Earl of Ormonde	Edmund of Lismalin; 1325-1372	Thomas Butler; 1345–1370; 3rd Baron Dunboyne	William Butler; 1355–1406; 4th Baron Dunboyne
James Butler c. 1359–1405; 3rd Earl of Ormonde	James Butler of Lismalin; 1361–1405	William Butler d. 1415; 5th Baron Dunboyne	William Butler d. 1419; 6th Baron Dunboyne	William Butler d. 1445; 7th Baron Dunboyne
James Butler; 1393–1452; 4th Earl of Ormonde	Richard Butler of Polestown; 1395–1443	James "Gallda" Butler	James Butler; 1400–1434	Edmond Butler d. 1498; 8th Baron Dunboyne
James Butler; 1420–1461; 5th Earl of Ormonde	John Butler d. 1476; 6th Earl of Ormonde	John Butler; 1426–1515; 7th Earl of Ormonde	Edmund MacRichard Butler of Polestown; 1420–1464	Pierce Butler; 1425–1526	James Butler d. 1508; 9th Baron Dunboyne
Margaret Butler c. 1454 – 1539	James Butler of Polestown d. 1487	Walter Butler of Polestown fl. 1483	James Butler; 1473–1538	James Butler d. 1538; 10th Baron Dunboyne
Earl of Ormond (2nd creation), 1529	Earl of Ossory, 1528	Baron Dunboyne (by patent), 1541
Thomas Boleyn c. 1477–1539; Earl of Ormond, Earl of Wiltshire	Piers Butler c. 1467–1539; 8th Earl of Ormond, 1st Earl of Ossory	Theobald Butler of Polestown	Piers Butler; 1521–1578	Edmond Butler d. 1566; 1st/11th Baron Dunboyne
Earldom of Ormonde (2nd creation) extinct, 1539	Earldom of Ormonde (1st creation) resigned, 1528 and restored, 1538
Viscount Thurles, 1536	Viscount Mountgarret, 1550
King Henry VIII; 1491–1547	Anne Boleyn c. 1501 or c. 1507 – 1536	James Butler; 1496–1546; 9th Earl of Ormond, 2nd Earl of Ossory, 1st Viscount Thurles	Richard Butler; 1500–1571; 1st Viscount Mountgarret	Eleanor Butler	Edmond Butler of Polestown	James Butler d. 1601	James Butler d. 1624; 2nd/12th Baron Dunboyne
Thomas Butler; 1531–1614; 10th Earl of Ormond, 3rd Earl of Ossory, 2nd Viscount Thurles	Edmund Butler of Cloughgrenan; 1534 – c. 1585	John Butler of Kilcash d. 1570	Edmund Butler c. 1562 – 1602; 2nd Viscount Mountgarret	John Butler d. 1602	Piers Butler d. 1626	Edward Butler
Viscount Butler of Tulleophelim, 1603
Piers FitzThomas Butler b. 1554	Theobald Butler d. 1613; Viscount Butler of Tulleophelim	Walter Butler; 1559–1633; 11th Earl of Ormond, 4th Earl of Ossory, 3rd Viscount Thurles	Helen Butler d. 1631	Richard Butler; 1578–1651; 3rd Viscount Mountgarret	Peter Butler of Roscrea	Richard Butler of Polestown d. 1619	Edmund Butler d. 1641
Viscountcy Butler of Tulleophelim extinct, 1613
Viscount Galmoye, 1646	Lord Dingwall, 1609	Viscount Ikerrin, 1629
Edward Butler d. 1653; 1st Viscount Galmoye	Elizabeth Butler c. 1585 – 1628	Richard Preston d. 1628; Earl of Desmond, 1st Lord Dingwall	Thomas Butler a. 1596 – 1619 styled Viscount Thurles	Edmund Butler; 1595–1679; 4th Viscount Mountgarret	Walter Butler of Roscrea; 1600–1634	Edmond Butler of Polestown; 1595–1636	Pierce Butler; 1587–1661; 1st Viscount Ikerrin	Edmond Butler; 1595–1640; 3rd/13th Baron Dunboyne
Marquess of Ormonde (1st creation), 1642; Duke of Ormonde (Ireland), 1661; Duke of Ormonde (England), 1682	Baronet of Polestown, 1645
Piers Butler of Duiske d. 1650	Elizabeth Preston; 1615–1684; 2nd Baroness Dingwall, suo jure	James FitzThomas Butler; 1610–1688; 1st Duke of Ormond, etc., 12th Earl of Ormond, 5th Earl of Ossory, 4th Viscount Thurles	Richard Butler of Kilcash; 1615–1701	Walter Butler d. 1650; 1st Baronet of Polestown	James Butler c. 1616 – 1638	James Butler d. 1662; 4th/14th Baron Dunboyne	Pierce Butler d. 1690; 5th/15th Baron Dunboyne	James Butler
Earl of Arran (1st Irish creation), Viscount Tullogh (1st creation), Baron Butler of Cloughgrennan (1st creation), 1662
Baron Butler of Moore Park, 1666	Baron Butler of Weston (1st creation), 1673	Earl of Gowran, 1676
Edward Butler c. 1627 – after 1667; 2nd Viscount Galmoye	Thomas Butler; 1634–1680; 13th Earl of Ormond, 6th Earl of Ossory, 5th Viscount Thurles, 1st Baron Butler	Richard Butler; 1639–1686; Earl of Arran, etc.	John Butler; 1643–1677; 1st Earl of Gowran	Richard Butler a. 1661 – 1707; 5th Viscount Mountgarret	Richard Butler d. c. 1679; 2nd Baronet of Polestown	Pierce Butler; 1637–1680; 2nd Viscount Ikerrin	James Butler d. 1701; 6th/16th Baron Dunboyne
Earldom of Arran (1st Irish creation) and subsidiary titles extinct, 1686	Earldom of Gowran extinct, 1677
Earl of Arran (2nd Irish creation), Viscount Tullogh (2nd creation), Baron Butler of Cloughgrennan (2nd creation), 1693; Baron Butler of Weston (2nd creation), 1694; Duke of Arran (Jacobite), 1722
Piers Butler; 1652–1740; Earl of Newcastle, 3rd Viscount Galmoye	James FitzThomas Butler; 1665–1745; 2nd Duke of Ormond, etc., 14th Earl of Ormond, 7th Earl of Ossory, 6th Viscount Thurles, 3rd Lord Dingwall, 2nd Baron Butler	Charles Butler; 1671–1758; 3rd Duke of Ormond, de jure, Earl of Arran, etc.	Walter Butler of Garryricken d. 1700	Edmund Butler; 1663–1735; 6th Viscount Mountgarret	James Butler d. 1688; 3rd Viscount Ikerrin	Edward Butler
Viscountcy Galmoye extinct, 1697	Dukedom of Ormonde (England) forfeit by attainder, 1715, but Irish dukedom continued	Dukedom of Arran (Jacobite), dukedom of Ormonde (Ireland), earldom of Arran, and subsidiary titles, and barony Butler extinct, 1758
Thomas Butler of Garryricken d. 1738	John Butler of Garryricken d. 1738	Richard Butler; 1685–1736; 7th Viscount Mountgarret	James Butler; 1686–1749; 8th Viscount Mountgarret	Edmund Butler; 1687–1751; 9th Viscount Mountgarret	Walter Butler c. 1678 – 1723; 3rd Baronet of Polestown	Pierce Butler; 1679–1711; 4th Viscount Ikerrin	Thomas Butler; 1683–1719; 6th Viscount Ikerrin	Pierce Butler d. 1718; 7th/17th Baron Dunboyne	Edmund Butler d. 1732; 8th/18th Baron Dunboyne
Earls of Carrick (2nd creation), 1748
John Butler of Kilcash and Garryricken c. 1720 – 1766; 15th Earl of Ormond, 8th Earl of Ossory de jure, 7th Viscount Thurles	Walter Butler of Kilcash and Garryricken; 1703–1783; 16th Earl of Ormond, 9th Earl of Ossory de jure, 8th Viscount Thurles	Edmund Butler d. 1779; 10th Viscount Mountgarret	Edmund Butler c. 1708 – 1762; 4th Baronet of Polestown	James Butler d. 1711; 5th Viscount Ikerrin	James Butler; 1714–1721; 7th Viscount Ikerrin	Somerset Butler; 1718–1774; 1st Earl of Carrick, 8th Viscount Ikerrin	Michael Butler d. 1776
Baronetcy Butler of Polestown extinct, 1762
Earldoms of Ormond and Ossory acknowledged, 1791
John Butler; 1740–1795; 17th Earl of Ormond, 10th Earl of Ossory, 9th Viscount Thurles	Edmund Butler; 1745–1793; 11th Viscount Mountgarret	Henry Butler; 1746–1813; 2nd Earl of Carrick, 9th Viscount Ikerrin	James Butler d. 1768; 9th/19th Baron Dunboyne	Pierce Butler d. 1773; 10th/20th Baron Dunboyne	John Butler; 1731–1800; 12th/22nd Baron Dunboyne	James Butler d. 1784
Marquess of Ormonde (2nd creation)	Baron Ormonde of Llanthony, 1821
and Baron Butler of Llanthony, 1816	Marquess of Ormonde (3rd creation), 1825	Earl of Kilkenny, 1793
Walter Butler; 1770–1820; Marquess of Ormonde, etc., 18th Earl of Ormond, 11th Earl of Ossory, 10th Viscount Thurles, Baron Butler of Llanthony	James Butler; 1777–1838; 1st Marquess of Ormonde, etc., 19th Earl of Ormond, 12th Earl of Ossory, 10th Viscount Thurles	Edmund Butler; 1771–1846; Earl of Kilkenny, 12th Viscount Mountgarret	Henry Butler; 1773–1842	Somerset Butler; 1779–1838; 3rd Earl of Carrick, 10th Viscount Ikerrin	Henry Edward Butler; 1780–1856	Pierce Butler d. 1785; 11th/21st Baron Dunboyne	James Butler; 1780–1850; 13th/23rd Baron Dunboyne
Marquessate of Ormonde (1st creation), etc. extinct, 1820	Earldom of Kilkenny extinct, 1846
John Butler; 1808–1854; 2nd Marquess of Ormonde, etc., 20th Earl of Ormond, 13th Earl of Ossory, 11th Viscount Thurles	Henry Butler; 1816–1900; 13th Viscount Mountgarret	Henry Butler; 1834–1846; 4th Earl of Carrick, 11th Viscount Ikerrin	Somerset Butler; 1835–1901; 5th Earl of Carrick, 12th Viscount Ikerrin	Charles George Butler; 1823–1854	Theobald Butler; 1806–1881; 14th/24th Baron Dunboyne
James Butler; 1844–1919; 3rd Marquess of Ormonde, etc., 21st Earl of Ormond, 14th Earl of Ossory, 12th Viscount Thurles	Arthur Butler; 1849–1943; 4th Marquess of Ormonde, etc., 22nd Earl of Ormond, 15th Earl of Ossory, 13th Viscount Thurles	James Theobald Butler; 1852–1929	Henry Butler; 1844–1912; 14th Viscount Mountgarret	Charles Butler; 1851–1909; 6th Earl of Carrick, 13th Viscount Ikerrin	James Clifford-Butler; 1839–1899; 15th/25th Baron Dunboyne	Robert Butler; 1844–1913; 16th/26th Baron Dunboyne
Baron Butler of Mount Juliet, 1912
Arthur Butler; 1890–1949; 5th Marquess of Ormonde, etc., 23rd Earl of Ormond, 16th Earl of Ossory, 14th Viscount Thurles	Arthur Butler; 1890–1949; 6th Marquess of Ormonde, etc., 24th Earl of Ormond, 17th Earl of Ossory, 15th Viscount Thurles	Charles Butler; 1899–1997; 7th Marquess of Ormonde, etc., 25th Earl of Ormond, 18th Earl of Ossory, 16th Viscount Thurles	Edmund Butler; 1875–1918; 15th Viscount Mountgarret	Charles Butler; 1873–1931; 7th Earl of Carrick, 14th Viscount Ikerrin, 1st Baron Butler of Mount Juliet	Fitzwalter Butler; 1874–1945; 17th/27th Baron Dunboyne
Marquessate of Ormonde extinct, earldoms of Ormond and Ossory, and viscountcy Thurles dormant, 1997
James Butler; 1916–1940 styled Viscount Thuries	Piers Butler; 1903–1966; 16th Viscount Mountgarret	Theobald Butler; 1903–1957; 8th Earl of Carrick, 15th Viscount Ikerrin, 2nd Baron Butler of Mount Juliet
Richard Butler; 1936–2004; 17th Viscount Mountgarret	Brian Butler; 1931–1992; 9th Earl of Carrick, 16th Viscount Ikerrin, 3rd Baron Butler of Mount Juliet	Patrick Butler; 1917–2004; 18th/28th Baron Dunboyne
Piers Butler b. 1961; 18th Viscount Mountgarret	David Butler; 1953–2008; 10th Earl of Carrick, 17th Viscount Ikerrin, 4th Baron Butler of Mount Juliet	John Butler; 1951–2013; 19th/29th Baron Dunboyne
Heir presumptive to the earldoms of Ormonde and Ossory
Arion Butler b. 1975; 11th Earl of Carrick, 18th Viscount Ikerrin, 5th Baron Butler of Mount Juliet	Piers Butler b. 1979	Richard Butler b. 1983; 20th/30th Baron Dunboyne
Heir presumptive to the Earldom of Carrick
Theo Oliver Stafford Butler b. 2015	Caspian Fitzwalter Butler b. 2020
Heir apparent to the viscountcy Mountgarret	Heir apparent to the barony Dunboyne

== See also ==
- Earl of Ormond (Ireland)
- Butler dynasty
