= Earl of Carrick (disambiguation) =

Earl of Carrick is a title that may refer to:

- Earl of Carrick, a comital lordship in the south-west of Scotland; the title has been recreated several times in the Peerage of Scotland
- Earl of Carrick (Ireland), a comital lordship in County Tipperary, Ireland; the title has been created twice in the Peerage of Ireland
