= Sir Richard Butler (Polestown) =

Sir Richard Butler of Polestown, County Kilkenny (died 20 August 1619), was a descendant of the Butler family - the Earls of Ormond. He was the third son of Edmond Butler of Polestown. He was invested as a Knight on 21 April 1605. His older brother Peter founded the "Roscrea" cadet branch of the family, which is in turn descended from the "Polestown" cadet branch.

== Ancestry ==
- James Butler, 3rd Earl of Ormond

- Sir Richard Butler of Polestown, the second son of the 3rd Earl.

- Sir Edmund MacRichard Butler, the eldest son of Sir Richard.

- Walter Butler of Polestown, second son of Edmund MacRichard.

- Edmond Butler of Polestown, the son of Walter. He was the father of Richard Butler of Polestown.

Through his ancestor Edmund MacRichard Butler, Sir Richard is related to the Polestown cadet branch of the family. Edmund MacRichard Butler's eldest son, Sir James Butler headed up the Polestown house. This line would go on to produce a series of Earls and Dukes of Ormond. "The MacRichard"'s second son, Walter, would go on to produce the "Roscrea" cadet line as well as the minor nobility of Baronets Polestown.

== Children ==
His sons were:

- Edmond Butler, who was 24 years of age when his father died. On 20 November 1628, Edmond had a special livery of his estate. He married Ellice, daughter of Nicholas Shortall of Claragh, County Kilkenny and had issue,

- Sir Walter Butler, 1st Baronet.

- Richard
- Peter
- Walter

== See also ==
- Butler dynasty
