= Sir Reginald Butler, 1st Baronet =

English businessman (1866–1933)

Sir Reginald Butler Bt
- Butler in 1922
- Born: Robert Reginald Frederick Butler; 19 June 1866; Edford, Somerset, England
- Died: 19 November 1933 (aged 67)
- Occupation: Businessman

Sir Robert Reginald Frederick Butler, 1st Baronet (19 June 1866 – 19 November 1933) was an English businessman.

Butler was born in Edford, Somerset, and educated at Bedford School. He was director of a number of catering and confectionery companies, notably chairman of United Dairies. He was created a Baronet in the 1922 New Year Honours for his wartime services.

== Footnotes ==
Baronetage of the United Kingdom
New title	Baronet (of Old Park); 1922–1933	Succeeded by Reginald Thomas Butler
