= Walter Butler of Roscrea =

Irish military officer

Walter Butler
- Born: c. 1600; Ballinakill Castle, Roscrea, County Tipperary, Ireland
- Died: 25 December 1634; Schorndorf, Württemberg, Holy Roman Empire
- Burial place: Prague, Bohemia
- Military career
- Allegiance: Holy Roman Empire (Imperial Army)
- Branch: Imperial Army
- Rank: Colonel (Oberst)
- Unit: Dragoon regiment
- Known for: Involvement in the assassination of Albrecht von Wallenstein (1634)
- Conflicts: Thirty Years' War Siege of Frankfurt-an-der-Oder (1631); Battle of Zirndorf (1632); Battle of Lützen (1632); Battle of Nördlingen (1634)

Walter Butler of Ballinakill Castle, Roscrea (c. 1600 – 25 December 1634) was a military officer, who served as a colonel (Oberst) in the Imperial Army under Albrecht von Wallenstein and was involved in Wallenstein's assassination in 1634.

== Career ==
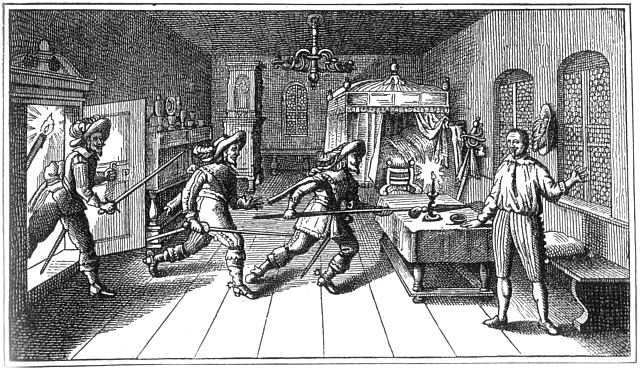
The Killing of Wallenstein in 1634, led by Butler

When his family estates in Roscrea, County Tipperary were confiscated in 1616, Walter became a soldier of fortune. He emigrated to Germany early in the 17th century with his brother, James. Walter and James entered the armed forces of the Habsburg emperor Ferdinand II and Walter served with distinction as a colonel in the Thirty Years' War. In 1631 he and his Irish officers fought under General Tilly against MacKay's Swedish regiment laying siege to Frankfurt-an-der-Oder. Injured and captured by the Swedish, he was accused of being responsible for the loss of the Oder fortress. Butler made King Gustavus Adolphus of Sweden certify his bravery and after his release appeared at the Imperial headquarters before Field Marshal Rudolf von Tiefenbach, where his opponents had to withdraw their accusations.

In 1632 he joined the armed forces under Wallenstein, who, in view of the Swedish progress, had been again appointed Imperial commander-in-chief by Emperor Ferdinand II. Butler quickly gained the trust of the Generalissimo and was appointed Colonel of a dragoon regiment. While the Imperial army fought against the Swedish at Zirndorf and Lützen, Wallenstein's envoys were in secret discussions with the opponents, which led to accusations of making peace with the King of Sweden without the consent of the Emperor. When Wallenstein's treachery was discovered in 1632, it was Butler who "saved the Empire" and arranged his assassination in 1634. He together with the officers John Gordon and Walter Leslie had the plot executed on 25 February, after the murder of Wallenstein's confidants Christian von Ilow, Adam Erdmann Trčka von Lípa and Vilém Kinský.

According Walter Butler's entry in the Compendium of Irish Biography (1878):

"Both [Butler brothers] obtained command of regiments, and served with distinction under Tilly and Wallenstein in many of the actions of the Thirty Years' War. When it became evident to Walter that Wallenstein was turning traitor to the Emperor, and going over to the enemy, he conspired with several other officers, and caused the assassination of that great commander, at Egra, on 25th February 1634. For this crime he was created a Count of the Empire, and large estates in Bohemia, still held by his descendants, were settled on him [..] He died in Wirtemberg shortly after the battle of Nordlingen, at which he distinguished himself, in September 1634, and was buried with great pomp at Prague. He or his brother left a bequest to found a college of Irish Franciscans in that city."

Emperor Ferdinand II created him a Count (Graf) of the Empire, bestowed on him the domain of Friedberg and presented him with the Imperial Gold Chain. Walter Butler remained in the emperor's service and died while fighting at Schorndorf on 25 December 1634.

== Ballinakill Castle ==
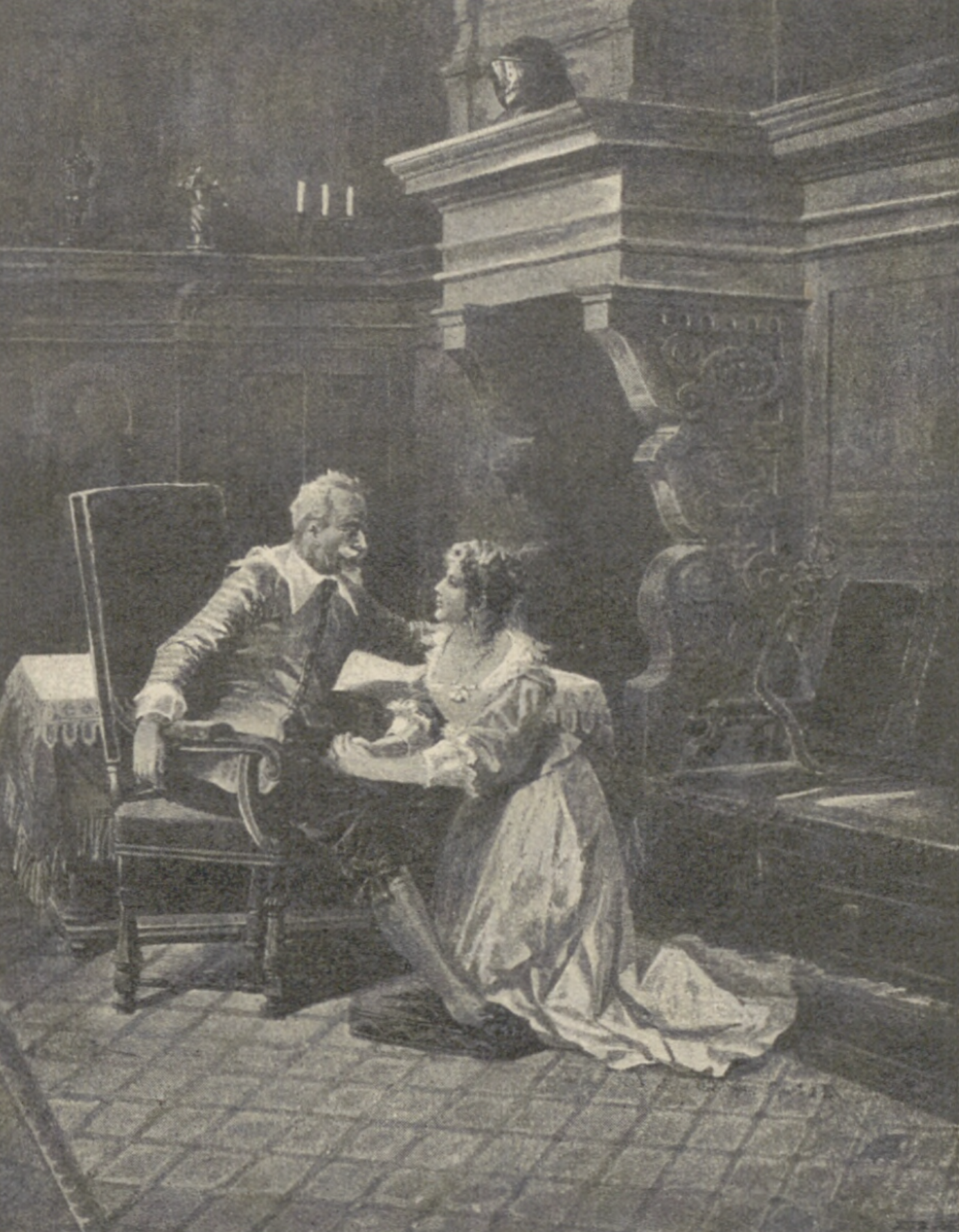
Walter with his daughter Catherine

Ballinakill Castle lies between Roscrea and Dunkerrin. The ruins can now be seen on the main Dublin-Limerick road (N7) about six kilometers on the Nenagh side of Roscrea. It is more of a fortified house than a true castle, similar to Cloncourse Castle. The exact date of the fortification is uncertain but is no earlier than 1580 when Pierce Butler of Paulstown bought land there. The three-story fortified house has long been gutted and only the shell remains of this large building. What is most impressive about the site however, is not the house but the impressive bawn around it. A bawn is very similar to the curtain walls of a castle. The bawn at Ballinakill is still one of the finest in the country. The castle was acquired by Sir Richard Stephens, who sold it in 1680 to a former Cromwellian soldier, Col. Charles Minchin. His descendants, two of whom were High Sheriffs of Tipperary, added a house at the southern end. Humphrey Minchin moved to England in 1760.

== Ancestry ==
Walter Butler was a descendant of the Butler family – the Earls of Ormond. He was the son of Peter Butler of Roscrea. The "Roscrea" cadet branch of the family is in turn descended from the "Polestown" cadet branch.

- James Butler, 3rd Earl of Ormond

- Sir Richard Butler of Polestown, the second son of the 3rd Earl.

- Sir Edmund MacRichard Butler, the eldest son of Sir Richard.

- Walter Butler of Polestown, second son of Edmund MacRichard.

- Edmond Butler of Polestown, son of Walter.

- Peter Butler of Roscrea, second son of Edmond.

== See also ==
- Butler dynasty
