= Edmond Butler of Polestown =

Edmond Butler of Polestown, (c. 1595 - 21 April 1636), was a descendant of the Butler family - the Earls of Ormond. He was the eldest son of Sir Richard Butler (Poletown) and great grandson of Walter Butler of Poletown. His brothers were Richard, Peter and Walter. His uncle Peter founded the "Roscrea" cadet branch of the family, which is in turn descended from the "Polestown" cadet branch. He held the office of Member of Parliament (M.P.) for County Kilkenny from 1634 to 1635.

== Family ==
- James Butler, 3rd Earl of Ormond
  - Sir Richard Butler of Polestown, the second son of the 3rd Earl.
    - Sir Edmund MacRichard Butler, the eldest son of Sir Richard.
      - Sir James Butler, eldest son of Edmund MacRichard.
        - Piers Butler, 8th Earl of Ormond, eldest legitimate son of Sir James.
      - Walter Butler of Polestown (fl. 1483), second son of Edmund MacRichard.
        - Edmond Butler of Polestown, the son of Walter.
          - Sir Richard Butler of Poletown, the son of Edmond.

As the great-grandson of Walter Butler of Polestown, Edmond was a member of the Polestown cadet branch of the Butler family. He was 24 years of age when his father died. On 20 November 1628, he had a special livery of his estate. He married Ellice, daughter of Nicholas Shortall of Claragh, County Kilkenny and had issue,

- Sir Walter Butler, 1st Baronet.

Polestown, also known as Poulstown, is today called Paulstown and is located in the Barony of Gowran, County Kilkenny.

== See also ==
- Butler baronets
- Butler dynasty
