= Earl of Ormond (Ireland) =

Irish peerage

Augmentation arms of Butler, Earl & Marquess of Ormonde: Gules, three covered cups or. The Earls of Ormond, quartered this arms with the arms of their ancestor Theobald Walter, 1st Baron Butler (died 1206) (Or, a chief indented azure) in the 1st quarter

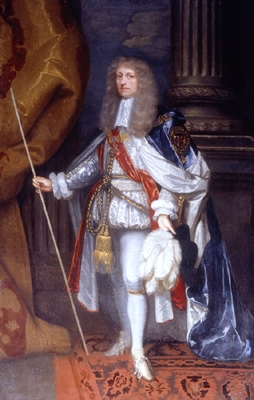
James Butler, 1st Duke of Ormonde.

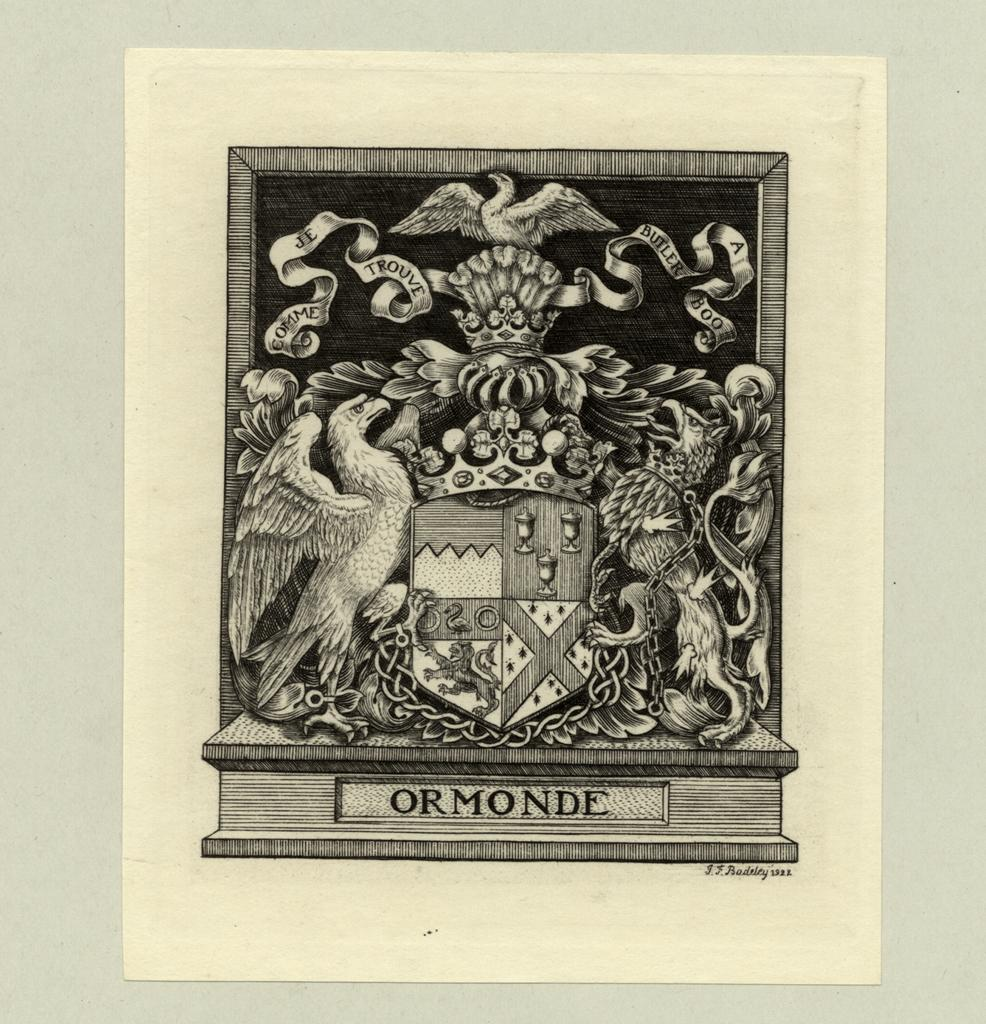
Bookplate by Henry Badeley showing the coat of arms of the Butlers, Earls of Ormonde: Quarterly 1st: Or, a chief indented azure (Walter); 2nd: Gules, three covered cups or (Butler); 3rd: Argent, a lion rampant gules on a chief of the second a swan close argent between two annulets or (Carrick); 4th: Ermine, a saltire gules

The peerage title Earl of Ormond and the related titles Duke of Ormonde and Marquess of Ormonde have a long and complex history. An earldom of Ormond has been created three times in the Peerage of Ireland. The earldom comprised the entirety of what is now County Kilkenny, large swathes of County Tipperary, and parts of County Waterford and County Carlow.

== History of Ormonde titles ==
The earldom of Ormond was originally created in 1328 for James Butler. For many subsequent years, the earls took significant roles in the government of Ireland, and kept a tradition of loyalty to the English crown and to English custom. Several of the earls also had reputations as scholars. The fifth earl was created Earl of Wiltshire (1449) in the Peerage of England, but he was attainted in 1461 and his peerages were declared forfeit. The earldom of Ormond was restored to his younger brother, John Butler, the sixth earl, in 1476. Thomas, the 7th earl, died without issue in 1515; the de facto, if not indeed the de jure earl, Piers Butler, a cousin of the 7th Earl, was induced to resign his rights to the title in 1528. This facilitated the next creation by awarding the titles of Ormond and Wiltshire to Thomas Boleyn, who was the father of Anne Boleyn. At that time, Anne was the mistress of King Henry VIII of England. As a maternal grandson of the 7th Earl, Thomas Boleyn had a slim claim to the title. Through his daughter, Anne, he was the grandfather of Elizabeth I of England. On the death of Boleyn, these peerages of the second creation became extinct because he lacked male heirs, his son George having been executed for treason.

As a reward for his patriotism and generosity, Piers Butler was created Earl of Ossory five days after resigning his rights to the other titles. The third creation for Piers Butler (in 1538) merely recognised the reality of the situation prior to the Boleyn irruption, and in 1544 an act of parliament confirmed him in the possession of his earldom, which was declared to be the creation of 1328, and not the new creation of 1538. James Butler, the fifth earl of this creation, was made Marquess of Ormonde (1642) and Duke of Ormonde (1660) in the Peerage of Ireland, and Duke of Ormonde (1682) in the Peerage of England. Through his marriage with his cousin Elizabeth Preston, granddaughter of the third earl, he had reunited the titles with the Ormonde estates. After 1682, the spelling "Ormonde" was used almost universally.

== Other titles held by the earls ==
Prior to the creation of the Earldom of Ormond, the First Earl's father had been created the first Earl of Carrick. However, this title did not pass to James Butler. After a gap of seven years following his father's death, James, who had recently married Eleanor de Bohun (a granddaughter of Edward I) was rewarded with an earldom in his own right – Ormond.

The 2nd Earl of Ormond was known widely as the Earl of Gowran (1385), a customary title. A later peerage title, the Earldom of Gowran, was granted to the seventh son of the 1st Duke of Ormond in 1676 but became extinct within less than two years. A subsidiary barony title – Baron Gowran – was held by the FitzPatricks, Earls of Upper Ossory, between 1715 and 1818.

Subsidiary titles for the dukes were Earl of Brecknock (1660) and Baron Butler (1660) in the Peerage of England and Earl of Ormond (1328), Earl of Ossory (1538) and Viscount Thurles (1536) in the Peerage of Ireland. In 1715, the second duke was attainted and his English peerages declared forfeit. In 1758 the de jure third duke (Irish) died and the dukedom and marquessate became extinct. Walter, the eleventh earl, was given an English peerage as Lord Butler of Llanthony in 1801, and was created the Marquess of Ormonde in the Peerage of Ireland in 1816; on his death that title became extinct and the earldoms passed to his brother, for whom the title Marquess of Ormonde was created in the Peerage of Ireland in 1825. That title became extinct in 1997, while the earldom became dormant.

An unrelated Earldom of Ormonde was twice created in the Peerage of Scotland.

== Earls of Ormond; First creation (1328) ==
- James Butler, 1st Earl of Ormond (c. 1305–1338)
- James Butler, 2nd Earl of Ormond (1331–1382)
- James Butler, 3rd Earl of Ormond (1361–1405)
- James Butler, 4th Earl of Ormond (1392–1452)
- James Butler, 5th Earl of Ormond and 1st Earl of Wiltshire (1420–1461)
- John Butler, 6th Earl of Ormond (1422–1478)
- Thomas Butler, 7th Earl of Ormond (c. 1426–1515)

== Earls of Ormond; Second creation (1529) ==
- Thomas Boleyn, 1st Earl of Wiltshire and 1st Earl of Ormond (1477–1539)

== Earls of Ormond; First creation (Reversed) / Third creation (1538) ==
- Piers Butler, 8th Earl of Ormond (1467–1539) (also 1st Earl of Ossory in 1528)
- James Butler, 9th Earl of Ormond (1496–1546) (also 1st Viscount Thurles in 1536)
- Thomas Butler, 10th Earl of Ormond (1532–1614). Distant cousin of Elizabeth I
  - James Butler, Viscount Thurles (born 1584)
- Walter Butler, 11th Earl of Ormond (1569–1634)
  - Thomas Butler, Viscount Thurles (died 1619)
- James Butler, 12th Earl of Ormonde (1610–1688) (created Duke of Ormonde in 1661)

== Dukes of Ormonde (1661 Ireland and 1682 England) ==
- James Butler, 1st Duke of Ormonde (1610–1688)
  - Thomas Butler, Viscount Thurles (c. 1632–1633)
  - Thomas Butler, 6th Earl of Ossory (1634–1680)
- James Butler, 2nd Duke of Ormonde (1665–1745) (title forfeited in 1715, subsequently held to apply only to the English dukedom)
- Charles Butler, 3rd Duke of Ormonde (1671–1758) (Irish title held de jure unbeknownst to the holder)

== Earls of Ormonde; First and Third creation (1328, 1538; Reverted) ==
- John Butler, 15th and 8th Earl of Ormonde (died 1766) (de jure)
- Walter Butler, 16th Earl of Ormonde (1703–1783) (de jure)
- John Butler, 17th Earl of Ormonde (1740–1795)
- Walter Butler, 18th Earl of Ormonde (1770–1820) (created Marquess of Ormonde in 1816)

== Marquesses of Ormonde (1816) ==
- Walter Butler, 1st Marquess of Ormonde (1770–1820)

== Earls of Ormonde; First and Third creation (1328, 1538; Reverted) ==
- James Wandesford Butler, 19th Earl of Ormonde and 12th Earl of Ossory (1777–1838) (created Marquess of Ormonde in 1825)

== Marquesses of Ormonde (1825) ==
- James Wandesford Butler, 1st Marquess of Ormonde and 19th Earl of Ormonde (1777–1838)
- John Butler, 2nd Marquess of Ormonde and 20th Earl of Ormonde (1808–1854)
- James Edward Butler, 3rd Marquess of Ormonde and 21st Earl of Ormonde (1844–1919)
- Arthur Butler, 4th Marquess of Ormonde and 22nd Earl of Ormonde (1849–1943)
- George Butler, 5th Marquess of Ormonde and 23rd Earl of Ormonde (1890–1949)
  - James Anthony Butler, Viscount Thurles (1916–1940)
- Arthur Butler, 6th Marquess of Ormonde and 24th Earl of Ormonde (1893–1971)
- Charles Butler, 7th Marquess of Ormonde and 25th Earl of Ormonde (1899–1997); earldoms dormant in 1997; marquessate extinct.

The 3rd Marquess of Ormonde is recorded as having written to the then Prime Minister of the United Kingdom, Benjamin Disraeli, regarding the restoration of the Dukedom of Ormonde in October 1868. Lord Ormonde claimed that his grandfather, James Butler, 1st Marquess of Ormonde (then 19th Earl of Ormond) had been advised by Lord Liverpool to apply for the restoration of the dukedom, and that Lord Liverpool had advised him that in order to achieve this, he would first need to apply to be elevated from the rank of Earl to Marquess. An application was duly made, and James, 19th Earl of Ormond was granted the title Marquess of Ormonde. The 3rd Marquess believed that Lord Liverpool's loss of the Office of Prime Minister in 1827 frustrated this plan, and the 1st Marquess took no further action towards applying for the restoration of the dukedom. The 3rd Marquess also alleged in his letter to Prime Minister Disraeli that his father, John Butler, 2nd Marquess of Ormonde had resolved not to pursue the restoration of the Dukedom of Ormonde unless another peer was also elevated to a Dukedom during his lifetime. Disraeli responded to the 3rd Marquess' letter on 27 October 1868, and expressed his sympathy with Lord Ormonde's desire to restore "the title of an illustrious ancestor". However, in his letter, Disraeli implied that the political climate of the time did not render the creation, or restoration, of the Dukedom of Ormonde to be appropriate, noting that "the condition of the party [the Conservative Party] is now critical".

== Earls of Ormonde and Ossory (1328/1538; Reverted) ==
The presumed successors of the 7th marquess in the Earldoms of Ormonde and Ossory have been the 17th and 18th Viscounts Mountgarret, descending in the male line from a younger son of the 8th Earl; however, no claim from the 17th or 18th viscount was submitted to the Monarch.

== Family tree ==
Butler dynasty family tree including the Earls of Carrick and Irish Earls of Ormond

Theobald Walter; 1165–1206; 1st Chief Butler of Ireland
Theobald le Botiller; 1201–1230; 2nd Chief Butler of Ireland
Theobald Butler; 1224–1248; 3rd Chief Butler of Ireland
King Edward I 1239–1307	Theobald Butler; 1242–1285; 4th Chief Butler of Ireland
Earl of Carrick (1st creation), 1315	Baron Dunboyne (by prescription), 1324
Elizabeth of Rhuddlan; 1282–1316	Theobald Butler; 1269–1299; 5th Chief Butler of Ireland	Edmund Butler; 1268–1321; Earl of Carrick	Thomas Butler; 1271–1329; 1st Baron Dunboyne
Earldom of Carrick (1st creation) extinct, 1321
Earl of Ormond (1st creation), 1328)
Eleanor de Bohun; 1304–1363	James Butler; 1304–1338; 1st Earl of Ormonde	John Butler of Clonamicklon; 1305–1330
James Butler; 1331–1382; 2nd Earl of Ormonde	Edmund of Lismalin; 1325-1372
James Butler c. 1359–1405; 3rd Earl of Ormonde	James Butler of Lismalin; 1361–1405
James Butler; 1393–1452; 4th Earl of Ormonde	Richard Butler of Polestown; 1395–1443
James Butler; 1420–1461; 5th Earl of Ormonde	John Butler d. 1476; 6th Earl of Ormonde	John Butler; 1426–1515; 7th Earl of Ormonde	Edmund MacRichard Butler of Polestown; 1420–1464
James Butler of Polestown d. 1487	Walter Butler of Polestown fl. 1483
Earl of Ormond (2nd creation), 1529	Earl of Ossory, 1528
Thomas Boleyn c. 1477–1539; Earl of Ormond, Earl of Wiltshire	The Boleyn and Butler families were unrelated	Piers Butler c. 1467–1539; 8th Earl of Ormond, 1st Earl of Ossory	Theobald Butler of Polestown	Edmond Butler of Poletown
Earldom of Ormonde (1st creation) resigned, 1528 and restored, 1538
Viscount Mountgarret, 1550
Anne Boleyn c. 1501 or c. 1507 – 1536	King Henry VIII; 1491–1547	James Butler; 1496–1546; 9th Earl of Ormond, 2nd Earl of Ossory	Richard Butler; 1500–1571; 1st Viscount Mountgarret	Eleanor Butler
Thomas Butler; 1531–1614; 10th Earl of Ormond, 3rd Earl of Ossory	Edmund Butler of Cloughgrenan; 1534 – c. 1585	John Butler of Kilcash d. 1570	Edmund Butler c. 1562 – 1602; 2nd Viscount Mountgarret
Viscount Butler of Tulleophelim, 1603
Theobald Butler d. 1613; Viscount Butler of Tulleophelim	Walter Butler; 1559–1633; 11th Earl of Ormond, 4th Earl of Ossory	Helen Butler d. 1631	Richard Butler; 1578–1651; 3rd Viscount Mountgarret
Viscountcy Butler of Tulleophelim extinct, 1613
Lord Dingwall, 1609
Elizabeth Butler c. 1585 – 1628	Richard Preston d. 1628; Earl of Desmond, 1st Lord Dingwall	Thomas Butler a. 1596 – 1619 styled Viscount Thurles	Edmund Butler; 1595–1679; 4th Viscount Mountgarret
Marquess of Ormonde, 1642; Duke of Ormonde (Ireland), 1661; Duke of Ormonde (England), 1682
Elizabeth Preston; 1615–1684; 2nd Baroness Dingwall, suo jure	James FitzThomas Butler; 1610–1688; 1st Duke of Ormond, etc., 12th Earl of Ormond, 5th Earl of Ossory	Richard Butler of Kilcash; 1615–1701	Richard Butler d. 1707; 5th Viscount Mountgarret
Earl of Arran (1st Irish creation), Viscount Tullogh (1st creation), Baron Butler of Cloughgrennan (1st creation), 1662
Baron Butler of Moore Park, 1666	Baron Butler of Weston (1st creation), 1673	Earl of Gowran, 1676
Thomas Butler; 1634–1680; 13th Earl of Ormond, 6th Earl of Ossory, 1st Baron Butler	Richard Butler; 1639–1686; Earl of Arran, etc.	John Butler; 1643–1677; 1st Earl of Gowran	Walter Butler of Garryricken d. 1700
Earldom of Arran (1st Irish creation) and subsidiary titles extinct, 1686	Earldom of Gowran extinct, 1677
Earl of Arran (2nd Irish creation), Viscount Tullogh (2nd creation), Baron Butler of Cloughgrennan (2nd creation), 1693; Baron Butler of Weston (2nd creation), 1694; Duke of Arran (Jacobite), 1722
James FitzThomas Butler; 1665–1745; 2nd Duke of Ormond, etc., 14th Earl of Ormond, 7th Earl of Ossory, 3rd Lord Dingwall, 2nd Baron Butler	Charles Butler; 1671–1758; 3rd Duke of Ormond, de jure, Earl of Arran, etc.	Thomas Butler of Garryricken d. 1738	John Butler of Garryricken d. 1738	Edmund Butler; 1663–1735; 6th Viscount Mountgarret
Dukedom of Ormonde (England and Scotland) forfeit by attainder, 1715, but Irish dukedom continued	Dukedom of Arran (Jacobite), dukedom of Ormonde (Ireland), earldom of Arran, and subsidiary titles, and barony Butler extinct, 1758
John Butler of Kilcash and Garryricken d. 1766; 15th Earl of Ormond, 8th Earl of Ossory de jure	Richard Butler; 1685–1736; 7th Viscount Mountgarret	James Butler; 1686–1749; 8th Viscount Mountgarret	Edmund Butler; 1687–1751; 9th Viscount Mountgarret
Walter Butler of Kilcash and Garryricken; 1703–1783; 16th Earl of Ormond, 9th Earl of Ossory de jure	Edmund Butler d. 1779; 10th Viscount Mountgarret
Edmund Butler; 1745–1793; 11th Viscount Mountgarret
Earl of Kilkenny, 1793
Edmund Butler; 1771–1846; Earl of Kilkenny, 12th Viscount Mountgarret	Henry Butler; 1773–1842
Earldom of Kilkenny extinct, 1846
Henry Butler; 1771–1846; 13th Viscount Mountgarret
Henry Butler; 1844–1912; 14th Viscount Mountgarret
Edmund Butler; 1875–1918; 15th Viscount Mountgarret	Piers Butler; 1903–1966; 16th Viscount Mountgarret
Richard Butler; 1936–2004; 17th Viscount Mountgarret
Piers Butler b. 1961; 18th Viscount Mountgarret
Heir presumptive to the earldoms of Ormonde and Ossory
Theo Oliver Stafford Butler b. 2015
Heir presumptive to the viscountcy Mountgarret

== See also ==
- Irish nobility
- Butler dynasty
