= Peter Butler of Roscrea =

Peter Butler of Roscrea, County Tipperary, was a descendant of the Butler family - the Earls of Ormond. He was the second son of Edmond Butler of Polestown. The "Roscrea" cadet branch of the family is in turn descended from the "Polestown" cadet branch.

== Ancestry ==
- James Butler, 3rd Earl of Ormond

- Sir Richard Butler of Polestown, the second son of the 3rd Earl.

- Sir Edmund MacRichard Butler, the eldest son of Sir Richard.

- Walter Butler of Polestown, second son of Edmund MacRichard.

- Edmond Butler of Polestown, the son of Walter. He was the father of Peter Butler of Polestown.

Through his ancestor Edmund MacRichard Butler, Peter is related to the Polestown cadet branch of the family. Edmund MacRichard Butler's eldest son, Sir James Butler headed up the Polestown house. This line would go on to produce a series of Earls and Dukes of Ormond. The second son of "The MacRichard", Walter, would go on to produce this "Roscrea" cadet line as well as the minor nobility of Baronets Polestown. Peter's grand-nephew Sir Walter was the 1st Baronet.

== Marriage and Children ==
By his wife, Catherine de Burgo, (de Burgh) he had three sons, who all died without any children of their own, and were:

- Edmond Butler of Roscrea,
- Walter Butler of Roscrea, who being a commander under Ferdinand II, Holy Roman Emperor, had given him the Lordship of Hesberg (Hessberg) in Germany, which descended to the House of Polestown;
- Theobald Butler of Roscrea, who died in Poland in 1634.

== See also ==
- Butler dynasty
