= Theobald Butler, 14th Baron Dunboyne =

Irish peer

Theobald Fitzwalter Butler
- Baron Dunboyne
- Predecessor: James Butler
- Successor: James Butler
- Born: February 11, 1806
- Died: March 22, 1881 (aged 75)
- Father: James Butler, 13th Baron Dunboyne
- Mother: Eleanor O'Connell

Theobald Fitzwalter Butler, 14th Baron Dunboyne (11 February 1806 – 22 March 1881) was an Irish peer.

He was the son of James Butler, 13th Baron Dunboyne by his first wife, Eleanor O'Connell. On 6 July 1850, he succeeded to his father's titles as the 14th and 24th Baron Dunboyne. His right to the title was confirmed by the House of Lords on 10 August 1860. Dunboyne was elected as an Irish representative peer in 1868, and sat on the Conservative benches in the Lords until his death.

He married Julia Celestina Maria Brander, daughter of William Brander, on 14 November 1832. Together they had seven children.

Political offices
Preceded by The Earl of Rosse	Representative peer for Ireland; 1860–1881	Succeeded by The Earl of Bandon
Peerage of Ireland
Preceded by James Butler	Baron Dunboyne; 1850–1881	Succeeded by James Butler
