= Edmund Butler, Earl of Kilkenny =

Edmund Butler, Earl of Kilkenny, 12th Viscount Mountgarret (6 January 1771 – 16 July 1846) was created Earl of Kilkenny on 20 December 1793.

== Biography ==
The son of Edmund Butler, 11th Viscount Mountgarret and Henrietta Butler, he was thus a member of the powerful Butler Dynasty descended from the House of Butler of Ormond, who purchased and resided at Kilkenny Castle from 1391 to 1967.

He married Mildred Fowler, daughter of Robert Fowler, Archbishop of Dublin, without issue. On his death the Earldom thus became extinct and his nephew, Henry Edmund Butler, became the 13th Lord Viscount Mountgarret in 1846.

Peerage of Ireland
New creation	Earl of Kilkenny; 1793–1846	Extinct
Preceded by Edmund Butler	Viscount Mountgarret; 1793–1846	Succeeded by Henry Butler
