= Theobald Butler of Polestown =

Theobald Butler was the illegitimate son of Sir James Butler of Polestown and his wife Sabh Kavanagh. He was the elder brother of Piers Butler, 8th Earl of Ormond and of Edmond Butler of Polestown.

== Issue ==
- Eleanor Butler, married Richard Butler, 1st Viscount Mountgarret

== See also ==
- Butler dynasty

== Sources ==
- Some corrections and additions to The Complete Peerage, http://www.medievalgenealogy.org.uk/, II:448.
