= Earl of Newcastle =

Earl of Newcastle-upon-Tyne is a title that has been created three times. The first creation came in the Peerage of England in 1623 in favour of Ludovic Stewart, 2nd Duke of Lennox. He was made Duke of Richmond at the same time. For information on this creation, see the Duke of Lennox. It became extinct when the first holder died in 1624. The second creation came in the Peerage of England in 1628 in favour of William Cavendish, 1st Viscount Mansfield. He was later created Marquess of Newcastle-upon-Tyne and Duke of Newcastle-upon-Tyne.

== Earls of Newcastle-upon-Tyne, First creation (1623) ==
- see the Duke of Lennox

== Earls of Newcastle-upon-Tyne, Second creation (1628) ==
- see the Duke of Newcastle-upon-Tyne
