= Sir Walter Butler, 1st Baronet =

Irish nobleman

Walter Butler
- 1st baronet, of Polestown
- Died: 1650
- Spouse: Elizabeth Butler
- Father: Edmond Butler of Polestown

Sir Walter Butler, 1st Baronet (died 1650) was an Irish nobleman. He was created a baronet, of Polestown, in the Baronetage of Ireland on 8 July 1645.

== Family ==
Sir Walter Butler was son of Edmond Butler of Polestown (died 21 April 1636) and descendant of James Butler, 3rd Earl of Ormond, belonging to the Polestown branch of the Butler family. He married Elizabeth Butler, daughter of Richard Butler, 3rd Viscount Mountgarret and Margaret O'Neill, likewise a descendant of James Butler, 3rd Earl of Ormond. They had issue Sir Richard Butler, 2nd Baronet Polestown (d. c. 1679).

He held the office of Governor of Kilkenny on 28 March 1650, when it surrendered to Cromwell.

Polestown, also known as Poulstown, is today called Paulstown and is located in County Kilkenny.

== See also ==
- Butler baronets
- Butler dynasty

Baronetage of Ireland
New creation	Baronet (of Polestown); 1645–1650	Succeeded by Richard Butler
