= Walter Butler of Polestown =

Walter Butler of Polestown was High Sheriff of County Kilkenny, Ireland in 1483.

He was the second son of Sir Edmund MacRichard Butler. His nephew Piers would become the 8th Earl of Ormond. He was the father of Edmond Butler of Polestown. (Note: Not to be confused with Edmond Butler of Polestown, c. 1595–1636)

== See also ==
- Butler dynasty
