= Sir Richard Butler of Polestown =

Irish noble

Sir Richard Butler (1395–1443) of Polestown, County Kilkenny, was the second son of James Butler, 3rd Earl of Ormond, and Anne Welles. His older brother James inherited the earldom. Following the extinction of the senior family line, his great-grandson, Piers Butler, became the 8th Earl of Ormond.

Richard was born at Kilkenny Castle and was named in honour of the visiting King Richard II, who had joined his cousin, James Butler, 3rd Earl of Ormond, to campaign against the Irish.

== Marriage and children ==
Richard lived at Polestown Castle and went against the Statutes of Kilkenny by marrying Catherine (1395–1420), the daughter of an Irish nobleman, Gildas O’Reilly, Lord of East Breifne. By his wife he had several children, the eldest of whom adopted the Gaelic title of The MacRichard of Ossory.

- Sir Edmund MacRichard Butler (1420–1464)

== See also ==
- Butler dynasty
