= Edmund MacRichard Butler =

Irish noble (1420 – 1464)

Sir Edmund MacRichard Butler of Polestown (1420 – June 13, 1464) was the eldest son of Sir Richard Butler of Polestown and adopted the Gaelic title of The MacRichard of Ossory.

== Career ==
Like his father before him, Edmund was the Lord Deputy to his cousin, James Butler, 5th Earl of Ormond who was absent from Ireland (and had even given the English title of Earl of Wiltshire in 1449). Edmund first came to attention in 1443 when he instigated the murder of Finan and Dermot MacGillapadraig, the sons of the King of the ruling Irish clan in Ossory.

In 1447, Edmund founded the bridge at Carrick-on-Suir – the first over the estuary.

In 1462, his second cousin John Butler, 6th Earl of Ormond, arrived in Ireland with the objective of opening another front against the Yorkists during the Wars of the Roses. Enlisting Edmund MacRichard's help, he captured Waterford and along with it, the son of the Earl of Desmond. A longtime enemy of the Butlers, Desmond had been encroaching on the weakened Butler patrimony in County Tipperary by moving up the Suir valley towards Waterford. Edmund swept down to meet him but was heavily defeated, losing 400 men and was captured at the Battle of Pilltown. Ormond fled and Kilkenny was plundered by the Desmonds.

It was said that part of Edmund's ransom was paid with manuscripts from his library including the Psalter of Cashel which contained genealogies, the Calendar of Aengus and a Glossary written by Cormac mac Cuilennáin, King Bishop of Cashel, which was the first comparative dictionary written in Europe. He was buried at Grey Friars, Kilkenny

== Marriage and Children ==
He married Catherine O'Carroll (who died in 1506), the daughter of Mulroney O'Carroll, Barbatus, King of Elyocarroll (which abutted Ossory). They had three sons, the eldest of whom succeeded him as "The MacRichard of Ossory":

- Sir James Butler
- Walter Butler of Polestown
- John Butler who had two sons,
  - Pierce (the father of Richard Butler FitzPierce, who died childless)
  - John óg (meaning junior) whose son William Butler FitzJohn-óg, was attainted of felony at Kilkenny and executed in Queen Elizabeth I's reign.

== See also ==
- Irish nobility
- Butler dynasty
