= Theobald Butler, 1st Viscount Butler of Tulleophelim =

Irish noble (died 1613)

Theobald Butler
- Viscount Butler of Tulleophelim
- Tenure: 1603–1613
- Died: January 1613
- Spouse: Elizabeth Butler
- Father: Sir Edmund Butler of Cloughgrenan
- Mother: Eleanor Eustace

Theobald Butler, 1st Viscount Butler of Tulleophelim (c. 1570 – December 1613), was an Irish peer.

== Birth and origins ==
Theobald was the son of Sir Edmund Butler by the Honourable Eleanor Eustace, daughter of Rowland Eustace, 2nd Viscount Baltinglass. James Butler, 9th Earl of Ormonde, was his grandfather, and Sir Thomas Butler, 1st Baronet, of Cloughgrenan, his younger brother. He was raised to the Peerage of Ireland as Viscount Butler of Tulleophelim, in the County of Carlow. In 1605 he was appointed Governor of County Carlow.

Family tree

Theobald Butler with wife, parents, and other selected relatives. (Note: This family tree is partly derived from the condensed Butler family tree pictured in Dunboyne.)

Piers; 8th Earl; 1467–1539 | Margaret; FitzGerald c. 1473 – 1542 | James; 10th Earl d. 1529 | Amy; O'Brien
James; 9th Earl; 1496–1546 | Joan; FitzGerald d. 1565 | Gerald; 14th Earl c. 1533 – 1583; Rebel Earl
Thomas; 10th Earl c. 1531 – 1614; Black Tom | Edmund of Cloughgrenan; 1534–1602 | Eleanor; Eustace | John of Kilcash d. 1570
Theobald; Viscount; Tulleophelim d. 1613 | Elizabeth; Butler c. 1585 – 1628 | Richard; Preston; 1st Earl; Desmond d. 1628 | Walter; 11th Earl; 1559–1633 'Beads'
Thomas; Viscount; Thurles d. 1619 d.v.p.*
Elizabeth; Preston; 1615–1684 | James; 1st Duke; 1610–1688 | Richard of Kilcash; 1615–1701

Legend

| XXX | Theobald; Butler | XXX | Earls & dukes of Ormond | XXX | Earls of Desmond |

*d.v.p. = predeceased his father (decessit vita patris).

== Viscount ==
Butler was created Viscount Butler of Tulleophelim by letter patent on 4 August 1603.

== Marriage ==
Lord Butler of Tulleophelim married his first cousin Elizabeth Butler, daughter of Thomas Butler, 10th Earl of Ormond, in 1603. There were no children from the marriage. He died in December 1613, when the viscountcy became extinct. The dowager Viscountess Butler of Tulleophelim married as her second husband Richard Preston, 1st Earl of Desmond. She died in October 1628.

== Death and Timeline ==
Viscount Butler of Tulleophelim died in January 1613.

== Notes and references ==
=== References ===
- Burke, Bernard (1866). A Genealogical History of the Dormant, Abeyant, Forfeited and Extinct Peerages of the British Empire (New ed.). London: Harrison. OCLC 11501348.
- Cokayne, George Edward (1912). Gibbs, Vicary (ed.). The complete peerage of England, Scotland, Ireland, Great Britain and the United Kingdom, extant, extinct, or dormant. Vol. II (2nd ed.). London: St Catherine Press. OCLC 228661424. – Bass to Canning (for Butler of Tulleophelim)
- Dunboyne, Patrick Theobald Tower Butler, Baron (1968). Butler Family History (2nd ed.). Kilkenny: Rothe House.

Peerage of Ireland
| New creation | Viscount Butler of Tulleophelim; 1603–1613 | Extinct |
