= Sir Thomas Butler, 6th Baronet =

Irish politician

Sir Thomas Butler, 6th Baronet (1735 – 7 October 1772) was an Irish politician and baronet.

He was the eldest son of Sir Richard Butler, 5th Baronet and his wife Henrietta Percy, daughter of Henry Percy. Butler sat for County Carlow in the Irish House of Commons from 1761 to 1768, the same constituency several members of his family had represented before. In 1771, Butler stood as Member of Parliament (MP) for Portarlington and also succeeded his father as baronet, however died only a year later.

== Marriage and children ==
On 19 June 1759, Butler married Dorothea Bayly, only daughter of Very Rev. Edward Bayly, Archdeacon of Dublin. They had four daughters and four sons. His oldest son Richard succeeded to the baronetcy.

Parliament of Ireland
Preceded by Sir Richard Butler, 5th Bt; Robert Burton	Member of Parliament for County Carlow; 1761–1768; With: Benjamin Burton 1761–1767; John Hyde 1767–1768	Succeeded by Beauchamp Bagenal; William Henry Burton
Preceded by William Henry Dawson; Roger Palmer	Member of Parliament for Portarlington; 1771–1772; With: Roger Palmer	Succeeded by Joseph Dawson; Roger Palmer
Baronetage of Ireland
Preceded by Richard Butler	Baronet (of Cloughgrenan); 1771–1772	Succeeded by Richard Butler
