= John Butler, 1st Earl of Gowran =

Irish earl (1643–1677)

John Butler
- Earl of Gowran
- Tenure: 1676–1677
- Born: 1643; Dublin
- Died: August 1677 (aged 33–34); Paris
- Spouse: Anne Chichester
- Father: James Butler, 1st Duke of Ormond
- Mother: Elizabeth Preston

John Butler, Earl of Gowran (1643–1677) was an MP in the Irish Parliament 1661–1666 before being created Earl of Gowran in 1676. He married but died childless.

== Early life and family ==
John was born in 1643 in Dublin, the sixth child of James Butler and his wife Elizabeth Preston. At the time his father was the 1st Marquess of Ormond, but he would later become the 1st Duke. His father's family, the Butler dynasty, were Old English.

Family tree

John Butler with wife, parents, and other selected relatives. (Note: This family tree is partly derived from the condensed Butler family tree pictured in Dunboyne. His marriage was childless.)

Richard; Preston; 1st Earl; Desmond d. 1628	Elizabeth; Butler c. 1585 – 1628	Thomas; Viscount; Thurles d. 1619
Elizabeth; Preston; 1615–1684	James; 1st Duke; 1610–1688
Thomas; 6th Earl; Ossory; 1633–1680	John; 1st Earl; Gowran; 1643–1677	Anne; Chichester
James; 2nd Duke; Ormond; 1665–1745	Charles; 1st Earl; Arran; 1671–1758

Elizabeth; Pointz; 1587–1673
Richard of Kilcash; 1615–1701
Walter of Garryricken d. 1700
Thomas of Garryricken d. 1738
John de jure 15th Earl d. 1766

Legend

XXX	Subject of the article	XXX	Earls & dukes of Ormond

John's mother was his father's second cousin once removed. She was a rich heiress, the only child of Richard Preston, 1st Earl of Desmond. His parents had married on Christmas Day 1629. John was one of 10 siblings, but five died in childhood. See Thomas, Richard, and Elizabeth. (Note: John's father's article gives a list of the five surviving siblings.)

John was born in Dublin, where his mother had rejoined his father in 1642 after the Confederates allowed her to leave Kilkenny Castle. In 1647 he was then taken by his parents to England when his father handed Dublin over to the Parliamentarians. In 1648 his mother took him and his siblings to Caen in Normandy, France, while his father stayed somewhat longer in England. His father then also fled to France and was employed by the king in Paris and on international missions. In 1652 the family in Caen ran out of money and his mother went with the children to London and obtained some help from Cromwell. In 1655 she moved to Ireland and lived with her children at Dunmore near Kilkenny. At the restoration, their father rejoined them in Ireland.

== In Parliament ==
On 20 August 1662, during the Irish Parliament (1661–1666), the only one held in the reign of Charles II (1660–1685), John replaced his brother Thomas as the member (MP) for Trinity College as Thomas had been summoned to the House of Lords by a writ of acceleration as Earl of Ossory and could therefore not sit any more in the House of Commons.

== Later life and death ==
In 1671 John, together with his cousin Anthony Hamilton, saved Dublin Castle from destruction by fire.

In January 1674 John married Lady Anne Chichester, only daughter of Arthur Chichester, 1st Earl of Donegall. His marriage stayed childless.

On 13 April 1676, John was created Baron Aghrim, Viscount Clonmore, and Earl of Gowran, all in the peerage of Ireland.

Gowran, as he now was, travelled to Paris for the recovery of his health but died there in August 1677, aged about 34. He left no issue and his titles disappeared with him.

== Notes ==
Peerage of Ireland
New title	Earl of Gowran; 1676–1677	Extinct
