= Elizabeth Butler, Duchess of Ormond =

Irish duchess (1615–1684)

Elizabeth Butler
- Duchess of Ormond
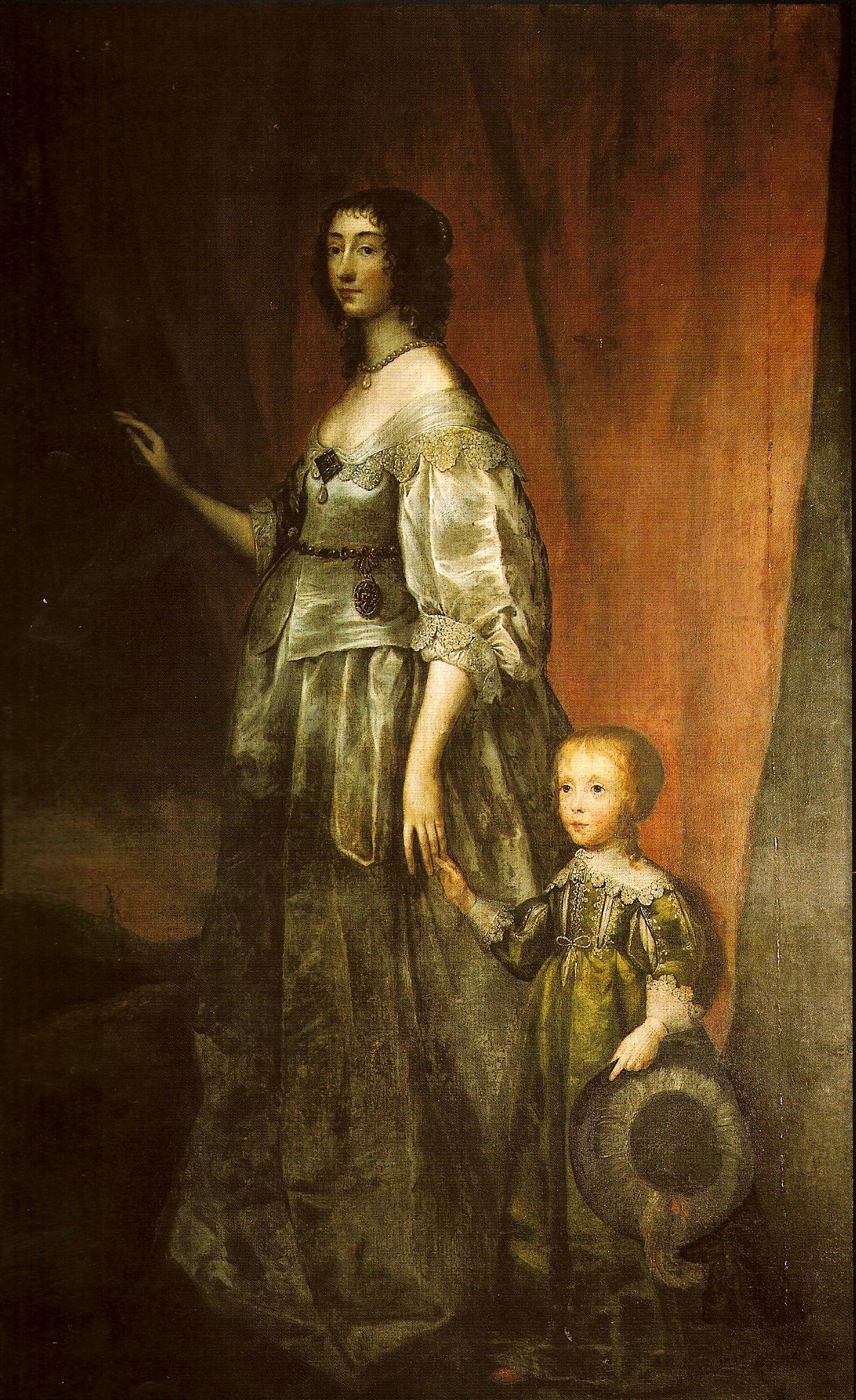
- The Duchess of Ormonde with her son Thomas, Lord Ossory, attributed to David des Granges. Currently at Kilkenny Castle Collections.
- Born: Elizabeth Preston; 25 July 1615
- Died: 21 July 1684 (aged 68); London
- Family: Butler dynasty
- Spouse: James Butler, 1st Duke of Ormond
- Issue Detail: Thomas, Richard, Elizabeth, John & others
- Father: Richard, 1st Earl of Desmond
- Mother: Elizabeth Butler

Elizabeth Butler, Duchess of Ormond and 2nd Baroness Dingwall (née Preston; 25 July 1615 – 21 July 1684) reunited the Ormond estate as her maternal grandfather, Black Tom, 10th Earl of Ormond had it, by marrying James Butler, later Duke of Ormond, her second cousin once removed. She had inherited her share of the Ormond estate through her mother, Elizabeth Preston, who was Black Tom's daughter and only surviving child. Her husband had inherited his share from his grandfather Walter Butler, 11th Earl of Ormond, Black Tom's successor in the earldom. Her share was the bigger one and included Kilkenny Castle.

== Birth and origins ==
Family tree

Elizabeth Preston with husband, parents, and other selected relatives. (Note: This family tree is partly derived from the condensed Butler family tree pictured in Dunboyne. Also see the lists of siblings and children in the text.)

James; 9th Earl; 1496–1546	Joan; FitzGerald d. 1565
Thomas; 10th Earl c. 1531 – 1614; Black Tom	Elizabeth; Sheffield d. 1600	Edmund of Cloughgrenan; 1534–1602	John of Kilcash d. 1570
Theobald; Viscount; Tulleophelim d. 1613	Elizabeth; Butler c. 1585 – 1628	Richard; Preston; 1st Earl; Desmond d. 1628	Walter; 11th Earl; 1559 – 1633 'Beads'	Helen; Butler d. 1631
Thomas; Viscount; Thurles d. 1619 d.v.p.*	Elizabeth; Pointz; 1587–1673
Elizabeth; Preston; 1615–1684	James; 1st Duke; 1610–1688	Richard of Kilcash; 1615–1701
Thomas; 6th Earl; Ossory; 1633–1680 d.v.p.*	Emilia von Nassau; 1635–1688	Richard; 1st Earl; Arran; 1639–1684	Elizabeth; Countess of Chesterfield; 1640–1665	Walter of Garryricken d. 1700 d.v.p.*
James; 2nd Duke; Ormond; 1665–1745	Charles; 1st Earl; Arran; 1671–1758	Elizabeth; Butler d. 1717	Henrietta; Butler d. 1724	Thomas of Garryricken d. 1738
John de jure 15th Earl d. 1766

Legend

XXX	Subject of the article	XXX	Earls & dukes of Ormond

*d.v.p. = predeceased his father (decessit vita patris).

Elizabeth Preston was born on 25 July 1615. She was the only child of Richard Preston and Elizabeth Butler. Her father was a younger son of the Prestons of Whitehill, Scottish gentry of the Edinburgh area. He was a page at the Scottish court and became a favourite of James VI of Scotland, who made him a groom of his bedchamber and ennobled him by creating him Lord Dingwall in 1609.

Elizabeth's mother was the only surviving child of Thomas Butler, 10th Earl of Ormond, called Black Tom. She had been married before to her first cousin Theobald Butler, 1st Viscount Butler of Tulleophelim, who had died childless in 1613. Her family was Old English and descended from Theobald Walter, who had been appointed Chief Butler of Ireland by King Henry II in 1177.

Elizabeth's parents were both Protestant. They had married in 1614, not long before her maternal grandfather's death on 22 November 1614.

== Black Tom's succession and inheritance ==
Elizabeth Preston's parents lives were overshadowed by the problems of Elizabeth's maternal grandfather's succession and inheritance. Black Tom, had settled most of his estate on his male heir, his nephew Walter, who succeeded him as Earl of Ormond in 1614, according to the normal rules of succession of his title. However, Black Tom was a Protestant, whereas his nephew Walter, called "of the rosary beads", was a devout Catholic. King James I considered this a setback for his Irish politics. He intervened to keep the Ormond lands in Protestant hands. He decided that most of the estate should go to Black Tom's only child, Elizabeth. The King furthermore ordained that this daughter should marry his favourite Richard Preston, 1st Lord Dingwall, a Scottish Protestant. Accordingly, Elizabeth's parents married in 1614.

== Father's succession ==
Elizabeth was an only child. Her mother was about 30 at her birth and Elizabeth was her first child. Her father was about 35. He had married late and was a former favourite of James I. Very soon her potential to become a rich heiress was recognised and marriage plans were made. Marquess of Buckingham wanted to marry Elizabeth, aged 3, to his nephew George Feilding.

The ancient Anglo-Irish family of the Earls of Desmond - from which Elizabeth was in part descended through her mother - had rebelled against the English crown and been stripped of that title in the 1580s. In 1619 Buckingham arranged that the King advance Elizabeth's father Richard to Earl of Desmond. In 1622 the King further confirmed George Feilding as having the right to the title on Richard Preston's death, as Richard had no male heir and Feilding was expected to marry Elizabeth.

In 1628 Elizabeth Preston, aged 13, became a rich heiress when both her parents died in quick succession. First, on 10 October, her mother died in Wales and was buried in Westminster Abbey, then on 28 October her father drowned during a passage between Dublin and Holyhead. His title as Earl of Desmond passed to George Feilding, but Elizabeth inherited his Scottish title of Lord Dingwall to become Baroness Dingwall suo jure as the title had been created for her father with remainder to heirs and assigns whatsoever. As the only child, Elizabeth inherited all her parents' part of the Ormond estate, which included Kilkenny Castle and the County Palatine of Tipperary. As she was a minor, she became a ward of the crown. Henry Rich, 1st Earl of Holland (1590–1649) was appointed her guardian.

== Marriage and children ==
At Christmas 1629, aged 14, she married her second cousin once removed, James Butler. Their common ancestor was James Butler, 9th Earl of Ormond, who was her great grandfather and his great-great grandfather (see Family tree). The marriage made her Viscountess Thurles as he was at the time styled Viscount Thurles, which was the courtesy title of the heir apparent of the earls of Ormond. In 1630 the couple went to live at Carrick-on-Suir.

Elizabeth and James had at least ten children, but only five survived into adulthood:

1. Thomas (1634–1680), predeceased his father, but had a son who would become the 2nd Duke
2. Richard (1639–1686), became the first and last Earl of Arran of the 1662 creation and predeceased his father
3. Elizabeth (1640–1665), married Philip Stanhope, 2nd Earl of Chesterfield and had affairs with James Hamilton and the Duke of York
4. John (1643–1677), became the Earl of Gowran
5. Mary (1646–1710), married William Cavendish, 1st Duke of Devonshire

As a consequence of the marriage, the Ormond estate was reunited as her grandfather, the 10th Earl, had owned it. Elizabeth and James went to live in Kilkenny Castle, while her grandfather-in-law, the 11th Earl resided at Ormonde Castle at Carrick-on-Suir where he died on 24 February 1633. Elizabeth became Countess of Ormond as her husband succeeded to the earldom. In 1634 her eldest son, Thomas was born in Kilkenny Castle.

== Irish wars ==
On the outbreak of the Irish Rebellion of 1641, while her husband took command of the king's army in Dublin, she was living at Carrick-on-Suir where she was soon surrounded by the insurgents. She later moved to Kilkenny Castle and continued to stay there even when Kilkenny became the capital of the Catholic Confederation. She sheltered Protestant refugees and kept them in the castle.

She became Marchioness of Ormond on her husband's promotion on 30 August 1642. In that same year she was allowed to rejoin her husband in Dublin. Their last two children, John and Mary, were born in Dublin while they stayed there together. In the city she continued to help refugees. When the city appeared to be menaced by a siege by the Confederates after Owen Roe O'Neill's victory in the Battle of Benburb in June 1646, she also helped to reinforce Dublin's defences.

She accompanied her husband to England in 1647 after he surrendered Dublin to the parliamentary forces. As in 1648 he renewed his support for the royalist cause, Lady Ormond moved to Caen, France, where she arrived on 23 June 1648 with all her five children. From September 1648 to December 1650 her husband was again in Ireland where he tried to reunite the Irish in the fight against the Parliamentarians. The family was short of money. In 1652, Lady Ormond and her children returned to England in August 1652 to plead with Cromwell for income from the land she owned. She managed to obtain a pension of £2000 per year under the condition that she would not correspond with her husband.

In 1653 while in Dublin she helped her husband's brother-in-law, the Viscount Muskerry who stood accused of the murder of Protestant refugees in 1642. They went to see Chief Justice Lowther who gave her legal advice for Muskerry. This helped him to convince the court of his innocence and he was acquitted.

In 1655 she returned to Ireland accompanied by her younger children and lived at her home in Dunmore, County Kilkenny.

== Restoration, later life, death, and timeline ==
Following the restoration of Charles II, Lady Ormond sent her husband political information from Ireland, and the couple were later reunited in England. In March 1661 she became Duchess of Ormond as her husband was made a duke. In 1662 she became Vicereine of Ireland as her husband was appointed lord lieutenant of Ireland, serving until 1669 and again from 1677 to 1685. Lady Ormond hosted entertainment and spent lavishly on restoring and improving the family estates, but her personal correspondence reveals that she was concerned about the debts of her husband and sons. Her eldest son Thomas Butler, 6th Earl of Ossory, suddenly died in 1680. Her health began to decline in 1681, and she died in London on 21 July 1684. She was buried at Westminster Abbey on 24 July.

Timeline
Age	Date	Event
0	25 Jul 1615	Born.
3	19 Jul 1619	Father created Earl of Desmond in Ireland.
9	27 Mar 1625	Accession of King Charles I, succeeding King James I
13	10 Oct 1628	Mother died in Wales.
13	28 Oct 1628	Father drowned during a passage between Dublin and Holyhead.
14	25 Dec 1629	Married James Butler.
14–15	1630	Went to live at the Ormond Castle at Carrick with her husband
17	24 Feb 1633	Became Countess of Ormond as her husband succeeded as the 12th Earl
23	5 Jul 1634	Birth at Kilkenny Castle of her eldest son, Thomas
23	15 Jul 1639	Birth of her second son, Richard
24	29 Jun 1640	Birth of her elder daughter, Elizabeth
27	30 Aug 1642	Became Marchioness of Ormond as her husband was created Marquess.
27–28	1643	Birth of her youngest son, John
30	5 Jun 1646	The confederates win the Battle of Benburb.
30–31	1646	Birth of her youngest daughter, Mary
31–32	1647	The Ormonds leave Dublin and go to England.
32	23 Jun 1648	Arrived at Caen, France, with her children.
33	29 Sep 1648	Husband went to Ireland arriving at Cork on 29 September.
33	30 Jan 1649	King Charles I beheaded.
35	11 Dec 1650	Husband left Ireland and rejoined her in France.
37	August 1652	Returned to England with her children and asked Cromwell for money.
39–40	1655	Returned to Ireland with her younger children.
44	29 May 1660	Restoration of King Charles II
45	30 Mar 1661	Became Duchesse of Ormond as her husband was created Duke.
46–47	1662	Became Vicereine of Ireland as her husband became Lord Lieutenant of Ireland.
65	30 Jul 1680	Son Thomas, Earl of Ossory, died.
68	21 Jul 1684	Died in London.

== Notes and references ==
=== Sources ===
- Airy, Osmund (1886). "Butler, James, twelfth Earl and first Duke of Ormonde (1610–1688)". In Lee, Sidney (ed.). Dictionary of National Biography. Vol. VIII. New York: MacMillan and Co. pp. 52–60. OCLC 8544105.
- Burghclere, Winifred Anne Henrietta Christina Herbert Gardner, Baroness (1912). Life of James, first Duke of Ormonde, 1610–1688. London: J. Murray. OCLC 1048334435.
- Burke, Bernard; Burke, Ashworth Peter (1915). A Genealogical and Heraldic History of the Peerage and Baronetage, the Privy Council, Knightage and Companionage (77th ed.). London: Harrison. OCLC 1155471554.
- Carte, Thomas (1851) [1st pub. 1736]. The Life of James Duke of Ormond. Vol. III (New ed.). Oxford: Oxford University Press. OCLC 1086656347. – 1643 to 1660
- Chester, Joseph Lemuel (1876). Registers of Westminster Abbey. London: Private Edition. OCLC 1140248. – Marriages, baptisms and burials from about 1660 to 1875
- Cokayne, George Edward (1890). Complete Peerage of England, Scotland, Ireland, Great Britain and the United Kingdom, Extant, Extinct, or Dormant. Vol. III (1st ed.). London: George Bell and Sons. OCLC 1180838776. – D to F (for Desmond & Dingwall)
- Cokayne, George Edward (1895). Complete Peerage of England, Scotland, Ireland, Great Britain and the United Kingdom, Extant, Extinct, or Dormant. Vol. VI (1st ed.). London: George Bell and Sons. OCLC 1180818801. – N to R (for Ormond)
- Crawfurd, George (1716). The Peerage of Scotland: Containing an Historical and Genealogical Account of the Nobility of that Kingdom. Edinburgh: Printed for the author. OCLC 510662768.
- Davies, J. D. (2004). "Butler, Thomas, sixth earl of Ossory (1634–1680)". In Matthew, Henry Colin Gray.; Harrison, Brian (eds.). Oxford Dictionary of National Biography. Vol. 9. New York: Oxford University Press. pp. 226–229. ISBN 0-19-861359-8.
- Debrett, John (1828). Peerage of the United Kingdom of Great Britain and Ireland. Vol. I (17th ed.). London: F. C. and J. Rivington. OCLC 54499602. – England
- Duffy, Seán (2002). The Illustrated History of Ireland. New York: Contemporary Books. ISBN 0-8092-2437-2.
- Dunboyne, Patrick Theobald Tower Butler, Baron (1968). Butler Family History (2nd ed.). Kilkenny: Rothe House.
- Firth, Charles Harding (1894) [1st pub. 1698]. The Memoirs of Edmund Ludlow Lieutenant-General of the Horse in the Army of the Commonwealth of England 1625–1672. Vol. I. Oxford: Clarendon Press. OCLC 1113948779. – 1625 to 1655
- Fryde, Edmund Boleslaw; Greenway, D. E.; Porter, S.; Roy, I., eds. (1986). Handbook of British Chronology. Royal Historical Society Guides and Handbooks, No. 2 (3rd ed.). London: Offices of the Royal Historical Society. ISBN 0-86193-106-8. – (for timeline)
- Hamilton, Anthony (1888). Memoirs of Count Grammont. Translated by Walpole, Horace. Philadelphia: Gebbie & Co. OCLC 1048777116.
- Mountmorres, Hervey Redmond Morres, Viscount (1792). The History of the Principal Transactions of the Irish Parliament from the Year 1634 to 1666. Vol. I. London: T. Cadell. OCLC 843863159. – House of Lords
- O'Sullivan, Mary Donovan (1983) [1st pub. 1942]. Old Galloway: the history of a Norman colony in Ireland. Galway: Kennys Bookshops and Art Galleries. ISBN 978-0-906312-21-6.
- Paul, Sir James Balfour (1906). The Scots Peerage, Founded on Wood's Edition of Sir Robert Douglas's Peerage of Scotland. Vol. III. Edinburgh: David Douglas. OCLC 505064285. – Crawford to Falkland (for Dingwall)
- Pepys, Samuel (1893). Wheatley, Henry Benjamin (ed.). The Diary of Samuel Pepys. Vol. II. London: George Bell and Sons. OCLC 503692830. – 1 April 1661 to 31 December 1662
- Perceval-Maxwell, Michael (2004). "Butler [née Preston] Elizabeth, duchess of Ormond and suo jure Lady Dingwall (1615–1684)". In Matthew, Henry Colin Gray.; Harrison, Brian (eds.). Oxford Dictionary of National Biography. Vol. 9. New York: Oxford University Press. pp. 130–131. ISBN 0-19-861359-8.
- Sergeant, Philip Walsingham (1913). Little Jennings and Fighting Dick Talbot: A Life of the Duke and Duchess of Tyrconnel. Vol. I. London: Hutchinson. OCLC 474495830. – 1643 to 1685
