= John Butler of Kilcash =

Irish landowner and soldier (died 1570)

John Butler
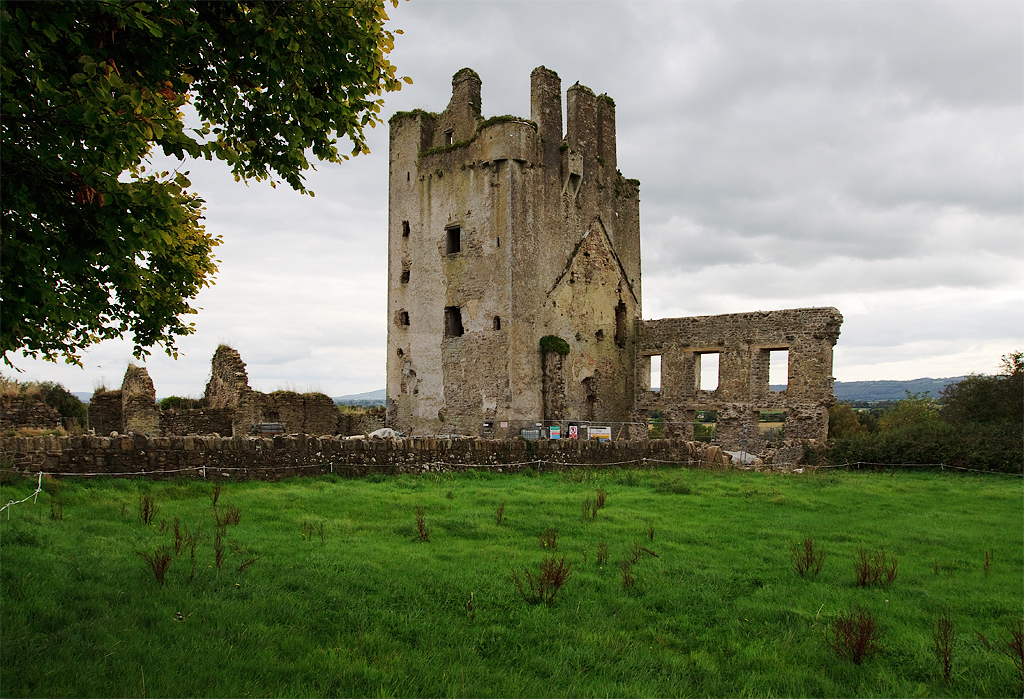
- Ruin of Kilcash Castle
- Died: 10 May 1570
- Family: Butler dynasty
- Spouse: Katherine MacCarthy Reagh
- Issue Detail: Walter & others
- Father: James Butler, 9th Earl of Ormond
- Mother: Joan FitzGerald, Countess of Ormond

John Butler of Kilcash (died 1570) was an Irish landowner and soldier. A younger son of James Butler, 9th Earl of Ormond and brother of Thomas Butler, 10th Earl of Ormond, he received Kilcash Castle as appanage. He fought in the Desmond–Ormond conflict and was badly wounded in 1563, just before the Battle of Affane. He was the start-point of the Kilcash branch of the Ormonds and the father of Walter Butler, 11th Earl of Ormond.

== Birth and origins ==
John was born about 1537 (Note: John's year of birth is bracketed between 1534, the birth of his older brother, and the death of his father in 1544, minus two gestations of his younger brothers James, Edward and Piers. 1537 seems a good estimate.) in southern Ireland. He was the third son of James Butler and his wife Joan Fitzgerald. His father was the 9th Earl of Ormond. His father's family, the Butler dynasty, was Old English and descended from Theobald Walter, who had been appointed Chief Butler of Ireland by King Henry II in 1177.

His mother was a daughter of James FitzGerald, 10th Earl of Desmond. Her family were the FitzGeralds of Desmond, a cadet branch of the Old English Geraldines, whose senior branch were the FitzGeralds of Kildare. John had six brothers, which are listed in his father's article.

Family tree

John Butler with wife, parents, and other selected relatives. (Note: This family tree is partly based on the condensed Butler family tree pictured in Dunboyne and on genealogies of the Earls of Desmond and Ormond. Also see the lists of siblings and children in the text.)

Piers; 8th Earl; 1467–1539	Margaret; FitzGerald c. 1473 – 1542	James; FitzGerald; 10th Earl d. 1529	Amy; O'Brien
James; 9th Earl; 1496–1546	Joan; FitzGerald d. 1565	Gerald; 14th Earl c. 1533 – 1583; Rebel Earl	Cormac; 13th Carbery; 1490–1567
Thomas; 10th Earl c. 1531 – 1614; Black Tom	Elizabeth; Sheffield d. 1600	Edmund of Cloughgrenan; 1534–1602	John of Kilcash d. 1570	Katherine; MacCarthy; Reagh
Elizabeth; Butler c. 1585 – 1628	Richard; Preston; 1st Earl; Desmond d. 1628	Walter; 11th Earl; 1559–1633 'Beads'	Helen; Butler d. 1631
Thomas; Viscount; Thurles d. 1619 d.v.p.*	Elizabeth; Pointz; 1587–1673
Elizabeth; Preston; 1615–1684	James; 1st Duke; 1610–1688	Richard of Kilcash; 1615–1701

Legend

XXX	Subject of the article	XXX	Earls & dukes of Ormond	XXX	Earls of Desmond

*d.v.p. = predeceased his father (decessit vita patris).

== Appanage and father's death ==
On 26 May 1544 when he was still a little boy, his father, the 9th Earl of Ormond, granted him Kilcash as an appanage as is attested by his territorial designation of Kilcash. The existing tower house at Kilcash was probably built at that time.

Well he did so. Because only a bit more than a year later, on 28 October 1546, when John was about six, his father suddenly died in London having been poisoned during a banquet at Ely House, probably at the instigation of Anthony St Leger, who was Lord Deputy of Ireland and a political opponent. John's eldest brother Thomas succeeded as the 10th Earl.

== Marriage and children ==
John Butler of Kilcash married Katherine MacCarthy Reagh, the daughter of Cormac na Haoine MacCarthy Reagh, 10th Prince of Carbery and sister of Donal, later known as Donal of the Pipes, 17th Prince of Carbery.

John and Katherine had four children, two sons:

1. James Butler, died childless before September 1576;
2. Walter Butler, 11th Earl of Ormond (1559–1633), known as "Walter of the Beads".

—and two daughters;

1. Joan, married Sir Oliver Shortall, knight.
2. Eleanor, married Thomas Prendergast; their son James Prendergast was killed in 1627 by Edmond Butler, 3rd/13th Baron Dunboyne;

== Desmond – Ormond conflict ==
Much of Kilcash's life was taken up with a fierce feud his family had with the Earls of Desmond. The Desmonds were the Ormonds' neighbours on the western and southern sides. Despite their enmity, these two families were both more or less Gaelicized Old English and had intermarried many times; the last such marriage having been that of Kilcash's parents as his mother was a Desmond FitzGerald. The Desmond wars should also be seen in the wider picture of the Tudor conquest of Ireland. In 1560 his mother's intervention secured a peaceful outcome to a stand-off at Bohermore (known as "the battle that never was").

In 1563 Kilcash was badly wounded in a fight with the Desmonds and his recovery was deemed uncertain. He was unable to participate in the private Battle of Affane, which was fought on 8 February 1565, only a bit more than a month after his mother's death. His stepfather, Gerald FitzGerald, 14th Earl of Desmond was taken prisoner in the battle after Kilcash's brother Edmund had shot him into the hip with his pistol. Lord Ormond (his eldest brother) and Lord Desmond were called to London and promised to keep the peace.

== Desmond Rebellions ==
Kilcash could of course also not fight to suppress the Desmond Rebellions that were started in 1569 by James fitz Maurice FitzGerald, captain of the Desmond forces in the earl's absence. The captain was supported by many Irish in southern Ireland but also by some of Butler's brothers, notably Edmund. The rebellion was directed against Henry Sidney the Lord Deputy of Ireland. Kilcash's brother Thomas, Lord Ormond returned to Ireland landing at Waterford in July 1569 whereupon his brothers submitted quickly.

However, Edmund, Edward and Piers were attainted in April 1570 by an act of the Irish Parliament. That meant that Edmund ceased to be Ormond's heir presumptive and John, the next brother, took his place but only for about a month as he died on 10 May 1570. John's eldest son, Walter, thereafter became heir presumptive. James fitz Maurice FitzGerald surrendered on 23 February 1573 and Gerald followed in September ending the first Desmond rebellion.

== Death and timeline ==
John Butler died on 10 May 1570 at Kilcash and was buried in Kilkenny.

Timeline
As his birth date is uncertain, so are all his ages.
Age	Date	Event
0	1540, estimate	Born
6–7	1544, 26 May	Father gave him Kilcash as appanage.
8–9	1546, 28 Oct	Father died poisoned in London
9–10	1547, 28 Jan	Accession of Edward VI, succeeding Henry VIII
15–16	1553, 6 Jul	Accession of Mary I, succeeding Edward VI
20–21	1558, 17 Nov	Accession of Elizabeth I, succeeding Mary I
25–26	1563	Badly wounded in a fight with the Geraldines.
27–28	1565, 2 Jan	Mother died
27–28	1565, 8 Feb	Battle of Affane
31–32	1569	Outbreak of the 1st Desmond Rebellion
32–33	1570, April	Brothers Edmund, Edward and Piers attainted
76–77	1570, 10 May	Died at Kilcash.

== Notes and references ==
=== Sources ===
- Breffny, Brian de (1977). Castles of Ireland. London: Thames and Hudson. ISBN 978-0-5002-7398-2.
- Burke, Bernard (1883). A Genealogical History of the Dormant, Abeyant, Forfeited and Extinct Peerages of the British Empire (New ed.). London: Harrison. OCLC 499232768. (for Desmond)
- Burke, Bernard; Burke, Ashworth Peter (1915). A Genealogical and Heraldic History of the Peerage and Baronetage, the Privy Council, Knightage and Companionage (77th ed.). London: Harrison. OCLC 1155471554.
- Butler, William F. T. (1929). "The Descendants of James, Ninth Earl of Ormond". The Journal of the Royal Society of Antiquaries of Ireland. 6th. 19 (1): 29–44. JSTOR 25513504.
- Cokayne, George Edward (1895). Complete Peerage of England, Scotland, Ireland, Great Britain and the United Kingdom, Extant, Extinct, or Dormant. Vol. VI (1st ed.). London: George Bell and Sons. OCLC 1180818801. – N to R (for Ormond)
- Debrett, John (1828). Peerage of the United Kingdom of Great Britain and Ireland. Vol. II (17th ed.). London: F. C. and J. Rivington. OCLC 54499602. – Scotland and Ireland
- Dunboyne, Patrick Theobald Tower Butler, Baron (1968). Butler Family History (2nd ed.). Kilkenny: Rothe House.
- Edwards, David (2004). "Butler, Walter, eleventh earl of Ormond and fourth Earl of Ossory (1559–1633)". In Matthew, Henry Colin Gray; Harrison, Brian (eds.). Oxford Dictionary of National Biography. Vol. 9. New York: Oxford University Press. pp. 230–231. ISBN 0-19-861359-8.
- Fryde, Edmund Boleslaw; Greenway, D. E.; Porter, S.; Roy, I., eds. (1986). Handbook of British Chronology. Royal Historical Society Guides and Handbooks, No. 2 (3rd ed.). London: Offices of the Royal Historical Society. ISBN 0-86193-106-8. – (for timeline)
- Joyce, Patrick Weston (1903). A Concise History of Ireland from the Earliest Times to 1837 (12th ed.). Dublin: M. H. Gill & Son. OCLC 815623752.
- Lainé, P. Louis (1836). "Mac-Carthy". Archives généalogiques et historiques de la noblesse de France [Genealogical and Historical Archives of the Nobility of France] (in French). Vol. Tome cinquième. Paris: Imprimerie de Bethune et Plon. pp. 1–102. OCLC 865941166.
- Lee, Sidney (1886). "Butler, Thomas, tenth Earl of Ormonde (1532–1614)". In Lee, Sidney (ed.). Dictionary of National Biography. Vol. VIII. New York: MacMillan and Co. pp. 79–81. OCLC 8544105.
- Lodge, John (1789a). Archdall, Mervyn (ed.). The Peerage of Ireland or, A Genealogical History of the Present Nobility of that Kingdom. Vol. V. Dublin: James Moore. OCLC 264906028. – Viscounts (for Viscount Mountgarret)
- Lodge, John (1789b). Archdall, Mervyn (ed.). The Peerage of Ireland or, A Genealogical History of the Present Nobility of that Kingdom. Vol. VI. Dublin: James Moore. OCLC 264906028. – Viscounts, barons (for "Butler, Lord Cahier" — Dunboyne)
- McGurk, J. J. N. (2004). "FitzGerald, Gerald fitz James, fourteenth earl of Desmond (c. 1533–1583)". In Matthew, Colin; Harrison, Brian (eds.). Oxford Dictionary of National Biography. Vol. 19. New York: Oxford University Press. pp. 809–811. ISBN 0-19-861369-5. – 14th Earl of Desmond
- Somerset Fry, Plantagenet (1997). Castles of Britain and Ireland : the ultimate reference book : a region-by-region guide to over 1,350 castles. New York: Abbeville Press Publishers. ISBN 0-7892-0278-6. OCLC 36308898.
