= Affane =

Village in County Waterford, Ireland

Affane Áth Mheáin
- Village
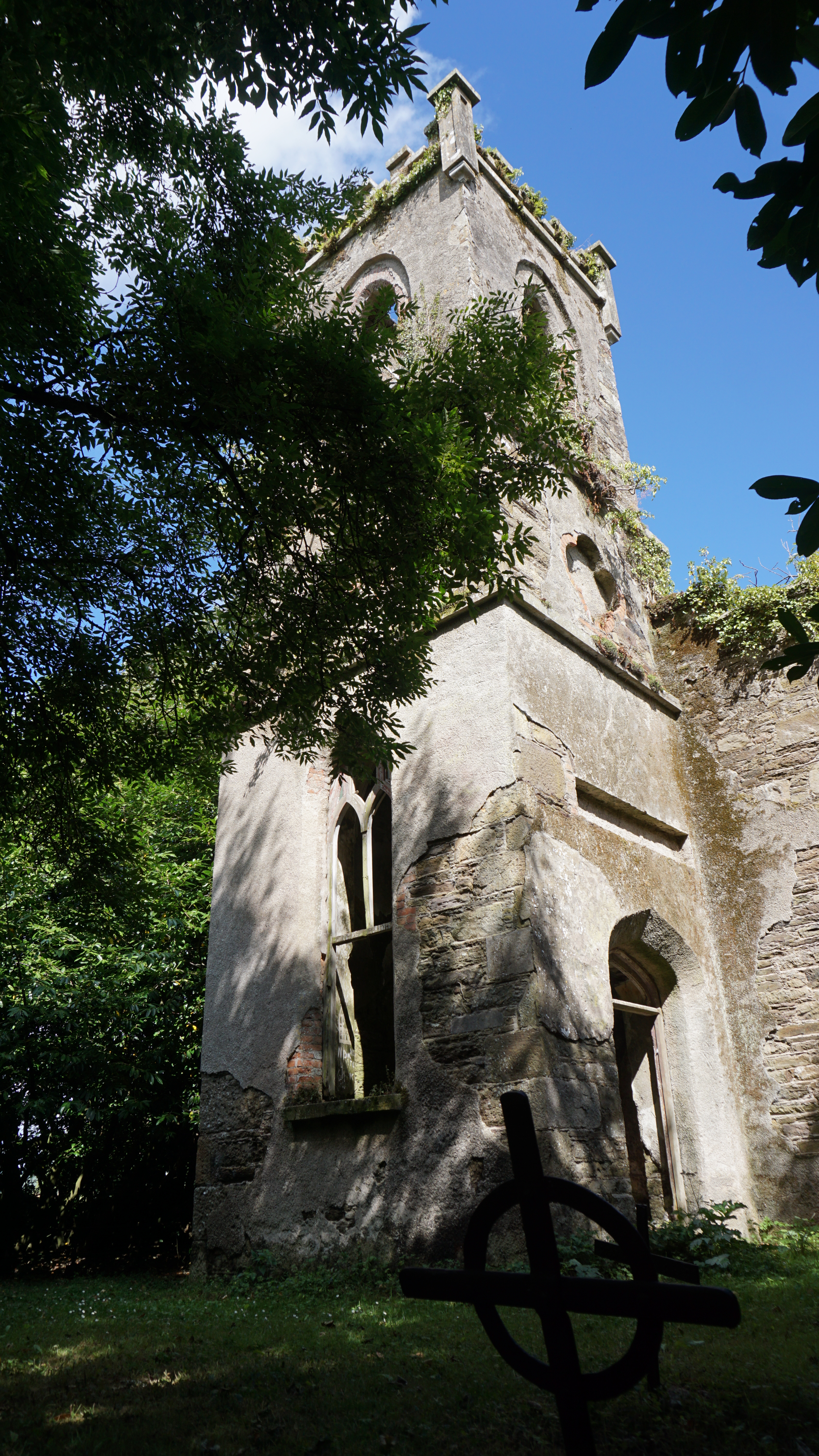
- Affane Church

- Location in Ireland
- Coordinates: 52°07′29″N 7°50′16″W
- Country: Ireland
- Province: Munster
- County: County Waterford
- Time zone: UTC+0 (WET)
  - Summer (DST): UTC-1 (IST (WEST))

Affane (Irish: Áth Mheáin, meaning 'central ford') is a small village in west County Waterford, Ireland, situated near Cappoquin and the River Blackwater. The village is in a civil parish of the same name.

== History ==
References to the town of Affane are limited to its inclusion in a 1300 list and an incidient in 1312, though the existence of a Church and castle 300m apart suggest a medival settlement.. The Battle of Affane between the Desmond and Ormonde factions was fought in the area in 1565.

The ruins of a Church of Ireland church are located within a graveyard. The parish church of Affane, listed as Athmethan and valued at over £6 in the ecclesiastical taxation (1302-1306) was located south of the ruins. By the mid 16th century it had been united with the church of Dungarvan, but in a visitation of 1588 it was in the Deanery of Ardmore.

== Sport ==
The local Gaelic Athletic Association club is Affane Cappoquin GAA. In 1974, Affane won its only Waterford Senior Football Championship, defeating Dunhill by 1-8 to 0-6, before losing to Austin Stacks in the Munster Senior Club Football Championship.

== See also ==
- Battle of Affane
- Gerald Fitzgerald, 14th Earl of Desmond
- Thomas Butler, 10th Earl of Ormonde
- List of towns and villages in Ireland
