= Sir Richard Butler, 7th Baronet =

Irish politician

Sir Richard Butler, 7th Baronet (14 July 1761 – 16 January 1817) was an Anglo-Irish politician.

He was the eldest son of Sir Thomas Butler, 6th Baronet and his wife Dorothea Bayly, daughter of Very Rev. Edward Bayly, Archdeacon of Dublin. In 1772, he succeeded his father as baronet. He was appointed High Sheriff of Carlow for 1784.

Butler sat for County Carlow in the Irish House of Commons from 1783 until 1790 and again from 1796 until the Act of Union in 1801. Subsequently, he represented County Carlow in the Parliament of the United Kingdom until the 1802 general election.

On 23 August 1782, Butler married Sarah Maria Newenham, only daughter of Thomas Worth Newenham. They had at least a daughter and three sons. His grandson, William C. Butler (1844–1914) played football for England against a Scottish XI in two unofficial internationals in 1870 and 1871.

Butler died, aged 55 and was succeeded by his eldest son Thomas.

Parliament of Ireland
Preceded by Beauchamp Bagenal; William Henry Burton	Member of Parliament for County Carlow; 1783 – 1790; With: William Henry Burton	Succeeded by Henry Bruen; William Henry Burton
Preceded by Henry Bruen; William Henry Burton	Member of Parliament for County Carlow; 1796 – 1801; With: William Henry Burton	Succeeded by Parliament of the United Kingdom
Parliament of the United Kingdom
New constituency	Member of Parliament for County Carlow; 1801 – 1802; With: William Henry Burton	Succeeded by David Latouche; Walter Bagenal
Baronetage of Ireland
Preceded by Thomas Butler	Baronet (of Cloughgrenan); 1772 – 1817	Succeeded by Thomas Butler
