= Beauchamp Bagenal =

Irish politician (1741–1802)

Beauchamp Bagenal (1741 – 1 May 1802) was an Irish duelist, and politician. He was described as a rake, and a buck.

He was born in County Carlow in 1741, son of Walter Bagenal, and his second wife Eleanor Beauchamp, and inherited the family estates aged 11. Bagenal gained a reputation as a hell-raiser and serial heartbreaker, and was reportedly described as the handsomest man in Ireland. According to Jonah Barrington, on his Grand Tour, Bagenal:

fought a prince, jilted a princess, intoxicated the Doge of Venice, carried off a duchess from Madrid, scaled the walls of a convent in Lisbon and fought a duel in Paris,

The jilted Princess referred to above was Charlotte of Mecklenburg-Strelitz, afterwards married to George III of Great Britain.

At his home, Dunleckney, Bagenalstown, County Carlow, he earned the nickname "King" Bagenal based on his lavish entertaining and the autocratic manner with which he ran what was virtually a court. Meals were "primarily drinking bouts. At table, he kept a brace of duelling pistols handy, one for tapping the barrel of claret, the other for dealing with any of his guests who failed to drink enough to send him reeling from the table. Dinner was followed by compulsory all night revels."

Bagenal was less violent than his later reputation. There is no proof that he shot all, or even many, of his guests. He fought as few as a dozen duels, a derisory number compared to the great duellists of his day. One of the twelve was against his own cousin, Bagenal Harvey. Harvey fired first, but missed, to Bagenal's delight. "You damn you villain? Do you know you had like to kill your own godfather? Go back to Dunleckney, you dog, and have a good breakfast ready for us. I only wanted to see if you were stout."

A number of other anecdotes of Bagenal's wildness and eccentricity exist online.

Bagenal was lame, and therefore, when fighting had to lean against a tombstone. He represented Enniscorthy in the Irish House of Commons from 1761 to 1768. He sat then as Member of Parliament (MP) for County Carlow between 1768 and 1776 and again between 1778 and 1783.

By his wife Maria, he had three children; he had at least one illegitimate child, Sarah.

Parliament of Ireland
Preceded by Anderson Saunders; Hon. Thomas George Southwell	Member of Parliament for Enniscorthy; 1761–1768; Served alongside: John Grogan 1761–1768; Cornelius Grogan 1768–1769	Succeeded by Sir Edward Newenham; Cornelius Grogan
Preceded by John Hyde; Thomas Butler	Member of Parliament for County Carlow; 1768–1776; Served alongside: William Henry Burton	Succeeded by William Bunbury; William Henry Burton
Preceded by William Bunbury; William Henry Burton	Member of Parliament for County Carlow; 1778–1783; Served alongside: William Henry Burton	Succeeded by Sir Richard Butler, 7th Bt; William Henry Burton
