= Sir Thomas Butler, 1st Baronet =

Irish noble

The Right Honourable Sir Thomas Butler
- Baronet of Cloughgrenan
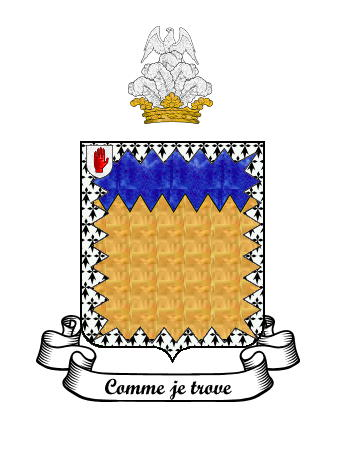
- Coat of arms
- Tenure: 1628–1642
- Predecessor: New creation
- Successor: Sir Edmund Butler, 2nd Baronet
- Born: c. 1578
- Died: 1642 (aged 63–64)
- Spouse: Anne Colclough
- Issue: Sir Edmund Butler, 2nd Baronet
- Father: Sir Edmund Butler of Cloughgrenan
- Mother: Sadhbh

Sir Thomas Butler, 1st Baronet of Cloughgrenan (c. 1578 – 1642), was an Irish nobleman.

== Early life ==
He was the illegitimate son of Sir Edmund Butler of Cloughgrenan (1534–c. 1585) and grandson of James Butler, 9th Earl of Ormond and 2nd Earl of Ossory (c. 1496–1546). His father had three other legitimate sons with his wife, Eleanor Eustace, the second daughter of Rowland Eustace, 2nd Viscount Baltinglass: Pierce, James and Theobald. The two elder sons (Sir Thomas's half-brothers) were executed by their own uncle, Thomas Butler, 10th Earl of Ormond (c.1531-1614), at Thurles, Ireland, during their rebellion in 1596. The third son, Theobald, was created Viscount Butler of Tulleophelim.

=== Circumstances of birth ===
In 1569, his father led the Butler Revolt in direct response to the Lord Deputy of Ireland, Sir Henry Sidney, who unjustly granted Sir Edmund's lands in Idrone, Carlow, to the English adventurer Sir Peter Carew. Sir Edmund's behaviour landed him in the gaol at the Dublin Castle, from which he then escaped. The escape was completed with the help of Fiach McHugh O'Byrne (1534-1597), Lord of Ranelagh and leader of the Clann Uí Bhroin, after which Sir Edmund made his way to Glenmalure.

According to Emmett O’Byrne's entry on Fiach MacHugh O'Byrne in The Dictionary of Irish Biography, Sir Edmund remained at Glenmalure for some time, during which he had an affair with Fiach's first wife Sadhbh, resulting in her divorce from Fiach, "her later marriage to Butler, and considerable enmity between the two men". Sadhbh was a daughter of Donall McCahir, chief of the sept of the Kavanaghs (Caomhánach) of Garryhill, and a great-great-granddaughter of Murrough Ballach Kavanagh, late 15th-century King of Leinster. Emmett O'Byrne believes Sadhbh bore Sir Edmund a son, Thomas, who became the 1st Baronet of Cloughgrenan.

== Career ==
Sir Thomas served as High Sheriff of Carlow for 1612 and 1622. On 16 August 1628, he was created a Baronet of Cloughgrenan (a townland near Carlow, Ireland) by King Charles I (1600–1649). He was a Member of Parliament for County Carlow in the Irish House of Commons between 1634 and 1635, and again from 1639 until his death in 1642.

== Personal life ==
Sir Thomas married Anne Bagenal (née Colclough), daughter of Sir Thomas Colclough, with issue:

- Sir Edmund Butler, 2nd Baronet of Cloughgrenan (died before 1653).

Sir Thomas died in 1642 and was succeeded in the baronetcy by his son, Edmund.

=== Descendants ===
The Cloughgrenan lineage survives to the present day through the line of the Butler Baronets, Sir Richard Pierce Butler, 13th Baronet (b. 1940), and his heir apparent Thomas Pierce Butler (b. 1966), as well as through his younger cousin, James Richard Henry Ormonde Brooke (b. 1972) (great-great-grandson of Captain William C. Butler (1844-1914)), who were all educated at Eton.

Pierce Butler (1744-1822), one of the Founding Fathers of the United States, was the third son of Sir Richard Butler, 5th Baronet of Cloughgrenan (1699–1771), thus being a direct descendant of Sir Thomas Butler, 1st Baronet.

The current family seat is the Ballintemple estate in County Carlow, Ireland.

== See also ==
- List of baronetcies in the Baronetage of Ireland
- Butler baronets
- Butler dynasty

Parliament of Ireland
Preceded by Sir Morgan Cavanagh; George Bagenal	Member of Parliament for County Carlow; 1634–1635; 1639–1642; With: James Butler (1634–1635); Oliver Eustace (1639–1642)	Succeeded by Sir Thomas Harman
Baronetage of Ireland
New creation	Baronet (of Cloughgrenan); 1628–1642	Succeeded by Edmund Butler
