= Sir Richard Butler, 5th Baronet =

Irish politician

The Right Honourable Sir Richard Butler Bt

Member of Parliament for County Carlow
- In office 1730–1761 Serving with Robert Burton
- Preceded by: Jeffrey Paul; Robert Burton
- Succeeded by: Benjamin Burton; Thomas Butler

Personal details
- Born: 1699
- Died: 25 November 1771 (aged 71–72)
- Spouse: Henrietta Percy (m. 1728)
- Relations: Sir Thomas Butler, 3rd Baronet (grandfather); Sir Pierce Butler, 4th Baronet (uncle); Edward Abney (grandfather)
- Children: 10, including Thomas, Pierce
- Parent(s): James Butler; Frances Abney Parker

Sir Richard Butler, 5th Baronet (1699 – 25 November 1771) was an Irish politician and baronet.

== Early life ==
He was the eldest son of James Butler and Frances (née Abney) Parker Butler. His mother was the widow of Sir John Parker, who lived at Fermoyle in County Longford.

His father was the second son of Sir Thomas Butler, 3rd Baronet and his mother was a daughter of Sir Edward Abney, MP for Leicester.

== Career ==
Butler represented County Carlow in the Irish House of Commons from 1730 to 1761.

In 1732, he succeeded his uncle Pierce as baronet.

== Personal life ==
In 1728, he married Henrietta Percy (1701–1794), daughter of Sir Henry Percy and Eliza (née Paul) Percy. Her grandfather was Sir Anthony Percy, Lord Mayor of London in 1699. Together, they had four sons and six daughters, including:

- Judith Butler (1730–1775), who married Thomas Tennant, Jr.
- Sir Thomas Butler, 6th Baronet (1735–1772), MP for County Carlow and Portarlington who married Dorothea Bayly, only daughter of Very Rev. Edward Bayly, Archdeacon of Dublin.
- Ann Eliza Butler (1736–1764), who married William Steuart, son of Col. Hon. John Steuart (nephew and heir of William Steuart), in c. 1752.
- James Butler (1736–1787), a captain in the 1st Regiment of Horse who died unmarried.
- Henrietta Butler (b. 1738), who married Nicholas Gordon.
- Jane Butler (1741–1802), who married Nicholas Trench, son of Richard Trench.
- Eleanor Butler (b. 1742), who married Edward Eustace, son of James Eustace, in 1765.
- Pierce Butler (1744–1822), a soldier, Founding Father, signatory of the U.S. Constitution, and South Carolina's inaugural Senator in the U.S. Senate.
- William Butler of Broomville (1747–1789), who married Henrietta Nixon, daughter of Abraham Nixon.

Sir Richard died on 25 November 1771 and was succeeded by his eldest son Thomas.

=== Descendants ===
His great-grandson, hereditary and absentee plantation owner Pierce Mease Butler, authorized The Great Slave Auction of 1859 to pay gambling debts.

Parliament of Ireland
Preceded by Jeffrey Paul; Robert Burton	Member of Parliament for County Carlow; 1730–1761; With: Robert Burton	Succeeded by Benjamin Burton; Thomas Butler
Baronetage of Ireland
Preceded by Pierce Butler	Baronet (of Cloughgrenan); 1732–1771	Succeeded by Thomas Butler
