= Sir Pierce Butler, 4th Baronet =

Irish politician & peer (1670–1732)

Sir Pierce Butler, 4th Baronet (1670 – 17 April 1732) was an Irish politician and baronet.

He was the eldest son of Sir Thomas Butler, 3rd Baronet and his wife Jane Boyle, daughter of the Right Reverend Richard Boyle, Bishop of Leighlin and Ferns. In 1691, Butler was educated at Trinity College Dublin and Lincoln's Inn. In 1704, he succeeded his father as baronet. Butler represented County Carlow in the Irish House of Commons from 1703 to 1715. In 1712, he was invested to the Privy Council of Ireland.

== Marriage ==
In December 1697, he married Anne Galliard, daughter of Joshua Galliard. Butler died without male issue and thus the baronetcy went to his nephew Richard.

== See also ==
- Butler dynasty

Parliament of Ireland
Preceded by Sir Thomas Butler, 3rd Bt; John Allen	Member of Parliament for County Carlow; 1703–1715; With: Sir Thomas Butler, 3rd Bt 1703–1704; Thomas Burdett 1704–1713; Jeffrey Paul 1713–1715	Succeeded by Francis Harrison; Thomas Burdett
Baronetage of Ireland
Preceded by Thomas Butler	Baronet (of Cloughgrenan); 1704–1732	Succeeded by Richard Butler
