= Battle of Affane =

1565 battle

- Part of the Private war between Fitzgeralds and Butlers
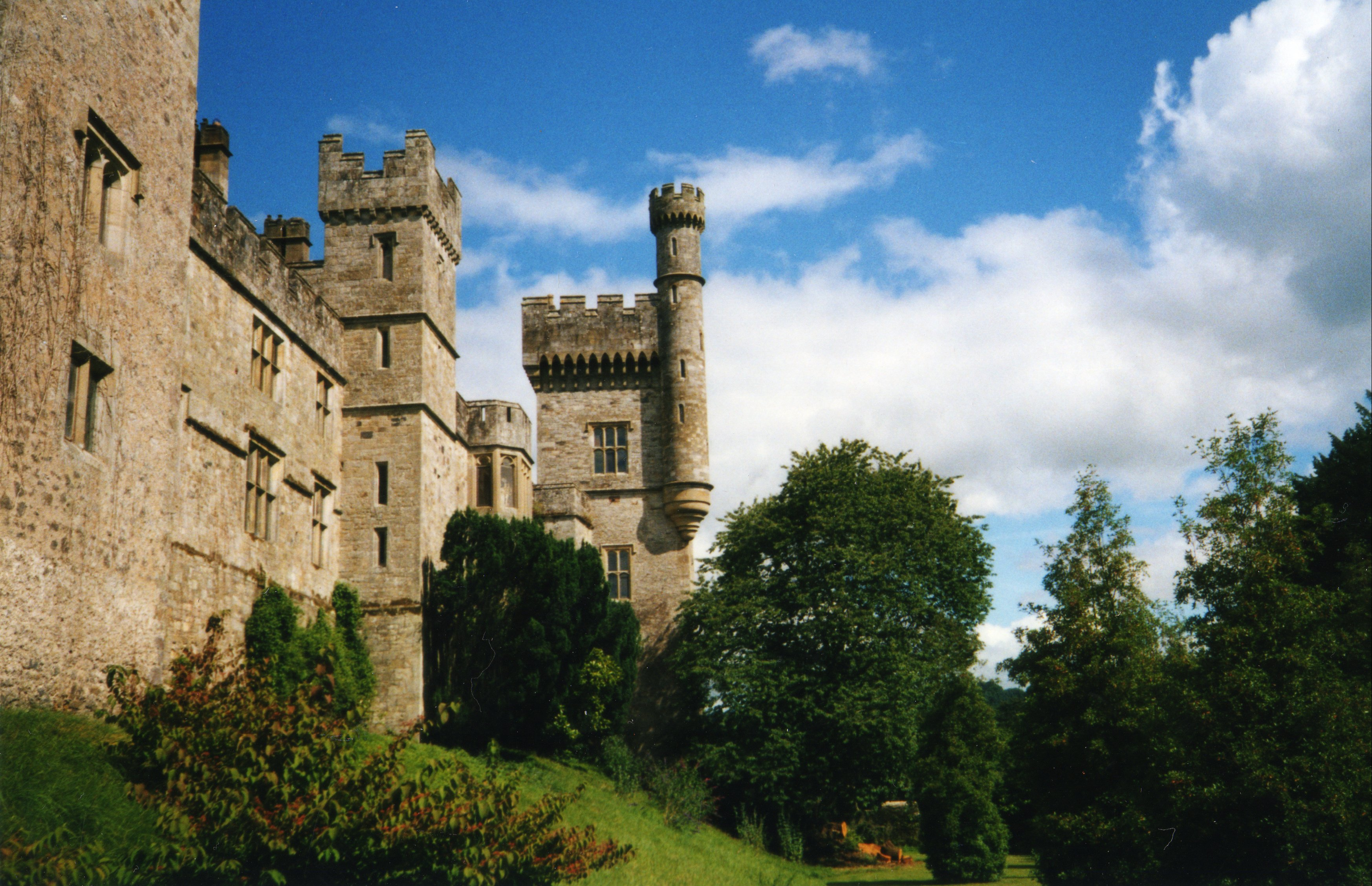
Date	8 February 1565
Location	Affane, County Waterford, Ireland 52°07′29″N 7°50′16″W
Result	Butler victory

Belligerents
FitzGerald of Desmond and allied clans	Butler of Ormond and allied clans

Commanders and leaders
Gerald FitzGerald	Thomas Butler

Strength
c. 180 horse, 3–400 heavy infantry, hundreds more Kern.	?

Casualties and losses
c. 300 killed	c. Low

The Battle of Affane (Irish: Cath Áth Mheáin) was fought in County Waterford, in south-eastern Ireland, in 1565, between the forces of the Fitzgerald Earl of Desmond and the Butler Earl of Ormond. The battle ended in the rout of the Desmond forces. It was one of the last private battles fought in Britain or Ireland.

== Causes – a private war ==
Munster and parts of south Leinster had been dominated by the Norman FitzGeralds of Desmond and the Butlers of Ormond since the 13th century. The vast Desmond lands spanned the northwest and east of Munster, across the modern counties of Kerry, Cork, County Limerick and Waterford from the tip of the Dingle peninsula to Lismore Castle and the mouth of the River Suir. Ormonde territory spanned eastern Munster and southwestern Leinster, across counties Tipperary and Kilkenny. The rival dynasties were locked in a cycle of raids as each side sought to consolidate and expand its territory at the expense of the other. In the 1560s, this exploded into war.

In the preceding years the widowed Countess of Ormonde, Joan FitzGerald, Countess of Ormond, mother of Sir Thomas Butler, 10th Earl of Ormonde, had married Gerald FitzGerald, 14th Earl of Desmond, with a view to reconcile the two houses. In 1560 her intervention secured a peaceful outcome to a stand-off at Bohermore (known as, the battle that never was). Her death in 1564 ended the truce, and raiding was resumed on both sides.

Gerald FitzJames FitzGerald, 14th Earl of Desmond, claimed jurisdiction over "The Déise" in County Waterford, and in January 1565, crossed the Blackwater with his army, to levy tribute in the old form of "coign and livery". Sir Maurice Fitzgerald, 1st Viscount Decies, chief of the district and a Desmond dependent, resident in the borderland between the territories, called on his first cousin, Thomas Butler, 10th Earl of Ormond for help. Ormonde mobilised his men to intercept the Geraldines at Affane, a ford over the Finisk, a tributary of the Blackwater River, in the foothills of the Knockmealdown Mountains near Lismore.

== Battle ==
Desmond's forces comprised his Fitzgerald kinsmen, allied Gaelic clans such as the O'Connors and O'Briens, and a disaffected dependent of Ormonde's, Sir Piers Butler of Cahir. Ormonde's troops were provided by the Butler lords with Gaelic and Old English levies.

Desmond left Lismore at first light with 80–100 horse, 300–400 foot, and hundreds of followers. In the company of the MacCarthys, O'Sullivans, MacSheehys, and O'Connors, he marched to Bewley at the tidal high point of the Finisk, where he demanded service of Maurice Fitzgerald in the formal way, according to the customary military exactions of coyne and livery. Fitzgerald offered to go to arbitration, but Desmond insisted on the sole decision of his brehon; they could not agree.

Desmond pitched camp, ordered the slaughter of 60 cattle, sent some horseboys out to fire a few houses and sent others to Dungarvan for wine. Three houses were set on fire, and Ormonde came down the mountain with the O'Kennedys, MacGillapatricks, and Burkes.

A local man advised Desmond to attack immediately, lying to him that Ormonde himself was absent. Lord Power, however, urged him to retreat to his house at Curraghmore and consider his position. Desmond's assessment was that the opposing forces were weak and could be taken with ease, and so he chose to attack. The Geraldines set off for Dromana in the parish of Affane, the chief seat of the Fitzgeralds of the Decies, taking up reinforcements at Lismore on the way.

At this point Ormonde had progressed to the ford of Affane, a short distance below Lismore Castle, where his forces, bearing a red flag, were passed by Desmond's foot soldiers at the crossroads. Desmond's men hoisted their banner, and matters came to a head. Desmond spotted Ormonde and spurred his horse onward, causing a desultory exchange of gunfire. Ormonde fell into defensive formation.

Ormonde's brother, Sir Edmund Butler of Cloughgrenan, hit Desmond in the right hip with a pistol-shot, cracking his thigh-bone and throwing him from his horse. With their leader fallen, the Geraldine troops were routed and the Butlers pursued them to the riverbank. About 300 Geraldines were killed, with many drowning as they were intercepted by armed boats in crossing the river.

As the badly wounded captive Desmond was being carried shoulder-high from the field, an Ormonde commander rode up and jubilantly inquired, "Where is now the great Lord Desmond?" Whereupon Desmond is said to have retorted, "Where but in his proper place, on the necks of the Butlers?"

Ormonde took the wounded Desmond in captivity to Clonmel and then to Waterford city, where Lord Deputy of Ireland Nicholas Arnold took custody of him after a legal wrangle with Ormonde. Sir Henry Sidney replaced Arnold, but his attention was initially occupied in dealing with the depredations of Shane O'Neill in Ulster. In 1567, Sidney headed south and attempted to broker peace between Desmond and Ormand. He brought Desmond a prisoner to Dublin, leaving Desmond's brother, John FitzJames FitzGerald, to govern Munster in the Earl's absence.

== Consequences ==
Elizabeth I of England was furious that two noble houses had fought a private battle, defying the authority she claimed over the Kingdom of Ireland. The fact that both sides had displayed their banners in the battle was a particular affront to her – it was a symbolic rejection of the monopoly of the crown on making war. (In the same year the Battle of Glentaisie was fought in Ulster, also a private battle.)

Both earls were summoned to London to explain their actions. However, the treatment of the dynasties was not even-handed: the Earl of Ormonde, a cousin of the Queen's and a court favourite, convinced Elizabeth that it was Desmond who was at fault. As a result, both Desmond (who had been brought before the privy council on a litter) and his brothers, Seán and James, were arrested and detained in the Tower of London; it was seven years before the earl returned to Munster with his wife, Eleanor. This action contributed significantly to unrest in the province of Munster and ultimately led to the first of the Desmond Rebellions in 1569.

== Sources ==
- Lennon, Colm. Sixteenth Century Ireland – The Incomplete Conquest. Gill & Macmillan, Dublin 1994. ISBN 0-71-713947-6
- Cyril Falls. Elizabeth's Irish Wars (1950; reprint London, 1996). ISBN 0-09-477220-7.

== Cultural references ==
- Dance composed to commemorate the battle.
