= County Carlow (Parliament of Ireland constituency) =

Pre-1801 Irish constituency

- Former county constituency for the Irish House of Commons
- County: County Carlow

–1801
- Seats: 2
- Replaced by: County Carlow (UKHC)

County Carlow was a county constituency representing County Carlow in the Irish House of Commons, the lower house in the Parliament of Ireland of the Kingdom of Ireland. The parliamentary boroughs of Carlow and Old Leighlin were separately represented.

Under the Acts of Union 1800, the county was represented from 1 January 1801 by the Westminster constituency of County Carlow with two MPs in the United Kingdom House of Commons. Old Leighlin lost its separate representation.

== Members of Parliament ==
- 1375: Godfrey de Valle and Philip de Valle
- 1420: Thomas Burton and Stephen Casse
- 1559: William FitzWilliam and Sir Edmund Butler
- 1585: Sir Henry Wallop and Geoffrey Fenton
- 1613–1615: Sir Morgan Cavanagh and George Bagenal of Dunleckny
- 1634–1635: Sir Thomas Butler, Bt and James Butler of Tinnehinch
- 1639–1649: Sir Thomas Butler, Bt (died 1642) and Oliver Eustace
- 1659: Sir Thomas Harman
- 1661–1666: Sir John Temple and Sir William Temple

=== 1689–1801 ===
Election	First MP	Second MP
1689	Dudley Bagenal	Henry Luttrell
1692	Sir Thomas Butler, 3rd Bt	John Tench
1695	Sir Thomas Butler, 3rd Bt	John Allen
1703	Sir Thomas Butler, 3rd Bt	Pierce Butler (Note: Succeeded as 4th Baronet in 1704.)
1704	Thomas Burdett	Pierce Butler
1713	Jeffrey Paul	Pierce Butler
1715	Francis Harrison	Thomas Burdett (Note: Created a baronet in 1723.)
1725	Jeffrey Paul	Thomas Burdett
1727	Jeffrey Paul	Robert Burton
1730	Richard Butler (Note: Succeeded as 5th baronet in 1732.)	Robert Burton
1761	Benjamin Burton	Thomas Butler
1767	John Hyde	Thomas Butler
1768	Beauchamp Bagenal	William Henry Burton
1776	William Bunbury	William Henry Burton
1778	Beauchamp Bagenal	William Henry Burton
1783	Sir Richard Butler, 7th Bt	William Henry Burton
1790	Henry Bruen	William Henry Burton
1796	Sir Richard Butler, 7th Bt	William Henry Burton
1801	Succeeded by the Westminster constituency County Carlow	

== Bibliography ==
- O'Hart, John (2007). The Irish and Anglo-Irish Landed Gentry: When Cromwell came to Ireland. Vol. II. Heritage Books. ISBN 978-0-7884-1927-0.
- Leigh Rayment's historical List of Members of the Irish House of Commons. Cites: Johnston-Liik, Edith Mary (2002). The History of the Irish Parliament 1692-1800 (6 volumes). Ulster Historical Foundation.
- Richardson, Henry Gerald; Sayles, George Osborne (1947). Parliaments And Councils Of Mediaeval Ireland (PDF). Vol. 1. Dublin: Stationery Office. p. xxx (38/308).
