= Elizabeth Preston, Countess of Desmond =

Irish countess (died 1628)

Elizabeth Preston
- Countess of Desmond
- Born: c. 1585
- Died: 10 October 1628; Wales
- Spouse: Richard Preston, 1st Earl of Desmond
- Issue Detail: Elizabeth Butler, Duchess of Ormond
- Father: Thomas Butler, 10th Earl of Ormond
- Mother: Elizabeth Sheffield

Elizabeth Preston, Countess of Desmond and 2nd Baroness Dingwall (née Butler; c. 1585 – 1628) was the only daughter of Thomas Butler, 10th Earl of Ormond, called Black Tom, a lone Protestant in his Catholic Old English family. Her marriage and inheritance were manipulated by James I to keep Black Tom's inheritance out of the hands of his Catholic successor, Walter of the Beads and bring them into the hands of his Scottish favourite Richard Preston, Lord Dingwall.

== Birth and origins ==
Family tree

Elizabeth Butler with her two husbands, her parents, and other selected relatives. (Note: This family tree is partly derived from the condensed Butler family tree pictured in Dunboyne. Also see the lists of siblings and children in the text.)

James; 9th Earl; 1496–1546	Joan; FitzGerald d. 1565
Thomas; 10th Earl c. 1531 – 1614; Black Tom	Elizabeth; Sheffield d. 1600	Edmund of Clough- grenan 1534–1602	John of Kilcash d. 1570
Theobald; Viscount; Tulleophelim d. 1613	Elizabeth; Butler c. 1585 – 1628	Richard; Preston; 1st Earl; Desmond d. 1628	Walter; 11th Earl; 1559 – 1633 'Beads'
Thomas; Viscount; Thurles d. 1619 d.v.p.*
Elizabeth; Preston; 1615–1684	James; 1st Duke; 1610–1688

Legend

XXX	Subject of the article	XXX	Earls & dukes of Ormond	XXX	Earls of Desmond

*d.v.p. = predeceased his father (decessit vita patris).

Elizabeth was born about 1585, probably at the Ormond Castle, Carrick-on-Suir, Ireland. She was the only surviving child of Thomas Butler, 10th Earl of Ormond, or Black Tom, and his second wife, Elizabeth Sheffield. Her father was the 10th Earl of Ormond and head of the Butler dynasty, an Old English family that descended from Theobald Walter, who had been appointed Chief Butler of Ireland by King Henry II in 1177. Her father had been married before to Elizabeth Berkeley but that marriage had stayed childless.

Elizabeth's mother was her father's second wife, who was English, a daughter of John Sheffield, 2nd Baron Sheffield and Douglas, daughter of William Howard, 1st Baron Howard of Effingham. Elizabeth's parents were both Protestant. They had married on 9 November 1582 in London.

Elizabeth was the only surviving of three siblings, who are listed in her father's article.

== Early life ==
Elizabeth Butler spent some of her most formative years in England, due to her father's influential role at the court of Elizabeth of England. It is believed that she lived with her mother in Canon Row, overlooking the river Thames, before returning to live in her father's ancestral lands in Ireland in February 1593.

Little is known of Butler's experience of returning to Ireland, or how she felt about leaving her father and the English court. However, it has been documented that she believed that one day she would return to England to be married to a prominent English lord. While we can only assume about why she came to believe this, it is likely that she expected to advance her family's already high position in politics as marriages during this period often served to form political alliances. Her fortune changed after 1596 when her Cloughgrenan cousins Piers and James rebelled against the crown.

Butler's mother died in 1600.

== First marriage ==
As Black Thomas, Lord Ormond, had no surviving male heir, his earldom was supposed to pass to his younger brother Sir Edmund Butler of Cloughgrenan, who was therefore his heir presumptive. This succession, however, was jeopardised by the Butler rebellion of 1569, fomented by Sir Edmund and his elder sons Piers and James. Edmund, Piers, and James were attainted in 1570. They were pardoned in 1573 but joined Tyrone's Rebellion. Thomas had Piers and James killed in 1596 during this rebellion.

Edmund's third and youngest son Theobald was too young to have been implicated in the rebellion. Black Tom now planned to have him as his heir. He asked the Queen to revert his attainder, which she did. To avoid splitting his inheritance between his heir and his daughter, Black Tom planned to marry his daughter to Theobald.

Elizabeth Butler was coached by her grandmother, Douglas Sheffield, on how to behave in the presence of the queen in order to prepare for an official court appearance. On Christmas in 1602, she made her court debut at Whitehall Palace serving as her own suitor to her marriage. Her appearance reportedly made a great impression upon the Queen.

As Theobald was his daughter's first cousin, Thomas needed to ask for a royal dispensation for a marriage between cousins, which he received from the dying Queen on 22 January 1603. Soon after his accession, the new king, James I, ennobled Theobald as Viscount of Tulleophelim. Elizabeth and Theobald married in 1603 and she became Viscountess Tulleophelim.

Despite his title, Lord Tulleophelim was neither wealthy nor influential and he expected his uncle and father-in-law, Black Tom, to support the newlyweds financially. Black Tom proved not generous and Tulleophelim blamed his wife for his lack of resources. Allegedly he also abused her. Their marriage remained childless.

In 1613 Lord Tulleophelim died unexpectedly in his forties. In the confident expectation that eventually he would inherit the vast Ormond estate, he had run up debts; the payment of these now passed to her, the dowager viscountess, but without the Ormond revenues. With Theobald's death no eligible descendants of Edmund remained and Walter, the eldest son of her father's next younger brother, John Butler of Kilcash, became heir presumptive.

== Second marriage and child ==
Now financially destitute, The dowager viscountess Tulleophelim had to find another husband. In the autumn of 1614 she married Sir Richard Preston, Lord Dingwall, a courtier from Scotland and ambassador to Venice, despite her father's disapproval. She therefore became Lady Dingwall as baroness.

Elizabeth and Richard had an only child:

- Elizabeth (1615–1684), who would marry James Butler, 1st Duke of Ormond

Lady Dingwall's father, Black Tom, the 10th Earl, died soon after their marriage on 22 November 1614 in Carrick-on-Suir. He was succeeded by his nephew Walter Butler, son of his brother John of Kilcash, as the 11th Earl of Ormond. Black Tom had also bequeathed almost all his possessions to his successor. Lord Dingwall challenged this inheritance in Elizabeth's name. Lord Dingwall was in good favour with King James leading to the overturning of the will through royal arbitration. On 3 October 1618 Elizabeth and her husband were awarded more than half of the Ormond estate, including Kilkenny Castle, although it was several years before they were able to take up residence there due to the obstructions of Walter's lawyers.

In July 1619 Lord Dingwall was created Baron Dunmore and 1st Earl of Desmond. In consequence she became Baroness Dunmore and Countess of Desmond. When the legal status of Kilkenny Castle was officially settled in 1623, Lady Dingwall returned to find the family home in a state of neglect and some of the furniture and family heirlooms missing.

That same year her husband supported the succession to the Ormond title in Walter's stead of a pretender calling himself Piers Butler and claiming to be a lawful son of Piers Butler, the eldest son of Sir Edmund Butler. This claim was contested by key members of the Butler family and the pretender was finally declared a fraud. Their support for this individual led to much controversy within the family and within their territories leading to Elizabeth, ultimately, leaving Ireland in August 1624 never to return.

== Death and timeline ==
Lady Dingwall died on 10 October 1628 in Wales and was eventually buried in Westminster Abbey. Her husband drowned at sea on the way to her funeral.

Their daughter, Elizabeth Preston, would later marry her cousin, James Butler, the future twelfth earl and first duke of Ormond.

Timeline
As her birth date is uncertain, so are all her ages.
Age	Date	Event
0	1585, about	Born.
14–15	1600, Nov	Her mother died.
17–18	1603, 24 Mar	Accession of King James I, succeeding Queen Elizabeth I
17–18	1603	Married Theobald Butler
27–28	1613, Jan	First husband died.
28–29	1614, autumn	Married Richard Preston, Lord Dingwall
28–29	1614, 22 Nov	Father, the 10th earl, died.
29–30	1615, 25 Jul	Birth of her daughter
39–40	1625, 27 Mar	Accession of King Charles I, succeeding King James I
42–43	1628, 10 Oct	Died in Wales

== See also ==
- History of Ireland (1536–1691)

== Notes and references ==
=== Sources ===
- Burke, Bernard; Burke, Ashworth Peter (1915). A Genealogical and Heraldic History of the Peerage and Baronetage, the Privy Council, Knightage and Companionage (77th ed.). London: Harrison. OCLC 1155471554.
- Butler, William F. T. (1929). "The Descendants of James, Ninth Earl of Ormond". The Journal of the Royal Society of Antiquaries of Ireland. 6th. 19 (1): 29–44. JSTOR 25513504.
- Cokayne, George Edward (1890). Complete Peerage of England, Scotland, Ireland, Great Britain and the United Kingdom, Extant, Extinct, or Dormant. Vol. III (1st ed.). London: George Bell and Sons. OCLC 1180838776. – D to F (for Desmond)
- Cokayne, George Edward (1895). Complete Peerage of England, Scotland, Ireland, Great Britain and the United Kingdom, Extant, Extinct, or Dormant. Vol. VI (1st ed.). London: George Bell and Sons. OCLC 1180818801. – N to R (for Ormond)
- Debrett, John (1828). Peerage of the United Kingdom of Great Britain and Ireland. Vol. II (17th ed.). London: F. C. and J. Rivington. OCLC 54499602. – Scotland and Ireland
- Dunboyne, Patrick Theobald Tower Butler, Baron (1968). Butler Family History (2nd ed.). Kilkenny: Rothe House.
- Edwards, David (1993). "The Butler Revolt of 1569". Irish Historical Studies. 28 (111): 228–255. doi:10.1017/S0021121400011032. JSTOR 30007491. S2CID 160535693.
- Edwards, David (October 2009). McGuire, James; Quinn, James (eds.). "Butler, Elizabeth". Dictionary of Irish Biography.
- Fryde, Edmund Boleslaw; Greenway, D. E.; Porter, S.; Roy, I., eds. (1986). Handbook of British Chronology. Royal Historical Society Guides and Handbooks, No. 2 (3rd ed.). London: Offices of the Royal Historical Society. ISBN 0-86193-106-8. – (for timeline)
- Paul, Sir James Balfour (1906). The Scots Peerage, Founded on Wood's Edition of Sir Robert Douglas's Peerage of Scotland. Vol. III. Edinburgh: David Douglas. OCLC 505064285. – Crawford to Falkland (for Dingwall)
