= Sir Thomas Burdett, 1st Baronet, of Dunmore =

Irish politician

Sir Thomas Burdett, 1st Baronet (14 September 1668 – 14 April 1727) was an Irish politician and baronet.

Born at Garrahill in County Carlow, he was the son of Thomas Burdett and his wife Catherine Kennedy, daughter of Sir Robert Kennedy, 1st Baronet. Burdett was educated at Kilkenny College and Trinity College Dublin and served as High Sheriff of Carlow in 1701.

Burdett entered the Irish House of Commons in 1704, sitting for County Carlow to 1713. Subsequently, he was Member of Parliament (MP) for the borough of Carlow until 1715 and then again for County Carlow until his death in 1727. On 11 July 1723, Burdett was created a baronet, of Dunmore, in the County of Carlow, with a special remainder to the heirs of his sister Anne, wife of Walter Weldon, who sat also in the Parliament of Ireland. In 1725, he was appointed Governor of County Carlow, a post he held for the next two years.

He married firstly the twice-widowed Honora Boyle, daughter of Michael Boyle, Lord Chancellor of Ireland and Archbishop of Armagh and his second wife Mary O'Brien, in 1700. She died ten years later and Burdett remarried Martha Vigors, daughter of Bartholomew Vigors, Bishop of Ferns and Leighlin and Martha Neale, in 1715. He died, aged 58 and was succeeded by his only son, William, by his second wife.

Parliament of Ireland
Preceded by Sir Thomas Butler, 3rd Bt; Pierce Butler	Member of Parliament for County Carlow; 1704–1713; With: Sir Pierce Butler, 4th Bt	Succeeded by Jeffrey Paul; Sir Pierce Butler, 4th Bt
Preceded by Richard Wolseley; Walter Weldon	Member of Parliament for Carlow; 1713–1715; With: Walter Weldon	Succeeded by Richard Wolseley; Walter Weldon
Preceded by Jeffrey Paul; Sir Pierce Butler, 4th Bt	Member of Parliament for County Carlow; 1715–1727; With: Francis Harrison 1715–1725; Jeffrey Paul 1725–1727	Succeeded by Jeffrey Paul; Robert Burton
Baronetage of Ireland
New creation	Baronet (of Dunmore); 1723–1727	Succeeded by William Vigors Burdett
