= Walter Butler, 11th Earl of Ormond =

Irish earl (1559–1633)

Walter Butler
- Earl of Ormond
- Tenure: 1614–1633
- Predecessor: Thomas, 10th Earl of Ormond
- Successor: James, 1st Duke of Ormond
- Born: 1559
- Died: 24 February 1633 (aged 73–74); Carrick-on-Suir
- Buried: St. Canice's Cathedral, Kilkenny
- Spouse: Helen Butler
- Issue Detail: Thomas & others
- Father: John Butler of Kilcash
- Mother: Katherine MacCarthy Reagh

Sir Walter Butler, 11th Earl of Ormond and 4th Earl of Ossory (1559–1633), succeeded his uncle Black Tom, the 10th earl, in 1614. He was called "Walter of the Beads" because he was a devout Catholic, whereas his uncle had been a Protestant. King James I intervened and awarded most of the inheritance to his uncle's Protestant daughter Elizabeth. Ormond contested the King's decision and was for that insolence detained in the Fleet Prison from 1619 until 1625 when he submitted to the King's ruling. He then found a means to reunite the Ormond estate, by marrying his grandson James, who had been raised a Protestant, to Elizabeth's only daughter.

== Birth and origins ==
Family tree

Walter Butler, 11th Earl, with wife, parents, and other selected relatives. (Note: This family tree is partly derived from the condensed Butler family tree pictured in Dunboyne. Also see the lists of his sons and daughters in the text.)

Piers; 8th Earl; Ormond; 1467–1539	Margaret; FitzGerald; 1473–1542
James; 9th Earl; 1496–1546	Joan; FitzGerald d. 1565	Richard; 1st Viscount; MountGarrett; 1500–1571
Thomas; 10th Earl c. 1531 – 1614	Elizabeth; Sheffield	John of Kilcash d. 1570	Katherine; MacCarthy; Reagh	Edmund; 2nd Viscount d. 1602
Theobald; Viscount; Tulleophelim d. 1613	Elizabeth; Butler c. 1585 – 1628	Richard; Preston; 1st Earl; Desmond d. 1628)	Walter; 11th Earl; 1559–1633 'Beads'	Helen; Butler d. 1631
Thomas; Viscount; Thurles d. 1619 d.v.p.*	Elizabeth; Pointz; 1587–1673
Elizabeth; Preston; 1615–1684	James; 1st Duke; 1610–1688	Richard of Kilcash; 1615–1701	Frances; Tuchet

Legend

XXX	Subject of the article	XXX	Earls & dukes of Ormond	XXX	Viscount; Mountgarret

*d.v.p. = predeceased his father (decessit vita patris)

Walter was born in 1559, (Note: Older literature give his year of birth as 1569.) the second son of John Butler of Kilcash and his wife Katherine MacCarthy. His father was a younger son of James Butler, 9th Earl of Ormond. His father's family, the Butler Dynasty, was Old English and descended from Theobald Walter, who had been appointed chief butler of Ireland by King Henry II in 1177.

Walter's mother was a daughter of Cormac na Haoine MacCarthy Reagh. Her father was the 13th prince of Carbery. Her family was Gaelic Irish. Walter's parents were both Catholic. Walter was one of four siblings, who are listed in his father's article.

== Early life ==
Butler was brought up as a devout Catholic and was known as "Walter of the Beads" (Irish: "Váitéar an Phaidrín").

His father, John of Kilcash, died on 10 May 1570 when Walter was about eleven. His brother James inherited but died unmarried sometime before September 1576 when Walter became the owner of the land around Kilcash Castle that had been his father's appanage.

Butler worked closely with his uncle, the Earl of Ormond. As a reward for his military service with the earl, he was knighted by Adam Loftus and Robert Gardiner in 1598.

== Marriage and children ==
About 1584 Butler married a second cousin, Helen Butler (also known as Ellen), eldest daughter of Edmund Butler, 2nd Viscount Mountgarret and his wife Grizel FitzPatrick. Their common great-grandfather was Piers Butler, 8th Earl of Ormond.

Walter and Helen had two sons:

1. Thomas Butler, Viscount Thurles (1594–1619), married Elizabeth, daughter of Sir John Pointz, and had issue, including James Butler, 1st Duke of Ormond
2. James, died young in France

—and nine daughters:

1. Margaret, married Barnaby Fitzpatrick, 5th Baron Upper Ossory
2. Catherine, married Piers Power of Monalargie, 2nd son of Richard Power, 2nd Baron Power of Curraghmore
3. Ellen (died 1663), married Pierce Butler, 1st Viscount Ikerrin
4. Helena, married James Butler of Grellagh, 5th son of James Butler, 2nd Baron Dunboyne
5. Joan, married 1st George Bagenal, 2ndly Theobald Purcell, and 3rdly Sir Thomas Esmond, 1st Baronet.
6. Mary, married George Hamilton of Greenlaw and Roscrea
7. Elizabeth, married 1st Sir Edmond Blanchville and 2ndly Richard Burke, 6th Earl of Clanricarde
8. Eleanor (died 1633), died unmarried
9. Ellis Butler (died 1625), who married Sir Terence O'Brien-Arragh, 1st Baronet of Arragh

== Member of parliament ==
In 1613 the only Irish parliament of the reign of James I was called. On 13 April 1613 Butler was returned as member of the Irish House of Commons for County Tipperary County. He was part of the resistance to government attempts to introduce anti-Catholic legislation.

== Earl of Ormond ==
His uncle, Black Tom, the 10th Earl died on 22 November 1614 leaving an only daughter, Elizabeth, who had married Richard Preston, 1st Earl of Desmond. Butler, his nephew, succeeded as the 11th Earl of Ormond and expected to also inherit the estates, but his claim to the family estates was challenged by Richard Preston, the husband of the 10th Earl's only child. The dispute was arbitrated by King James I, who awarded most of the estate, including Kilkenny Castle, to Preston. Ormond, as he now was, spent much time and money in litigation opposing the King's decision. His persistence resulted in him being committed to the Fleet prison in 1617. He remained incarcerated for eight years in great want with no rents reaching him from his estate. James meanwhile challenged his ownership of the county palatine of Tipperary with a writ of quo warranto (by what right?). This county had been vested in the head of the family for nearly four hundred years and could therefore under no circumstance have belonged to his cousin Elizabeth, the wife of Richard Preston. No answer was made to the writ, if indeed an opportunity was afforded for an answer, and James took the county palatine into his own hands.

Ormond was freed in 1625 and large parts of his estates were restored to him. For some while he lived in a house in Drury Lane, London, with his grandson James, afterwards Duke of Ormond. In 1629, on the projected marriage of his grandson with Elizabeth Preston, Preston's only child, Charles I of England granted her marriage and the wardship of her lands to him by letters patent dated 8 September. After the marriage Ormond was recognised, on 9 October 1630, heir to the lands of his uncle, Earl Thomas, as well as of Sir John Butler of Kilcash, his father.

Ormond also suffered problems within his own family. His son Thomas, styled viscount Thurles, married the daughter of Sir John Poyntz of Gloucestershire against his wish. In 1619 Thomas was accidentally drowned at The Skerries, Isle of Anglesey, at the beginning of Walter's long imprisonment in the Fleet Prison. Viscount Thurles had been a prominent Catholic and at the time of his death, was being sent to England on charges of having garrisoned Kilkenny.

== Death and timeline ==
Ormond died at Carrick-on-Suir on 24 February 1633 and was buried in St. Canice's Cathedral, Kilkenny, on 18 June 1633. His eldest son having predeceased him, he was succeeded by his grandson, James Butler, later the 1st Duke of Ormond.

Timeline
Italics for historical background.
Age	Date	Event
0	1559	Born
10–11	10 May 1570	Father died.
16–17	Before Sep 1576	Elder brother James died.
24–25	About 1584	Married Helen Butler.
41–42	23 Sep 1601	The Spanish landed at Kinsale
43–44	24 Mar 1603	Accession of King James I, succeeding Queen Elizabeth I
53–54	13 Apr 1613	Was returned as one of two MPs for Tipperary County.
54–55	22 Nov 1614	Uncle Thomas, the 10th earl, dies.
57–58	1617	Detained in Fleet Prison.
65–66	18 Mar 1625	Submitted to the King's decision.
65–66	27 Mar 1625	Accession of King Charles I, succeeding King James I
68–69	10 Oct 1628	Cousin Elizabeth Butler, Countess of Desmond died.
68–69	28 Oct 1628	Richard Preston, 1st Earl of Desmond drowned.
69–70	25 Dec 1629	Grandson James married Elizabeth Preston.
71–72	28 Jan 1631	Mother died.
73–74	24 Feb 1633	Died at Carrick-on-Suir.

== Notes and references ==
=== Sources ===
- Armstrong, Robert (October 2009). McGuire, James; Quinn, James (eds.). "Butler, Thomas". Dictionary of Irish Biography.
- Airy, Osmund (1886). "Butler, Walter, of Kilcash, eleventh Earl of Ormonde (1569–1633)". In Lee, Sidney (ed.). Dictionary of National Biography. Vol. VIII. New York: MacMillan and Co. p. 86. OCLC 8544105.
- Burke, Bernard (1866). A Genealogical History of the Dormant, Abeyant, Forfeited and Extinct Peerages of the British Empire (New ed.). London: Harrison. OCLC 11501348.
- Burke, Bernard; Burke, Ashworth Peter (1915). A Genealogical and Heraldic History of the Peerage and Baronetage, the Privy Council, Knightage and Companionage (77th ed.). London: Harrison. OCLC 1155471554.
- Cokayne, George Edward (1895). Complete Peerage of England, Scotland, Ireland, Great Britain and the United Kingdom, Extant, Extinct, or Dormant. Vol. VI (1st ed.). London: George Bell and Sons. OCLC 1180818801. – N to R (for Ormond)
- Debrett, John (1828). Peerage of the United Kingdom of Great Britain and Ireland. Vol. II (17th ed.). London: F. C. and J. Rivington. OCLC 54499602. – Scotland and Ireland
- Dunboyne, Patrick Theobald Tower Butler, Baron (1968). Butler Family History (2nd ed.). Kilkenny: Rothe House.
- Edwards, David (2004). "Butler, Walter, eleventh earl of Ormond and fourth Earl of Ossory (1559–1633)". In Matthew, Henry Colin Gray; Harrison, Brian (eds.). Oxford Dictionary of National Biography. Vol. 9. New York: Oxford University Press. pp. 230–231. ISBN 0-19-861359-8.
- Flood, John (2020). Kilcash and the Butlers of Ormond: Conflict and Kinship from the Middle Ages to the Great Famine. Dublin: Geography Publications. ISBN 978-0-906602-94-2. — Google Books no preview
- French, Rev. Nicholas (1846) [1st pub. 1676]. Bindon, Samuel Henry (ed.). The Historical Works of the Right Rev. Nicholas French. Vol. II. Dublin: James Duffy. OCLC 4187137. – Contains "The Unkinde Desertor of Loyall Men and True Frinds"
- Fryde, Edmund Boleslaw; Greenway, D. E.; Porter, S.; Roy, I., eds. (1986). Handbook of British Chronology. Royal Historical Society Guides and Handbooks, No. 2 (3rd ed.). London: Offices of the Royal Historical Society. ISBN 0-86193-106-8. – (for timeline)
- House of Commons (1878). Return. Members of Parliament – Part II. Parliaments of Great Britain, 1705–1796. Parliaments of the United Kingdom, 1801–1874. Parliaments and Conventions of the Estates of Scotland, 1357–1707. Parliaments of Ireland, 1599–1800. London: His/Her Majesty's Stationery Office. OCLC 13112546.
- Joyce, Patrick Weston (1903). A Concise History of Ireland from the Earliest Times to 1837 (12th ed.). Dublin: M. H. Gill & Son. OCLC 815623752.
- Lodge, John (1789a). Archdall, Mervyn (ed.). The Peerage of Ireland or, A Genealogical History of the Present Nobility of that Kingdom. Vol. IV. Dublin: James Moore. OCLC 264906028. – Viscounts (for Butler, Viscount Mountgarrett)
- Shaw, William A. (1906). The Knights of England. Vol. II. London: Sherratt & Hughes. – Knights bachelors & Index

Peerage of Ireland
Preceded by Thomas Butler	Earl of Ormonde; Earl of Ossory	Succeeded by James Butler
