= Sir Thomas Butler, 3rd Baronet =

Irish politician

Sir Thomas Butler, 3rd Baronet of Cloughgrenan (a townland near Carlow), (died c. February 1704) was an Irish baronet and politician.

He was the son of Sir Edmund Butler, 2nd Baronet and Juliana Hyde, daughter of Bernard Hyde. By 1650, he succeeded his father as baronet. In 1670 and again in 1691, Butler was High Sheriff of Carlow. From 1692 until his death, he sat for County Carlow in the Irish House of Commons.

== Marriage and issue ==
Butler married firstly Jane Boyle, daughter of the Right Reverend Richard Boyle, Bishop of Leighlin and Ferns, and secondly Jane Pottinger, daughter of Captain Edward Pottinger and widow of John Reynolds, in July 1700. By his first wife, he had two sons. Pierce, the oldest of them, was a Member of Parliament for the same constituency his father had represented and succeeded to the baronetcy.

== See also ==
- Butler dynasty

Parliament of Ireland
| Preceded by Dudley Bagenal; Henry Luttrell | Member of Parliament for County Carlow; 1692–1704; With: John Trench 1692–1695; John Allen 1695–1703; Pierce Butler 1703–1704 | Succeeded by Thomas Burdett; Sir Pierce Butler, 4th Bt |
Baronetage of Ireland
| Preceded by Edmund Butler | Baronet (of Cloughgrenan) c. 1650 – 1704 | Succeeded by Pierce Butler |
