= Ormonde Castle =

Castle in Carrick-on-Suir, Ireland

Ormond Castle
- Caisleán Urmhumhan (Irish)
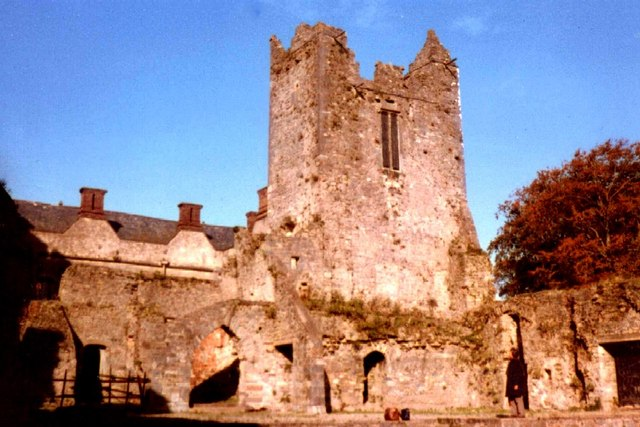
- Ormond Castle, with Tudor era manor house at rear.

- Location within Ireland
- 52°20′42″N 7°24′28″W
- Location: Carrick on Suir, County Tipperary, Ireland.

History
- Built: Mid 15th century

National monument of Ireland
- Official name: Carrick-on-Suir Castle
- Reference no.: 447

Ormond Castle (Irish: Caisleán Urmhumhan) is a castle on the River Suir on the east side of Carrick-on-Suir, County Tipperary, Ireland. The oldest part of the existing castle is a mid-15th century walled bawn, cornered on the northeast and northwest by towers.

== History of Ormonde Castle ==
Built before 1315, the original castle was acquired that year by the Butler Family after it was taken from the Wall Family. James Butler would eventually be granted the title 1st Earl of Ormond.

== The manor house ==
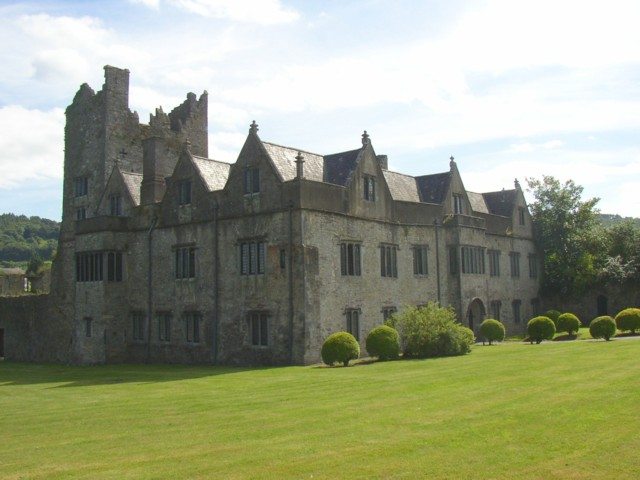
Ormonde Castle

Sometime after 1565, Thomas Butler, 10th Earl of Ormonde, spent many years at the court of his cousin through Anne Boleyn, Queen Elizabeth I. He carried from England a regard for Elizabethan-style architecture and added a Tudor manor house to the property, the first of its kind in Ireland.

The manor house is also important to the Elizabethan-era martyrology of the strictly illegal and underground Catholic Church in Ireland. While staying in Ormonde Castle as a guest of Thomas Butler, 10th Earl of Ormond, Archbishop Dermot O'Hurley, who would become one of the most celebrated of the 24 formally recognized Irish Catholic Martyrs, was met there by his former host, Baron Slane, in September 1583. The Baron explained the imminent danger to both himself and his family, and in return, the Archbishop voluntarily agreed to travel with him and surrender at Dublin Castle.

Meanwhile, despite his own militant Protestantism, the Earl of Ormonde was greatly offended and distressed at the trickery used in the arrest of a guest in his house. Afterward, he did everything he could in vain to rescue Archbishop O'Hurley from the executioners.

In the 17th century, the house was a favourite residence for James Butler, the 'Great Duke of Ormonde', but the Butlers abandoned the home after James' death in 1688. The home remained a possession of the Butler family until the mid-20th century. In 1947, the house was given over to Irish State agencies who restored the historic structures.

The mullioned windows on both floors enhance the manor house to the front and the oriel windows of the porch in the centre of the facade. The gallery on the first floor features two carved stone chimney piece, a ceiling, and frieze of Elizabethan plaster-work.

The U-shape of the manor house surrounds a small courtyard that abuts the north of the castle's bawn. The manor has two floors and a gabled attic.

The most notable restoration achievement was the long gallery on the first floor of the facade, where the ceiling had largely collapsed. Once hung with tapestries, this room has a magnificent limestone fireplace bearing the date 1565 and has stucco representations of Queen Elizabeth flanked by Equity and Justice. It is said that she had promised her cousin that she would one day visit.

== Namesake in the United States ==
- Ormond Plantation House in St. Charles Parish, Louisiana — named Ormond by Colonel Richard Butler, the owner from 1805 to 1819
