= Richard Preston, Earl of Desmond =

Royal favourite (died 1628)

Richard Preston
- Earl of Desmond
- Tenure: 1619–1628
- Died: 28 October 1628
- Spouse: Elizabeth Butler
- Issue Detail: Elizabeth
- Father: Richard Preston of Whitehill

Richard Preston, Earl of Desmond (died 1628) was a favourite of King James VI and I of Scotland and England. In 1609 the king made him Lord Dingwall. In 1614, he married Elizabeth Butler, the only child of Black Tom, the 10th Earl of Ormond, and in 1619 he was created Earl of Desmond.

== Background and early life ==
Richard was the third son of Richard Preston of Whitehill in Midlothian, near Edinburgh. His family was gentry of the Edinburgh area and owned Craigmillar Castle in the late 16th and early 17th century. He was known as Richard Preston of Haltree.

== Royal favourite ==
Richard Preston joined James VI in his marriage trip to Norway and Denmark in 1589. He is recorded a page at the court from 1591. King James had a series of personal relationships with male courtiers, called his favourites, suspected to have been the king's homosexual partners. Esmé Stewart, whom he made Earl and Duke of Lennox, seems to have been the first. After the Raid of Ruthven in 1582, the King was forced to exile Lord Lennox to France.

Richard Preston gained the king's special favour in the 1580s or 1590s after Lennox's departure. He taught military skills to Prince Henry. When King James acceded to the English throne in 1603, Preston accompanied him to England and was knighted at the King's coronation in London on 25 July 1603 in the old elaborate ceremony that included the bathing of the new knight. He then was made a groom of the privy chamber. In 1607, Preston was appointed constable of Dingwall Castle in Scotland. He bought the barony of Dingwall and on 8 June 1609 the King created him Lord Dingwall. In London the King met in 1608 Robert Carr who became his favourite and seems to have supplanted Lord Dingwall, as he was now, in that role.

== Masques and tournament pageants ==
On 6 January 1607, Preston was a performer as a Knight of Apollo in Lord Hay's Masque at Whitehall Palace, part of the celebrations at the wedding of Sir James Hay and Honora Denny. The nine knights were released from enchanted trees by the goddess of night.

In 1609, Preston attended the Accession day tournament, and presented a pageant of an artificial elephant, designed by Inigo Jones, which made its way slowly around the tiltyard. When Prince Henry was made Prince of Wales, a Scottish lord, either Preston or Lord Hay, presented a pageant on 6 June 1610, where "verie costlie apparelled" courtiers arrived in an artificial cloud. The cloud showered the spectators with water.

A tournament of tilting was held on New Year's Day 1614, to celebrate the wedding of Robert Carr and Frances Howard. The bride's team wore "murrey" and white and the groom's team were in green and yellow. Preston rode in murrey in the team of Ludovic Stewart, 2nd Duke of Lennox (the son of Esmé Stewart), with the professionals Sigismund Zinzan and Henry Zinzan.

== Military plans ==
In February 1612, at the request of a Danish ambassador Jonas Charisius, there were plans to raise an army under Robert Bertie, 12th Baron Willoughby and Sir Edward Cecil to fight against Sweden in the Kalmar War. Preston would command a regiment of Scottish troops and Irish troops would be led by the Earl of Clanrickard. It was said that the ambassador's cause was advocated by Anne of Denmark and, as the conditions offered were poor, he would have to press men and mariners. Willoughby sold land to raise funds. Willoughby's force went to Denmark but arrived after a truce was arranged by James Spens and Robert Anstruther.

== Marriage and child ==
In 1614, King James arranged for Lord Dingwall to marry an heiress, Lady Elizabeth Butler, only daughter of the Thomas Butler and widow of Theobald Butler, 1st Viscount Butler of Tulleophelim,

The King imposed this marriage on Elizabeth's father. The Earl of Ormond did not want the royal favourite for a son-in-law but could not oppose the King's will. Black Tom died soon after the marriage on 22 November 1614.

Richard and Elizabeth had an only child:

- Elizabeth (1615–1684), married James Butler and became Duchess of Ormond.

== Later life and death ==
On 19 July 1619 Lord Dingwall was created Earl of Desmond. The Earldom of Desmond had originally been held by the Hiberno-Norman FitzGerald dynasty who were stripped of the title after the failure of the Second Desmond Rebellion against Queen Elizabeth I of England. After Richard Preston's death, the title again became extinct but, under the terms of letter patent issued by James I in 1622, it was immediately re-created for George Feilding (son of the Earl of Denbigh) who was intended to marry Preston's daughter.

Alfred Webb tells us of this creation of the earldom of Desmond that:

Thomas Butler, 10th Earl of Ormond, in right of his mother, Joan FitzGerald, daughter of the 11th Earl of Desmond, claimed the Earldom after the death and attainder of all the heirs male. When his daughter was married to James I.'s Scotch favourite, Sir Richard Preston, the title was conferred on him. When the only child of the latter, a daughter, was about to be married to the son of the Earl of Denbigh, the title was passed to the intended bridegroom. The marriage never took place; yet the title was retained [by] the Earls of Denbigh.

On 26 May 1623, King James I made the young James Butler, the future Duke of Ormond, a ward of Lord Desmond, and placed James at Lambeth, London, under the care of George Abbot, archbishop of Canterbury to be brought up as a Protestant.

His wife, Elizabeth Butler died on 10 October 1628 in Wales. On 28 October 1628 Lord Desmond was drowned on a passage between Dublin and Holyhead.

Timeline
As his birth date is uncertain, so are all his ages.
| Age | Date | Event |
| 0 | 1580, estimate | Born, near Edinburgh |
| 10–11 | 1591 | Page at the court in Edinburgh. |
| 22–23 | 1603, 24 Mar | Accession of King James I, succeeding Queen Elizabeth I |
| 26–27 | 1607 | Made constable of Dingwall Castle. |
| 28–29 | 1609, 8 Jun | Became Lord Dingwall. |
| 33–34 | 1614 | Married Elizabeth Butler. |
| 33–34 | 1614, 22 Nov | Father-in-law, Thomas Butler, 10th Earl of Ormond, died at Carrick. |
| 34–35 | 1615, 25 Jul | Daughter born. |
| 38–39 | 1619, 16 Jul | Became Earl of Desmond |
| 44–45 | 1625, 27 Mar | Accession of King Charles I, succeeding King James I |
| 47–48 | 1628, 10 Oct | Wife died in Wales. |
| 47–48 | 1628, 28 Oct | Drowned on a passage between Dublin and Holyhead |

Family tree

Richard Preston with wife, parents, and other selected relatives.

James; 10th Earl d. 1529
James; 9th Earl; 1496–1546 | Joan; FitzGerald d. 1565
Thomas; 10th Earl c. 1531 – 1614; Black Tom | Elizabeth; Sheffield | John of Kilcash d. 1570 | Katherine; MacCarthy
Theobald; Viscount; Tulleophelim d. 1613 | Elizabeth; Butler c. 1585 – 1628 | Richard; Preston; Earl; Desmond d. 1628 | Walter; 11th Earl; 1559 – 1633 'Beads' | Helen; Butler d. 1631
Thomas; Viscount; Thurles d. 1619 d.v.p.* | Elizabeth; Pointz; 1587–1673
Elizabeth; Preston; 1615–1684 | James; 1st Duke; 1610–1688 | Richard of Kilcash; 1615–1701
Thomas; 6th Earl; Ossory; 1633–1680 d.v.p.* | Emilia von Nassau; 1635–1688 | Richard; 1st Earl; Arran; 1639–1684 | Elizabeth; Countess of Chesterfield; 1640–1665 | Walter of Garryricken d. 1700

Legend

| XXX | Richard; Preston | XXX | Earls & dukes of Ormond | XXX | Earls of Desmond |

*d.v.p. = predeceased his father (decessit vita patris).
