= Coign and livery =

Military exactions in Gaelic Ireland

Coign and livery or coyne and livery (Irish: coinmheadh is buannacht) in Gaelic Ireland was the free entertainment which a chief exacted from his subjects for his servants and followers. Originally in Brehon law it took the form of a feast held when the chief passed through a subject's lands. By the late medieval period it was often an oppressive charge to billet and supply the chief's professional soldiers (kern and gallowglasses), enforced by those same soldiers. It was the most important of the exactions which lesser chiefs resented of their superiors. The surrender and regrant and composition imposed by the English during the Tudor conquest of Ireland sought to abolish Gaelic customs of chiefship and replace all exactions with a single rent charged on land holdings. This was accordingly supported by the lesser chiefs, but opposed by the over chiefs such as Gerald FitzGerald, 11th Earl of Kildare.

== See also ==
- Purveyance, English equivalent
- Quartering Acts, requiring American colonies to billet British soldiers; one of the grievances that led to the American Revolution
