= Richard Boyle (bishop of Ferns and Leighlin) =

Irish Anglican bishop

Richard Boyle D.D. was an Anglican bishop in the early seventeenth century.

He was appointed Dean of Limerick in 1661, and Treasurer in 1663. In 1666 he was appointed Bishop of Ferns and Leighlin.

He died in 1682 and is buried at St Laserian's Cathedral, Old Leighlin.

Church of Ireland titles
Preceded by Robert Naylor	Dean of Limerick; 1661–1666	Succeeded by John Smith
Preceded by Robert Price	Bishop of Ferns and Leighlin; 1666–1682	Succeeded by Narcissus Marsh
