= Thomas Butler, 10th Earl of Ormond =

Protestant Irish lord (died 1614)

Thomas Butler
- Earl of Ormond
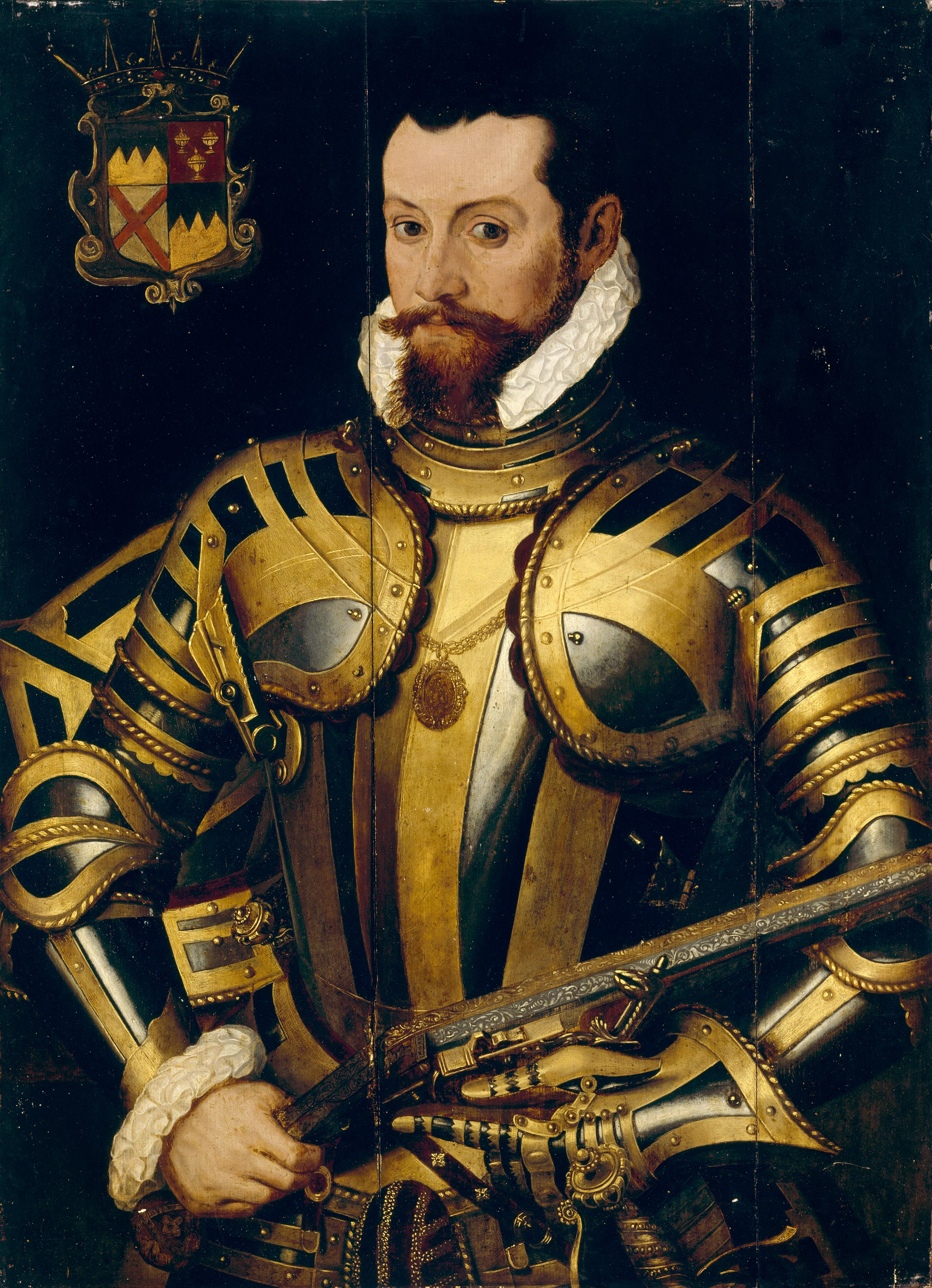
- Detail of the portrait shown below
- Tenure: 1546–1614
- Predecessor: James, 9th Earl of Ormond
- Successor: Walter, 11th Earl of Ormond
- Born: February 1531
- Died: 22 November 1614 (aged 83); Carrick-on-Suir, Ireland
- Spouses: 1. Elizabeth Berkeley; 2. Elizabeth Sheffield; 3. Helena Barry
- Issue Detail: Elizabeth, only surviving child
- Father: James Butler
- Mother: Joan Fitzgerald

Thomas Butler, 10th Earl of Ormond and 3rd Earl of Ossory KG PC (Ire) (Irish: Tomás Dubh de Buitléir, Iarla Urmhamhan; c. 1531 – 1614), was an influential courtier in London at the court of Elizabeth I. He was Lord Treasurer of Ireland from 1559 to his death. He fought for the crown in the Rough Wooing, the Desmond Rebellions, and Tyrone's Rebellion. He fought his rival, Gerald FitzGerald, 14th Earl of Desmond in the Battle of Affane in 1565.

== Birth and origins ==
Family tree

Thomas Butler with wife, parents, and other selected relatives. (Note: This family tree is derived the one in Cokayne and from the condensed Butler family tree pictured in Dunboyne. Also see the list of children in the text.)

Piers; 8th Earl; 1467–1539	Margaret; FitzGerald c. 1473 – 1542	James; 10th Earl d. 1529	Amy; O'Brien
James; 9th Earl; 1496–1546	Joan; FitzGerald d. 1565	Gerald; 14th Earl c. 1533 – 1583; Rebel Earl
Elizabeth; Berkeley d. 1582	Thomas; 10th Earl c. 1531 – 1614; Black Tom	Elizabeth; Sheffield d. 1600	Edmund of Cloughgrenan; 1534–1602	John of Kilcash d. 1570
Theobald; Viscount; Tulleophelim d. 1613	Elizabeth; Butler c. 1585 – 1628	Richard; Preston; 1st Earl; Desmond d. 1628	Walter; 11th Earl; 1559–1633 'Beads'
Thomas; Viscount; Thurles d. 1619 d.v.p.*	Elizabeth; Pointz; 1587–1673
Elizabeth; Preston; 1615–1684	James; 1st Duke; 1610–1688	Richard of Kilcash; 1615–1701

Legend

XXX	Thomas; Butler	XXX	Earls & dukes of Ormond	XXX	Earls of Desmond

*d.v.p. = predeceased his father (decessit vita patris)

Thomas was born about February 1531 (Note: Authors seem to agree that he was born either in 1531 or in 1532. Edwards (2004) says "about February 1531"; Edwards (2009) says "1531–1614"; Cokayne (1895) and Lee (1886) say 1532.) in southern Ireland. He was the eldest son of James Butler and his wife Joan FitzGerald. At the time of his birth, his father was still heir apparent but would succeed as 9th Earl of Ormond in 1539. His father's family was the Butler dynasty, who were of Anglo-Norman origin. The family descended from Theobald Walter, who had been appointed Chief Butler of Ireland by King Henry II in 1177.

Thomas's mother was a daughter of James FitzGerald, 10th Earl of Desmond. Her family, the Geraldines, were of Cambro-Norman and Anglo-Norman origin. It was once believed that his parents had married about 1520, but this is now known to be impossible as, in 1521–2, his father was briefly betrothed to his English cousin Anne Boleyn. James and Joan did not marry until about 1528, with Thomas as their first child being born three, rather than eleven, years later.

He was one of seven brothers, which are listed in his father's article. No sisters are known and he probably had none, since the siblings were born about two years apart.

== Early life ==
In 1539 his grandfather died and his father succeeded as the 9th earl of Ormond. Born in Ireland, Butler was sent to London in May 1544 aged about 13, to be brought up at the English court where he adopted English speech, dress, and manners, as well as the Protestant religion.

=== Elizabeth I ===
The future Lord Ormond and the future Queen Elizabeth met in London as children. Thomas, the "son of an Irish Earl", and Elizabeth, the "illegitimate daughter of Henry VIII", shared a common experience: neither was well-treated by the other young nobles at court. They were distant (4th) cousins through her mother, Anne Boleyn, whose paternal grandmother, Lady Margaret Butler, was a daughter of the 7th Earl (open the collapsed family tree below).

Family tree: Thomas & Elizabeth

Lord Ormond and Queen Elizabeth were 4th cousins. The 3rd Earl of Ormond and his wife were the nearest common ancestors.

James; 3rd Earl c. 1359 – 1405	Anne; Welles; 1360–1397
James; 4th Earl; 1392–1452	Joan de Beauchamp; 1396–1430	Richard; Butler; 1395–1443 of Polestown	Catherine; O'Reilly; 1395–1420
Thomas; 7th Earl; 1426–1515	Anne; Hankford; 1431–1485	Edmund; MacRichard; Butler; 1420–1464	Catherine; O'Carroll d. 1506
William; Boleyn; 1451–1505	Margaret; Butler c. 1454 – 1539	James; Butler d. 1487 of Polestown	Sabh; Kavanagh
Thomas; Boleyn c. 1477 – 1539	Elizabeth; Howard c. 1480 – 1538	Piers; 8th Earl; 1467–1539	Margaret; FitzGerald c. 1473 – 1542
Henri VIII; 1491–1547	Anne; Boleyn c. 1501 – 1536	James; 9th Earl; 1496–1546	Joan; FitzGerald d. 1565
Elizabeth; 1533–1603	Thomas; 10th Earl c. 1531 – 1614

Legend

XXX	Thomas; Butler	XXX	Earls of Ormond	XXX	Kings and Queens of England

This family tree is derived from the one in Cokayne and from the condensed Butler family tree pictured in Dunboyne.

Elizabeth called him her "black husband."

=== Earl of Ormond ===
On 28 October 1546, when Butler was 15, his father, the 9th Earl of Ormond died in London after having been poisoned during a banquet at Ely House, probably at the instigation of Anthony St Leger, who was Lord Deputy of Ireland and a political opponent. Thomas Butler succeeded as the 10th Earl of Ormond and the 3rd Earl of Ossory. He became a ward of the King.

Ormond, as he now was, was knighted on 20 February 1547, at the coronation of Edward VI. On 10 September 1547 during the Rough Wooing he served at the Battle of Pinkie under Edward Seymour, 1st Duke of Somerset against the Scots. In 1554, during the reign of Queen Mary, Ormond helped to put down Wyatt's rebellion.

His mother remarried to Francis Bryan in 1548, and then to Gerald FitzGerald, 14th Earl of Desmond in 1551.

In 1554 his illegitimate son, Piers FitzThomas Butler of Duisk, was born. There were unfounded rumours that Elizabeth was the mother, something which was particularly impossible at the time of Piers's birth when the Princess was away from court, imprisoned, then under house arrest, and frequent public questioning for her alleged complicity in the Wyatt Rebellion. Piers's son, Edward would become the 1st Viscount Galmoye.

On 17 November 1558 Elizabeth succeeded Mary as Queen of England. On 26 August 1559 Ormond was appointed Lord Treasurer of Ireland by the Queen, which automatically made him a privy councillor of Ireland.

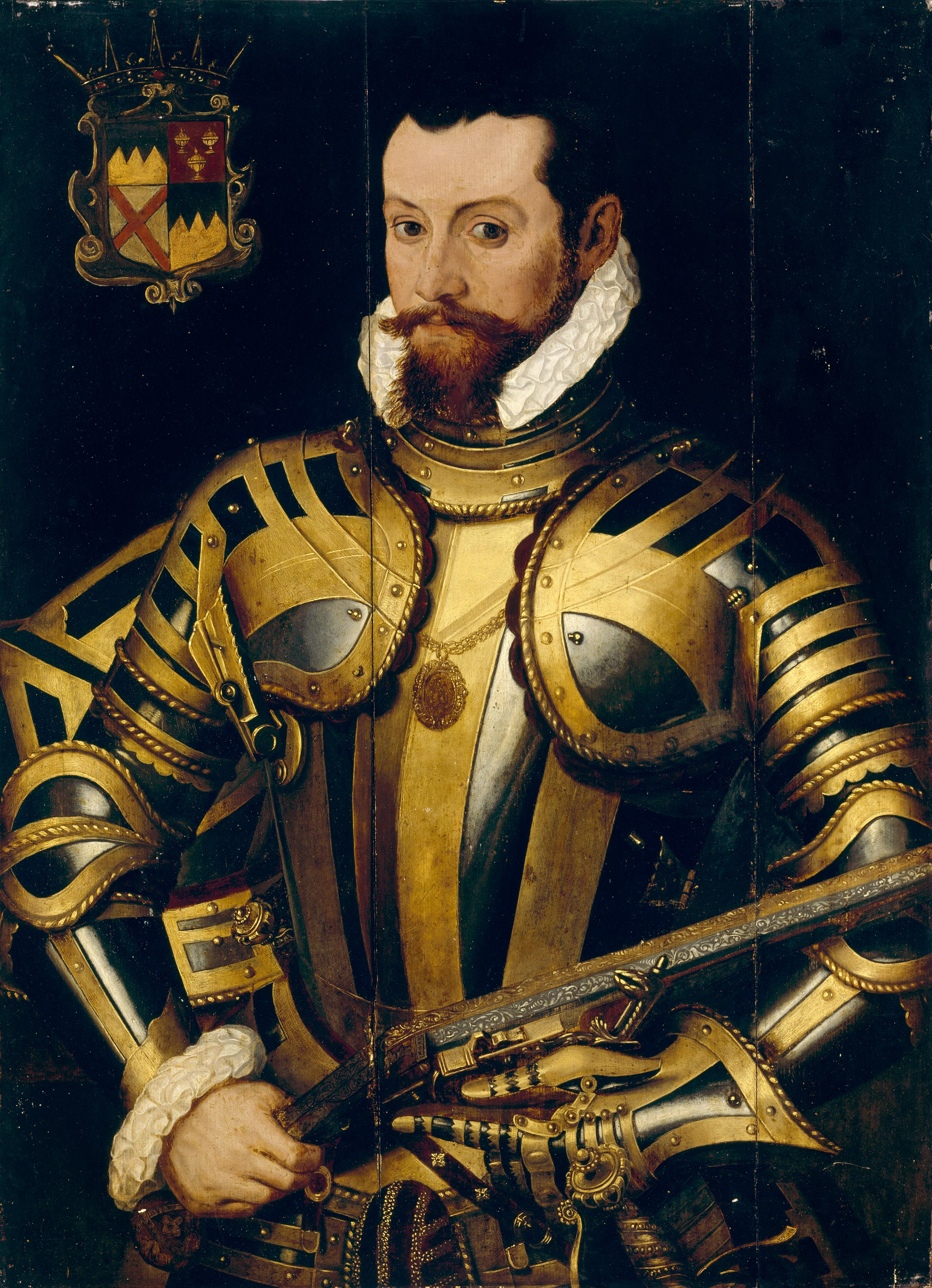
Thomas Butler, Earl of Ormond, by Steven van der Meulen

== First marriage ==
About 1559 Ormond married his first wife, Elizabeth Berkeley, daughter of Thomas Berkeley, 6th Baron Berkeley and Anne Savage. His bride was considered a beauty at the court. However, the marriage was not happy and she had lovers. They separated in 1564 without having had children, but she refused a divorce. She would finally die on 1 September 1582 in Bristol. That meant that Ormond did not have an heir and that according to the normal rule of succession, his younger brother Edmund was his heir presumptive.

In the 1560s Ormond built the Tudor manor-house extension to Ormonde Castle on the banks of the River Suir in Carrick-on-Suir, County Tipperary. All of this was done to provide Elizabeth with a suitable palace at which to stay when she travelled to Ireland. Elizabeth planned twice to visit him there: once in 1602 (which visit was cancelled by her illness); and again in 1603. She died, however, before the planned visit could take place. It is known that Elizabeth appreciated Thomas's effort, and was—as she was with all of her maternal cousins—very fond of him. Thomas survived Elizabeth by 11 years.

== Irish wars ==
=== Affane ===
Much of Ormond's life was taken up with a fierce feud with his hereditary foes, the Earls of Desmond. The Desmonds were the Ormonds' neighbours on the western and southern sides. Despite their enmity, these two families were both more or less Gaelicized Old English and had intermarried many times; the last such marriage having been that of Ormond's parents. The Desmond rebellions should also be seen in the wider picture of the Tudor conquest of Ireland.

In 1560 his mother's intervention secured a peaceful outcome to a stand-off at Bohermore (known as "the battle that never was"). However, only a bit more than a month after her death on 2 January 1565, on 8 February 1565, the two sides fought the private Battle of Affane, in which her husband Gerald FitzGerald, 14th Earl of Desmond was taken prisoner by the Ormond faction after her son Edmund had shot him into the hip with his pistol. Lords Ormond and Desmond were called to London and promised to keep the peace.

Ormond was that summer high in favour with the Queen.

=== First Desmond rebellion ===
The first Desmond Rebellion (1569–1573) was started by James fitz Maurice FitzGerald, captain of the Desmond forces in the earl's absence. He was supported by many Irish in southern Ireland but also by some of Ormond's six brothers, notably Edmund. The rebellion was directed against Henry Sidney the Lord Deputy of Ireland. Ormond returned to Ireland landing at Waterford in July 1569. His brothers submitted quickly.

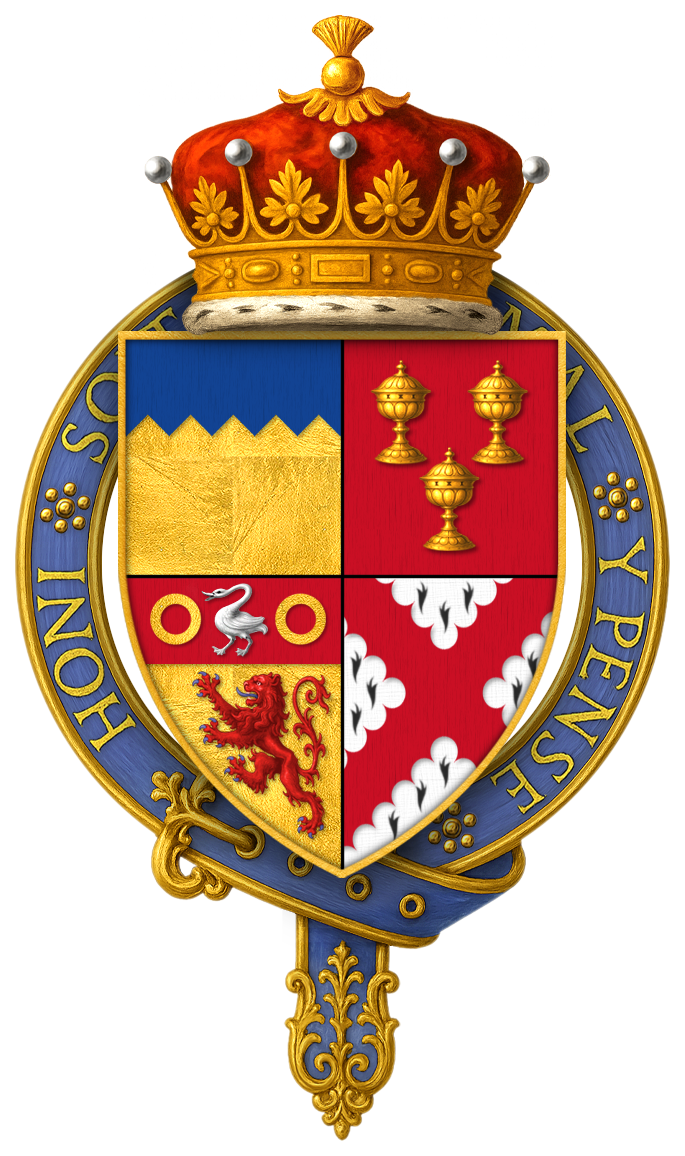
Quartered arms of Sir Thomas Butler, 10th Earl of Ormond, KG

However, Edmund, Edward and Piers were attainted in April 1570 by an act of the Irish Parliament. That meant that Edmund ceased to be Ormond's heir presumptive and the next brother, John Butler of Kilcash, took his place. However, not for long as John died on 10 May 1570. John's eldest son, Walter, therefore became heir presumptive. James fitz Maurice FitzGerald surrendered on 23 February 1573 and Gerald followed in September ending the first Desmond rebellion.

Lord Desmond was released about 1573 and allowed to return from England to Ireland. James FitzMaurice FitzGerald left for the continent.

=== Second Desmond rebellion ===
The second Desmond Rebellion (1579–1583) was triggered by the landing of James fitz Maurice FitzGerald at Dingle On 17 June 1579. Lord Desmond rose in rebellion. Ormond was appointed governor of Munster and sent to Ireland.

Both rebellions desolated Munster for many years. Ormond was a Protestant belonging to the Church of Ireland and threw his great influence on the side of Queen Elizabeth I and her ministers in their efforts to crush the rebels, although he was motivated as much by factional rivalry with the Desmond dynasty as by religion. He had command of the Royal Irish Army tasked with the suppression of the rebellions, which he eventually accomplished.

== Second marriage and children ==
At the age of 51, having been freed by the death of his estranged first wife on 1 September 1582, Ormond remarried Elizabeth Sheffield on 9 November in London. She was the daughter of John Sheffield, 2nd Baron Sheffield and Douglas, daughter of William Howard, 1st Baron Howard of Effingham.

Thomas and Elizabeth had three children:

1. John (1584–1589), died young;
2. Elizabeth (before 1593 – 1628), married 1st her first cousin Theobald, son of Thomas's brother Edmund, but Theobald died childless in 1613; she married 2ndly Richard Preston, 1st Earl of Desmond, and had one daughter, Elizabeth Preston;
3. Thomas (before 1601 – 1606), died young on 17 January 1606 and is buried in Carrick-on-Suir.

== Later life and third marriage ==
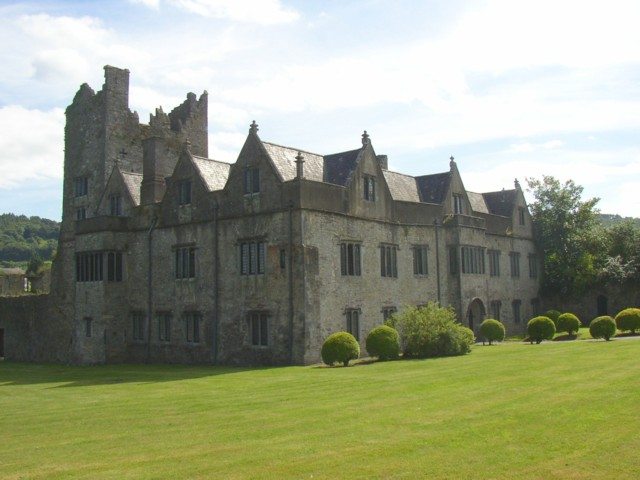
Ormonde Castle at Carrick on Suir

In 1580 Ormond improved Kilkenny Castle by building the great gallery.

In spring 1588, the Queen made Ormond a Knight of the Garter. When in the summer of that year the Spanish Armada menaced England, he was with her at the review of the troops at Tilbury where she gave the patriotic speech to the troop at Tilbury. He had at that occasion the honour to carry the sword of state before her.

In 1600 he helped to suppress Tyrone's Rebellion. Between April 1600 and June 1600 he was held captive by Owny MacRory O'More who had invaded Munster with Irish forces from Leinster.

Ormond's second wife died in November 1600. In June 1601 Ormond, aged 70, married his third wife, Helena Barry, daughter of David de Barry, 5th Viscount Buttevant. It was her second marriage, her first husband having been John Power. The marriage remained childless.

He was further honoured by being appointed vice-admiral of Leinster in 1602.

An anonymous manuscript originating from the library of the Irish College at Louvain tells us the following anecdote.

The 10th Earl of Ormond, as an old blind man, celebrated Christmas with his family at Carrick Castle. The adults sat at the table, while the children played on the floor around them. The Earl heard a noise behind him and asked who it was. He was told it was little Jemmy of Kilcash, Walter's grandson whipping his top. The Earl asked for the boy to be brought to him, held him on his lap, and caressed his hair. He sighed and said "My family shall be much oppressed and brought very low, but by this boy it shall be restored again and in his time be in greater splendour than ever it has been".

In 1613 his son-in-law Lord Tulleophelim died childless in his forties. A son of Lord Thomond asked for his widow Elizabeth's hand, but the King decided that she should marry Lord Dingwall, a favourite from his days in Scotland.

== Death and timeline ==
The tenth Lord Ormond died on 22 November 1614 at Carrick and was buried at St Canice's Cathedral, Kilkenny.

As the Earl died without legally recognised male issue, and his younger brother Edmund was attainted, the Earldom reverted in the male line, to the Kilcash cadet branch, which had started with the third brother John Butler of Kilcash and whose living representative was John's son Walter.

Timeline
As his birth date is uncertain, so are all his ages.
Age	Date	Event
0	1531, Feb, about	Born
−91	1539, 26 Aug	Father succeeded his grandfather as 9th earl.
13	1546, May	Left for London
−84	1546, 28 Oct	Father died poisoned in London
15	1547, 28 Jan	Accession of Edward VI, succeeding Henry VIII
15–16	1547, 20 Feb	Knighted at the coronation of Edward VI
16	1547, 10 Sep	Present at the Battle of Pinkie during the Rough Wooing
22	1553, 6 Jul	Accession of Mary I, succeeding Edward VI
23	1554, 10 Sep	Birth of his illegitimate son Piers FitzThomas Butler
27	1558, 17 Nov	Accession of Elizabeth I, succeeding Mary I
28	1559, 26 Aug	Appointed Lord Treasurer of Ireland by the Queen
27–28	1559, about	Married his 1st wife, Elizabeth Sheffield
33	1565, 2 Jan	Mother died
33–34	1565, 8 Feb	Battle of Affane
37–38	1569	Outbreak of the 1st Desmond Rebellion
39	1570, April	His brothers Edmund, Edward, and Piers attainted
47–48	1579	Outbreak of the 2nd Desmond Rebellion.
51	1582, 1 Sep	Estranged 1st wife died in Bristol.
51	1582, 9 Nov	Married his 2nd wife.
53–54	1585, about	Daughter born
57	1588, Aug	Carried the sword of state before the queen at her Tilbury speech
61–62	1593	Outbreak of Tyrone's Rebellion
69	1600, Nov	2nd wife died.
70	1601, Jun	Married 3rd wife
72	1603, 24 Mar	Accession of King James I, succeeding Elizabeth I
71–72	1603	Daughter married Theobald
74	1606, 17 Jan	Son Thomas died.
82	1613, early in	Son-in-law died
82–83	1614, autumn	Daughter married Richard Preston, Lord Dingwall
82–83	1614, 22 Nov	Died at Carrick-on-Suir

== Offices held ==
Included:

- Treasurer of Ireland (1559–1614)
- Lieutenant of County Tipperary (1575)
- Lieutenant of County Kilkenny (1575)
- Lord General of the Forces in Munster (1582–1583)
- General of the Forces in Leinster (1594–1596)
- Lieutenant-General of the all Forces in Ireland (1597)
- Vice-Admiral of Leinster (1602)

== Notes and references ==
=== Sources ===
- Bagwell, Richard (1909). Ireland under the Stuarts and under the Interregnum. Vol. I. London: Longmans, Green, and Co. OCLC 458582656. – 1603 to 1642
- Barron, Oswald (1911). "Butler" . In Chisholm, Hugh (ed.). Encyclopædia Britannica. Vol. 4 (11th ed.). Cambridge University Press. pp. 879–881.
- Burke, Bernard (1866). A Genealogical History of the Dormant, Abeyant, Forfeited and Extinct Peerages of the British Empire (New ed.). London: Harrison. OCLC 11501348.
- Burke, Bernard; Burke, Ashworth Peter (1909). A Genealogical and Heraldic History of the Peerage and Baronetage, the Privy Council, Knightage and Companionage (71st ed.). London: Harrison. OCLC 28297274.
- Carrigan, Rev William (1905). The History and Antiquities of the Diocese of Ossory. Vol. III. Dublin: Sealy, Bryers & Walker. OCLC 29384778. – The Middle Deanery
- Carte, Thomas (1851) [1st pub. 1736]. The Life of James Duke of Ormond. Vol. I (New ed.). Oxford: Oxford University Press. OCLC 1086656347. – 1613 to 1641
- Cokayne, George Edward (1895). Complete Peerage of England, Scotland, Ireland, Great Britain and the United Kingdom, Extant, Extinct, or Dormant. Vol. VI (1st ed.). London: George Bell and Sons. OCLC 1180818801. – N to R (for Ormond)
- Debrett, John (1828). Peerage of the United Kingdom of Great Britain and Ireland. Vol. II (17th ed.). London: F. C. and J. Rivington. OCLC 54499602. – Scotland and Ireland
- Dunboyne, Patrick Theobald Tower Butler, Baron (1968). Butler Family History (2nd ed.). Kilkenny: Rothe House.
- Edwards, David (1998). The Ormond Lordship in County Kilkenny, 1515–1642 (Ph.D.). Dublin: Trinity College. hdl:2262/77139. – (PDF downloadable from given URL)
- Edwards, David (2004). "Butler, Thomas, tenth earl of Ormond and third earl of Ossory (1531–1558)". In Matthew, Henry Colin Gray; Harrison, Brian (eds.). Oxford Dictionary of National Biography. Vol. 9. New York: Oxford University Press. pp. 220–225. ISBN 0-19-861359-8.
- Edwards, David (October 2009). McGuire, James; Quinn, James (eds.). "Butler, Thomas". Dictionary of Irish Biography.
- Fryde, Edmund Boleslaw; Greenway, D. E.; Porter, S.; Roy, I., eds. (1986). Handbook of British Chronology. Royal Historical Society Guides and Handbooks, No. 2 (3rd ed.). London: Offices of the Royal Historical Society. ISBN 0-86193-106-8. – (for timeline)
- Graves, James (1863). "Anonymous Account of the Early Life and Marriage of James, First Duke of Ormond". The Journal of the Kilkenny and South-East of Ireland Archaeological Society. New. 4 (2): 276–292. JSTOR 25502636.
- Joyce, Patrick Weston (1903). A Concise History of Ireland from the Earliest Times to 1837 (12th ed.). Dublin: M. H. Gill & Son. OCLC 815623752.
- Lee, Sidney (1886). "Butler, Thomas, tenth Earl of Ormonde (1532–1614)". In Lee, Sidney (ed.). Dictionary of National Biography. Vol. VIII. New York: MacMillan and Co. pp. 79–81. OCLC 8544105.
- Lodge, John (1789). Archdall, Mervyn (ed.). The Peerage of Ireland or, A Genealogical History of the Present Nobility of that Kingdom. Vol. IV. Dublin: James Moore. OCLC 264906028. – Viscounts
- McCormack, Anthony M. (2004). "FitzGerald, James fitz Maurice (d. 1579)". In Matthew, Colin; Harrison, Brian (eds.). Oxford Dictionary of National Biography. Vol. 19. New York: Oxford University Press. pp. 819–821. ISBN 0-19-861369-5.
- McCormack, Anthony M. (October 2009). McGuire, James; Quinn, James (eds.). "FitzGerald, Gerald fitz James". Dictionary of Irish Biography.
- McGurk, J. J. N. (2004). "FitzGerald, Gerald fitz James, fourteenth earl of Desmond (c. 1533–1583)". In Matthew, Colin; Harrison, Brian (eds.). Oxford Dictionary of National Biography. Vol. 19. New York: Oxford University Press. pp. 809–811. ISBN 0-19-861369-5.
- O'Mahany, Flora (2018). "Royalty, Ruin and Restoration". Irish Arts Review. 35 (2): 134–139. JSTOR 44972030. – Ormond Castle
- Weir, Alison (1999). Elizabeth the Queen. London: Pimlico. ISBN 0-7126-7312-1.

Peerage of Ireland
Preceded by James Butler	Earl of Ormond; Earl of Ossory; 1546–1614	Succeeded by Walter Butler
