= Benjamin Burton (politician, born 1709) =

Irish politician

Benjamin Burton (1709–1767) was an Irish politician.

Burton was born in Dublin and educated at Eton and Trinity College, Dublin.

Burton represented Knocktopher from 1741 until 1760 and County Carlow from 1761 until his death. He was Commissioner of Revenue for Ireland and a Privy Councillor.
