= William Henry Burton =

Irish politician

William Henry Burton (1739–1818) was an Irish politician.

Burton was born in County Carlow and educated at Kilkenny College and Trinity College, Dublin. He served as a captain in the 13th Dragoons from 1766 to 1770.

Burton represented Gowran from 1761 until 1768 and County Carlow from 1768 until 1802.
