= Sir Edmund Butler of Cloughgrenan =

Irish noble (1534–c. 1585)

Edmund Butler
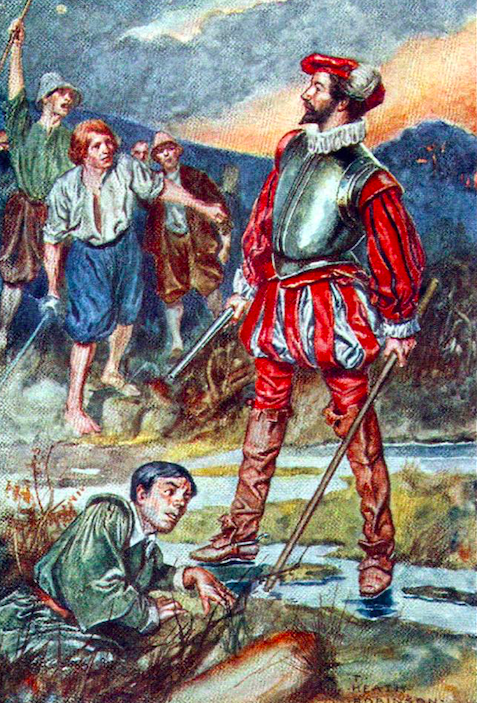
- Depiction of Butler in revolt
- Born: 1534
- Died: c. 1585; Inistioge, County Kilkenny, Ireland
- Buried: St Canice's Cathedral, Kilkenny
- Family: Butler dynasty
- Spouse: Eleanor Eustace
- Issue: Piers Butler; James Butler; Theobald Butler; Joan Butler; Katherine Butler; Thomas Butler
- Father: James Butler
- Mother: Joan Fitzgerald

Sir Edmund Butler (1534 – c. 1585) of Cloughgrenan (and the Dullough), was an Irish noble and the second son of James Butler, 9th Earl of Ormond and Lady Joan Fitzgerald. He was a scion of the House of Ormond, and a rebel against the Tudors.

== Life and career ==
In 1562, was in commission for presentation of the peace in County Carlow, during the Deputy's absence in the North against Shane O'Neill. He was knighted in 1567 and had a grant for the return of all Writs in the cantreds (baronies) of Oremond (Ormond Lower and Ormond Upper), Elyogerth (Eliogarty), and Elyocarrol (Ikerrin) in Tipperary.

=== Battle of Affane ===
During the Battle of Affane in 1565, Edmund wounded Gerald FitzGerald, 14th Earl of Desmond in the right hip with a pistol-shot, cracking his thigh-bone and throwing him from his mount. With their leader fallen, the Geraldine troops were routed and the Butlers, led by Edmund's brother Thomas Butler, 10th Earl of Ormond, pursued them to the riverbank killing about 300 Geraldines.

=== Butler Revolt ===
Butler revolt
- Part of Tudor conquest of Ireland
Date	1569 – 1570
Location	Provinces of Leinster and Munster, Ireland
Result	English victory

Belligerents
Butler Dynasty: Allied Gaelic and Norman clans	Kingdom of England: (Kingdom of Ireland) Loyalists

Commanders and leaders
Edmund Butler; Pierce Butler	Henry Sidney; Thomas Butler

His father died in London in 1546 when Edmund was about 12 years of age. By his father's will, he received the Dullough - the western part of the barony of Idrone, which, with the Roscrea property, was considered to be worth £400 yearly. The 9th Earl had purchased the Dullogh from the Kavanaghs who had been in occupation of the land since before the Norman invasion of Ireland. Sir Peter Carew put forward his claims in right of his ancestors, the lords of Idrone. It was in defence of this property that Sir Edmund came into conflict with the Government.

Edmund, then heir to his brother, earned renown when he led the Butler Revolt in 1569. Alongside his brothers Edward and Pierce, Edmund's rebellion was in direct response to the Lord Deputy of Ireland, Sir Henry Sidney who unjustly granted Edmund's lands in Idrone to the English adventurer Sir Peter Carew. Edmund and his brothers responded by raiding English settlements up and down the breadth of Leinster and were declared traitors by Sidney. This was all the more remarkable because the Butlers had long been famed for their strong loyalty to the Crown of England.

Eventually Edmund's brother, the Earl of Ormond, fearing for the future of his lands and titles, responded by joining his erstwhile enemy Sidney and marched against Edmund. Under pressure from Earl Thomas, he was attainted by Queen Elizabeth I. But on surrendering his estate to the Queen, 10 October 1570, he was pardoned, (together with his brothers Edward and Piers) dated at Gorhambury 12 March 1573, of all their treasons. While she agreed to save his life, Elizabeth did not remove the attainder on Edmund. His brothers Edward and Piers Butler remained with the Desmond forces.

Nevertheless, the indefatigable Edmund, with the help of Fiach MacHugh O'Byrne, escaped from Dublin Castle where he was imprisoned. He rather ungallantly fell from a rope hung from the battlements and was forced to spend the night roaming around in the castle fosse evading Sidney's troops.

Following his escape from Dublin, Edmund regained control of Cloughrenan once more, however, his holdings were in a ruinous state and he never lived there again. He remained at large until his death at Inistioge between 1580 and 1590. He is buried at St Canice's Cathedral in Kilkenny city.

=== Heirs and legacy ===
Some years after Edmund's death, Queen Elizabeth I reversed the attainder on his eldest son Piers, who was granted ancestral lands in Roscrea, County Tipperary. Both Piers and his brother James were executed at Thurles by their uncle Earl Thomas during another rebellion in 1596.

In 1602, Elizabeth also reversed the attainder on his last remaining legitimate son Theobald, who became the 1st Viscount of Tulleophelim and Governor of County Carlow. He was also survived by an illegitimate son Thomas who was made a Baronet of Cloughrenan by King Charles I in 1628. The Butlers remained in possession of Cloughrenan until 1715, when James Butler, 2nd Duke of Ormonde was attainted and the lands were granted to the Rochfort family.

== Marriage and issue ==
He married Eleanor Eustace the second daughter of Rowland Eustace, 2nd Viscount Baltinglass, sister to James (who was in rebellion against Queen Elizabeth, and died without issue). Their children were:

- Piers Butler (d.1596), who married Mary Butler, with issue.
- James Butler (d.1596)
- Theobald Butler (c. 1570-1613), created Viscount Butler of Tulleophelim in 1603. He married Lady Elizabeth Butler.
- Joan Butler, who married Teige Fitzpatrick, 4th Baron Upper Ossory.
- Katherine Butler, who married William Fitzjohn Eustace.
- Sir Thomas Butler, 1st Baronet of Cloughgrenan (c. 1578 – 1642) (illegitimate). He married Anne Bagenal, with issue.

== See also ==
Butler dynasty
