= Edward McParland =

Irish author and architectural history academic

- Born: Edward John McParland; 1 May 1943 (age 83)
- Occupations: Architectural historian, author

Academic background
- Education: Belvedere College; University College Dublin (Msc); Christ's College, Cambridge; Jesus College, Cambridge (PhD)

Edward Joseph McParland (born May 1943) is an Irish architectural historian and author. He was elected as Pro-Chancellor of University of Dublin, Trinity College in 2013, and continues to give lectures after his retirement in 2008. McParland is the co-founder of the Irish Architectural Archive which was established in 1976, and he has contributed extensively to architectural conservation in Ireland.

== Education ==
McParland attended Belvedere College before completing a Master of Science in mathematics at University College Dublin. He attended Christ's College, Cambridge to study Fine Arts starting in 1965, and was elected a fellow of Jesus College, Cambridge in 1971, before being awarded his PhD in 1975.

== Career ==
McParland's first post at Trinity College Dublin was as lecturer in the History of Art Department in 1973. He was elected Fellow in 1984, and appointed to the role of Pro-Chancellor in 2013, a post which he still holds in retirement.

McParland founded the National Trust Archive (NTA) with Nicholas Robinson in 1976, and at various times held the position of board member and Company Secretary.

He co-founded the Irish Landmark Trust, and serves on the committee of the Alfred Beit Foundation and the Irish Georgian Foundation.

He served as editor of the Carlovian, the journal of the Carlow Historical & Archaeological Society.

In 2016, McParland gave a talk on Sir Thomas Robinson who founded the Armagh Robinson Library.

McParland remains active in scholarly societies, including a role as vice-president of the Ulster Architectural Heritage Society, and a member of the Royal Irish Academy.

== Bibliography ==
=== Books ===
- Thomas Ivory, architect (Gatherum series), 1973, Gifford and Craven
- James Gandon: vitruvius hibernicus, 1985, A. Zwemmer
- The Royal Hospital, Kilmainham, Co. Dublin, 1988, Irish Architectural Archive (Dublin)
- A Bibliography of Irish Architectural History, 1989, Irish Historical Studies (Dublin)
- Public Architecture in Ireland 1680–1760, 2001, Yale University Press (new haven, London)

=== Co-written work ===
- Contributor to: Irish Provincial Cultures in the Long Eighteenth Century: making the middle sort, 2012, Four Courts Press (Dublin)
- Contributor to: The Old Library, Trinity College Dublin, 1712–2012, 2012, Four Courts Press (Dublin)
- Contributor to: The Building Site in Eighteenth-century Ireland by Arthur Gibney, 2017, Four Courts Press (Dublin)
- Contributor to: The Architecture of Richard Morrison (1767-1849) and William Vitruvius Morrison (1794-1838), 1989, Irish Architectural Archive (Dublin)

=== Databases and archives ===
McParland's research on "relating to the architecture of Ireland from the late seventeenth to the earl nineteenth century" is a principal source for entries in the Dictionary of Irish Architects.

Photographs by McParland are held in the Courtauld Institute of Art's Conway Library of art and architecture.

=== Articles ===
- The Office of the Surveyor General in Ireland in the Eighteenth Century, 1995, The Architectural History Journal, Society of Architectural Historians
- Public Architecture in Ireland 1680–1760, 2002, The British journal for eighteenth-century studies, Vol 25, Part 2, 2002, 297, Voltaire Foundation
- Public Architecture in Ireland 1680–1760, 2002, Studies: an Irish quarterly review of letters, philosophy, and science. Vol 91, ISSU 361, 2002, 79–82, Irish Jesuits
- McParland wrote the obituary for his colleague Anne Crookshank in the Burlington Magazine in 2017.

== Awards and recognition ==
In recognition of McParland's contributions to scholarship in Irish architecture, he was elected an Honorary Fellow of the Royal Institute of the Architects of Ireland, and made an Honorary Member of the Royal Society of Ulster Architects. He is a retired Fellow of the Society of Antiquaries of London.
