= Alistair John Rowan =

Irish historian, educator, and author

- Occupation: Academic
- Known for: Architectural history
- Spouse: Ann Martha Rowan (m. 1968; died 2024)
- Children: 1
- Relatives: Charlotte Roueché (sister-in-law)

Alistair John Rowan is an Irish architectural historian, a retired university teacher, a building conservationist and an author of British, Irish and Italian architectural history.

Rowan was an architectural writer with Country Life before 1967, when he became lecturer in Fine Art in the University of Edinburgh. Thereafter Rowan became the first professor of the History of Art in University College, Dublin (U.C.D.), and later Principal of Edinburgh College of Art. He was Slade Professor of Fine Art at the University of Oxford for 1988–89.

Photographs contributed by Rowan to the Conway Library are currently being digitised by the Courtauld Institute of Art, as part of the Courtauld Connects project. In 2018, Rowan and Ann Martha Rowan despoisted "The Alistair and Ann Martha Rowan Collection of Architectural Publications" at the Irish Architectural Archive.

Rowan has served on the Council of the National Trust for Scotland, on the Historic Buildings Council for Scotland and has been President of the Society of Architectural Historians of Great Britain and of the Architectural Heritage Society of Scotland.

== Personal life ==
On 20 July 1968, Rowan married the British archivist and editor Ann Martha Rowan, with whom he had a daughter. Rowan is the brother-in-law of the British academic Charlotte Roueché.

Rowan and his wife lived at 22 Leeson Park, Dublin for several decades.

== Books ==
- Alistair Rowan, Garden Buildings, The RIBA Drawings Series, London, Country Life Books, 1968
- Valerie Fiddes and Alistair Rowan, Mr. David Bryce, An Exhibition to mark the centenary of Scotland’s Great Victorian Architect, University of Edinburgh, 1976
- Alistair Rowan, North West Ulster: Londonderry, Donegal, Fermanagh, and Tyrone. Buildings of Ireland Series. Dublin: Penguin Books, 1979 (ISBN 978-0-300-09667-5)
- Alistair Rowan, The Creation of Shambellie: the story of a Victorian building contract, Edinburgh, Royal Scottish Museum, 1982
- Alistair Rowan, Designs for Castles and Country Houses by Robert & James Adam, Oxford, Phaidon Press Ltd, 1985 (ISBN 0-7148-2278-7)
- Alistair Rowan, Robert Adam, Catalogue of Architectural Drawings in the Victoria and Albert Museum, London, Victoria and Albert Museum, 1988 (ISBN 1-85177-070-4)
- Christine Casey and Alistair Rowan. North Leinster: the Counties of Longford, Louth, Meath and Westmeath. Buildings of Ireland Series. London: Penguin Books, 1993 (ISBN 978-0-300-09668-2)
- Alistair Rowan, ‘Bob the Roman’ Heroic Antiquity & the Architecture of Robert Adam, London, Sir John Soane's Museum, 2003 (ISBN 0-9542284-3-X)
- Alistair Rowan, Vaulting Ambition: The Adam Brothers, Contractors to the Metropolis in the reign of George III, London, Sir John Soane’s Museum, 2007 (ISBN 978-0-9549041-8-0)
- Susanna Pasquali and Alistair Rowan, Alessandro Papafava e la sua raccolta, Vicenza, Centro Internazionale di Studi di Architettura Andrea Palladio, 2019 (ISBN 978-88-3367-086-7)
- Kenneth Milne and Alistair Rowan, St. Bartholomew’s, A History of a Dublin Parish, Dublin, Hinds, 2019 (ISBN 978-1-909442-05-4)
