= W.E. =

2011 film by Madonna

- Theatrical release poster
- Directed by: Madonna
- Written by: Madonna; Alek Keshishian
- Produced by: Madonna; Kris Thykier
- Starring: Abbie Cornish; James D'Arcy; Andrea Riseborough; Oscar Isaac; Haluk Bilginer
- Cinematography: Hagen Bogdanski
- Edited by: Danny B. Tull
- Music by: Abel Korzeniowski
- Production companies: Semtex Films; IM Global
- Distributed by: StudioCanal (United Kingdom); The Weinstein Company (United States)
- Release dates: September 1, 2011 (Venice); December 9, 2011 (United States); January 20, 2012 (United Kingdom)
- Running time: 119 minutes
- Countries: United Kingdom; United States
- Languages: English; French
- Budget: £11 million ($17.62 million)
- Box office: $2 million

W.E. (stylised W./E.) is a 2011 historical romantic drama film written and directed by Madonna and starring Abbie Cornish, Andrea Riseborough, Oscar Isaac, Richard Coyle, and James D'Arcy. The screenplay was co-written by Alek Keshishian, who previously worked with Madonna on her 1991 documentary Truth or Dare and two of her music videos. Although the film was panned by critics and was a box office bomb, it received an Academy Award nomination for Best Costume Design. This marked Isaac's and Cornish's second film together after Sucker Punch.

The film tells the story of two women separated by over six decades. In 1998, lonely New Yorker Wally Winthrop is obsessed with Edward VIII's abdication of the British throne so he could marry American Wallis Simpson. But Wally's research, including several visits to Sotheby's auction of the Windsor estate, reveals that the couple's life together was not as perfect as she thought. Traveling back and forth in time, W.E. intertwines Wally's journey of discovery in New York with the story of Wallis and Edward from the early days of their romance to the unraveling of their lives over the following decades.

== Plot ==
Wallis "Wally" Winthrop is a young American housewife living in New York City in 1998. Although she is neglected, abused, and left sexually frustrated by William, her workaholic psychiatrist husband, she is comforted by the love story of Edward VIII and Wallis Simpson. Wally travels to the Sotheby's auction of the Windsor estate, which showcases items used by Wallis and Edward in their lifetime and evokes their relationship.

In 1930, Edward throws a party at his new home at Fort Belvedere in Windsor Great Park and meets Wallis through Lady Furness (his mistress). They are attracted to each other (despite Wallis' marriage to Ernest Simpson), and become lovers while Lady Furness is abroad. At Sotheby's Wally is interrupted by a guard, Evgeni, who is interested in her.

Edward and Wallis continue their affair while touring Europe, where he gives her jewels and adopts the initials W.E. By the end of 1934, Edward is obsessed with Wallis. He introduces her to his parents, King George V and Queen Mary, but she is criticized by Edward's sister-in-law Elizabeth. A distraught Wallis wants to end the relationship, but Edward pacifies her.

In New York, William refuses to conceive a child with Wally and she turns to in vitro fertilisation. Attracted to Evgeni, she goes on a date with him. Wally asks Evgeni about Edward and Wallis' story, pondering her relationship with William. After attending the auction at Sotheby's and spending ten thousand dollars, Wally returns home to a drunken William and they fight.

The National Government refuses to accept Edward's intention to marry Wallis because she is a divorcee. On the night of December 11, 1936, Edward announces by radio to the nation and the Empire that he is abdicating the throne in favour of his brother Bertie: "I have found it impossible to carry the heavy burden of responsibility and to discharge my duties as King, as I would wish to do, without the help and support of the woman I love." Wallis, who has fled to Villa Lou Viei near Cannes, hears the speech and reconciles with Edward.

Evgeni desperately tries to phone Wally. Racing to her apartment, he finds that she has been injured by William and brings her to his home in Brooklyn. As she recovers, Wally finds new hope with Evgeni and the courage to divorce William.

Reading a series of letters in billionaire Mohamed Al-Fayed's collection, Wally realises that Wallis was trapped in her relationship with Edward for the rest of her life. In an imaginary dialogue with Wallis, they discuss the similarity of their lives; in the end, only Wally finds happiness. Abandoning her fascination with Wallis and Edward's relationship, Wally learns from her doctor that she is finally pregnant.

== Cast ==
- Abbie Cornish as Wally Winthrop
- Andrea Riseborough as Wallis Simpson
- James D'Arcy as Edward VIII
- Oscar Isaac as Evgeni
- Richard Coyle as William Winthrop
- David Harbour as Ernest Simpson
- James Fox as George V
- Judy Parfitt as Queen Mary
- Haluk Bilginer as Mohamed Al-Fayed
- Geoffrey Palmer as Stanley Baldwin
- Natalie Dormer as Queen Elizabeth
- Laurence Fox as King George VI ("Bertie")
- Douglas Reith as Lord Brownlow
- Katie McGrath as Thelma, Lady Furness

== Production ==
=== Development ===
I directed Filth and Wisdom to teach myself about film-making ... And now, with this self-punishing process of being a producer and a writer and a director, I'm taking the next step.

— Madonna, on her decision to direct W.E.

Madonna had written the script for W.E. with director Alek Keshishian. Her husband Guy Ritchie helped her with the script and screenplay, advising her to meet with actors Mark Strong and Toby Kebbell (who had major roles in Ritchie's last film, RocknRolla). Madonna began writing W.E. after she finished directing Filth and Wisdom (2008). She had the idea for W.E. before Filth and Wisdom, but directed the latter because she felt that she lacked the experience to direct a big-budget film. Madonna described W.E. as a much bigger story:

There are more characters, and the three of them basically changed the course of British history. King Edward VIII abdicated the throne to be with an American woman, Wallis Simpson, and that's part of my story, so I've had to do an enormous amount of research and interview people. So I have an enormous responsibility to that, and then I have a responsibility to the actual auction, which really happened. Then there's the new story, the point of view, which is this girl who has this obsession and is going to the auctions and stuff. So it's a much more layered, complicated piece than Filth and Wisdom.

After the writing began, Madonna realised that she needed help due to the breadth of the subject. She enlisted Keshishian, who was well-acquainted with Madonna after directing the 1991 documentary Truth or Dare and two of her music videos. The writing process was dynamic, with Madonna and Keshishian emailing developed scripts, telephoning, and writing on each other's laptops. Although W.E. was initially reported as a musical about the Duke and Duchess of Windsor, Madonna said that the main story was not about them. It was about Wally Winthrop: a young, married New Yorker in 1998 who is obsessed with what she thought was the ultimate love story—Edward's abdication of the royal throne because of his love for Simpson. Simpson's character was a spiritual guide for Winthrop in the film. Its timeline ranges from pre-World War II England (1936–37) to 1998 New York City, and the storyline interweaves the two eras. Madonna decided to use the 1998 Sotheby's auction of Edward and Simpson's estate as a pivot point.

=== Inspiration ===
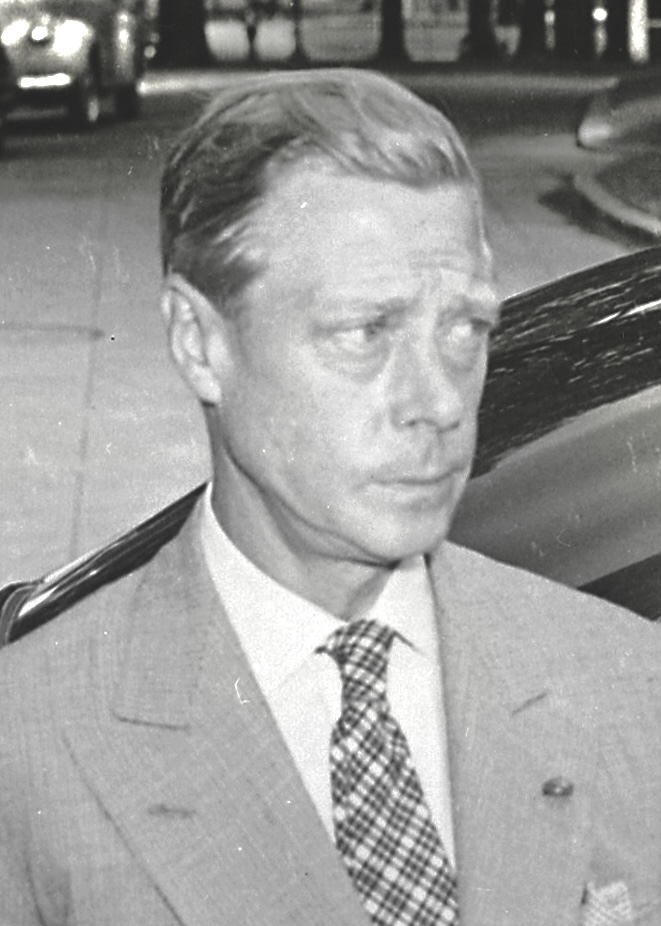
The abdication of Edward VIII, after which he married Wallis Simpson, was the basis of W.E.'s plot.

Madonna was inspired to direct the film by the controversial lives of Edward and Simpson. She said that if she brought up King Edward VIII and Wallis Simpson at a dinner party or other social gathering, "It's like throwing a Molotov cocktail into the room. Everyone erupts into an argument about who they were. I mean, they were very controversial – and continue to be. So, of course, I'm very attracted to that." Madonna studied the history of the abdication, and tried to understand what led Edward to give up the throne.

The singer spent two years researching Simpson's life and writing the script. She wallpapered an empty room in her house with pictures from auction catalogs and photographs of the Duke and Duchess at different ages. "I was sitting in a room that was completely and utterly inundated with their images so I could soak up their energy. I was trying to understand the nature of their love story and trying to figure out for myself if there is such a thing as perfect love," she said. Uninterested in a biopic about Simpson, Madonna created a modern-day story about Wally Winthrop to provide a point of view: "We can all read the same history book and have a different point of view. So it was important for me to not present the story and say, 'This is the one and only story,' but to say, 'This story moved me and inspired me.' That's how the two love stories were created."

One of the first characters Madonna developed for the film was Evgeni, a Russian immigrant living in Brooklyn and working in Manhattan. The character was inspired by Eugene Hütz, who played the lead role in Filth and Wisdom. Another motivation for the project was Edward and Simpson, who became the subject of media scrutiny and public vilification and were ostracised by the royal family. Madonna, interested in the cult of celebrity, found that many of the rumours surrounding Simpson's life were unfounded and wanted to portray Simpson as a human being with imperfections and a vulnerable side. "The message of the film is to realise that in the end happiness lies in your own head and that we are in fact in charge of our destiny," she said.

=== Casting ===
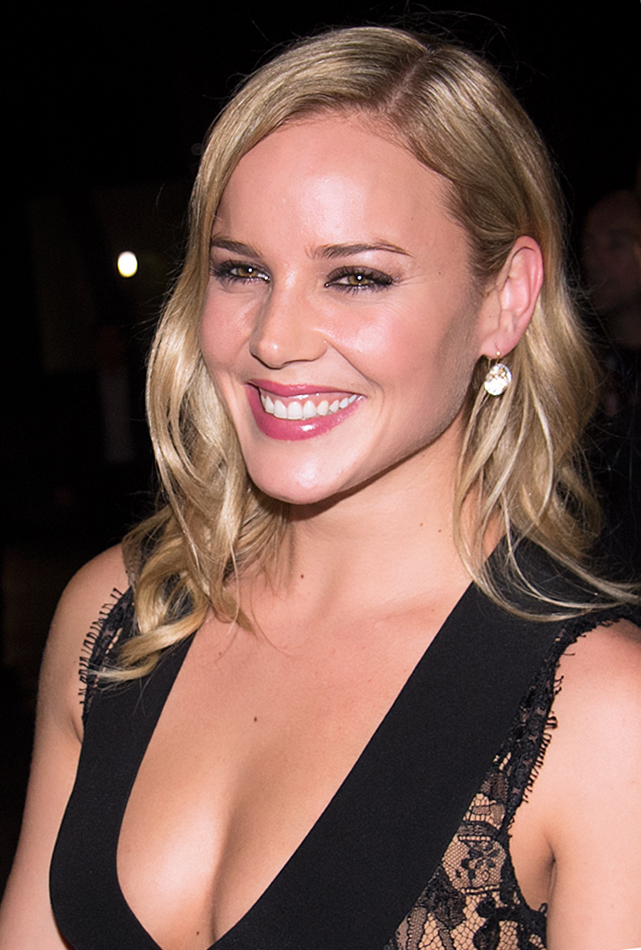
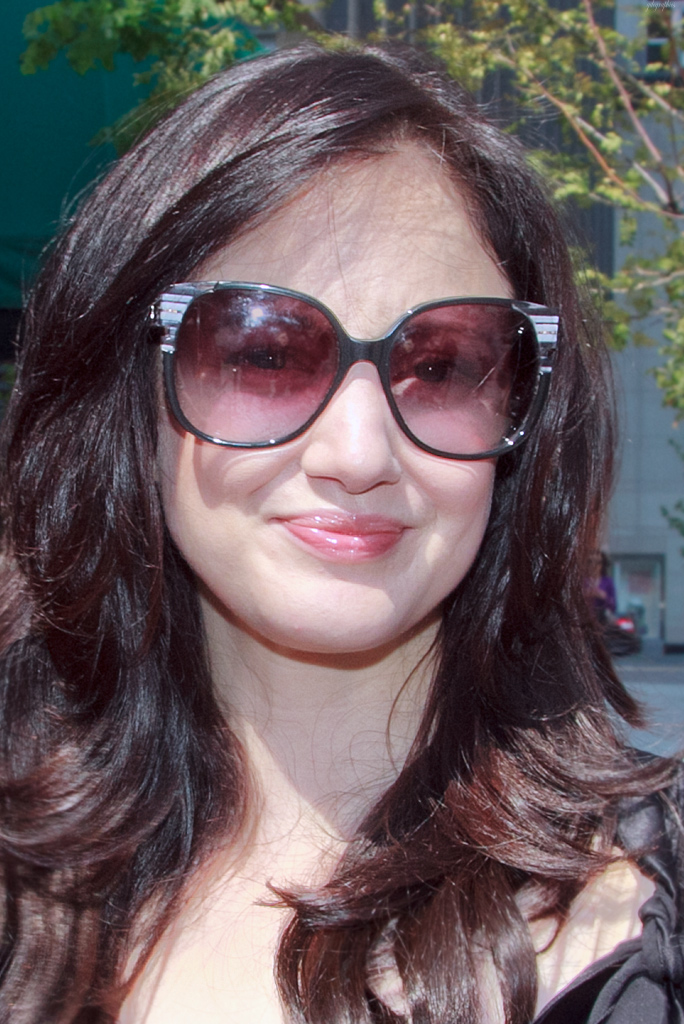
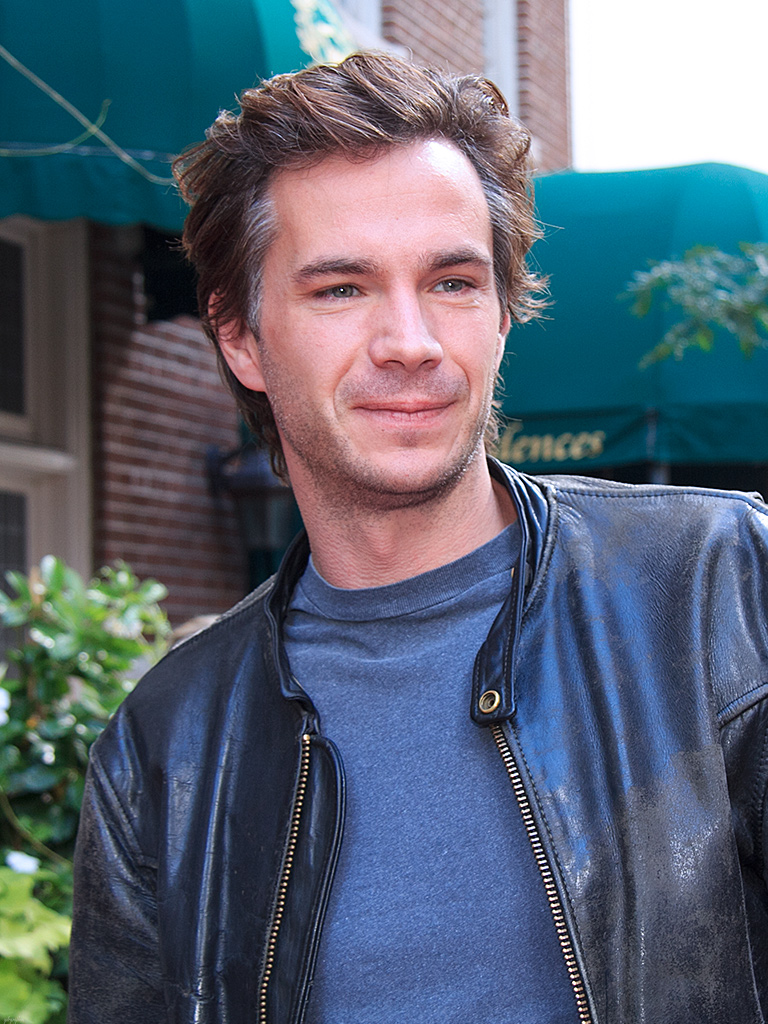
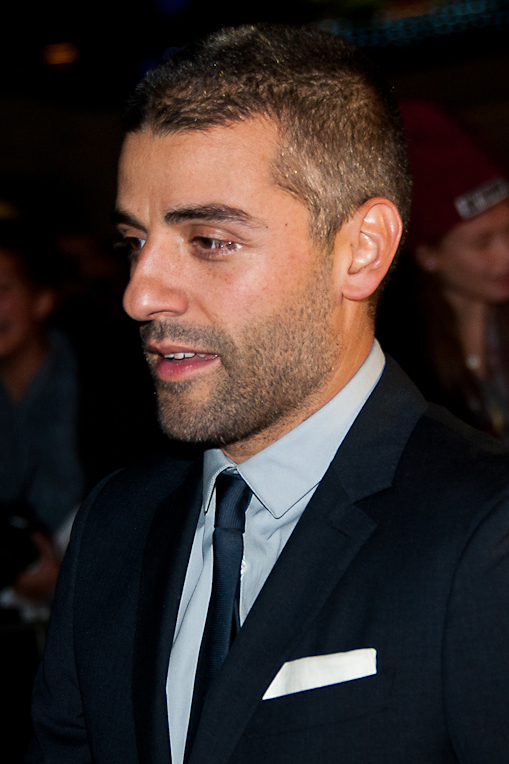
Clockwise from upper left: Abbie Cornish, Andrea Riseborough, Oscar Isaac and James D'Arcy

Madonna began work casting W.E. after returning from Africa, where she had been on vacation. She remembered finding the casting difficult since many refused to sign for a particular role. Madonna contrasted the process of film casting with recording a new album, where she can easily choose people with whom she wants to work. Abbie Cornish was signed to play Wally Winthrop, while King Edward VIII and Wallis Simpson were played by James D'Arcy and Andrea Riseborough. Evgeni was played by Oscar Isaac and Wally's husband, William, was played by Richard Coyle. Vera Farmiga was initially signed for the role of Simpson, but withdrew when she became pregnant.

The singer saw Riseborough as a young Margaret Thatcher in the BBC film, The Long Walk to Finchley, and wanted her to play Simpson: "I was looking for a certain quality: something fragile, androgynous and yet feminine in a really old-fashioned way. When I saw Andrea, I knew immediately she was the one". Cornish said about her role as Winthrop, "Madonna is a strong, independent woman who doesn't need a man to define her – and that's admirable. She's studied every aspect of what happened with Wallis Simpson and Edward VIII [...] It's a fascinating insight into class and romance. Madonna's created a contemporary woman—who I will play—called Wally, who is fascinated by what happened to Mrs. Simpson." Madonna's daughter Lourdes was offered a part, but the singer decided against the idea. However, she later allowed Lourdes to appear in the film as a young Wally Winthrop.

Ewan McGregor was offered the role of King Edward VIII, but he was replaced by James D'Arcy. Producer David Parfitt and casting director Nina Gold left W.E., with sources reporting that they had "creative differences" with Madonna and found that she struggled to "collaborate and delegate". Margo Stilley was signed to play Lady Thelma Furness but left the project, citing "artistic differences" with Madonna: "I had the role, but we had artistic differences. She (Madonna) is really something. I wish the cast luck because they are all really talented." She was replaced by Katie McGrath. Judy Parfitt was signed to play Queen Mary, and Geoffrey Palmer was cast as Stanley Baldwin. Real-life father and son James and Laurence Fox were signed as King George V and his son, Bertie (Edward's younger brother). The BBC reported that members of the London Welsh Center expressed an interest in appearing in a scene in which Edward is shocked by the living conditions in Welsh mining villages. A spokesperson for the centre, which was contacted by the film's casting agency, said: "I've had about 15 phone calls this morning, and yesterday was bedlam because everybody wants to be in a film with Madonna." The centre said that Welsh speakers were needed as extras in scenes of Edward's visits to the South Wales valleys in the 1930s.

Natalie Dormer was cast as the young Queen Elizabeth (Queen Mother). Dormer said about the role, "This country tends to remember the Queen Mother as a rather wrinkly 97-year-old, but I am playing her when she was quite an enchanting, engaging twenty- and thirty-something [...] She was quite a savage and savvy game player." Dormer's assessment of the role was noted by royal historian Hugo Vickers, who was asked by Madonna to advise her about the characteristics of members of the royal family and confirmed that Madonna depicted the Queen Mother as an unfavorable influence on the relationship between Edward VIII and Simpson.

=== Filming ===
Wanting W.E. to be as authentic as possible, Madonna wanted to film in locations where the royal family live. She moved to the United Kingdom, since the film would take six months to shoot. Madonna largely self-financed the film, which cost £11 million ($17.62 million). Filming began on July 5, 2010; locations included London and the home counties, with trips to New York and France. Scenes were filmed on the top two floors of the Abingdon Pub, followed by scenes at Club Quarters in Trafalgar Square. Filming was also done at Stoke Park, Buckinghamshire.

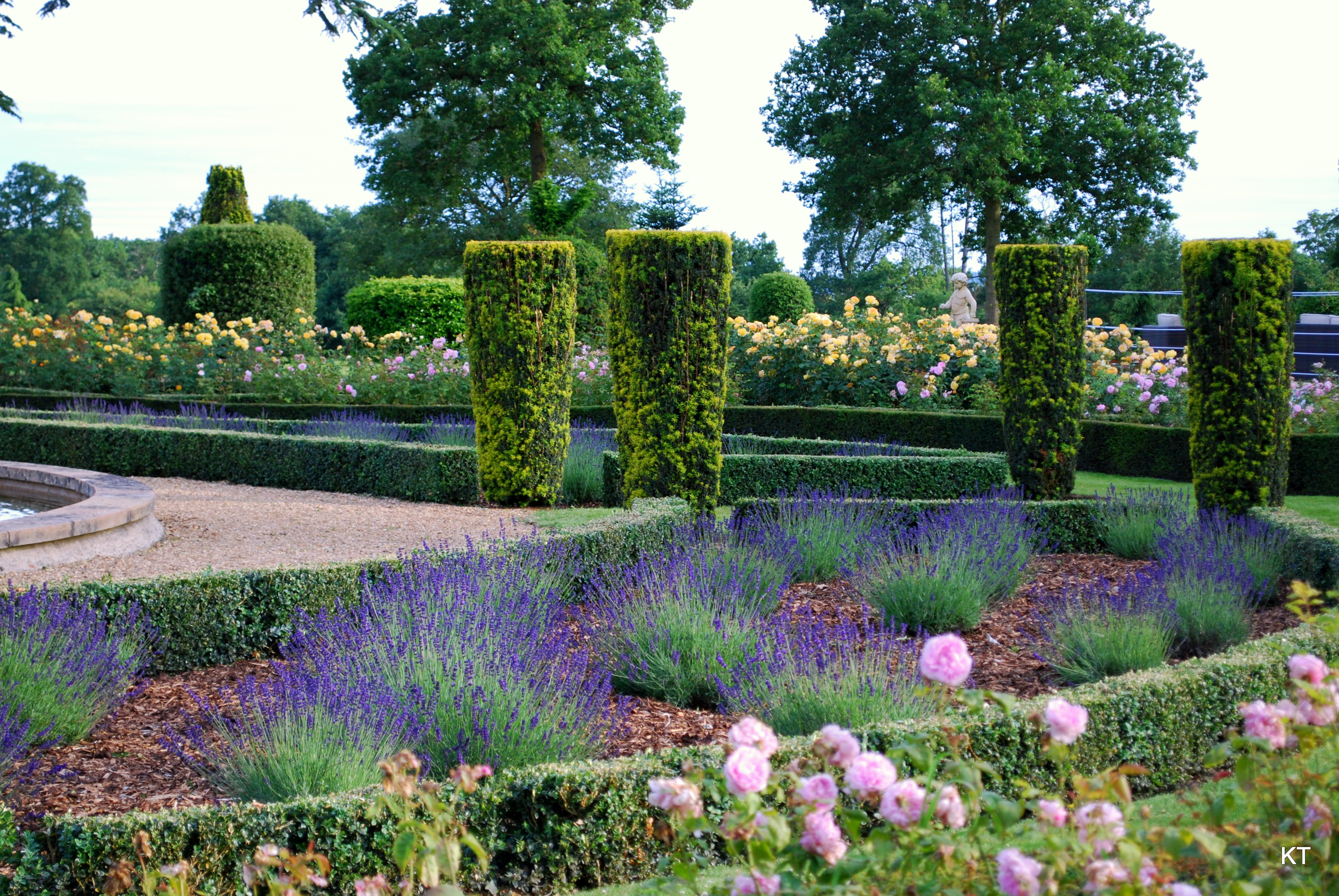
Stoke Park, Buckinghamshire, where exterior scenes were filmed

The production moved to France, where Madonna shot scenes with D'Arcy and Riseborough on Palm Beach in Marseille on July 29, 2010, and in Villefranche-sur-Mer on July 30. Scenes were filmed with Cornish at the Le Meurice hotel. While shooting with Riseborough, Madonna and her team asked Cartier to create copies of Simpson's extensive gem collection for the film. A bracelet slipped off Riseborough's wrist and was lost in the Mediterranean Sea, and Madonna ordered an immediate replacement. Designer Arianne Phillips described filming which included Simpson's original jewelry:

We were able to use archival pieces from Van Cleef & Arpels, which came with a revolving door of security guards. The jewelry schedule was very complicated, because pieces had to go from Switzerland to Paris, and the shooting schedule was changing constantly. It was really a house of cards. There were a couple of times we got caught, scenes got moved up, and lucky for me, Madonna was able to make available her personal jewelry. When you see Wallis spraying the flowers with perfume, her black and white pearl and diamond Bulgari earrings are Madonna's.

Filming moved to New York in September, where Madonna shot scenes in Brooklyn. D'Arcy had to dance a ballet in one scene; he did not know ballet, and Madonna asked him to learn the steps. According to D'Arcy, the scene was "this extraordinary beautiful dance with lifts and twirls and I can't do that, but you do because she [Madonna] somehow makes the impossible possible and it gives you amazing self-esteem when you do these things." Madonna also asked him to learn the bagpipes in six weeks and to ride horses.

=== Costumes ===
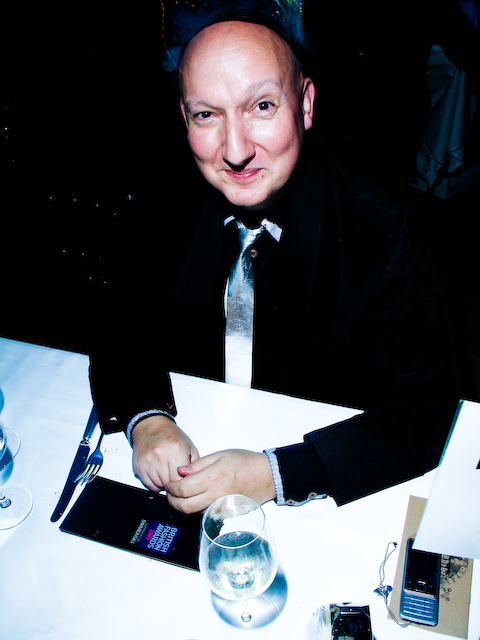
Milliner Stephen Jones provided the film's hats.

After finishing the script and starting work on casting and production, Madonna realised that the film's budget would be high. Simpson's character had about 80 costume changes, with dresses by designers such as Balenciaga, Christian Dior, Madeleine Vionnet, and Elsa Schiaparelli. Most of her actual dresses were in museums (and unobtainable by Madonna), but many of the couture houses offered to recreate the dresses for her. When she asked for a Michael O'Connor wedding dress (on display at the National Museum of Costume in Scotland) for a scene with Riseborough, museum general manager Margaret Roberts said that they were happy to send Madonna the dress: "Our Marriage in the Movies exhibition is packed with fabulous gowns that tell a story not only about the history of the period they represent, but also of Hollywood glamour and style [...] This is a dress that was made for the movies, so when we received the request from Madonna's production company, we were only too happy to oblige." Other fashion designers who worked on the film included John Galliano and Issa, who provided clothes; Pierre Cartier supplied the jewels, and Stephen Jones the hats.

Madonna enlisted costume designer Arianne Phillips to create the film's dresses. The costumes included vintage pieces; others were remade based on patterns obtained from the museum, and the rest were freshly made. In a November 2011 interview with W magazine, Philips said that she "started doing research in 2009, a year before [W.E.] began filming ... To me, Wallis Simpson was a style icon, but I didn’t know she was a couture client well before she met Edward. She was also a hungry whore for jewelry. Edward gave Wallis jewelry to make her feel royal. My first task was figuring out how to re-create those famous gifts." Madonna sent a box of her research to Phillips so the designer could get a head start on the project. The singer understood the attention to detail needed to create the costumes, drawing from her own clothing which included couture. Phillips researched the clothing on display at the fashion departments of the Metropolitan Museum of Art's Costume Institute in New York, the Musée de la mode et du textile in Paris, and the Victoria and Albert Museum in London. She then went to Los Angeles, where retailer Doris Raymond of The Way We Wore boutique opened her library of 1930s couture. There Phillips watched old newsreels from the University of California archives. When filming began, the designer moved into Madonna's guesthouse in London to watch the newsreels together and scrutinise the dresses. Phillips contacted designers such as Cartier and Van Cleef & Arpels to replicate a cross bracelet and ten other pieces. For the gowns, undergarments, and dresses needed for Simpson's 60 costume changes in the film, Phillips scoured the archives of Vionnet and Schiaparelli and redesigned Simpson's clothing. Riseborough's first dress in the film was a re-creation of a dress owned by Simpson. Phillips accessorized one dress with an organza skirt and a diamond-bow brooch at the neck and obtained duplicates of others from the Cos Prop costume store in London.

Some of the pieces that the duchess actually ordered I thought were hideous. Those wouldn’t work for the movie, so we modified and invented. Wallis wasn’t pretty; she was handsome, at best. In England, it was noted over and over how unattractive she was. But Wallis was a lot of fun—very entertaining. She had a freedom to her that was definitely reflected in her clothes; the duchess was all about presentation. And that became her refuge and her prison.

According to Phillips, Edward's choice of clothes was specific and he rebelled against what his father dictated as the protocol for dress; he wore navy-blue tails (instead of black) as formal wear. The designer saw his original clothing at the National Museum of Costume. To re-create the look, Phillips contacted the luxury goods company Alfred Dunhill, which understood the bespoke tailoring available in London's Savile Row. Dunhill provided Phillips with a tailor and fabrics from the mills which had created Edward's original fabrics. Phillips tailored the baggy look of the 1930s suits to make them appealing to a contemporary audience. All the costumes were hand-made, with a total of 60 costumes created for Simpson and 30 for Edward.

=== Music and soundtrack ===
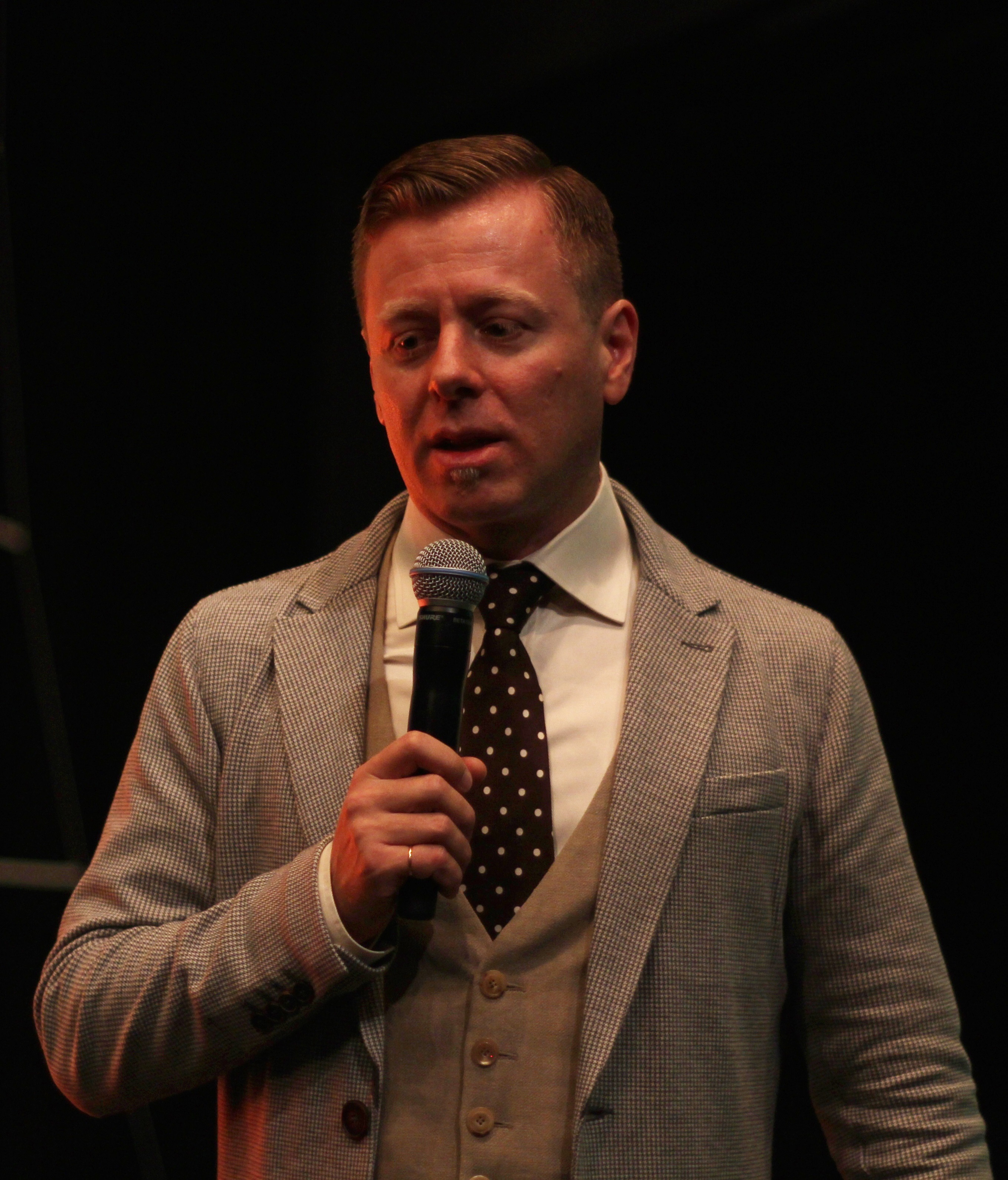
The film's soundtrack was composed by Abel Korzeniowski and recorded at Abbey Road Studios in London in April 2011.

Polish composer Abel Korzeniowski composed the film's music. Madonna had heard Korzeniowski's work on the soundtrack of the 2009 drama film, A Single Man. The singer remembered being "struck by the score's 'bittersweet' qualities, this melancholic, romantic, sweeping emotional kind of heartbreaking beauty." She asked A Single Man director, fashion designer Tom Ford, about Korzeniowski and decided to sign him to compose W.E.'s score. Madonna had incorporated parts of A Single Man's score into the screenplay and rough cut of W.E. The score features strings, electric guitar, harp, viola and piano, and the combination of instruments was used to bridge the film's two time periods.

Korzeniowski and conductor Terry Davies recorded a 60-piece orchestra at London's Abbey Road Studios in April 2011, concentrating on the characters' emotional states; he was not very concerned with differentiating the film's time periods. The composer said in a Variety interview that for the scenes featuring Simpson, he tried to make the score more modern than for those with Winthrop. Madonna wanted Korzeniowski to keep the score simple and direct, thinking that as a classically trained musician he would overcomplicate the score. "It is not the type of score where you go through crazy harmonic changes and modulations," said the composer. "This was one of the very precise notes I got from Madonna, that I was not supposed to over-think this music." The score was inspired by the film's irrational love, which Korzeniowski said could be "just an illusion". He wanted the music to reflect the film's powerful and conflicting emotions through the melodies, which alternated between despair and sorrow and hope and joy.

Madonna contributed "Masterpiece", a new song produced by William Orbit which she co-wrote with Julie Frost and Jimmy Harry, to the soundtrack. In the song, she sings about the pain of being in love with someone who is a great work of art: "If you were the Mona Lisa/ You'd be hanging in the Louvre/ Everyone would come to see you/ You'd be impossible to move." A Billboard writer described "Masterpiece" as a "slowed-down, moody ballad" which was "simple, direct and reminiscent of her sound in the 1990s". Its lyrics echo the film's love story: "And I'm right by your side/ Like a thief in the night/ I stand in front of a masterpiece/ And I can't tell you why it hurts so much to be in love with a masterpiece." The song plays over W.E.'s end credits and was later included on Madonna's album, MDNA. The soundtrack was released digitally through Interscope Records on January 31, 2012.

== Promotion and release ==
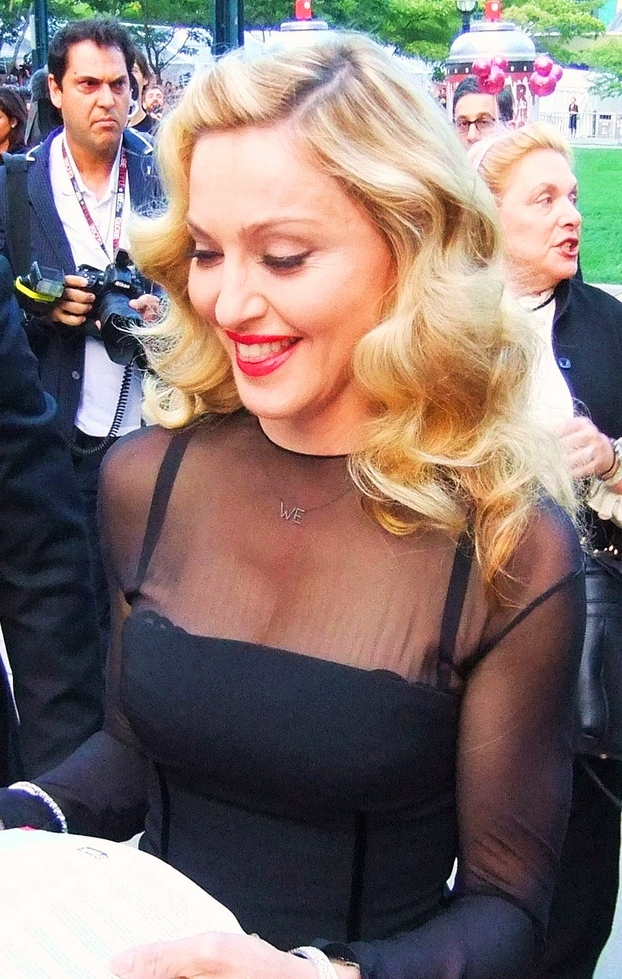
Madonna at the premiere of W.E. at the 2011 Toronto International Film Festival

In February 2011, Madonna held a private screening of the film's trailer at the Berlin International Film Festival. The screening, which included a question-and-answer session with the singer, was intended to sell the film to distributors. Its rights were sold to Optimum Releasing for the UK market, the Weinstein Company for the United States release, and Village Roadshow for Australia and New Zealand. Weinstein promoted the film as Madonna's first full-length directorial film; the company considered the 81-minute Filth and Wisdom (her previous film) a short film. Although Madonna hoped to premiere the film at the 2011 Cannes Film Festival, it was not ready in time. W.E. was shown at the Venice Film Festival on September 1, 2011, with Madonna and the principal cast attending the premiere. The film was also shown at the 2011 Toronto International Film Festival that month. Stills from W.E. were published in the September 2011 issue of Vanity Fair magazine.

In the film poster, D'Arcy carried Riseborough on his back in a romantic pose. David Wharton of Cinema Blend said that although the poster was "artfully" done, "It's the sort of thing the movie industry does all the time on their posters, just like the 'floating heads' trope or the 'looking through somebody's legs' pose [...] but I'm a sucker for a well-done movie poster, and this just seems lazy." A second poster was released, featuring Riseborough and D'Arcy as Wallis and Edward about to kiss on a beach. In January 2012, Madonna appeared on two television shows and talked about the film. She first appeared on ABC's Nightline, where she chatted with host Cynthia McFadden about W.E. Madonna then appeared on The Graham Norton Show with D'Arcy and Riseborough. The film premiered on January 11, 2012, in the UK and on January 23 in the US.

The Weinstein Company announced in June 2011 that it planned to release W.E. in New York and Los Angeles on December 9, 2011, expanding to additional markets during the month before a wide mid-January release. After the film's screenings at the Venice and Toronto film festivals, Weinstein decided to cut its running time by about ten minutes. Its planned release was changed to a limited, one-week run beginning on December 9, 2011, before a worldwide release on February 3, 2012.

== Reception ==
=== Critical response ===
After its premiere at the Venice Film Festival, W.E. divided critics before being panned upon the U.S. theatrical release. On Rotten Tomatoes, the film has a score of 12% from 111 reviews and an average rating of 4.24/10. The critical consensus reads; "W.E. exhibits director Madonna's keen eye for striking style, but this shallow biopic is too enamored with aesthetics to offer any insight into its subject." It has a Metacritic score of 36 out of 100, indicating generally unfavorable reviews. According to Steve Pond of Reuters, W.E. probably would not help in "turning Madonna's faltering movie career". Kyle Buchanan of New York wondered if W.E. would be a front-runner at the Golden Raspberry Awards. David Gritten of The Daily Telegraph gave the film three stars and a mixed review: "W.E. is a bold and confident story about an American woman's obsession with the Windsors". Gritten praised Riseborough and Cornish's performances, but thought that the film looked like a commercial for expensive items and fashion and appealed only to younger women.

Xan Brooks of The Guardian gave the film one star, describing it as "a primped and simpering folly, the turkey that dreamed it was a peacock." Todd McCarthy of The Hollywood Reporter wrote that the film resembled a documentary about a woman on a shopping expedition, and found Wally and Evgeni's affair particularly dreary. Oliver Lyttelton of IndieWire also criticized the film, saying that "the use of music is horrible" and "We've never looked forward to Madonna going back on tour more, if only because it means that we'll know, for certain, that she won't be using that time to direct another movie." Although Mark Adams of Screen Daily singled out Riseborough's performance as a highlight, he found the film disappointing overall. Leslie Felperin of Variety was also disappointed in the film, writing that it was "burdened with risible dialogue and weak performances". More attention was paid to the costumes than to the story, which she felt had much potential. Colin Kennedy of Metro called the film "disastrous", and its "judicious casting and handsome design [were] marred by a callow director's shaky shot selection". Simon Reynolds of Digital Spy described the film as "impeccably turned out with exquisite costume design", but felt that it was "barely enough to disguise its wildly inconsistent tone, chop-change visual style and snoozy performances." Dan Carrier of Camden New Journal gave the film one star out of five, calling W.E. "a horrible film to watch" and saying that Madonna "should never be allowed to go anywhere near a director’s camera again."

Diego Costa of Slant Magazine gave the film three out of four stars. He called W.E. "a shameless visual pleasure" and a "perfectly fine piece of oneiric cinema", praising Madonna's direction and Korzeniowski's music. Damon Wise of Empire gave the film three out of five stars and noted the harsh criticism of Madonna: "A lot has been said about Madonna and her new film — about how bad and inept it is, as if it's somehow worse than 99 percent of the other movies released weekly. That's right: up there with Showgirls. Let's give the director a break here." He praised Riseborough's performance and said, "In the short term, this will see W.E. dismissed as a vanity project but, in the long term, history may well find it to be a fascinating comment on 20th-century celebrity from the ultimate insider."

=== Box office ===
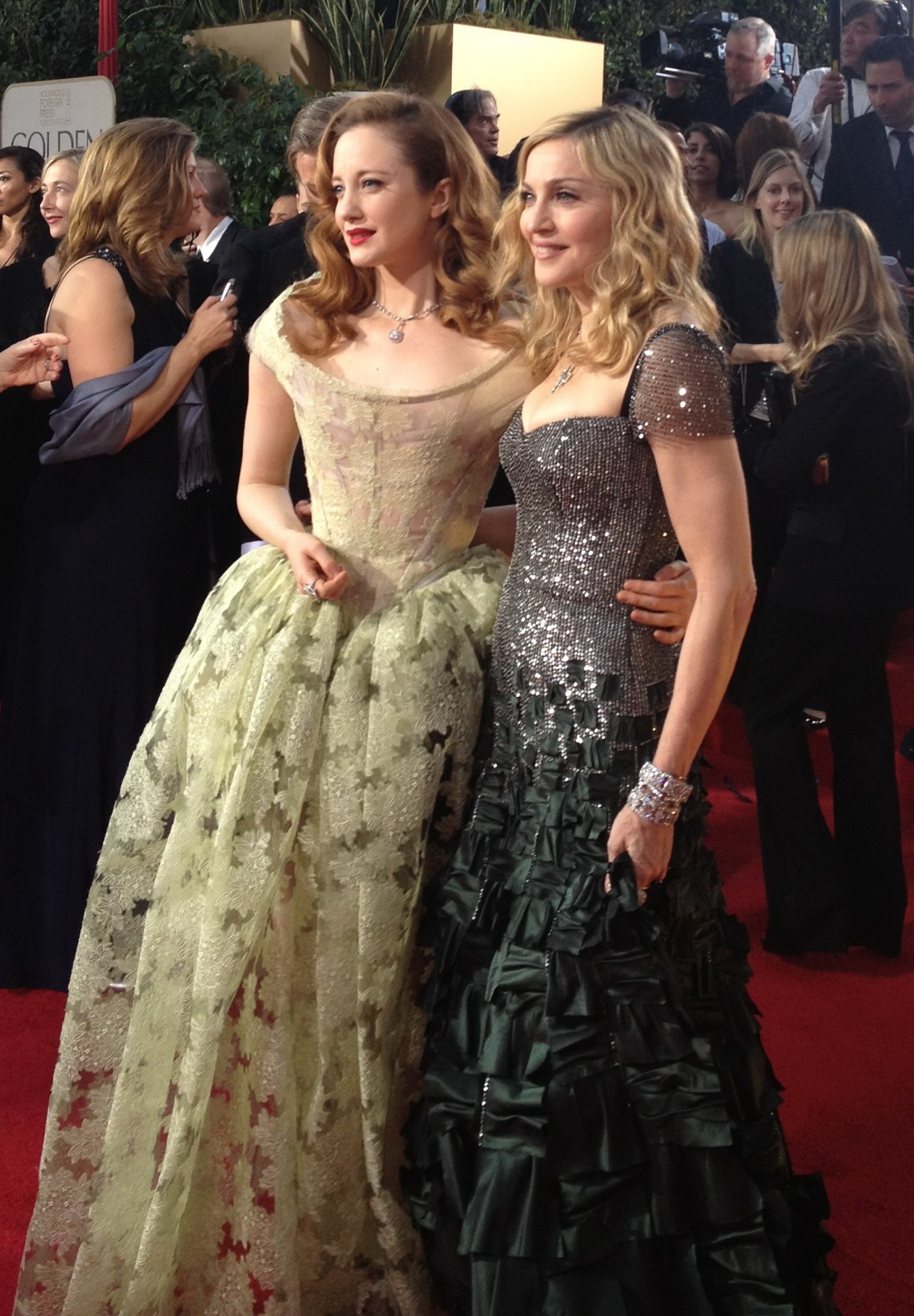
Andrea Riseborough and Madonna at the 69th Golden Globe Awards

Globally, the film was a commercial failure. In the United Kingdom, W.E. opened in 172 cinemas and grossed £183,000 (including advance screenings). Despite its limited release, it was the week's 14th-top-grossing film and peaked at number 20 in its first week of UK DVD sales.

=== Accolades ===
At the 69th Golden Globe Awards, W.E. won Best Original Song for "Masterpiece" and Korzeniowski was nominated for Best Original Score. Although "Masterpiece" was shortlisted for the Best Original Song award at the 84th Academy Awards, it was ultimately ineligible. According to Academy of Motion Picture Arts and Sciences rules, a song cannot compete for the award if it appears after the film's closing credits have begun, and "Masterpiece" does not begin playing until more than one minute into the credits. Arianne Phillips won the CDG Award for Excellence in Period Film at the 14th Costume Designers Guild Awards and was nominated for the Academy Award for Best Costume Design.
