= Niall Montgomery =

Irish architect, artist and poet

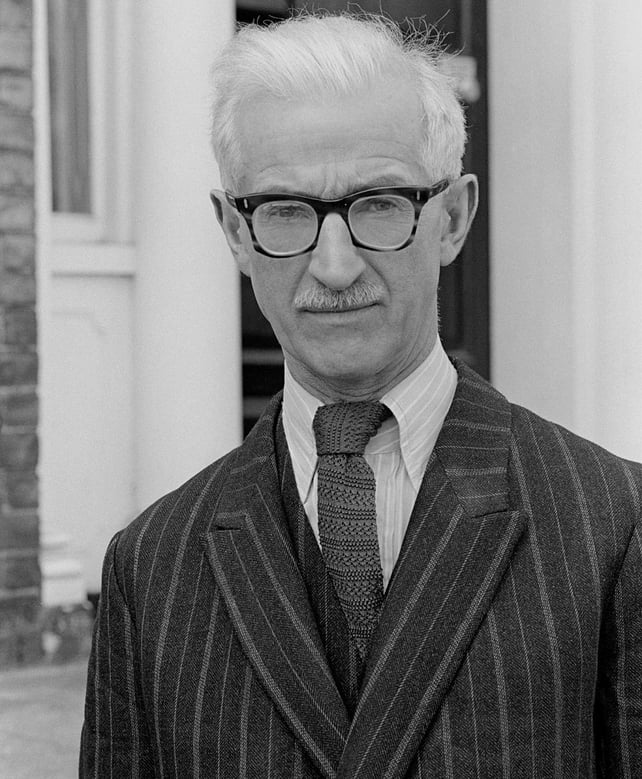
Photo of Irish Architect Niall Montgomery, taken by RTE in 1973

Niall Thomas Neil Montgomery (24 June 1915 – 11 March 1987) was an Irish architect, artist, poet, playwright, translator, and literary critic. He was a pioneering advocate for architectural conservation in Dublin and an early scholarly authority on James Joyce and Samuel Beckett. Montgomery was also active in the Irish artistic scene through his painting, exhibitions, and audio visual works.

== Early life and education ==
Niall Montgomery was born to James and Ethel Montgomery (née Conroy) on 24 June 1915 in a nursing home at 54 Upper Mount Street, Dublin. His father, James, served as Ireland's first film censor and was connected to prominent Irish cultural figures including W. B. Yeats and Arthur Griffith. Montgomery was raised in Booterstown, Co. Dublin alongside his half-sister by his father's first marriage.

Montgomery attended the Coláiste na Rinne primary boarding school in Ring, Co. Waterford, and Belvedere College, Dublin. In 1938, he graduated with a degree in architecture from University College Dublin (UCD). During his college years, he became friends with fellow literary figures Brian O'Nolan (Myles na gCopaleen), Denis Devlin, Niall Sheridan, Donagh MacDonagh, Cyril Cusack, and Samuel Beckett, and helped lead UCD's Literary and Historical Society and Dramatic Society.

== Architectural career ==
After graduating, Montgomery joined the Office of Public Works and worked with Desmond FitzGerald on the design of the new airport buildings at Collinstown (later Dublin Airport) in the late 1930s.

From 1946, he practised privately in Dublin and from 1974 partnered with his son, James Montgomery.

Notable projects include:

- Conversion of the Ormonde Castle stables into the Kilkenny Design Centre (1963), for which he received the inaugural Conservation Medal of the Royal Institute of the Architects of Ireland in 1976.
- Conversion of Kilkea Castle, Co. Kildare into a hotel (1966).

He was a leading voice in conservation, actively campaigning—through lectures, writings, and television appearances—for the protection of Dublin's historic architecture.

Other roles:

- Served on the Council of the Royal Institute of the Architects of Ireland for an unprecedented 31 consecutive years (1951–1982), serving as president from 1976 - 1978.
- Co founding member of the Irish Architectural Archive.
- Member of the National Monuments Advisory Council, the Arts Council, national building specifications committee, and the Cultural Relations Committee of Ireland's Department of Foreign Affairs.

== Artistic practice ==
Montgomery was a prolific visual artist who regularly exhibited his paintings, drawings, and kinetic works.

- Exhibited six times at the Irish Exhibition of Living Art between 1964 and 1978; he won first prize in 1973 for an audio visual installation.
- His kinetic piece was loaned to Dublin's Hugh Lane Gallery in 1975.

Held solo exhibitions at the Peacock Theatre:

- 1972: one man painting and drawing show.
- 1980: Niall Montgomery: Etchings, Drawings, Inventions (75 works exhibited).

== Literary career ==
In the collection of essays "Flann O'Brien - problems with authority", Ruben Borg, Paul Fagan and John McCourt highlight that while in University in UCD, Montgomery's played a key role in the short-lived but influential satirical magazine Blather (1934–35), which he co-founded with Brian O'Nolan (Flann O'Brien) and Niall Sheridan. The magazine featured anarchic, surreal humour and was a precursor to the style that would define O'Nolan's later writing. Montgomery was a regular contributor and co-conspirator in what the editors of Problems with Authority describe as "an arrogant and depraved body of men" who wielded parody, irony, and absurdity to challenge cultural and political authority in Ireland.

Montgomery's contributions to Blather and the broader literary network of O'Nolan place him at the heart of a significant anti-establishment literary movement in 1930s and 40s Dublin. His collaborations challenged the then-prevailing Irish cultural nationalism and high seriousness of literary tradition, instead embracing an experimental, comedic, and defiant tone.

=== Poetry and plays ===
Montgomery published poetry widely in literary magazines such as 'transition' and anthologies like 'Irish Poetry: The Thirties Generation'.

Late in life, he compiled his verse in terminal 1: Arrivals, edited by Joseph LaBine, planned for posthumous release. Montgomery died before publication in 1987.

He also wrote plays, though fewer details survive in public records.

=== Literary criticism ===
A leading Joyce scholar in Ireland, Montgomery was among the first to critically examine Finnegans Wake. His study "Joyeux Quicum Ulysse" appeared in Envoy in 1951, followed by "The Pervigilium Phoenicis" in New Mexico Quarterly in 1953.

Flann O'Brien admired this work, quipping that Finnegans Wake served as a gloss on Montgomery's article, and that henceforth the book would be seen as an introduction to the critique.

Montgomery's essay "No Symbols Where None Intended" (1954) introduced Samuel Beckett, with Beckett's approval, to American readers in New World Writing. Speaking of Montgomery's work, Beckett said "I learned a lot about myself I didn't know and hadn't suspected".

He also contributed essays comparing James Joyce and Marcel Proust to The Dubliner in 1962.

In journalism, he wrote book reviews and obituaries for The Irish Times. His satirical column "Cruiskeen Lawn" appeared under Brian O'Nolan's byline. In 1964, he authored a weekly column under the pseudonym 'Rosemary Lane' titled "The Liberties".

Montgomery also translated modern French poetry into English and Irish, with over 200 pages of translations now held in the National Library of Ireland.

Montgomery also took part in a well-documented series of prank letters to The Irish Times, alongside O'Nolan and Sheridan. These were signed with fictitious names such as "Whit Cassidy", "Judy Clifford", "F. O'Brien", and even chemical formulas like "Na_{2}CO_{3}" and "CuSO_{4}" to lampoon the literary establishment, especially figures like Seán Ó Faoláin and Frank O'Connor.

=== Legacy and archives ===
Montgomery's papers are preserved in two major Irish institutions:

- Literary and personal papers: National Library of Ireland.
- Architectural records: Royal Institute of the Architects of Ireland.

A collection of his writings on Dublin's architecture and Irish modernist literature was slated for posthumous publication (as of 2015).

== Personal life and death ==
Montgomery married Róisín Hopkins. They had four children: Rose Mary, Susan, Ruth, and James.

He died in Dublin on 11 March 1987 in the Adelaide Hospital, after a short illness. According to Flat Singles Press, Montgomery had planned terminal 1: Arrivals, but did not complete it before his passing.

== Selected works ==
=== Poetry ===
- terminal 1: Arrivals (edited by Joseph LaBine; published posthumously 2025).
- Contributed to transition; included in Irish Poetry: The Thirties Generation.

=== Literary criticism ===
- "Joyeux Quicum Ulysse" (Envoy, 1951)
- "The Pervigilium Phoenicis" (New Mexico Quarterly, 1953)
- "No Symbols Where None Intended" (New World Writing, 1954)

=== Architectural conversion projects ===
- Kilkenny Design Centre (conversion), 1963
- Kilkea Castle Hotel conversion, 1966

== Recognition and impact ==
Montgomery was one of the first champions of architectural conservation in Ireland and helped lay the groundwork for heritage preservation through advocacy and scholarly work. His multi-disciplinary contributions—spanning visual arts, literature, architecture, and criticism—remain in Ireland's institutional collections and literary heritage.

In "An Irishmans's Diary" Frank McNally described Montgomery as Irelands "greatest Joycean critic of his era", highlighted is contributions to Irelands national architecture and quoted Montgomery's friend, Edward McParland, as saying "there was nothing noticeably ordinary about him". In 2015 his former student, Christine O'Neill, wrote a book "Niall Montgomery - Dublinman" which is largely sourced via his 'voluminous records'.
