= Nicholas Robinson (historian) =

Irish historian, solicitor and cartoonist

- Born: Nicholas Kenneth Robinson; 9 February 1946 (age 80); Dublin, Ireland
- Education: Trinity College Dublin
- Spouse: Mary Bourke (m. 1970)
- Children: 3

Nicholas Kenneth Robinson (born 9 February 1946) is an Irish author, historian, solicitor and cartoonist who is the husband of the 7th President of Ireland and former United Nations High Commissioner for Human Rights, Mary Robinson.

== Background ==
Robinson was born in Dublin, Ireland, in 1946, to a wealthy middle-class Anglican family. He was born to Howard and Lucy Robinson, the third in a family of four boys. His father was an accountant who founded the City of Dublin Bank and was a prominent freemason of the Grand Lodge of Ireland. The Robinson family had been coopers associated with the brewing business of the Guinness family. Nicholas's grandfather was a coal importer.

While studying for a law degree at Trinity College Dublin, he began a relationship with his future wife Mary Robinson (née Bourke), who would later become the President of Ireland. With his wife Mary, he has one daughter and two sons.

== Career ==
Robinson has helped establish numerous bodies, among them the Irish Architectural Archive (with Edward McParland), the Birr Scientific and Heritage Foundation, the Irish Landmark Trust (of which he is a Trustee, ex officio President & Patron), and (with his wife Mary) the Irish Centre for European Law at Trinity College. He spent 30 years curating a collection of social and political caricatures which he presented to the Library of Trinity College Dublin in 1996.

== Works ==
His books include:

- Vanishing Country Houses of Ireland, with the Knight of Glin and David Griffin (Irish Architectural Archive/Irish Georgian Society, 1988)
- Edmund Burke: a Life in Caricature (Yale University Press, 1996)
- Caricature and the Irish: satirical prints from the Library of Trinity College Dublin, c.1780–1830 (Four Courts Press, 2024)

== Sources ==
- Olivia O'Leary & Helen Burke, Mary Robinson: The Authorised Biography, Lir/Hodder & Stoughton, 1998 (ISBN 0-340-71738-6)
