= Ann Martha Rowan =

British archivist and editor (1938–2024)

- Born: Ann Martha Wrinch; 9 November 1938; London, UK
- Died: 30 July 2024 (aged 85); Blackrock Clinic, Blackrock, Dublin, Ireland
- Organisation: Irish Architectural Archive
- Known for: Dictionary of Irish Architects
- Spouse: Alistair John Rowan (m. 1968)
- Children: 1
- Relatives: Charlotte Roueché (sister)

Ann Martha Rowan (née Wrinch; 9 November 1938 – 30 July 2024) was a British archivist and editor active in Ireland. Rowan worked for 30 years at the Irish Architectural Archive, where she created and edited the Dictionary of Irish Architects. In 2018, Rowan received an honorary Master's from Trinity College Dublin. The same year Rowan and Alistair John Rowan deposited "The Alistair and Ann Martha Rowan Collection of Architectural Publications" at the Irish Architectural Archive.

Rowan was born Ann Martha Wrinch on 9 November 1938 in London, and was the elder sister of the academic Charlotte Roueché. On 20 July 1968, Rowan married the Irish architectural historian Alistair John Rowan, with whom she had a daughter.

Rowan and her husband lived at 22 Leeson Park, Dublin for several decades.

On 30 July 2024, Rowan died at the Blackrock Clinic in Blackrock, Dublin aged 85.
