= Wicklow Head =

Headland in Ireland

- Ceann Chill Mhantáin
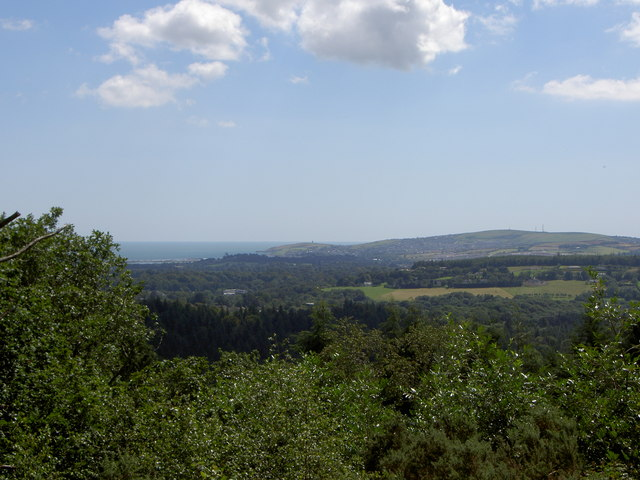

- Location within Ireland
- Location: County Wicklow, Ireland
- Coordinates: 52°58′04″N 6°00′08″W
- Area: 482 acres (195 ha)
- Designation: Special Protection Area
- Governing body: National Parks and Wildlife Service

Wicklow Head (Irish: Ceann Chill Mhantáin) is a headland near the southeast edge of the town of Wicklow in County Wicklow, approximately 3 kilometres (2 mi) from the centre of the town.

Geographically, it is the easternmost point on the mainland of the Republic of Ireland.

== Lighthouses ==
The original Wicklow Head Lighthouse was one of two lighthouses built on the headland. The original lighthouse actually consisted of two structures to differentiate between Hook Head Lighthouse to the South in Wexford and Baily Lighthouse on Howth Head to the North in Dublin. The rear tower was built as an eight-sided lantern in 1781 powered by 20 tallow candles reflected against a mirror. On 10 October 1836, the tower was struck by lightning, resulting in the destruction of its interior. It was decided however that the tower was to be left as a landmark that could be used during the hours of daylight.

A new lighthouse was built in the 19th century lower down on the headland as it became clear the upper lighthouses were no longer effective for mariners and they were often obscured by fog or mist. On 31 March 1994, the active lighthouse was converted to automatic operation and lighthouse keepers were no longer required to operate it.

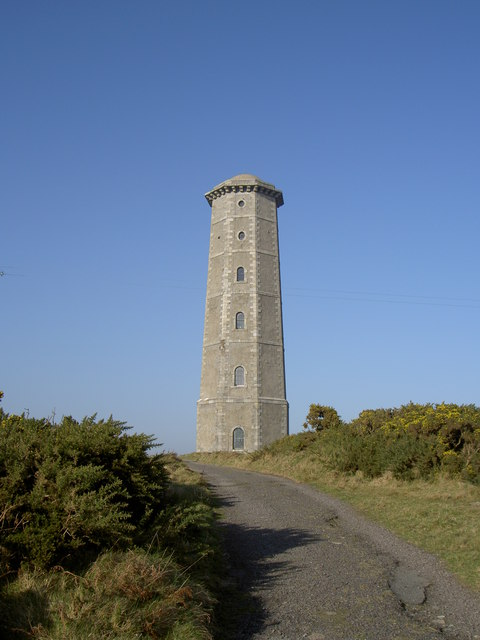
The 'Rear Lighthouse' was one of two built in the 18th century at Wicklow Head. It is now a holiday residence of the Irish Landmark Trust.

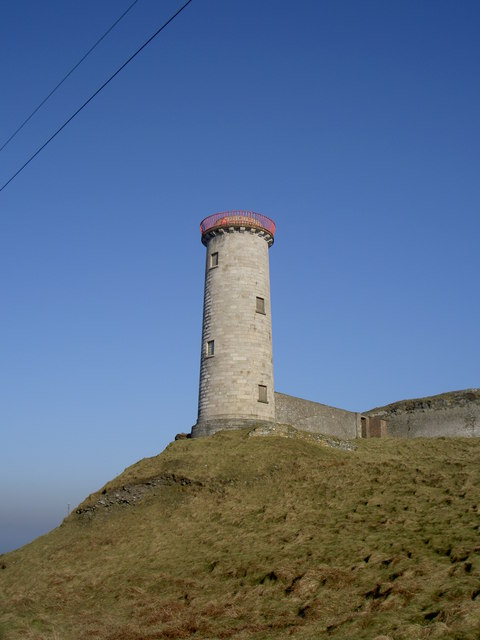
The 18th century 'Front Lighthouse' was rebuilt in the early 19th century. It is no longer active.

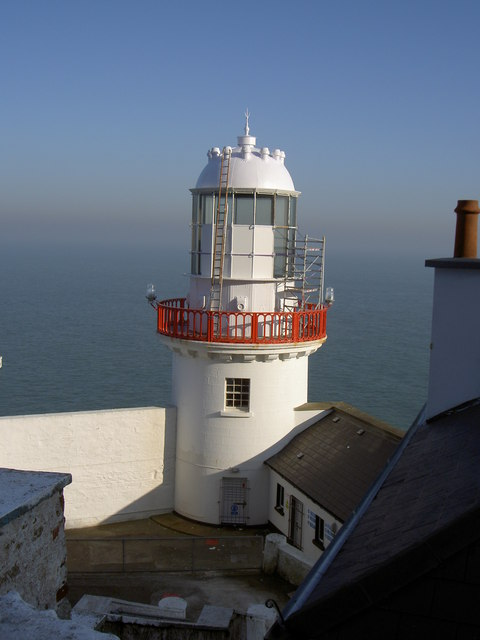
The active Wicklow Head Lighthouse was built in the 19th century, and operated by the Commissioners of Irish Lights.

== See also ==
- Lambay Island
- Extreme points of Ireland - listing points furthest in each direction around Ireland
