= Clomantagh Castle =

Tower house in County Kilkenny, Ireland

Coordinates: 52.7255°N 7.4853°W

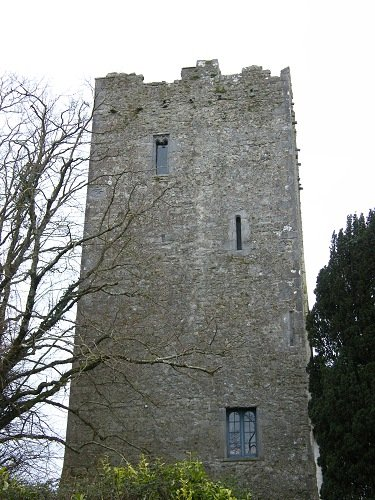
Clomantagh (or Croomantagh) Castle

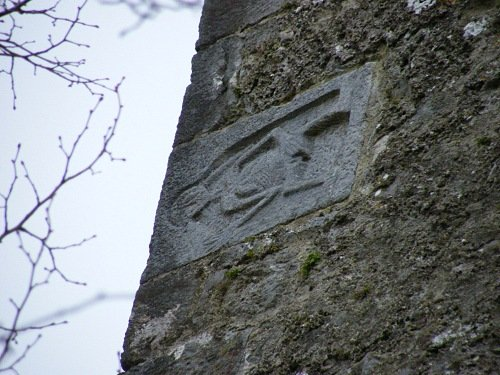
Sheela na gig relief at Clomantagh

Clomantagh Castle is a 15th-century tower house located near Freshford, County Kilkenny, in Ireland. Originally constructed in the 1430s, additional buildings and outbuildings were added in the subsequent centuries - including a connected 19th century farmhouse. Carvings on the castle's walls include a Sheela na gig relief (a symbolic pagan nude).

Situated on lands owned by the Earls of Ormond, on the death of Pierce 'Ruadh' Butler, 8th Earl of Ormond in 1539, the castle was inherited by his son, Richard Butler, 1st Viscount Mountgarret. It remained in the hands of the Butlers of Mountgarret through the 16th and 17th centuries, until its confiscation following the Cromwellian conquest of Ireland.

The castle was subject to renovations in the late 20th century (which received an award from the Royal Institute of the Architects of Ireland), and is now managed as a holiday rental property by the Irish Landmark Trust.
