= Charlotte Roueché =

British academic (born 1946)

Charlotte Roueché FSA
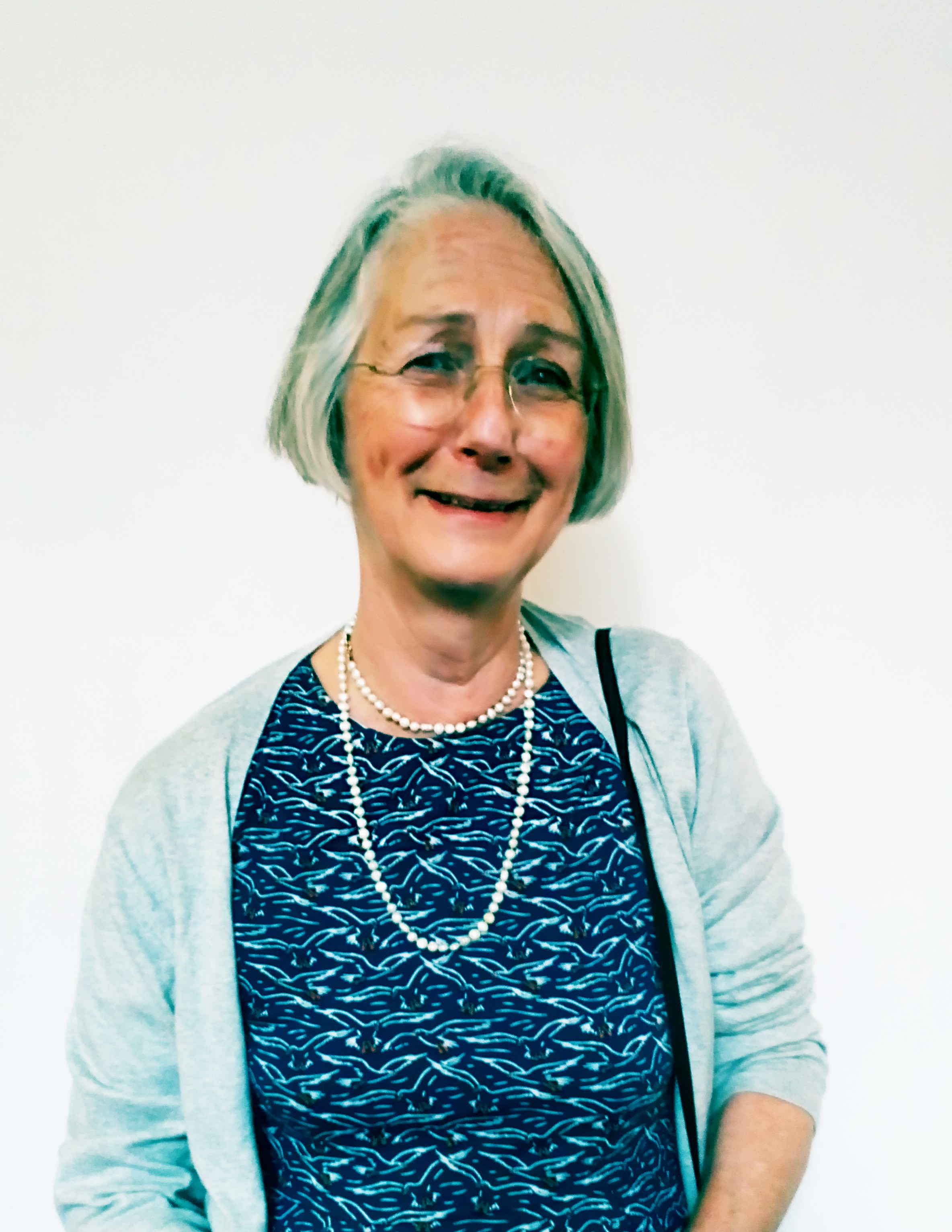
- Professor Roueché
- Born: Charlotte Wrinch; 1946 (age 79–80)
- Relatives: Ann Martha Rowan (sister); Alistair John Rowan (brother-in-law)

Academic background
- Education: Newnham College, Cambridge

Academic work
- Discipline: Classical studies Archaeology
- Sub-discipline: Ancient Rome; Late Antiquity; Byzantine Empire; digital humanities
- Institutions: King's College London

Charlotte Roueché (née Wrinch) FSA (born 1946) is a British academic who specialises in the analysis of texts, inscribed or in manuscripts, from the Roman, Late Antique, and Byzantine periods. She is particularly interested in those from the Asia Minor cities of ancient Ephesos and Aphrodisias. She is also interested in the interface between digital humanities and classical and Byzantine studies. She is Professor Emerita of Digital Hellenic Studies at King's College London, and Honorary Fellow of the Institute of Classical Studies, University of London.

Roueché has a degree in classics from Newnham College, Cambridge.

On 21 June 2018, Roueché was awarded a Docteur honoris causa by the l’École Pratique des Hautes Études, Sorbonne University, Paris. The title is 'one of the most prestigious distinctions awarded by French universities to honour personalities of foreign nationality because of outstanding services to science, literature or the arts'. Her honorary lecture was 'Le défi Robert: transformation d’une discipline'.

In 2019 she gave The Susan Hockey Lecture in Digital Humanities at University College London, 'Wider Horizons, Harder Borders or Whose data are they, anyway?' Also in 2019, she delivered the 10th Barron Memorial Lecture at the Institute of Classical Studies, London; the lecture was titled 'Forming/informing the modern world? The role of classical scholarship'.

== Personal life ==
Roueché's is the younger sister of the archivist and editor Ann Martha Rowan, and the sister-in-law of the architectural historian Alistair John Rowan.

== Selected publications ==
- Heritage Gazetteer of Libya, co-editor
- Heritage Gazetteer of Cyprus, co-editor
- Inscriptions of Roman Cyrenaica (2020), by Joyce M. Reynolds, Charlotte Roueché and Gabriel Bodard. Society for Libyan Studies. ISBN 978-1-912466-22-1
- Roueche, C., 2020, “Celebrity and Power: Circus Factions forty years on.” In Harris, W. & Hunnel Chen, A. (eds.), Late Antique Studies in Memory of Alan Cameron. Leiden: Brill, pp. 247–259
- Abdelhamed, M. H. H. & Roueché, C., 2019, “Digitising Libyan heritage: Inscriptions and toponomy.” Libyan Studies 50, pp. 87–92.
- Inscriptions of Roman Tripolitania, by J. M. Reynolds and J. B. Ward-Perkins, enhanced electronic reissue by Gabriel Bodard and Charlotte Roueché (2009). ISBN 978-1-897747-23-0. Third edition in 2021: Inscriptions of Roman Tripolitania, by Charlotte Roueché, Gabriel Bodard, Caroline Barron, Irene Vagionakis et al. Society for Libyan Studies. ISBN 978-1-912466-25-2
- Sharing Ancient Wisdoms, co-edited by Charlotte M Roueché, Elvira Wakelnig, and Anna Jordanous (2013)
- Inscriptions of Aphrodisias (2007), by Joyce Reynolds, Charlotte Roueché, Gabriel Bodard, ISBN 978-1-897747-19-3.
- Aphrodisias in Late Antiquity: The Late Roman and Byzantine Inscriptions, revised second edition, 2004, ISBN 1-897747-17-9.
- Aphrodisias papers 3: the setting and quarries, mythological and other sculptural decoration, architectural development, Portico of Tiberius (1996): co-editor with R.R.R.Smith
- Performers and partisans at Aphrodisias in the Roman and late Roman periods (1993) with a section by Nathalie de Chaisemartin
- The Making of Byzantine history: studies dedicated to Donald M. Nicol (1993): co-editor, with Roderick Beaton
- Aphrodisias papers: recent Work on Architecture and Sculpture: Including the Papers Given at the Second *International Aphrodisias Colloquium Held at King's College (1990): co-editor with K.T.Erim.
- Aphrodisias in late antiquity: the late Roman and Byzantine inscriptions (1989)
- 'Acclamations in the Later Roman Empire: New Evidence from Aphrodisias', Journal of Roman Studies, Volume 74 November 1984, pp. 181–99
