= Irish Landmark Trust =

Architectural conservation organisation

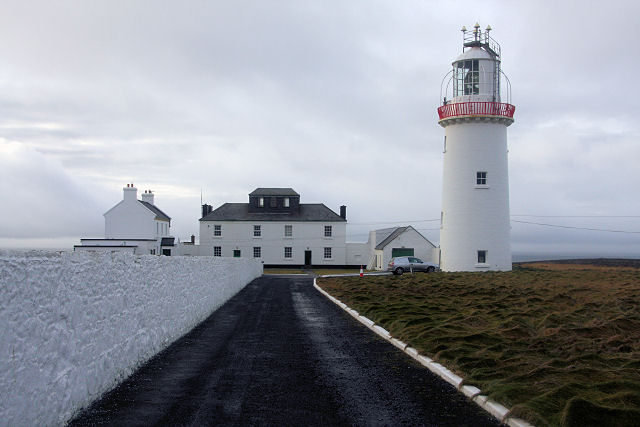
- Loop Head's lighthouse cottages are Irish Landmark Trust properties.
- Formation: 1992
- Legal status: Building conservation and preservation charity
- Headquarters: 11 Parnell Square, Dublin
- Region served: Ireland
- Website: Irishlandmark.com

The Irish Landmark Trust is an architectural conservation and educational organisation founded in Ireland in 1992. Similar to the British Landmark Trust (founded in 1965), it is a registered charity which renovates buildings of historic interest and makes them available for holiday rental, while collating and sharing information on construction and restoration techniques. As of 2018, the organisation had restored over 30 properties on the island of Ireland, including a number of lighthouses and castles.

The organisation has its registered office at 11 Parnell Square, the headquarters of the Irish Heritage Trust.

== History ==
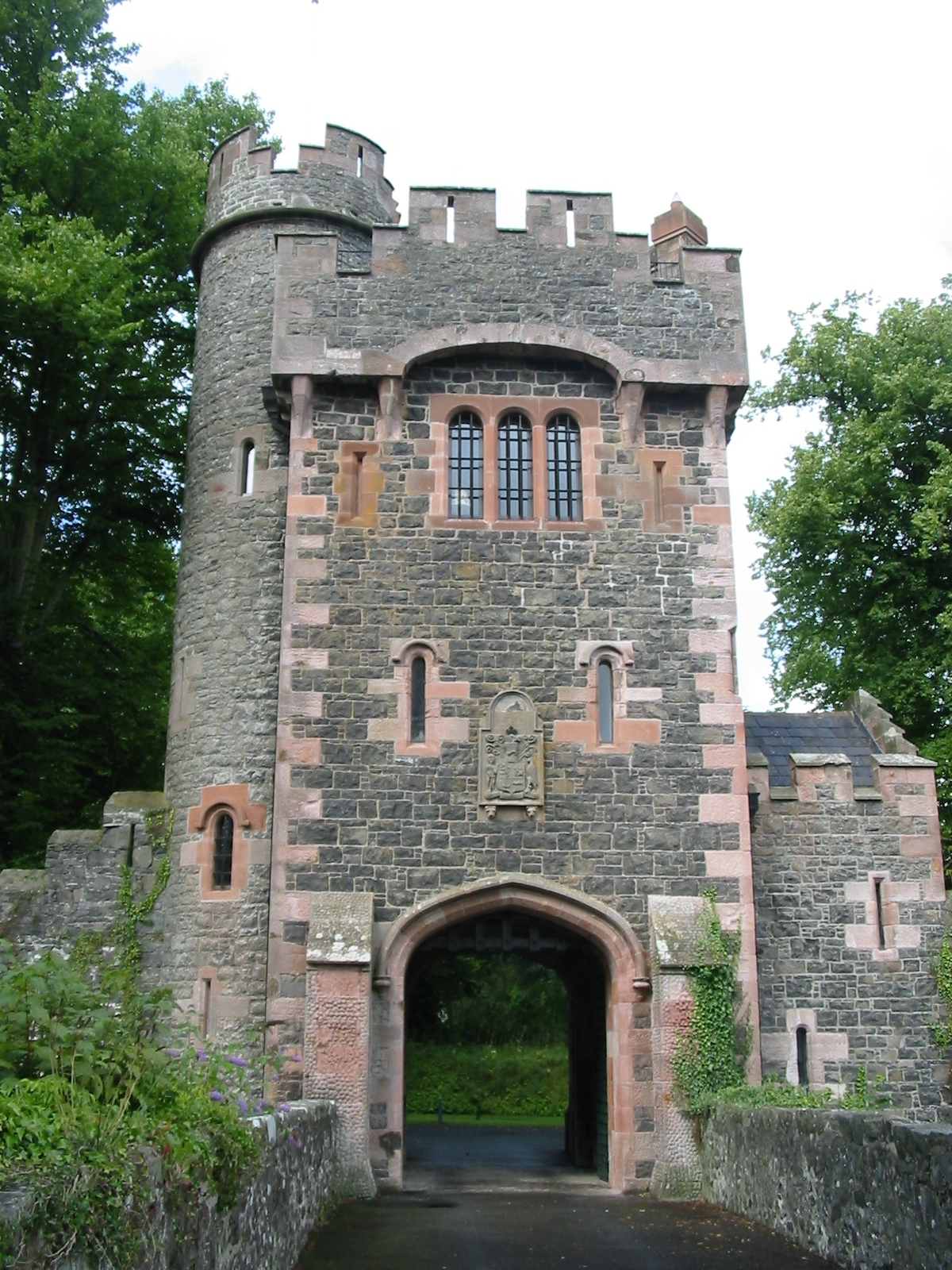
The 'Barbican Gate' at Glenarm Castle is managed as a holiday let by the organisation.

Following meetings hosted by the chairperson of the then Crafts Council of Ireland, Terry Kelly, the Irish Landmark Trust was established in the Republic of Ireland in 1992. It was established in Northern Ireland in 1996. Early funding of the charity included input from Chuck Feeney's Atlantic Philanthropies foundation.

After three years in operation, the charity opened its first property, Wicklow Head Lighthouse, which it had acquired as a hollow shell.

In June 2017, the organisation celebrated its 25th anniversary at Castletown House.

== Goal and approach ==
The organisation's main stated aim is to "conserve and sustain iconic buildings", primarily "architecturally significant small buildings". It characterises itself as an educational trust, making the historic buildings accessible to the public, and documenting and sharing original construction techniques and modern restoration approaches. It uses a panel of conservation architects and local tradespeople in restoration projects.

Maintenance and restoration works are funded by income generated from holiday rentals, as well as from State and other funding sources. In return for supporting the cost of renovation works, property owners provide the Irish Landmark Trust with a long-term lease on the property – which later reverts to the owner; the lease may be for an owner's lifetime, or, typically, fifty years.

== Organisation ==
The organisation is overseen by non-executive trustees, as of 2020, 14 including the organisation's chairperson. As a not-for-profit operation, it maintains charitable status for its companies in both jurisdictions on the island of Ireland. Historian Nicholas Robinson (previously associated with the Irish Architectural Archive) was the first chairperson of the organisation, and was the president of the trust as of 2017. The chairperson, as of early 2023, was Michael O'Boyle.

It has a staff of approximately 5 administrative and 25 property management personnel, reporting to a CEO. As of 2023, this was Niamh Lunny.

== Funding ==
Aside from the early Atlantic Philanthropies funds, the trust established an early relationship with the Heritage Council, and had for many years both a basic "stipend" from the council, and access to "Building at Risk" funds. It also received some local council conservation grants. Remaining funding came from a combination of the rental income of the portfolio of properties and private fundraising (a number of major Irish businesses are credited as donors).

The charity also operates a "membership" scheme for what it terms "Landmarkers." The scheme, which does not involve membership of the charitable companies, primarily comprises three levels of regular donation and direct benefits include advance notice of special offers, and member-only viewing and educational events. Furniture and other items of use in restoration are also donated.

In 2014, the charity reported that the "core" funding from the Heritage Council was reduced by 30%, and the other grants had largely ceased, leading to a temporary stop to work on new buildings, funding from which had been 70% grant-based, to focus remaining funds on maintenance of existing rental stock. Overall grant income in the Republic of Ireland in 2017 was under 300,000 euro, alongside over 500,000 euro in donations, while grant income in Northern Ireland was negligible, but over 200,000 pounds came in from fundraising.

== Properties ==
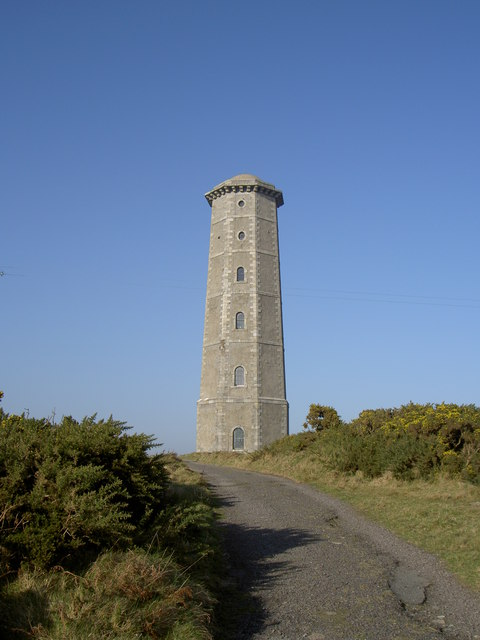
Wicklow Head's rear lighthouse was the charity's first property

As of 2018, the trust's 32 properties, of which 31 are available to rent, include a number of towers, gate lodges, thatched cottages, castles, lighthouses and at least one schoolhouse. The Trust's Temple Bar Georgian townhouse was withdrawn from letting in 2017, pending remedial works. Towers and castles managed by the organisation include Helen's Tower in County Down, and Clomantagh Castle in County Kilkenny, the oldest property held as of 2018. Lighthouses and lighthouse cottages renovated by the organisation include several at Galley Head Lighthouse in County Cork, Blackhead Lighthouse in County Antrim, and Wicklow Head Lighthouse.

The taking on of new properties has been limited in the late 2010s, with the trust commenting in 2018 that it was having to turn down increasing numbers of offered properties due to funding limitations. As of April 2018 just one new project, at Elizabeth Fort in County Cork, was being actively renovated, and it was completed later that year. At the same time, two projects, one in the Phoenix Park and one involving the Saunderscourt Gate Lodges in County Wexford, were in planning.

== See also ==
- List of lighthouses in Ireland
