= Galley Head Lighthouse =

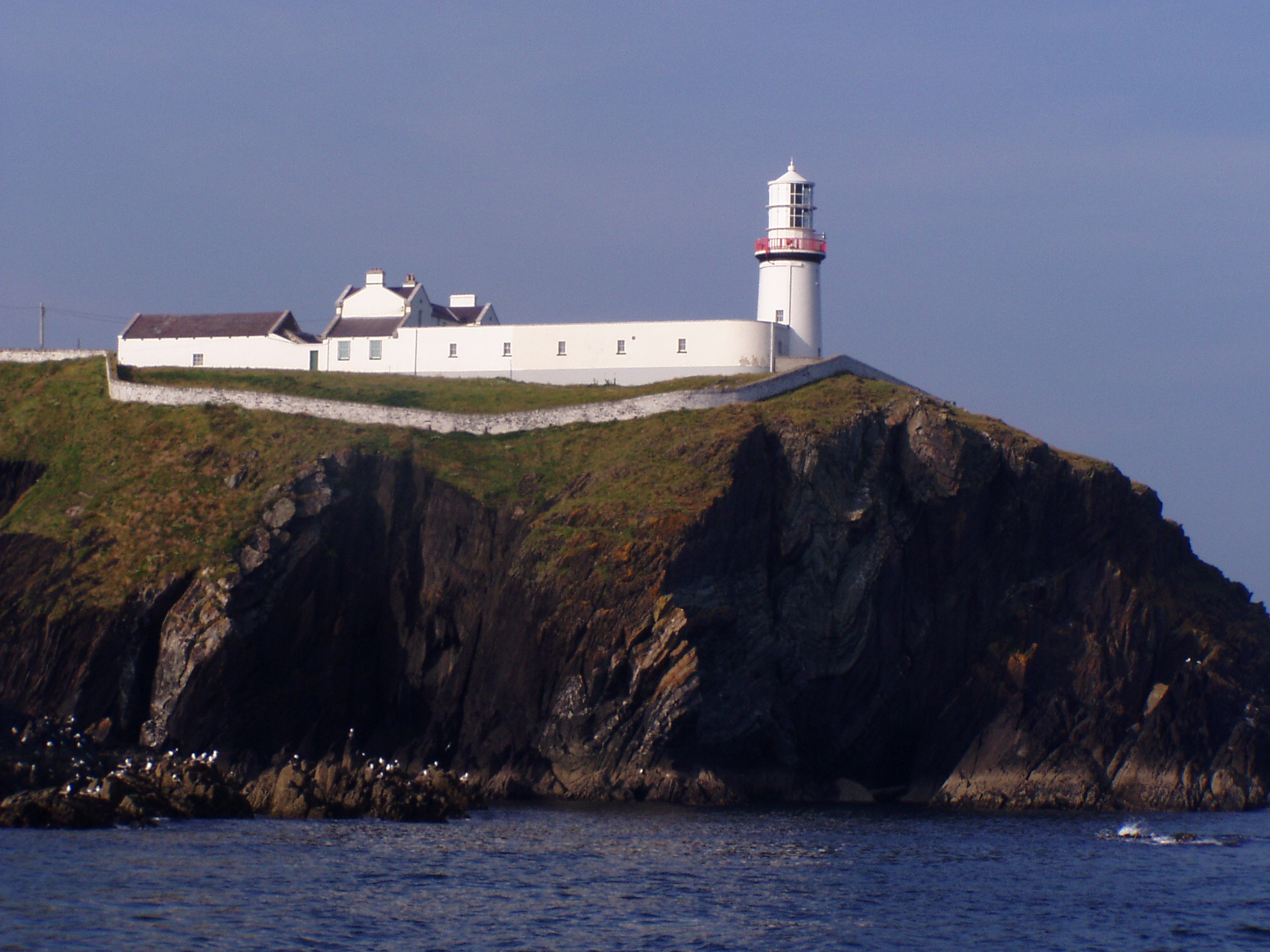
- Galley Head Lighthouse
- Location: County Cork, Ireland
- Coordinates: 51°31′46.9″N 8°57′08.8″W

Tower
- Constructed: 1868
- Construction: masonry tower
- Automated: 1978
- Height: 21 metres (69 ft)
- Shape: cylindrical tower with balcony and lantern
- Markings: white tower, red lantern rail
- Operator: Commissioners of Irish Lights

Light
- First lit: 1878
- Focal height: 53 metres (174 ft)
- Range: 23 nautical miles (43 km; 26 mi)
- Characteristic: Fl (5) W 20s
- Ireland no.: CIL-0160

The Galley Head Lighthouse is an active 19th century lighthouse outside of Rosscarbery, County Cork, on the south coast of Ireland.

The lighthouse is situated on Galley Head at the southern end of the headland known as Dundeady Island at 133 feet above sea level, overlooking the Celtic Sea and two beaches, Red Strand to the east and the Long Strand to the west. The headland is cut off from the mainland by the ancient walls of the old Norman stronghold of Dun Deidi, an important fortress of the local Ó Cobhthaigh Clan.

== History ==
Although the main buildings were completed in 1875, the site did not become operational until 1878. The original light characteristic consisted of six or seven flashes of white light within sixteen seconds every minute. This was due to the operation of a revolving octagonal optic, combined with a light powered by coal gas burners that were switched on and off every two seconds or so. With a range of 16 nautical miles (30 km; 18 mi) in clear conditions, it was one of the most powerful lights of its time.

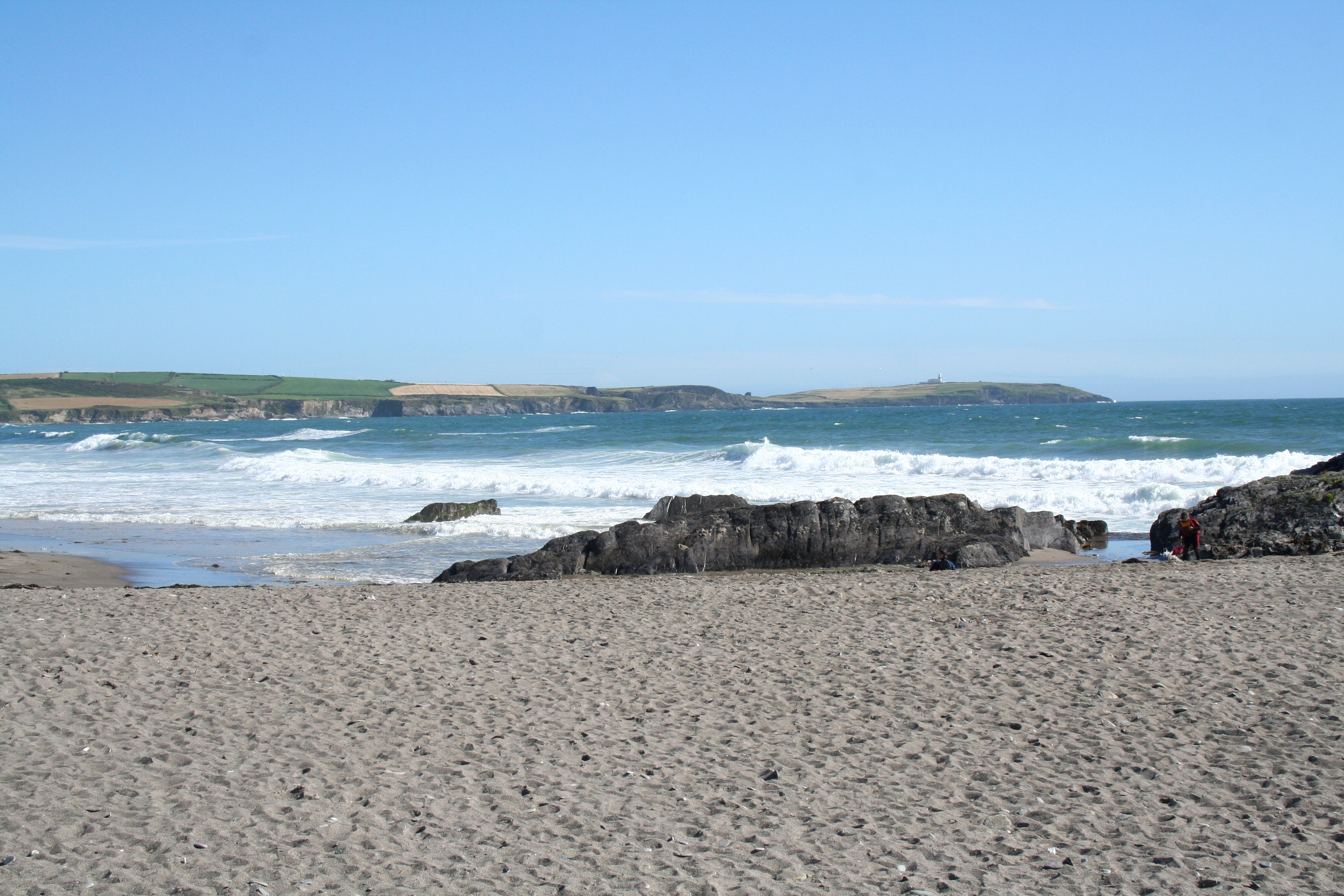
Galley Head from Rosscarbery Bay

The two keepers' houses have been returned to their original symmetrical layout and are offered for holiday rental by the Irish Landmark Trust. Sleeping 4–6 people in each, they are linked by an internal door, so that larger parties (8–12) might be accommodated. Each house has a double and twin bedroom, and a fold-down sofa bed, plus a bathroom, kitchen and sitting room. Both houses have adjoining walled lawns.

The station was built in 1875, during the heyday of lighthouse building, and within twenty years of its closest neighbours at Old Head of Kinsale and Fastnet. The Galley Head and the Fastnet have the distinction of being two of the most powerful lighthouses in Europe. The lighthouse displays an unusual landward arc of light because, it is said, the Sultan of Turkey asked to be able to see it from Castle Freke at Rosscarbery nearby on his visit there. The castle, abandoned in 1952, can be seen from Galley as a Gothic ruin.

== Film and media ==
Galley Head Lighthouse was featured in the music video for "To The Lighthouse" by British singer-songwriter Patrick Wolf.

== See also ==
- List of lighthouses in Ireland
