= Kilkenny Design Workshops =

The Kilkenny Design Workshops (KDW) were a government-funded research and development centre of excellence for design (and design advocacy, research and promotion) which was established in Ireland in 1963. It was created to inspire, support and demonstrate to industry how design could be the key factor in change and lead to economic success. This was a new departure, up to this point no model had existed anywhere in the world for this type of practice. Teamwork is common today in design practices but this method was new for its time. KDW operated from the converted Ormonde Stables in Kilkenny City from its official opening in 1965 until its closure in 1988. The Workshops, designed by architect Niall Montgomery, won the inaugural RIAI Silver Medal for Conservation in 1976.

== History ==
William H. Walsh was the founder of KDW and Chief Executive of Córas Tráchtála Teoranta (CTT) or Irish Export Board. He had a vision for improving standards of design in industry to encourage commerce, trade and export. Walsh also realised the importance of design for the Irish market and how the existing situation in Ireland in the early 1960s (including protective tariffs) meant that a strategy would be required to encourage appreciation and promotion of good design.

Steps had been taken to ensure that the design situation in Ireland was carefully assessed. A group of selected Scandinavian designers were commissioned to compile the Design in Ireland report (also known as The Scandinavian Report), auditing the standards of design in Ireland. William H. Walsh spearheaded the establishment of Kilkenny Design Workshops, itself a revolutionary move as this was to be the first state agency established outside Dublin.

The early workshops in Kilkenny were Ceramics, Candle making, Precious Metals and Metalwork Woodturning and Textiles; which comprised weaving and printed textile departments. Graphic Design was added in 1969 and 3D work included Furniture Design. Designers also contributed to packaging production and exhibition design. Industrial Design and Design Consultancy services were offered to clients as the shift moved from traditional industry to engineering based production industries.

Workshops were staffed with teams of creatives; artists designers, craftspeople, apprentices, graduates and students, including technicians and chemists to assist with research and development. The management team also consisted of a creative and active board that included artists Louis le Brocquy, Pat Scott and Sir Basil Goulding.

Retail was seen as an opportunity from the early days of KDW and the KDW shop was used to sell prototypes, promote design and provide manufacturers with a working example of the business opportunities around well designed and promoted Irish products. Links were forged with buyers from American and UK retailers. KDW opened a shop in Ghiradelli Square in San Francisco and participated in in-store promotions in Altman's in New York, Heal's in London and Neiman Marcus in Dallas.

Design advocacy included seminars and exhibitions, the education of the designers in the workshops led to the potential for good design to spread out of the Kilkenny Graduate Programmes which refined the skills of young designers. Many of those who partook in programmes run by KDW went on to establish their own creative enterprises or teach in design departments at second and third level in Ireland. KDW also had participation in and representation on international design organisations including the World Crafts Council, the International Centre for Settlement of Investment Disputes (ICSID) and the International Council of Design (Ico-D), formerly known as International Council of Graphic Design Associations (ICOGRADA). Later KDW itself became an inspiration and a model for design development in other countries, its legacy spread to several countries around the world interested in building up design for industry and using KDW’s example as a template for establishing this approach in their own country.

Although Kilkenny Design Workshops ceased operation in 1988 their output had transformed the visual culture of Ireland. KDW demonstrated the importance of design for efficient manufacturing processes and well designed marketing material to communicate the quality of products, it also endorsed the creation of beautiful products that could be both functional and visually appealing.

== Legacy ==
In 2013, to celebrate the 50th anniversary of the founding of the KDW, the Design & Crafts Council of Ireland (DCCoI) held a conference titled "KDW@21C" that sought to investigate the continuing legacy and acknowledge the influence of the KDW on Irish design practice and culture. Part of the conference was a "Remembering KDW" event, a reunion for former KDW participants.

In 2015, the DCCoI released an iOS app titled "Kilkenny Design Workshops" highlighting the work of the KDW.

=== Irish Design 2015 (ID2015) ===
2015 marked 50 years since KDW officially opened. To commemorate this event, the Global Irish Economic Forum in 2013 conceived of ID2015, a year-long programme celebrating the history of Irish design. ID2015 was a major government backed initiative that explored, promoted and celebrated Irish design through events and activities on the island of Ireland and in renowned international capitals of design and commerce.

The initiative sought to:

- raise the profile of Irish design, at home and abroad
- increase awareness of the value of design in all aspects of life
- build on the international reputation of Irish design
- encourage links between local and global Irish designers
- showcase the importance of design to success in business and as a driver of economic growth

The all-island initiative was convened by the Design and Crafts Council of Ireland (DCCoI), in collaboration with partner organisations, on behalf of the Department of Enterprise, Trade and Employment, the Department of Foreign Affairs and Trade and Enterprise Ireland. President of Ireland Michael D. Higgins was the Patron of Irish Design 2015.

As part of ID2015, Dublin was designated World Design Hub 2015 by the International Association of Designers, providing Ireland with a platform to promote the skills and talents of Irish designers to a worldwide audience.

The achievements and impact of ID2015 are discussed in Irish Design 2015 - Making Design Matter a book that offers a comprehensive examination of the year of Irish design. Through a series of essays by key participants in the initiative, spotlight reports on the different projects mounted throughout the year, and group discussions featuring leading Irish and international figures from the sector, Making Design Matter captures the why and the how of the landmark initiative that was Irish Design 2015 (ID2015). Edited by Professor Alex Milton, ID2015 Programme Director; Karen Hennessy, CEO of ID2015 and DCCoI and Rachel Donnelly, ID2015 Content Editor, the publication takes a broad view of the design sector in Ireland, reflecting on key moments in its past, engaging with its vibrant present, and speculating about its optimistic future. The publication also presents a comprehensive quantitative analysis of the impact of the year's activities, alongside statistics representing the economic footprint of the design sector in Ireland. ID2015 was pioneering in its target-focused approach to making design matter, with the result that this is the first ever quantitative analysis of the impact of design activity mounted on this scale.

Key outcomes of the initiative were:

- 370 newly registered design companies
- 476 designers supported to attend international design-based trade events
- 50 companies supported to undertake design training
- €24.1 million in design-based exports generated
- 28.5 million people engaged with ID2015 through exhibitions and events
- €20.1 million+ PR value generated
- 3 design accelerators launched
