= Armagh Robinson Library =

Library in Armagh, Northern Ireland

Coordinates: 54°20′55″N 6°39′26″W

The Armagh Robinson Library, formerly the Armagh Public Library, is a public library in the city of Armagh in Northern Ireland.

The library was founded by the Archbishop of Armagh, Richard Robinson, in 1771 when he chose to share his own collection with the local public. Robinson's collections remain on display in the nearby St Patrick's (Church of Ireland) Cathedral. The collections on display include around 45,000 works on science, theology, medicine, history, travel, law and history. The collections also contain coins, medals and maps. The Long Room in the Armagh Robinson Library hosts temporary exhibitions in addition the archbishop's archaeological collection. A copy of Jonathan Swift's Gulliver’s Travels with additional handwritten notes is on display.

The displays at Armagh Robinson Library also overspill to the nearby No 5 Vicar's Hill. Armagh Robinson Library holds a group of prints known as The Rokeby Collection.
