= Dictionary of Irish Architects =

Online database of architects, builders, and craftsmen

- Location: 45 Merrion Square East, Dublin 2, D02 VY60, Dublin, Ireland
- Type: Bibliographic database
- Established: January 2009; 17 years ago
- Affiliation: Irish Architectural Archive
- Period covered: 1720 -1940
- Employees: Ann Martha Rowan
- Website: dia.ie

The Dictionary of Irish Architects is an online database which contains biographical and bibliographical information on architects, builders and craftsmen born or working in Ireland during the period 1720 to 1940, and information on the buildings on which they worked. Although it is principally devoted to architects, it includes engineers who designed buildings and structures, some builders, some artists and craftsmen, and some amateurs and writers on architectural subjects.

The dictionary was initially devised and created by Ann Martha Rowan.

Architects from Britain and elsewhere who never resided in Ireland but designed buildings there are not given full biographical treatment, and only their Irish works are listed. Irish-born architects who emigrated are similarly treated; their careers after their departure from Ireland are not described in detail, and only their Irish works are listed in full.

The Dictionary of Irish Architects was created and compiled in the Irish Architectural Archive (IAA) over a period of thirty years. It was made publicly available online in January 2009. According to the IAA it remains a "work in progress" with new data added and updated since its initial release. As of 2018, it reportedly contained 6,700 entries.
