= Irish Architectural Archive =

National archive in Dublin, Ireland

Coordinates: 53.33867°N 6.246852°W

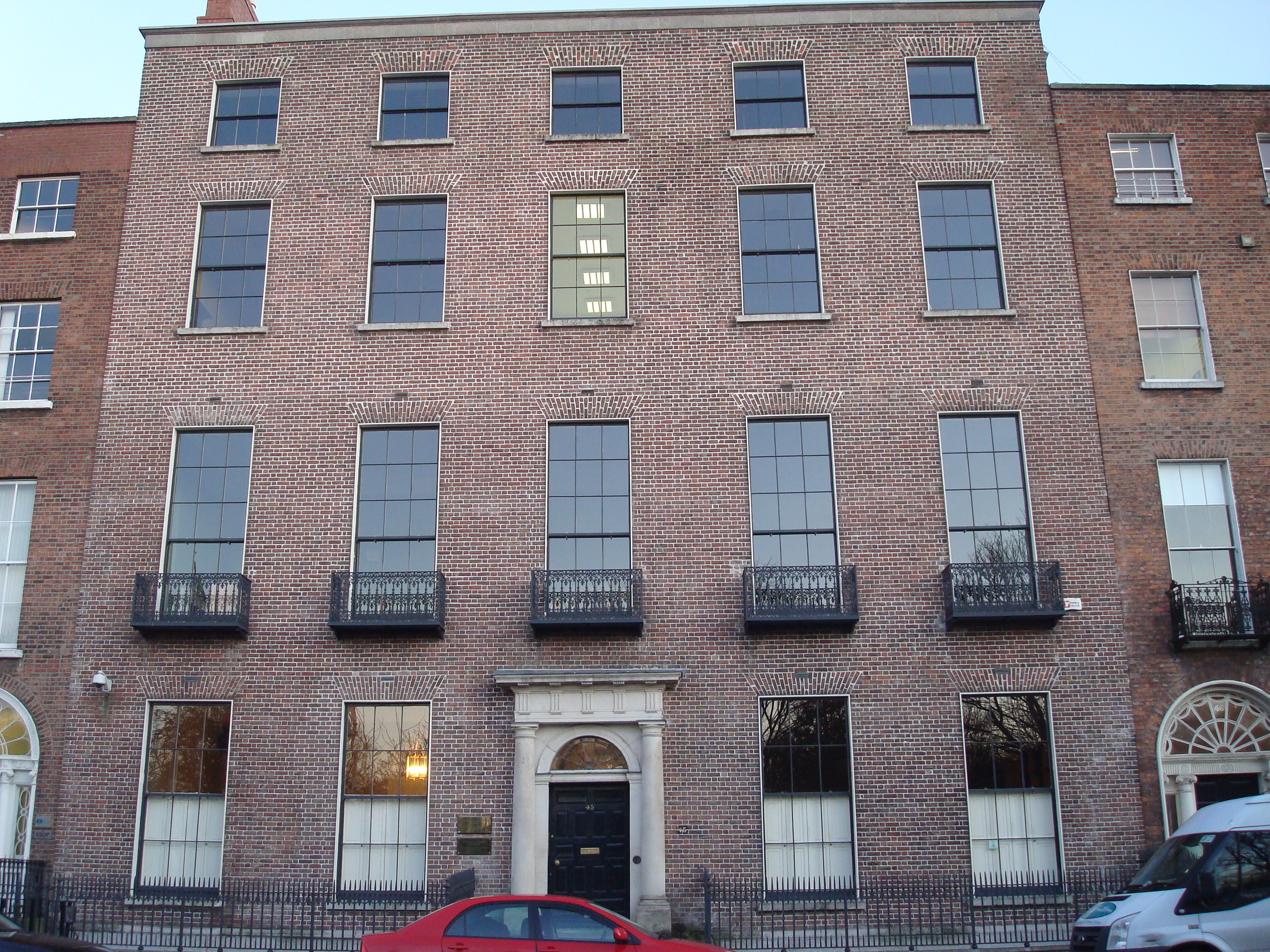
- The organisation's headquarters at 45 Merrion Square.
- Formation: 1976
- Founders: An Taisce (The National Trust for Ireland); Dr Edward McParland; Nicholas Robinson
- Type: Non-governmental organisation
- Purpose: Archiving of architectural materials, museum and gallery
- Headquarters: 45 Merrion Square, Dublin 2
- Location: Dublin, Ireland
- Region served: Ireland
- CEO: Colum O’Riordan
- Website: www.iarc.ie
- Formerly called: National Trust Archive

The Irish Architectural Archive was established in 1976 by Dr Edward McParland and Nicholas Robinson as the National Trust Archive with its objective being to collect and preserve material of every kind relating to the architecture of Ireland, and make it available to the public. It is based at 45 Merrion Square, Dublin, and is an independent private company with charitable status. The repository serves as the main collection of diverse materials pertaining to Irish architecture.

== History ==
The archive was founded by Edward McParland and Nicholas Robinson as the National Trust Archive in 1976, with Nick Sheaf appointed the first director and Niall Montgomery also among its founding members.

Its first premises was located at 63 Merrion Square. The archive was initially founded under the auspices of An Taisce and with a cornerstone donation of its architectural collections and libraries.

Alistair Rowan was appointed director in 1981, and the organisation was renamed the Irish Architectural Archive and moved to number 73 Merrion Square.

The organisation was formally designated National Archive status in 1996, by Ruairi Quinn, who was then Minister of Finance and later served as the archive's chairperson from 2020-2023.

A dedicated new headquarters at 45 Merrion Square, a Georgian house and the former home of Gustavus Hume constructed in 1794, was restored between 2002 and 2004 for use as an archive by the Office of Public Works.

The archive oversees the Dictionary of Irish Architects which was developed over a period of 30 years by Ann Martha Rowan and launched formally in 2009 as an online archive.

The IAA is governed by a Board of Directors, which is supported by a lay Community Advisory Group (CAG) and a limited membership.

=== Mission ===
The archive seeks to accumulate authentic or, if unavailable, replicated documentation of Irish architecture, with the intention of providing unrestricted access to the public. The expanding assortment encompasses many forms of material, such as publications, books, sketches, etchings, paperwork, models, images, and prints. The focus lies on the time span ranging from 1560 to the contemporary. The diverse records encompass a wide range of structures found throughout Ireland, including both stately and traditional structures. They provide comprehensive information about the surroundings and characteristics of these buildings. In addition to the reading and research amenities, the archive offers a duplication service. The archive is an impartial entity that refrains from participating in any form of development or preservation disputes. In addition, the archive actively implements a policy of publishing and engaging with the public through programmes for outreach.

=== Collections ===
Among the founding items in the collection were drawings from the practice established in Ireland by Augustus Pugin in the late 1830s.

The archive comprises over 3,500 individual acquisitions, ranging from single items - a book, pamphlet, drawing or photograph - to the thousands of drawings and files created by large architectural practices. The IAA's collections represent the largest body of historic architectural records in Ireland. They include more than 250,000 architectural drawings, ranging in date from the late seventeenth to the twentieth centuries. Also housed in the archive are over 400,000 photographs, making it one of the largest collections of photographs in Ireland. The archive also holds a reference library, with over 15,000 prints.

The IAA holds a collection of photographs and drawings, the Peter and Mary Doyle Collection, which was bequeathed by Irish modernist architects Peter and Mary Doyle.

In 2001, Maurice Craig, an architectural historian, made a donation of two thousand pictures to the Irish Architectural Archive.

The Irish Architectural Archive released a publication in 2019 that delved into the architectural aspects of Irish courthouses, spanning from the early 17th century to the present day. The book, titled 'Ireland's Court Houses,' was edited by Paul Burns, Ciaran O'Connor, and Colum O'Riordan. The book also includes a gazetteer that, for the first time in one volume, offered a thorough catalogue of courthouses throughout the entirety of Ireland.

In June 2022, a display, organised by the National Archives in conjunction with the Irish Architectural Archive, opened to commemorate the one hundredth anniversary of the decimation of the Public Record Office during the Irish Civil War. The installation featured a collection of images, architectural schematics and designs, maps and elevations, film clips, and salvaged records.

In September 2022, Robert O'Byrne, an architecture blogger, donated a comprehensive digital collection of photographs he had captured from 2012 to 2022 to the IAA. In addition, he organised a showcase in the offices of the IAA.

The IAA also possesses the initial design of Leinster House, created by Richard Castle.

== Exhibitions ==
Exhibitions, held at the IAA, have included:

- 2023, The Coiffured, by artist and sociologist, Amanda Jane Graham.
- 3–13 March 2020, Exhibition for a Good Man, a solo exhibition by Irish artist Paula Pohli.
- 2019, A Visual Window to an Ecclesiastical World, of historical drawings of Church of Ireland buildings, curated by Dr Michael O’Neill FSA.
- 2018, Memorialising the Sacred, an installation exploring sacred buildings in Crete, curated by Anthony Kelly, Seán McCrum, Paddy Sammon and David Stalling.
- 2017, House and Home, an exhibition of drawings, publications, models and photographs of mid-18th century to late 20th-century Irish homes. The exhibition marked the 40th anniversary of the archive.
- 2016, ICC Speak, a collaboration with the Irish Composers’ Collective, featuring immersive installations and performances by: Anna Clifford and Veronica Szabo (Very Clock theatre company); Michelle O’Rourke; the Kirkos Ensemble (who performed work by Adam Bradley, Kevin Free and Robbie Blake); Tonnta Music (who performed compositions by Róisín Hayes and Shell Dooley).

== See also ==
- Architecture of Ireland
