= National Museum of Costume =

Museum and costume collection in Scotland

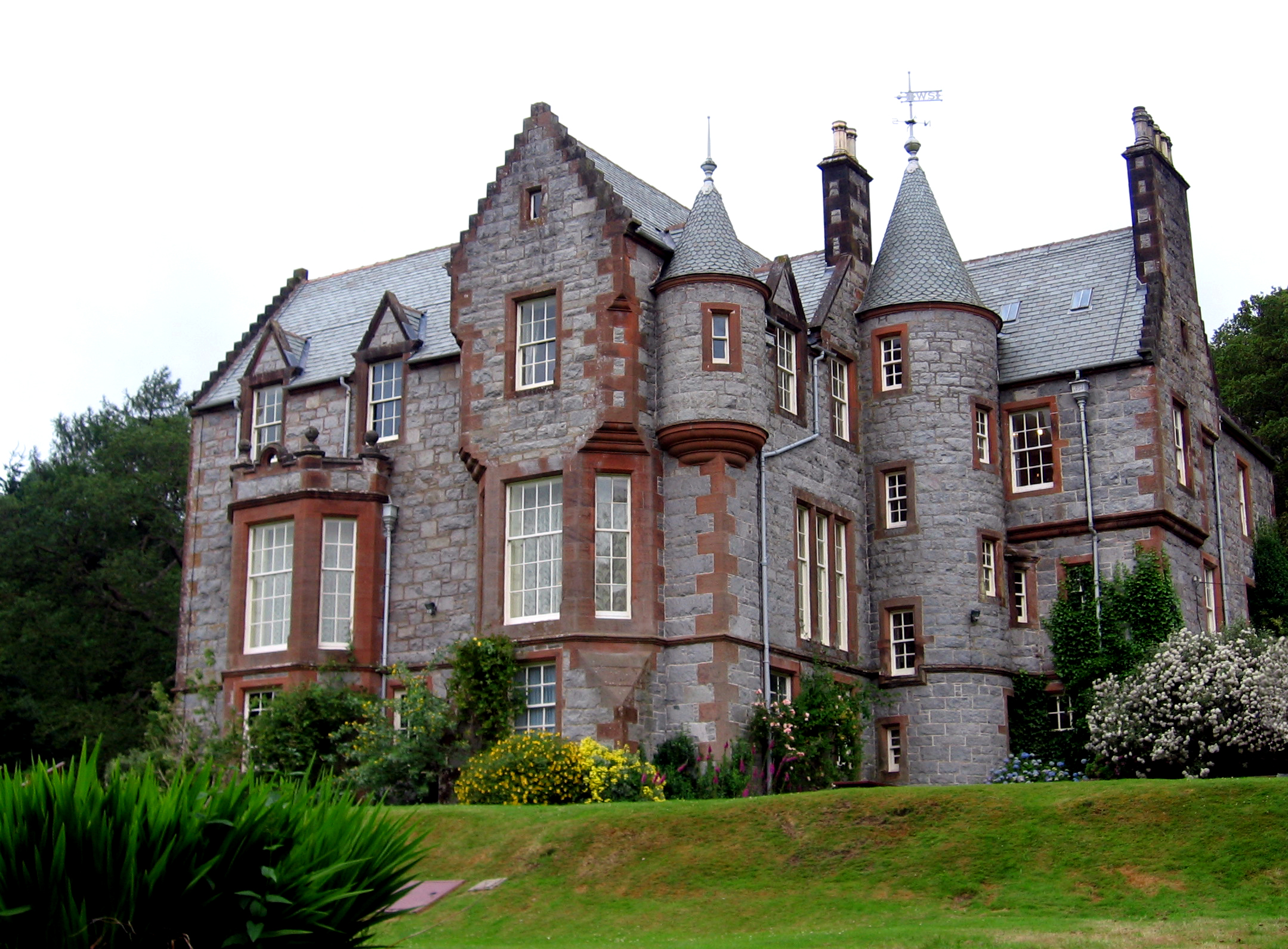
- Shambellie House Museum of Costume
- Established: 1982
- Dissolved: 2013
- Location: New Abbey, Dumfries and Galloway, Scotland
- Coordinates: 54.98324°N 3.62583°W

The National Museum of Costume was located at Shambellie House, in New Abbey, Dumfries and Galloway, Scotland and it formed part of the National Museums of Scotland. The museum started operating in 1982. The museum allowed a look at fashion and the lifestyle of the wealthy from the 1850s to the 1950s. The clothes were presented in lifelike room settings. In January 2013, National Museums Scotland announced that the National Museum of Costume was to close and the site would not reopen for 2013.

== Construction ==
Shambellie House is a Victorian country house and was designed by the Scottish architect David Bryce in 1856 for the Stewart family. Charles William Stewart's father had inherited Shambellie House before World War II. In 1976, Charles W. Stewart gave the costume collection he had built up over several years to the Royal Scottish Museum and handed over Shambellie House to the Department of the Environment.

== Rooms ==
Each of the rooms presents clothes in different periods and for different events. The portrait paintings one can see around the house show the Stewart family.

=== Dining room ===
The dining room presents a scene in summer 1895.

"See the family members gathering for a summer evening party. The gentleman and lady of the house in evening wear ready to welcome further guests. A cold collation is already laid out, whilst the butler is arranging glasses on the side table.

Highlights include a beautiful selection of evening dresses and also a mourning dress, of black satin, trimmed with jet. The mourning process in Edwardian and Victorian society followed a strict code.

Furniture and paintings include a rosewood sideboard by Alexander Burgess, about 1890, a marble clock and matching vases, part of the original 19th century furnishings of the room, and an oak inlaid plinth, one of a pair designed by William Burges for Ruthin Castle, Wales, and is dated 1853. Also in the Dining Room is a portrait of Bethia Donaldson, the second wife of William Stewart (1750-1844) and mother of the William Stewart who built Shambellie."

=== Drawing room ===
A scene in May 1945 is presented in the drawing room.

"Members of the household and a visitor are gathering excitedly to listen to the latest news about the Second World War on the wireless. The room is furnished with 19th century sofa and chairs, a tea service is English porcelain about 1900, a display of nineteenth century ceramics, a gramophone dating from the 1920s and a portrait of Queen Victoria.

Shortages of fabrics during the war forced the introduction of the Utility Scheme in June 1941. All garments, even handkerchiefs, had to carry the CC41 symbol, indicating that they conformed to the regulated fabric amounts. This extended to all household textiles including tea towels as well as to furniture and other household items. The scheme continued until 1949. The hostess wears a printed rayon dress that bears the Utility label. 'Make Do and Mend' was one of the many war time slogans designed to encourage the public to recycle old out-of-date clothes.

A child's dress on display is a perfect example of this as it has been altered from an adult's and dates to 1943. The family are welcoming guests to afternoon tea - wartime food rationing would make the home-made scones, jam and cake on offer a very special treat."

=== Library ===
In the library, one can observe a scene which plays on 31 December 1952.

"It is 31 December 1952 and the family have been invited to the annual Hogmanay Ball by the Dumfries Chamber of Commerce at the Assembly Rooms. Father, mother and daughter are just gathering their bags, gloves and coats. On display are lovely examples of 1950s evening dresses including the daughter's dress, c1950, which is made of black machine made cotton lace over black taffeta with festoon and raised flower decorations made of sequins and beads and pink nylon "horsehair" rosettes with pearlised edges, made by the Cruikshank Salon, Greensmith Downes, Princes Street. Edinburgh.

Several prints hang on the walls, all connected to the Stewart family. A portrait of Captain William Stewart (1879 -1930) hangs over the fireplace, commissioned from David Alison in about 1913. On either side of the fireplace hang portraits of William Craik of Arbigland (artist unknown) and his wife, Elizabeth Stewart of Shambellie, by William de Nune, painted in the 1740s"

=== Hall ===
"The hall of any house is intended to say something important about its owner. For someone visiting the house for the first time it would convey the owner's status, wealth and taste. They would be asked to wait in the hall for some time giving them a chance to survey the paintings, furniture and other trophies. Hopefully they would be suitably impressed!

In the hall of Shambellie House stands a grandfather clock by D Duff, Paisley, mid 19th century and a long bench, one of several used until recently in the library of the National Museum of Antiquities of Scotland, Queen Street, Edinburgh.

There are photographs of William Stewart of Shambellie, the builder of the house, and his wife, Katherine Hardie and portrait of his father, also William Stewart (1750-1844) painted in about 1790 by an unknown artist."

=== Upstairs landing ===
"The linen cupboard shows some of the Museum's collection of household linen, other soft furnishings and lavender bags. Strict regimes were often laid down about household linen; items were often marked as to what belonged to each room and exact timetables were adhered to for changing beds and towels.

Laundry was usually done once a week with one or two people from the village being brought in especially for the extremely heavy work of boiling, washing, drying and ironing. Fine and delicate items would be laundered separately.

Winter curtains and other furnishings were often changed for summer ones in the spring and vice-versa. The un-used sets being cleaned and store in cupboards such as these. Lavender and other perfumed sachets were employed to give the linens a sweet smell and to keep away moths.

Along the bedroom corridors are hung various engravings including fashion plates and portraits."

=== Bedroom ===
A day in September 1945 is shown in the bedroom.

"In this room visitors see an older woman and her granddaughter are getting dressed for a local ball to celebrate the end of British military action in the Far East. The Second World War is usually taken to have ended on the 8th of May 1945 when fighting ceased in Europe. However many British families and communities had to wait until the autumn to celebrate the homecoming of loved ones

The grandmother is wearing a black satin evening dress with a pattern of flowers and leaves in green and cream. It is in a typical 1940s style with broad shoulders and a sweet-heart neckline. New long dresses were not available to buy during the war, so it may have been adapted from an existing dress, or made from material bought before 1939. Everyone in Britain had the same restricted access to new clothing during the war. However, the wealthier sections of society began the war with bigger wardrobes and therefore it was easier for them to 'keep up appearances'.

Her granddaughter is wearing a red velvet dress of 1943, which has been made from adult's clothing. This is another good example of how even wealthy people had to 'Make do and Mend' during the war.

A set of brushes and bottles on the dressing table were a wedding present to Mrs Kathleen Bibby in 1932. The hairdryer is typical of those used in the 1930s.

Country houses can be notoriously cold, even in September, therefore the grandmother has the luxury of an electric hot water bottle to ensure a good night's sleep. A 1930's electric fire stands in the hearth.

The rug is from Sanandaj, Iran about 1870."

=== Playroom ===
A scene of an early evening in August 1913 is presented in the playroom.

"Here we see the nanny is caring for the latest addition to the family. Toys, clothes and baby paraphernalia are strewn around the room. Centre stage is a beautifully carved wooden rocking horse. In this scene the mother is off to an afternoon function and wears a high-waisted day dress, circa1910, made of maroon wool with a woven strip with a deep band of net edged with maroon velvet forms a low decorative collar; this is heavily embroidered with silk and metal thread.

The little boy wears a traditional white summer sailor suit. The young Prince Edward first started the trend for sailor suits when he posed for a portrait by the painter Winterhalter in 1846 dressed in an exact replica made by the official naval outfitters. It remained a popular outfit for boys throughout the second part of the 19th and early 20th century. Wide brimmed straw hats trimmed with a ribbon complemented these.

A high chair, perambulator and wheeled baby chair are also on display.

Samplers are also displayed around the walls - these are typically Scottish and reflect the themes young girls would have been encouraged to use as suitable subjects whilst learning the different techniques of embroidery and needlework.

Alongside these are paintings of Dorothea and Euphemia Stewart, the 14th and 15th children of William Stewart (1750 -1844) and his first wife, Anne Murray, painted in about 1803 by John Allen of Dumfries."

=== Room with a view ===
"This former bedroom has the best views in the house and has been deliberately left so that visitors can circulate freely and appreciate why this site was chosen for the house. On the walls some information is given about the village of New Abbey and the building of Shambellie.

From one of the windows the ruins of Sweetheart Abbey can just be seen and on a clear day, in the far distance, the hills of Cumbria. Criffel, the mountain that dominates the skyline for miles around, can be seen from the other window. All around are the woods and forestry plantations of the Shambellie estate.

In the next door rooms are displayed some of the pieces from Charles Stewart's collection which do not fit into the themes or time-scale of the period rooms. At present the theme is fancy dress. Fancy dress was extremely popular for parties and balls in Victorian times. People sometimes posed for portraits in costumes from classical or romantic costume and a number of wonderful costumes are on display including an '18th century Venetian woman' outfit probably from the 1930s, a Pierrot costume made from curtaining material, and worn by Sydney E Taylor, who won First Prize in it at a ball on board ship for Brazil about 1920-5 and part of an 1890s 'Knave of Hearts' costume."

=== Bathroom ===
One can watch an early morning scene in November 1905 in the bathroom.

"A Paisley shawl is hung on a towel rail in front of the bath. These shawls were highly fashionable for women's daywear until around 1870. By 1905 a beautiful Paisley shawl might still have been used to visit a chilly country house bathroom.

The lady has braved the elements allowing a glimpse of her beautifully embroidered cotton nightgown of about 1905. She has rolled her hair in strips of cotton the night before. This was a popular way to ensure curled hair.

The bidet is late 18th century and was bequeathed to the Museum by Lady Clementina Waring.

The linen is from the Museum collections and the other items are lent by the Stewart family."

=== Sitting room ===
A late summer afternoon in 1882 is presented in the sitting room.

"The home, in Victorian times, was regarded as a haven from the busy world of commerce and politics outside. It was the domain of women who were expected to create cosy, comfortable surroundings. Women strove to be respectable, capable and accomplished home-makers who had to manage servants, budgets and plan menus for the household. Pastimes of this period reflected this ideal of domesticity in sewing and embroidery as well as painting, drawing, reading and playing music.

This room features four figures in clothes that date from the 1873 to early 1880s period. It was typical of the time that some people wore more up-to-date styles than others; whether people wore the very latest fashions depended on their tastes, income and also their age.

This period saw many changes in the fashionable body shape or silhouette that are clearly shown by the outfits displayed. All four dresses are examples of the bustle style, which was a way of exaggerating the size and shape of the bottom through the use of specialised underwear.

A purple silk dress highlights the fact that new technologies were being developed in the Victorian era. In the 1850s aniline dyes, the first synthetic dyes were invented and one of the first to be developed was aniline purple. This dress would have been worn by the most fashionable woman in the room as its shape and ruched, or gathered, detailing is typical of styles that can be seen in fashion plates and journals of the early 1880s.

A grey, silk dress on show was originally worn in 1873 by a Scottish bride, reflecting the popular practice of the time to wear coloured, formal day clothes for a wedding. White wedding dresses appeared from the mid-eighteenth century and became commonly worn from around 1800.

In the fireplace stands an embroidered fire screen with Daniel in the Lions Den, dating from about 1850-60. On the mantelpiece two hand screens can be seen that were used to shield the face from the fire."

=== Accessories room ===
"No outfit is ever complete without the right accessories. The plainest of dresses can look the height of glamour with the right bag & shoes. Fans & parasols are not so common now but were once an essential part of attire for the well dressed woman. The decoration lavished on these small articles is often quite stunning; their very size meant that expensive and even exotic materials were used to provide that unique look.

Here you can see beetle wing cases, tortoiseshell, ivory, pearls, feathers from exotic birds, and even in one case a whole humming-bird! (Attitudes have changed quite a lot to the use of animals in adornment)."

== Changes in costume ==
The way people dress changed over the years. Today's fashion is completely different from the fashion that was worn from the mid-19th to the mid-20th century.

=== From 1850 - 1900 ===
The 1850s are well known for the crinolines, which reached greatest popularity around 1860. The crinolines were made of whalebone and were covered with layers of flounced petticoats. The dresses were made of several materials such as brocade, taffeta, silk and velvet. There was a difference between dresses for the day and dresses for the evening. Dark coloured fabrics were usually used for day dresses. In complete contrast to this, the evening dresses were usually white. Very fashionable were also flounced dresses with flower prints, stripes and bands. The sleeves were worn wider; they were no longer fitted to the wrist.

Flounced dresses went out of fashion soon and women began to wear skirts over the crinoline frames. But not only the fabric changed, the colour did, too. There were used warmer tones like brown and dark red.

In the late 1860s, the crinolines disappeared and the bustles came into fashion in the 1870s. This led to a change in the dresses' shapes. The bustle, retained at the back, was worn under petticoats. Because of this bustle the gowns often had elaborate folds at the back. Typical for this type of dresses was the front fastening bodice. The bodice was used for shaping the body from the shoulder to the hips. In the 1880s, the so-called "princess line" was very fashionable. The princess line is defined by a bodice and a skirt which doesn't have a waist seam. The sleeves changed from wider to close fitting again. Special for the evening dresses were the short puffed sleeves. Also typical for this time were dresses made of two textiles and two colours. Usually, colours such as white, blue, lilac, grey, pink and pale brown were used but in the 1880s the colours became stronger.

=== From 1900 - 1950 ===
Probably the most important factors that influenced fashion worn in the first half of the 20th century were the Boer War (1899–1902), World War I (1914–1918) and World War II (1939–1945).

At the beginning of the century, the bulky skirts were replaced by the sheath line silhouette. The first hobble skirts showed up. They were close-fitting and often seemed to shackle below the knee. The hobble skirt period lasted for about 5 years. It ended in 1914 when the Great War began.

As already mentioned, the South African War also played a role in fashion. It influenced the design and colouring of women's dress. Examples for the influence are khaki hats and blouses with red applications or yellow skirts. Khaki, red and yellow are colours that can be found in traditional clothing of African peoples.

The Edwardian era (1901–1910) introduced a new style in women's underclothing. The underclothing was very different from the one that was worn in the 19th century. At the beginning of the 20th century, people became aware of the sex attraction underclothing is capable to display. Also en vogue was the so-called "Ulster". "Ulster" was the name that was used for certain top coats. Three-quarter and full-length capes with wide revers were very common at this time. In 1907, women wore coats that looked like men's morning coats and in 1908 ground-length coats came into fashion. In 1909, the so-called full-length or half-length "Russian" coat became popular. The "Russian" coat was characterized by a belt and an embroidered border. Coats with horizontal decoration bands or with big buttons became fashionable, too.

The changes in fashion which had begun at the very beginning of the 20th century were suppressed by new styles that arose during World War I. Between 1913 and 1916, the brassiere was introduced and the emphasis in evening dresses was put on the bosom. However, from 1915 on, skirts became wider and shorter and the cut of jackets and coats was influenced by the army officer's tunic. In 1918, waists and the bosom did not play a big role anymore. The middle of the body became more important. This resulted in the attempt to introduce a "National Standard Dress", which ended unsuccessfully.

After the war there was a backsliding in fashion to 1913. Skirts were longer and the hobble skirt was en vogue again; but also tight tube-like dresses were worn in these days. This led to a reduction of the mass of underclothing and put more emphasis on the body itself. From 1920 to 1930, the focus in fashion was on youth. This was an effect of the war since the death of many young men resulted in a glorification of the male youth. It became typical for girls to flatten their breasts and to hide their waist since this was the ideal of a girl in this time. The beginning recovery of economy might be the factor that brought a change in fashion again in 1925. Women's clothes, especially evening wear, were cut in a more feminine line but important to mention the ideal of the youthfulness was still alive. The first skirts with a flare and flounces were introduced. As the skirts had been very short up to that point, from 1928 on they became longer. Also important to mention is the emergence of the zip fastener. First used in the U.S. Navy, it was found in 1925 in Britain, too.

With the Great Depression came the change to a feminine ideal of womanliness again. The waist line was put higher and the skirts became longer. In addition, the cut of women's clothes was more complex, which made a more elegant silhouette. In contrast to the day costume, the evening costume exudes much more sex appeal.

Furthermore, royal occasions had influence on fashion in the 1930s, e.g. the marriage of the Duke of Kent to Princess Marina of Greece in 1934, the Silver Jubilee of King George V in 1935 and the Coronation of King George VI and Queen Elizabeth in 1937. The wardrobes of women with fashion awareness contained Marina hats, Jubilee blue and Royal purple.

During World War II, the woman's wardrobe was reduced to a minimum. In 1942, "utility" clothes were introduced. The utility clothes included suits, dresses and top coats. The standard patterns for these clothes were produced by a committee of designers. The prices for these clothes were controlled. Something special about it was the label that looked like a double crescent, which all clothes carried. The "utility" clothes should create a uniform style for all civilians, even though the manufactures achieved differences in the clothes.

The end of war brought a tenor among women for anti-uniforms, longer skirts and curves. After the traditional materials reappeared, the new synthetics and plastics came up in 1946. Christian Dior created the "New Look" in France at this time. This look did not find real acceptance in Britain.

In 1949, the next remarkable change in costume started. The skirts length was reduced from very long to thirteen inches from the ground. The shape was a middle course between wide and slim. As a lot of women had to wear trousers during the war, they began to wear trousers by choice at this point.

Together with the synthetics and plastics, nylon also emerged in 1946. In the post-war years, nylon was available for people from ex-R.A.F. parachutes. People began to make blouses, lingerie, children's wear, curtains and several other things out of these parachutes.

== Site closure ==
As a consequence of the economic recession, National Museums Scotland announced the site was to close in January 2013.

== Bibliography ==
- Alan Mansfield & Phillis Cunnington (1973). Handbook of English Costume in the Twentieth century, 1900-1950. London: Faber and Faber Limited, ISBN 978-0823801435
- Iris Brooke (1972). A History of English Costume. New York: Theatre Arts Books
