= List of baronetcies in the Baronetage of Ireland =

Peerages and baronetcies of Britain and Ireland
Extant	All
Dukes	Dukedoms
Marquesses	Marquessates
Earls	Earldoms
Viscounts	Viscountcies
Barons	Baronies
Baronets	Baronetcies
En, Ire, NS, GB, UK (extinct)

This is a list of baronetcies in the Baronetage of Ireland. There were first created in 1619, and was replaced by the Baronetage of the United Kingdom in 1800. The list is in alphabetical order.

This list is not currently complete.

== A ==
Title	Date of creation	Surname	Current status	Notes
Alen of St Wolstans	1622	Alen	extinct 1627	
Annesley of Newport Pagnell	1620	Annesley	extant	first Baronet created Viscount Valentia in 1622 – Premier Baronet of Ireland
Arragh of Arragh	1624	Arragh	extinct 1626	
Aylmer of Balrath	1662	Aylmer, Whitworth-Aylmer	extant	seventh Baronet succeeded as Baron Aylmer in 1766
Aylmer of Donadea	1622	Aylmer	extant	

== B ==
Title	Date of creation	Surname	Current status	Notes
Barret of Iniscarry	1631	Baret	extinct 1648	
Barrett of Newburgh	1628	Barett	extinct 1645	first Baronet created Lord Barrett in 1627
Barrett of Castlemore	1665	Barrett	extinct 1673	
Barry of Dublin	1775	Barry	extinct or dormant c.1895	
Bateson of Killoquin	1789	Bateson, Bateson-Harvey	extinct 1870	
Bath of Athcarne	1666	Bath	extinct 1686	
Batersby of Tyrone	1687	Batersby, Battersby, Badersby	dormant	
Bayly of Plas Newydd	1730	Bayly, Paget	extant	third Baronet had already succeeded as Baron Paget de Beaudesert in 1769, created Earl of Uxbridge in 1784; second Earl created Marquess of Anglesey in 1815
Barnewall of Crickstown	1623	Barnewall	extant	
Bellew of Barmeath	1688	Bellew	dormant	seventh Baronet was created Baron Bellew in 1848; Baronetcy dormant, under review (11th Baronet died 1975)
Bellingham of Dublin	1667	Bellingham	extinct 1699	
Beresford of Coleraine	1665	Beresford	extant	fourth Baronet created Earl of Tyrone in 1746; second Earl created Marquess of Waterford in 1789
Blaquiere of Ardkill	1784	Blaquiere	extinct 1920	first Baronet was created Baron de Blaquiere in 1800
Blackwood of Ballyleidy	1763	Blackwood	dormant	third Baronet succeeded as Baron Dufferin and Claneboye in 1800; Baronetcy dormant (10th Baronet died 1988)
Blake of Galway	1622	Blake	extant	
Blundell of Edendeny	1620	Blundell	extinct 1756	third Baronet created Viscount Blundell in 1720
Blunden of Castle Blunden	1766	Blunden	extant	
Bond of Coolamber	1794	Bond	extinct 1823	
Bond of Peckham	1658	Bond	extinct 1767	
Borrows of Grangemellon	1646	Borrowes	extinct 1939	
Boulen of Holland	1623	Boulen	extinct c. 1660	
Bourke of Kilpeacon	1645	Bourke	extinct c.1707	
Brabazon of Newpark	1797	Brabazon	extinct 1840	
Bradstreet of Castilla	1759	Bradstreet	extinct 1924	
Bramhall of Rathmullen	1662	Bramhall	extinct 1667	
Brooke of Colebrooke	1764	Brooke	extinct 1785	
Browne of Kishack	1622	Browne	extinct 1682	
Browne of Palmerston	1797	Brabazon	extinct 1890	
Browne of Molahiffe	1622	Browne	extinct 1952	seventh Baronet created Earl of Kenmare in 1801
Bulkeley of Dunlaven	1672	Bulkeley	extinct 1710	
Burke of Glinsk	1628	Burke	extinct 1909	
Burke of Marble Hill	1797	Burke	extant	
Burton of Pollacton	1758	Bradstreet	extinct 1902	
Butler of Cloughgrenan	1628	Butler	extant	
Butler of Polestown	1645	Bourke	extinct or dormant c.1762	

== C ==
Title	Date of creation	Surname	Current status	Notes
Caldwell of Rossberg	1683	Caldwell	extinct 1858	
Carden of Templemore	1787	Carden	extant	
Chapman of Killua Castle	1782	Chapman	extinct 1919	
Chinnery of Flintfield	1799	Chinnery	extinct 1868	
Cogan of Greenwich	1657	Cogan	extinct 1660	
Colclough of Tintern Abbey	1628	Colclough	extinct 1687	
Cole of Newland	1661	Cole	extinct 1754	second Baronet created Baron Ranelagh in 1715
Colthurst of Ardrum	1744	Colthurst	extant	
Cooke of Dublin	1741	Cooke	extinct 1758	
Cooper of Dublin	1758	Cooper	extinct 1761	
Coote of Castle Cuffe	1621	Coote	extant	
Coote of Donnybrooke	1774	Coote	extinct 1922	
Cotter of Rockforest	1763	Cotter	extant	
Courtenay of Newcastle	1621	Courtenay	extinct c. 1700	
Cox of Castletown	1706	Cox	extinct 1873	
Crofton of the Mote	1758	Crofton	dormant	fourth Baronet succeeded as Baron Crofton in 1817; Baronetcy dormant (9th Baronet died 1989) – under review
Crofton of the Mote	1661	Crofton	extinct 1780	
Cromie of Stacrombie	1776	Cromie	extinct 1841	
Crooke of Baltimore	1624	Crooke	extinct c. 1666	
Crosbie of Maryborough	1630	Crosbie	extinct 1936	
Cusack-Smith of Tuam	1799	Smyth, Cusack-Smith	extinct 1970	

== D ==
Title	Date of creation	Surname	Current status	Notes
Dancer of Modreeny	1662	Dancer	extinct 1933	
Deane of Muskerry	1710	Deane	dormant	sixth Baronet created Baron Muskerry in 1781; Baronetcy dormant (11th Baronet died 1954)
De Burgo of Castle Conel	1785	Blaquiere, Bourke, de Bourgho, de Burgho	extinct 1873	
De Montmorency of Upper Wood	1758	Morres, de Montmorency	extinct 1829	
De Vere of Curragh	1784	Hunt, de Vere	extinct 1904	
Denny of Castle More	1782	Denny	extant	
Des Voeux of Indiaville	1787	des Voeux	extinct 1944	
Domvile of Templeogue	1686	Domvile	extinct 1768	
Dowdall of Athlumney	1663	Dowdall	forfeit 1691	
Dungan of Castletown	1623	Dungan	extinct 1715	fourth Baronet created Earl of Limerick in 1686

== E ==
Title	Date of creation	Surname	Current status	Notes
Eaton of Dunmoylin	1682	Eaton	extinct 1697	
Echlin of Clonagh	1721	Echlin	extinct 2007	
Esmonde of Clonegall	1629	Esmonde	extant	
Eustace of Castle Martin	1685	Eustace	forfeit 1691	
Evans of Kilcreene	1683	Evans	extinct 1690	
Everard of Ballybay	1622	Everard	extinct c.1740	

== F ==
Title	Date of creation	Surname	Current status	Notes
Falkiner of Anne Mount	1778	Falkiner	dormant	ninth Baronet died 1997
Fenton of Mitchelstown	1661	Fenton	extinct 1671	
Fetherston of Ardagh	1776	Fetherston	extinct 1923	
ffrench of Castle ffrench	1779	ffrench, French	extant	second Baronet succeeded as Baron ffrench in 1805
Fish of Lissameon	1622	Fish	extinct c.1670	
Fitzgerald of Clenlish	1644	Fitzgerald	forfeit 1691	
Fitzharris of Kilfinin	1622	Fitzgerald	extinct c.1704	
Flood of Newton Ormond	1780	Flood	extinct 1824	
Forster of Coolderry	1794	Forster	extinct 1904	
Fownes of Dublin	1724	Echlin	extinct 1778	
Freke of Castle Freke	1768	Freke, Evans-Freke	extant	second Baronet succeeded as Baron Carbery in 1807

== G ==
Title	Date of creation	Surname	Current status	Notes
Galwey of Kallwollin	1624	Galwey	extinct c. 1700	
Gethin of Gethinsgrott	1665	Gethin	extant	
Gifford of Castle Jordan	1661	Gifford	extinct 1662	
Gillman of Curraheen	1799	Gillman	extinct 1817	Created on 1 October 1799 for John St Leger Gillman (1756–1817). The title became extinct upon the first baronet's death without male heirs.
Gleadowe-Newcomen of Carrickglass	1781	Gleadowe-Newcomen	extinct 1825	second Baronet succeeded as Viscount Newcomen in 1817
Godfrey of Bushfield	1785	Godfrey	extinct 1971	
Gore of Lissadill	1760	Gore, Gore-Booth	extant	
Gore of Manor Gore	1622	Gore	extant	
Gore of Newtown Gore	1662	Gore	extant	third Baronet created Earl of Arran in 1760
Gore of Magherabegg	1622	Gore	extant	
Gorges-Meredyth of Catharines Grove	1787	Gorges-Meredyth	extinct 1821	

== H ==
Title	Date of creation	Surname	Current status	Notes
Haman of Woodhouse	1727	Haman	extinct 1728	
Hamilton of Dunamana	1781	Hamilton	extinct 1818	
Hamilton of Manor Cunningham	1775	Hamilton	extinct 1782	
Hamilton of Monilla	1662	Hamilton	extinct 1682	
Hamilton of Mount Hamilton	1683	Hamilton	extinct c.1730	
Hamilton of Donalong	1660	Hamilton	extant	second Baronet succeeded as Earl of Abercorn in 1701
Hartstonge of Bruff	1681	Hartstonge	extinct 1797	
Hayes of Drumboe Castle	1789	Hayes	extinct 1912	
Herbert of Derrogh	1630	Herbert	extinct 1712	
Hill of Brook Hill	1779	Hill	extant	
Hoare of Annabella	1784	Hoare	extant	
Hodson of Holybrook House	1789	Hodson	extant	
Hopkins of Athboy	1795	Hopkins	extinct 1860	
Horsfall of Kilkenny	1642	Horsfall	extinct c.1693	
Hurly of Knockalong	1645	Hurly	forfeit 1691	
Hutchinson, later Synge-Hutchinson of Castlesallagh	1782	Hutchinson, Synge-Hutchison	extinct 1906	

== I ==
Title	Date of creation	Surname	Current status	Notes
Irvine of Castle Irvine	1677	Irvine	extinct 1689	

== J ==
Title	Date of creation	Surname	Current status	Notes
Jervis-White-Jervise of Bally Ellis	1797	Jervis-White-Jervise	extinct 1947	
Johnson-Walsh of Dublin	1775	Johnson, Johnson-Walsh	extinct 1953	
Johnston of Gilford	1772	Johnston	extinct 1841	

== K ==
Title	Date of creation	Surname	Current status	Notes
Kennedy of Newtownmountkennedy	1666	Kennedy	forfeit 1710	
King of Boyle Abbey	1682	King, King-Tenison	extant	fifth Baronet created Earl of Kingston in 1768; Baronetcy unproven (5th Baronet died 2002) – under review

== L ==
Title	Date of creation	Surname	Current status	Notes
Lake of Carnow	1661	Lake	extinct 1674	
Lane of Tulske	1661	Lane	extinct 1724	second Baronet created Viscount Lanesborough in 1676
Langford of Kilmackedrett	1667	Langford	extinct c.1725	
Langrishe of Knocktopher	1777	Langrishe	extant	
Lawless of Abington	1776	Lawless	extinct 1929	first Baronet was created Baron Cloncurry in 1789
Leigh of Tyrone	1622	Leigh	extinct 1638	
Leslie of Tarbert	1787	Leslie	extinct 1818	
Levinge of Knockdrin Castle	1704	Levinge	extant	
Lighton of Merville	1791	Lighton	extant	
Loftus of Mount Loftus	1768	Loftus	extinct 1864	
Lumm of Lumville	1775	Lumm	extinct 1797	
Lynch-Blosse of Galway	1622	Lynch, Lynch-Blosse	extant	

== M ==
Title	Date of creation	Surname	Current status	Notes
Macartney of Nish	1799	Macartney	extant	
Macdonnell of Maye	1627	Macdonnell	forfeit 1691	
MacMahon of Clondirrala	1628	MacMahon	extinct c. 1680	
Magill of Gill Hall	1680	Magill	extinct 1700	
Magrath of Allevolan	1629	Magrath	extinct c. 1670	
Mannix of Richmond	1787	Mannix	extinct 1822	
Loftus of Loftus Hall	1780	Tottenham, Loftus	extant	second baronet (succeeded 1786) had been created Baron Loftus in 1785; he was Viscount Loftus from 1789, Earl of Ely from 1794 and Marquess of Ely from 1800
Massy of Donass	1782	Massy, Massey	extinct 1870	
Maude of Dondrum	1705	Maude	dormant	third Baronet created Viscount Hawarden in 1791; Baronetcy dormant (10th Baronet died 1991) – under review
May of Mayfield	1763	May	extinct 1834	
Meade of Meadstown	1703	Mead	extant	fourth Baronet created Earl Clanwilliam in 1776
Meredyth of Carlanstown	1795	Meredyth	extinct 1923	
Meredyth of Greenhills	1660	Hamilton	extinct 1904	
Miller of Glenlee	1788	Miller	extant	
Molyneux of Castle Dillon	1730	Molyneux	extinct 1940	
Moore of Ross	1681	Moore	extant	
Morres of Castlemorres	1631	Morres, de Montmonrency	extant	
Mullins of Ventry	1797	Mullins, de Moleyns, Eveligh-de-Moleyns	extant	first Baronet created Baron Ventry in 1800
Musgrave of Tourin	1782	Musgrave	extant	

== N ==
Title	Date of creation	Surname	Current status	Notes
Newcomen of Kenagh	1623	Newcomen	extinct 1789	
Newport of Newpark	1789	Newport	extinct 1859	
Norton of Charlton	1624	Norton	extinct c. 1690	
Nugent of Ballinlough	1795	Nugent	extant	Name changed from O'Reilly by Royal Licence of 1812
Nugent of Donore	1768	Nugent	extinct 1799	
Nugent of Dysery	1782	Nugent	extinct c. 1813	
Nugent of Moyrath	1622	Nugent	extant	

== O ==
Title	Date of creation	Surname	Current status	Notes
O'Brien of Leaghmenagh	1686	O'Brien	extant	fifth Baronet succeeded as Baron Inchiquin in 1855; Baronetcy dormant (eleventh Baron and ninth Baronet died 1982)
O'Connor of Sligo	1622	O'Connor	extinct 1625	
O'Donnell of Newport House	1780	O'Donnell, O'Donell	extinct 1889	
O'Neill of Killelagh	1666	O'Neill	forfeit 1691	
O'Neill of Upper Claneboys	1643	O'Neill	dormant 1799	
Osborne of Ballentaylor	1629	Osborne	extant	

== P ==
Title	Date of creation	Surname	Current status	Notes
Palmer of Castle Lackin	1777	Palmer	extinct 1910	
Parnell of Rathleague	1766	Parnell	extant	fourth Baronet created Baron Congleton in 1841
Parsons of Birr Castle	1677	Parsons	extant	fifth Baronet succeeded as Earl of Rosse in 1807
Parsons of Bellamont	1620	Parsons	extinct 1764	third Baronet created Viscount Rosse in 1681
Paul of Paulville	1794	Paul	extinct 1961	
Perceval of Kanturk	1661	Perceval	extinct 2011	fifth Baronet created Earl of Egmont in 1733
Pierce of Pierce Court	1622	Pierce	extinct c. 1649	
Piers of Tristernagh Abbey	1661	Piers	extant	
Prendergast of Gort	15 July 1699	Prendergast	extinct 1760	

== R ==
Title	Date of creation	Surname	Current status	Notes
Reading of Dublin	1675	Reading	extinct 1689	
Reynell of Laleham	1678	Reynell	extinct 1848	
Ribton of Woodbrook	1760	Ribton	extinct 1901	
Richardson of Aughre	1787	Richardson, Richardson-Bunbury	extant	
Riggs-Miller of Ballicasey	1778	Riggs-Miller	extinct 1828	
Roche of Fermoy	1782	Roche	extinct 1807	

== S ==
Title	Date of creation	Surname	Current status	Notes
Sands of Dublin	1676	Sands	extinct c. 1704	
Sarsfield of Carrickleamlery	1619	Sarsfield	forfeit 1691	first Baronet created Viscount Sarsfield in 1627
Shaen of Kilmore	1663	Dowdall	extinct 1725	
Shee of Dunmore	1794	Shee	extinct 1870	
Smyth of Tinny Park	1776	Smyth	extinct 1797	
Somerville of Somerville	1748	Somerville	dormant	fifth Baronet created Baron Athlumney in 1863, which title became extinct in 1929; Baronetcy dormant (second Baron and sixth Baronet died in 1929)
Southwell of Castlemattress	1662	Southwell	extant	second Baronet created Baron Southwell in 1717
St George of Carrickdrumrusk	1660	St George	extinct 1735	second Baronet created Baron St George in 1715
St George of Woodsgift	1766	St George	extant	
Staples of Lissone	1628	Staples	extinct or dormant 2013	
Staunton of Cargins	1785	Staunton	extinct 1859	
Steele of Hampstead	1768	Steele	extinct or dormant 1876	
Stewart of Ramalton	1623	Stewart	extant	
Style of Beckenham	1624	Style	extinct 1659	

== T ==
Title	Date of creation	Surname	Current status	Notes
Taylour of Kells	1704	Taylour	extant	third Baronet created Earl of Bective in 1766, second Earl created Marquess of Headfort in 1800; Baronetcy unproven (9th Baronet died 2005) – under review
Talbot of Belfast	1790	Talbot	extinct 1850	
Talbot of Carton	1623	Talbot	forfeit 1691	
Trant of Portarlington	1686	Trant	forfeit 1691	
Treswell of the Army	1665	Kennedy	extinct 1670	
Tufton of Vintners	1623	Tufton	extinct 1664	
Tuite of Sonagh	1622	Tuite	extant	
Tydd of Lamberton	1795	Tydd	extinct 1803	
Tynte of Dunlaven	1778	Tynte	extinct 1785	

== V ==
Title	Date of creation	Surname	Current status	Notes
Vesey of Abbey Leix	1698	Vesey	dormant	second Baronet created Baron Knapton in 1750 and Viscount de Vesci 1776; Baronetcy dormant (sixth Viscount and seventh Baronet died 1983)

== W ==
Title	Date of creation	Surname	Current status	Notes
Waller of Newport	1780	Waller	extant	unproven (ninth Baronet died 2003) – under review
Walsh of Little Ireland	1645	Walsh	extinct c. 1690	
Ward of Killagh	1682	Ward	extinct 1691	
Warren of Warren Court	1784	Warren	extant	
Weldon of Dunmore	1723	Weldon	extant	
Wheeler-Denny-Cuffe of Leyrath	1800	Wheeler-Denny-Cuffe, Wheeler-Cuffe	extinct 1934	
Wilmot of Witney	1621	Wilmot	extinct 1629	
Wilson of Killenure	1629	Wilson	extinct 1636	
Wolseley of Mount Wolseley	1745	Wolseley	dormant	twelfth Baronet died 1991

== Y ==
Title	Date of creation	Surname	Current status	Notes
Yorke of Dublin	1761	Yorke	extinct 1776	

== See also ==
- List of extant Baronetcies
- List of baronetcies in the Baronetage of England
- List of baronetcies in the Baronetage of Nova Scotia
- List of baronetcies in the Baronetage of the United Kingdom
- List of baronetcies in the Baronetage of Great Britain
