= John Fish =

John Fish may refer to:

- John Fish (businessman), American businessman
- John Charles Lounsbury Fish (1870–1962), professor of civil engineering
- Sir John Fish, 1st Baronet (died 1623), of the Fish baronets
- John Fish (1758-1834), Admiral, M.P. for Wexford
- Jack Fish (American football) (1892–1971), American football coach
- Jack Fish (rugby league) (1878–1940), English rugby league footballer

== See also ==
- Jack Fish (disambiguation)
