= Wilson baronets =

Baronetage of England, Ireland and the UK

There have been eight baronetcies created for persons with the surname Wilson, one in the Baronetage of England, one in the Baronetage of Ireland and six in the Baronetage of the United Kingdom. Wilson baronets may refer to:

- Wilson baronets of Killenure (1629)
- Wilson (later Maryon-Wilson) baronets, of Eastbourne (1661): see Maryon-Wilson baronets
- Wilson baronets of Delhi (1858)
- Wilson baronets of Eshton Hall (1874)
- Wilson baronets of Archer House (1897): see Sir Alexander Wilson, 1st Baronet (1837–1907)
- Wilson baronets of Airdrie (1906)
- Wilson baronets of Currygrane (1919): see Sir Henry Wilson, 1st Baronet (1864–1922)
- Wilson baronets of Carbeth (1920)

== See also ==
- Wilson-Todd baronets
