= Galwey =

Galwey is a surname. Notable people with the surname include:

- Mick Galwey (born 1966), Irish rugby union and Gaelic footballer
- Galwey baronets
