= Jackfish Lake =

Jackfish Lake may refer to:

- Jackfish Lake (Alberta), a lake in Alberta, Canada
- Jackfish Lake (Saskatchewan), a lake in Saskatchewan, Canada
- Jackfish Lake, Saskatchewan, a community in Saskatchewan

== See also ==
- Jack Fish (disambiguation)
