= Jack Fish =

Jack Fish may refer to:

- Jack Fish (American football) (1892–1971), American football coach
- Jack Fish (rugby league) (1878–1940), English rugby league footballer

== See also ==
- Jackfish Lake (disambiguation)
- John Fish (disambiguation)
