= Fish baronets =

Extinct baronetcy in the Baronetage of Ireland

The Fish Baronetcy, of Lissameon in the County of Cavan, was a title in the Baronetage of Ireland. It was created on 12 February 1622 for John Fish. The title became extinct on the death of the third Baronet circa 1670.

Sir John Fish's daughter Ann married as his second wife Sir George Sexton of Limerick, one-time secretary to the Lord Deputy of Ireland, in 1619. Their marriage settlement still exists.

== Fish baronets, of Lissameon (1622) ==
- Sir John Fish, 1st Baronet (died 1623)
- Sir Edward Fish, 2nd Baronet (c. 1598 – 1658)
- Sir Edward Fish, 3rd Baronet (c. 1628 – c. 1670)
