= British nobility =

Nobility in the United Kingdom

The British nobility is made up of the peerage and the gentry of the British Isles.

Though the UK is today a constitutional monarchy with strong democratic elements, historically the British Isles were more predisposed towards aristocratic governance in which power was largely inherited and shared amongst a privileged noble class. The nobility of the four constituent home nations and crown dependencies therefore has played a major role in shaping the history of the British Isles, and remnants of this nobility exist throughout the UK's social structure and institutions.

Traditionally, the British nobility rank directly below the British royal family. In the modern era, this ranking is more of a formally recognised social dignity, rather than something conveying practical authority; however, through bodies such as the House of Lords, the nature of some offices in the Royal Household, and British property law, the British nobility retain some aspects of political and legal power.

The vast majority of the British nobility (in the Continental sense) is formed by the 'Gentry', which primarily consists of those who hold a coat of arms, but holds ranks including baronets, knights, esquires and gentlemen.

All ranks and titles of nobility in the British Isles that are higher than Gentleman are strictly personal and limited to the lifetime of the holder, though many can be transmitted by primogeniture, usually to heirs male of the body of the original recipient. Male-line descendants of members of the royal family, peers, baronets, knights and esquires do not sink below the rank of Gentleman as long as they are armigerous. Coats of arms are marks of nobility in Britain unlike on the Continent, where a grant of arms does not necessarily result in ennoblement or confirmation of nobility.

The British nobility should not be confused with the British upper class, though functionally the nobility may be said to make up a significant portion of the upper class. Those belonging to the upper or upper middle class are able to formally accede to the nobility by obtaining a grant of arms.

== Definition ==
Historian J. V. Beckett noted that the use of nobility has changed throughout British history. In early 14th century England, it referred to the governing class of around 3,000 landowners with incomes of £20 a year or more, whether earls, barons, knights or esquires. As the English Parliament developed a bicameral structure, a more precise distinction arose between the hereditary peerage in the House of Lords and the lesser ranks of knights and esquires.

The defining features of the nobility were possession of a coat of arms and gentility. Before the 16th century, the word gentle meant noble, and a gentleman originally meant a nobleman. In De Republica Anglorum, the scholar and diplomat Sir Thomas Smith (1513–1577) noted, "Of gentlemen, the first and chief are the king, the prince, the duke, marquesses, earls, viscounts, barons, and these are called the nobility, and all these are called lords and noblemen: next to these be knights, esquires and simple gentlemen." Smith described the peerage as the nobilitas major ('greater nobility') and the gentry as the nobilitas minor ('lesser nobility').

Over time, nobility came to refer almost exclusively to the peerage. This trend was exacerbated by the widespread and unregulated adoption of the titles esquire and gentleman. The writer James Henry Lawrence (1773–1840) noted in 1824 that "every plebian in England who lives above the vulgar has of late years presumed to style himself a gentleman."

== The peerage ==
The British nobility in the narrow sense consists of Peers. Members of the peerage carry the titles of duke, marquess, earl, viscount or baron (in Scotland historically lord of parliament). British peers are sometimes referred to generically as lords, although individual dukes are not so styled when addressed or by reference, and those holding some offices are afforded the title "Lord" by courtesy.

All modern British peerage dignities are created directly by the Crown and take effect when letters patent are issued, affixed with the Great Seal of the Realm. The Sovereign is considered to be the fount of honour and, as "the fountain and source of all dignities cannot hold a dignity from himself", cannot hold a British peerage. Peerages inherited by the Crown, for example those held by the Prince of Wales upon the demise of the monarch, merge with it and can be regranted to a new individual.

Membership in the Peerage is strictly personal and for life (life peerages) though often heritable (hereditary peerages) primarily by agnatic primogeniture with some exceptions. All British subjects who are not themselves Peers of the Realm are technically commoners, regardless of ancestry, wealth, or other social factors. This includes Princes of the United Kingdom who have not yet been granted a Peerage. The term "Commoner" does not imply that the person is not noble in the Continental sense, but rather that he is not a Peer and is therefore entitled to be elected to the House of Commons.

Unlike the feudal titles they replaced, peerages are personal title that cannot be transferred, bought, or sold by the title holder. Historically monarchs sold peerage titles under limited circumstances. This was often done to raise funds. For example, in the early Stuart period, King James I sold peerages, adding sixty-two peers to a body that had included just fifty-nine members at the commencement of his reign. Some governments through history also sold peerages to fund government activities, or more controversially, party activities. The selling of peerage grants by a government was made illegal in 1925 with the Honours (Prevention of Abuses) Act 1925. The act was the result of the administration of David Lloyd George selling a high number of controversial peerages. The Blair administration was later accused of trying to skirt this law in 2006 in the so-called "Cash-for-Honours scandal", as was an aide of King Charles in the 2021 Cash-for-Favours scandal.

=== Lists ===
==== Dukes ====
- Dukes in the United Kingdom
- List of dukes in the peerages of Britain and Ireland
- List of dukedoms in the peerages of Britain and Ireland
- List of dukedoms in the baronage of Scotland

==== Marquesses ====
- Marquesses in the United Kingdom
- List of marquesses in the peerages of Britain and Ireland
- List of marquessates in the peerages of Britain and Ireland
- List of marquessates in the baronage of Scotland

==== Earls ====
- Royal earldoms in the United Kingdom
- List of earls in the peerages of Britain and Ireland
- List of earldoms
- List of earldoms in the baronage of Scotland

==== Viscounts ====
- List of viscounts in the peerages of Britain and Ireland
- List of viscountcies in the peerages of Britain and Ireland

==== Barons/Lords of Parliament of Scotland ====
- Royal baronies in the United Kingdom
- List of barons in the peerages of Britain and Ireland
- List of baronies in the peerages of Britain and Ireland
- List of baronies in the baronage of Scotland
- List of life peerages
- List of lordships of Parliament

== The gentry ==
The vast majority of the British nobility is formed by the gentry. These individuals are commoners (in the British sense) who do not have a peerage, but possess another mark of nobility, or in the British sense, gentility.

Other than their designation, such as Gentleman or Esquire, they enjoy only the privilege of a position in the formal orders of precedence in the United Kingdom. The largest portion of the British aristocracy has historically been the landed gentry, made up of baronets and other non-titled armigerous landowners whose families hailed from the medieval feudal class (referred to as gentlemen due to their income solely deriving from land ownership). Roughly a third of British land is owned by the nobility and landed gentry.

=== Children of Peers ===
The eldest sons of Peers who are Earls or higher and possess multiple titles may use their father's next-lower title by courtesy, their own eldest sons may use the third-highest title and so on. They are not Peers but remain Esquires until they inherit the substantive peerage themselves. Until 1999, they could sit in the House of Lords by virtue of a writ of acceleration.

=== Baronets and knights ===
==== Baronets ====
Baronets are generally considered part of the gentry, being hereditarily titled but not Peers, and form the upper tier. They are entitled to the title "Sir/Lady [name]", and will be recognised as the "Baronet of [placename]". The position is therefore comparable with hereditary knighthoods in continental European orders of nobility, such as Ritter, rather than with knighthoods under the British orders of chivalry. However, unlike the continental orders, the British baronetcy system is a modern invention. Baronet titles cannot be bought and sold by the holder, however they were designed specifically to raise money for the Crown with the purchase of the title. No new Baronetcies have been issued since the 1980s, however there is nothing preventing future monarchs or governments from doing so.

==== Hereditary knights ====
In the British Isles, knighthoods are not hereditary, with the exception of three Irish hereditary knighthoods created for their kinsmen by the Earls of Desmond. Since 2011, all but one of the knighthoods are dormant. The only active one is the Knight of Kerry (Green Knight); the holder is Sir Adrian FitzGerald, 6th Baronet of Valencia, 24th Knight of Kerry. Unlike other knighthoods, they entitle the holder not to the title "Sir", but "Knight".

==== Knighthoods ====
Knighthoods in the UK are typically honours associated with orders of chivalry, with knights ranking in accordance with these orders. The exception is the lowest tier of knighthood, Knight Bachelor, which is not associated with any order. The sovereign serves as the fount of honour for all orders of chivalry in the UK, with the current system made up of six orders of chivalry and four orders of merit.

Not included in the six orders of chivalry, the Most Venerable Order of the Hospital of Saint John of Jerusalem, established in 1888 with a royal charter as a British successor to the Sovereign Military Hospitaller Order of Saint John of Jerusalem, is a royal order of chivalry dedicated to charitable work. Despite this recognition and the fact the higher ranks of the order are a form of knighthood, these ranks do not confer official rank in the order of precedence, and use of post-nominal initials (e.g., GCStJ, KStJ) are restricted dependent on jurisdiction. Recipients of knighthoods and damehoods in this order are not addressed as "Sir" and "Dame".

There is historically some dispute around the Order of Saint Joachim, which was established in 1755 by a group of nobles, in territory then held by the Holy Roman Empire, and confers knightly ranks. The order is not a British order of chivalry; however, writing in 1828, Windsor Herald Francis Townsend stated: "This Order owes its foundation to no crowned head, but has been recognised both in Great Britain and abroad, as an Order of Knighthood." Admiral Nelson is often cited as one of the most famous recipients of the order.

Historically, the rank of knight banneret (knights created by the sovereign on the field of battle) also existed, though it is disputed by historians whether any have been created since the time of George I. Traditionally, these knights would rank above all other members of the gentry, including baronets (or directly below baronets depending on the terms of creation).

=== Esquires and gentlemen ===
==== Esquires ====
The rank of Esquire in the British isles was historically a title of respect accorded to men of higher social rank than that of gentlemen. It dated from the military rank of squire, who was a personal attendant to a knight. In a more modern sense it served as a category indicating "candidates for knighthood", and was therefore typically associated with certain professions (such as judges, justices of the peace, and sheriffs). It was also associated with lords of the manor (who made up the traditional 'squirearchy'), as well as certain personal attendants and courtiers to the King, and those who had been presented with a Collar of Esses.

In a contemporary sense, Esquire is often used as a courtesy title in formal address, appended to a man's name when no other title is used, however this does not imply the recipient is actually considered to be at the rank of esquire. The heraldic authorities have specific criteria for whom they consider to be an esquire.

Sons of Peers, the primogeniture heirs of Knights as well as the heirs of certain individuals created such by the Crown are Esquires. A rare hereditary variety of English esquire is found in the West Country, primarily in Devonshire, called White Spur. Though it is possible there remain White Spur families in existence, the title is now not used. The form of usage or style was: "(Surname) the White Spur".

==== Gentlemen ====
The untitled nobility consists first and foremost of all those who bear formally matriculated, or recorded, armorial bearings (a coat of arms). The Sovereign Military Order of Malta considers armorial bearings as the main, if not sole, mark of gentility (untitled nobility) in Britain. Those who are noble but have no higher title or rank are Gentlemen. The next-higher rank is that of Esquire, which is usually not considered a title.

The only kind of gentility that is transmitted to all descendants (in the male line) is that established by a grant, matriculation or confirmation of arms. Men entitled to arms are archaically called gentlemen of coat armour. Lyon Innes of Learney introduced the term Noblesse referring specifically to the Scottish armigerous gentry, but it is unpopular with some modern heraldic enthusiasts.

In Scotland, arms are only transmitted by primogeniture and younger sons must matriculate differenced arms. Nevertheless, male-line descendants of an armiger who have not yet matriculated differenced arms are usually also considered gentlemen by birth.

Certain offices and ranks confer gentility or even the rank of Esquire for life or for the duration of office. This includes barristers, professors, doctors, military officers and senior civil servants. Those who hold or have held personal gentility or the designation of Esquire by office are generally considered eligible for a grant of arms and can thus obtain hereditary gentility fairly easily.

Eligibility for a grant of arms can also be established by social status alone. There are no fixed criteria but it is generally understood that only a minority of those who would theoretically be entitled to a grant make use of the possibility.

A grant of arms made to a person who is not a subject of the King, i.e. not a citizen of a Commonwealth realm, does not constitute the recipient a member of the British gentry. However, later naturalisation has constitutive effect and a new warrant is not needed, unlike for turning an honorary knighthood into a substantive one.

=== Clan chiefs ===
Scottish and Irish Clan chiefs and chieftains form a rank of nobility. The title is hereditary but succession is more flexible than with most other titles. In Scotland, only those recognised as such by the Lord Lyon are considered legitimate Chiefs and there is a procedure for Clans currently lacking a chief to choose one.

=== Feudal titles ===
Prior to the creation of the peerage, the nobility of the British isles was predominantly ordered according to feudalism. Feudal titles are the only titles that can be bought and sold freely by the holder, and are also not considered honours. For the most part there is no longer a formal tie between land and feudal titles in either England or Scotland, however many feudal titles are still connected to land rights. For example, the Marquess of Salisbury owns the mineral rights below Welwyn Garden City, not because of the peerage, but because he also owns the separate historic feudal title "Lord of the Manor of Hatfield" which granted these rights. Many feudal titles are still in the possession of noble families, and noble individuals owning Scottish baronies formerly enjoyed heraldic privileges. Some feudal titles held by Grand Serjeanty include (now) ceremonial offices of state, for example the King's Champion is an office held by the Lord of the Manor of Scrivelsby in Lincolnshire. It is often debated by experts whether a feudal title alone can in the present era constitute nobility. In theory for example, a Lord of the Manor automatically holds the rank of Esquire, but should theoretically only be considered noble if they also hold a coat of arms, and it is unclear whether the possession of such a title would always automatically confer eligibility. In practice however, this is moot as it does not appear the heraldic authorities have ever refused an application for arms to the owner of a feudal title.

==== Scottish feudal barons ====
In Scotland, a 'baron' or 'baroness' is a hereditary title of honour in the Baronage of Scotland, but distinct from peerages. Historically called feudal barons but in 2004, the Abolition of Feudal Tenure etc. (Scotland) Act abolished all feudal aspects of baronies while preserving the nobility and dignity of the titles. Today, baronies are non-territorial personal titles, otherwise known as incorporeal hereditaments, just like hereditary peerages, baronetcies and coat of arms but unlike them, can be transferred outside the bloodline or bequeathed to an appointed heir. Higher ranks within the Baronage of Scotland, such as lordship, earldom, marquessate, and dukedom, exist but are less common. Thomas Innes of Learney, a noted heraldic authority and former Lord Lyon King of Arms representing the monarch in Scotland, stated that Scottish barons are equivalent to Continental barons.

In contrast, feudal baronies including recognition for the titles were abolished in England and Ireland much earlier in the 16th century, having been replaced with peerage barons – Unlike in the Scottish Peerage division where the lowest rank of the peerage is Lord of Parliament with baron being a territorial rank of nobility. In Scotland, feudal baronies were abolished 2004, but with full continued legal recognition for the titles.

The Barony of the Bachuil is a unique Scottish barony in two regards: firstly, because it belongs to whoever is the legal possessor of a particular ancient stick, and secondly, because it is held "By the Grace of God" making its holder the only person other than the King entitled to this style. The title is in the possession of the Chief of Clan Livingstone. The Barony is therefore considered to be allodial.

==== Manorial lordship ====
The feudal title Lord of the manor continues to exist in England and Wales to this day, and the status of lord of the manor is associated with the rank of esquire by prescription. This is due to the fact that Lords of the Manor typically held feudal obligations to a greater baron who owned their feudal holding via knight service (an esquire being the attendant of a knight). Landed Lords of the Manor historically made up the majority of the gentry in England following their separation from the peerage in the 1600s.

Following the Norman conquest all Baronies in England were originally feudal. Under King Henry II, the Dialogus de Scaccario already distinguished between greater lords (who held their baronies per baroniam by knight-service), and lesser lords (who owned the manor without knight-service). As they held their title due to ownership of manors, and not per baroniam knights service, lords of the manor were in the 'lesser' group.

Under the Tenures Abolition Act 1660, many of the greater baronies (held by tenure) were converted into baronies by writ, joining the peerage. It is understood that all English Feudal Baronies that were not Lordships of the manor and had not been upgraded into a peerage, were therefore abolished by the Tenures Abolition Act 1660 passed after the Restoration, which took away knight-service and other legal rights. No English Feudal baronies therefore exist, though the Feudal Barony of Otford was allegedly successfully registered with HM Land Registry according to a sale in 2025. This left Lordships of the Manor as the sole title of the English feudal system, and as a legal estate in land carrying the rank of esquire by prescription.

A manorial lordship does not entitle the holder to use the title of 'Lord' before their name, and the title when used should always be stated as a full designation after the name of the holder, e.g. "[First name] [Surname], Lord of the Manor of [Placename]". Ownership can be noted on request in British passports through an official observation typically worded, 'The Holder is the Lord of the Manor of [place name]'.

Prior to the Tenures Abolition Act most manorial lords held feudal obligations to an overlord (or overlords) (a greater baron) who in turn ultimately held obligations to the King. However, a Lord Paramount was a manorial Lord who held their lands to no overlord excepting the King. A handful of these examples exist into the present era. The Marquess of Exeter continues to hold the title "Lord Paramount of the Soke of Peterborough". The title "Lord Paramount of the Seignory of Holderness" is held by the Constable family of Burton Constable Hall. Marcher Lordships also bore personal allegiance to the king as feudal subjects. A handful of manorial Marcher Lordships are still held – For instance, the feudal Marcher Lordship of Cemais is still held by the Hawkesworth family, and the "Lady Marcher of Cemaes" still holds a court leet and appoints the Mayor of Newport. Certain ancient estates preserve these historic styles such as “Lord Paramount”, “Marcher Lord” or “Lord of the Fells” etc. though these are now an honorary and ceremonial title associated with the manorial lordship and confer no further status or power.

==== Lairds ====
In Scotland, the approximate equivalent title to Lord of the manor is Laird. This rank is held only by those holding official recognition in a territorial designation by the Lord Lyon King of Arms. They are usually styled [name] [surname] of [lairdship]. The title of Laird cannot be acquired by purchasing a souvenir plot and Lord Lyon warns against the activities of companies purporting to confer it that way. Lairdships do not confer nobility in themselves if the Laird does not petition for a grant of arms, and the possession of such a title does not guarantee eligibility.

==== Seigneur ====
In the Channel Islands the equivalent to a Lord of the Manor is a Seigneur. The most notable Seigneur is that of Sark, who until recently enjoyed considerable legal privileges. Feudalism has retained a more prominent role in the Channel Islands than in the UK. The Channel Islands are remnants of the Duchy of Normandy and are held directly by the crown on a feudal basis as they are self-governing possessions of the British Crown. The 'Squirearchy' or seigneurial class has been paramount in the social hierarchy of Jersey and Guernsey for many centuries, and some of its members still participate annually in the Court of Chief Pleas in Guernsey and the Assize d'Heritage in Jersey. Seigneurs were (and are) commonly referred to by the names of their fiefs. Purchasing a Channel Island fief is possible for anyone, regardless of nationality or citizenship. However, this occurs infrequently, as fiefs tend to pass down within families.

=== Others ===
Descendants in the male line of peers and children of women who are peeresses in their own right, as well as of baronets, knights, dames, and of non-armigerous landowning families are typically considered members of the gentry informally but must apply for a grant of arms to join a formal nobility association. Their social status will typically make them eligible for a grant.

== Ennoblement ==
The Monarch grants Peerages, Baronetcies and Knighthoods to citizens of the United Kingdom and Commonwealth Realms at the advice of the Prime Minister. Honours lists are published regularly at important occasions. Hereditary titles have been seldom conferred on non-royals since 1965.

Untitled nobility, i.e. gentility, being identical to armigerousness, falls into the jurisdiction of the College of Arms and Lyon Court. Part of the Monarch's fons honorum—the power to grant arms—has been de facto devolved to Garter King of Arms and Lord Lyon King of Arms, respectively. A grant of arms is in every regard equivalent to a patent of nobility on the Continent; depending on jurisdiction and circumstances it can be seen as either an act of ennoblement or a confirmation of nobility.

Thus, along with Belgium and Spain, the United Kingdom remains one of the few countries in which nobility is still granted and the nobility (except for the hereditary peerage and baronetage) does not form a closed, purely "historical" class.

== Recognition of foreign titles ==
Though now independent, titles in commonwealth nations (who share a monarch with the United Kingdom) have traditionally been created in the Peerage of the United Kingdom and therefore form part of the British nobility. This has, on occasion, led to conflicts between governments.

Prior to 1932, British subjects who held foreign titles could apply for a licence to use and be recognised by that title, though the grant of such licences was inconsistent. However with the issuing of a Royal Warrant in 1932, the right of use of foreign titles by British subjects was abolished and no further applications for Royal Licences could be submitted for consideration. A handful of exceptions to the warrant existed for a few individuals who had received the grants prior to the warrant, but only for the lifetime of the grantees. Foreign titles are sometimes used socially in the United Kingdom, but this is a mere discretionary courtesy, and not evidence of formal recognition. British subjects who held foreign titles of nobility are de facto by their nature not members of the British nobility, but obviously could be said to have held formal recognition amongst their ranks.

The Baron de Longueuil is a unique example of a foreign title recognised by the British Crown. It was created in 1700 as a noble title (though not part of the Peerage of France) for Charles le Moyne de Longueuil, a Norman military officer. Its continuing recognition since the cession of Canada by France to Britain is based on the Treaty of Paris (1763), which reserved to those of French descent all rights which they had enjoyed before the cession. This is despite the fact that France is now a republic.

The monarch would also very occasionally grant personal styles for use in Britain to British subjects of recognised high ranking foreign nobility, for instance members of the Brooke dynasty—British subjects recognised first as holders of the title 'Rajah' by the Sultan of Brunei—were granted the personal style of Highness by King George V. This practice continues to this day in very limited circumstances, for example with the descendants of the Aga Khan, a British subject whose lineage descends from a Prince who served and was recognised under the British Raj. This was affirmed most recently in February 2025 when King Charles III granted the Aga Khan V the style 'His Highness'.

== Positions requiring nobility ==
There are a number of positions, such as ceremonial offices in government, in public organisations and membership in orders of chivalry, that require existing nobility. Usually, the requirement can be satisfied by obtaining a new grant.

- Sheriffs of the City of London must be armigerous. This requirement can be satisfied by a new grant. One must have been a Sheriff to become the ceremonial Lord Mayor of London.
- Knights of Justice of the Venerable Order of Saint John must be armigerous. This requirement can be satisfied by a new grant.
- Admission to the Order of the Garter also requires a right to arms. This requirement can be satisfied by a new grant.
- Knights of Grace and Devotion in the British Association of the Sovereign Military Order of Malta must demonstrate 100 years of gentility in the male line. For Knights of Honour and Devotion, either 300 years of gentility in the male line or four armigerous grandparents are required. Newer armigers and non-armigers are admitted as Knights of Magistral Grace. There have been cases in which sons of Scottish heraldic heiresses were admitted to the noble grades based on maternal descent from a sufficiently ancient family.

== History ==
=== Early English period ===
In the 5th century, Germanic peoples collectively known as Anglo-Saxons migrated to sub-Roman Britain and came to dominate the east and southeast of the island. Around half the population were free, independent farmers (Old English: ceorlas) who cultivated a hide of land (enough to provide for a family). Slaves, mostly native Britons, made up the other half. By the late 6th century, the archaeological evidence (grander burials and buildings) suggests the development of a social elite. The Late Antique Little Ice Age and the Plague of Justinian may have caused famine and other societal disruptions that compelled previously independent farmers to submit to the rule of strong lords. The Old English word for lord is hlaford ('loaf-guardian' or 'bread-giver').

The early law codes of Kent use the Old English word eorl ('high born', 'noble') to describe an aristocrat. By the 8th century, the word gesith ('companion'; Latin: comes) had replaced eorl as the common term for a nobleman.

By the 10th century, Anglo-Saxon society was divided into three main social classes: slaves, ceorlas ('free men'), and þegnas ('thegns', 'aristocrats'). Thegn (Old English: þeġn) meant servant or warrior, and it replaced the term gesith in the 10th century. In 1066, there were an estimated 5,000 thegns in England. Thegns were the backbone of local government and the military. Sheriffs were drawn from this class, and thegns were required to attend the shire court and give judgment. For these reasons, historian David Carpenter described thegns as "the country gentry of Anglo-Saxon England".

Thegns were divided into three ranks: ealdormen, king's thegns, and median thegns. The ealdorman was an official appointed by the king to administer a shire or group of shires (an ealdormanry). In the 11th century, while England was ruled by a Danish dynasty, the office changed from ealdorman to earl (related to Old English eorl and Scandinavian jarl). After the king, the earl was the most powerful secular magnate. During Edward the Confessor's reign (1042–1066), there were four principal earldoms: Wessex, Mercia, Northumbria, and East Anglia. Below ealdormen were king's thegns, so called because they only served the king. The lowest thegnly rank were the median thegns who owed service to other thegns.

High-ranking members of the church hierarchy (archbishops, bishops and abbots) paralleled the secular aristocracy. The church's power derived from its spiritual authority as well as its virtual monopoly on education. Secular government depended on educated clergy to function, and prelates were important politicians and royal advisers in the witan (the king's council).

=== Norman period (1066–1154) ===
The Norman Conquest of 1066 marked the creation of a new, French-speaking Anglo-Norman aristocracy with estates in both Normandy and England. This cross-Channel aristocracy also included smaller groups originating from other parts of France, such as Brittany, Boulogne, and Flanders.

When William I (r. 1066–1087) confiscated the property of the old Anglo-Saxon nobility, he kept 17 percent of the land as his royal demesne (now the Crown Estate). The rest was given to the Conqueror's companions and other followers. According to the Domesday Book of 1086, the rest of the land was distributed as follows:

- 50 percent went to greater tenants-in-chief
- 25 percent went to the church
- 8 percent went to minor royal officials and lesser tenants-in-chief

Land was distributed according to the rules of feudalism. Vassals were granted fiefs in return for military service and counsel. These vassals were called tenants-in-chief because they held land directly from the king. According to Domesday Book, there were 1,100 tenants-in-chief in 1086. Those with estates worth over £30 a year were considered the greater tenants-in-chief. Those with smaller estates were considered the lesser tenants-in-chief.

The greater tenants-in-chief constituted the highest ranks of the Anglo-Norman aristocracy: earls and the king's barons. The Normans continued to use the title of earl and equated it with the title of count (Latin: comes) used in Normandy. This was the only hereditary title before 1337, and it was the most exclusive rank within the aristocracy. Between 1000 and 1300, there were never more than 25 extant earldoms at any one time.

Below earls were the king's barons. Baron (Latin: baro) originally meant "man". In Norman England, the term came to refer to the king's greater tenants-in-chief. King's barons corresponded to king's thegns in the Anglo-Saxon hierarchy. Baron was not yet a hereditary title but rather described a social status.

The estate of an earl or baron was called an honour. Domesday Book identifies around 170 greater tenants-in-chief, and the ten wealthiest among them owned 25 percent of the land:

1. Robert of Mortain, the earl of Cornwall
2. Odo of Bayeux, the earl of Kent
3. William FitzOsbern, the earl of Hereford
4. Roger de Montgomery, the earl of Shrewsbury
5. William de Warenne, the earl of Surrey
6. Hugh d'Avranches, the earl of Chester
7. Eustace II, the count of Boulogne
8. Richard fitz Gilbert
9. Geoffrey of Coutances
10. Geoffrey de Mandeville

Domesday Book also records around 6,000 under-tenants. Earls and barons granted land to their own vassals in a process called subinfeudation. Their most important vassals were honorial barons, who were of lesser status than king's barons. They corresponded to the lesser thegn of Anglo-Saxon England. Honorial barons were given manors in return for service and had their own tenants. For this reason, they were intermediate or mesne lords. These could also be wealthy and powerful, with some eclipsing the lesser important king's barons.

The lower ranks of the aristocracy included the landless younger sons of important families and wealthier knights (men who held substantial land by knight-service). Poorer knights (whose knight's fees were small) were likely excluded from the aristocracy.

=== 13th century ===
By 1300, the knightly class or gentry numbered around 3,000 landholders. Half of these were dubbed knights, while the other half were styled esquire. The banneret was ranked below a baron but above a regular knight. There was overlap between this group and the "lesser barons". (Note: If there was no male heir, a barony was partitioned between female heiresses who might hold a half, quarter, or thirty-sixth of the barony. These lesser barons were closer in status to the knightly class.)

The baronage (including barons, earls, and high-ranking churchmen) had a duty as tenants-in-chief to provide the king with advice when summoned to great councils. In the 1200s, the great council evolved into Parliament, a representative body that increasingly asserted for itself the right to consent to taxation. Initially, participation in Parliament was still determined by one's status as a tenant-in-chief. Earls and greater barons received a writ of summons issued directly from the king, while lesser barons were summoned through the local sheriffs. In the reign of Edward I (1272–1307), the first hereditary barons were created by writ. Over time, baronies by writ became the main method of creating baronies, and baronies by tenure became obsolete.

=== 20th century ===
Non-hereditary positions began to be created again in 1867 for Law Lords. In 1958, the Life Peerages Act 1958 enabled (non-hereditary) life peers to sit in the House of Lords, and from then on the creation of hereditary peerages rapidly became obsolete, almost ceasing after 1964, Until in 2026 when Hereditary membership could be removed from them if they were suffering from a mental illness, or lacking mental capacity. The birthright seat was also abolished, leading to new ways into which the government would travel, after removing hereditary peers.

Until constitutional reforms soon after Tony Blair came to power (the House of Lords Act 1999), possession of a title in the peerage (except Irish) entitled its holder to a seat in the House of Lords. Since then, only 92 hereditary peers are entitled to sit in the House of Lords, of which 90 are elected by the hereditary peers by ballot and replaced on death. The two exceptions are the Earl Marshal (a position held by the Dukes of Norfolk), who is responsible for certain ceremonial functions on state occasions, and the Lord Great Chamberlain (a position held in gross and one of a number of persons can hold it), who serves as the monarch's representative in Parliament and accompanies them on certain state occasions; both are automatically entitled to sit in the House. Typically, those due to inherit a peerage—or indeed have done so, in recent times—have been educated at one of the major public schools, such as Eton, Radley, Oundle, Winchester or Harrow.

A member of the House of Lords cannot simultaneously be a member of the House of Commons. In 1960, Anthony Wedgwood Benn inherited his father's title as Viscount Stansgate. He fought and won the ensuing by-election, but was disqualified from taking his seat until the Peerage Act 1963 was passed enabling hereditary peers to renounce their titles. Titles, while often considered central to the upper class, are not always strictly so. Both Captain Mark Phillips and Vice-Admiral Sir Timothy Laurence, the respective first and second husbands of Princess Anne, do not hold peerages. Most members of the British upper class are untitled.

== Territorial designations ==
The term "territorial designation" can have one of two meanings, either referring to the name (or part of the name) of a British title, or to a portion of the surname recognised in Scotland.

=== Peerages and baronetcies ===
The name adopted by the grantee of a title of nobility originally was the name of his seat or principal manor, which often had also been adopted as his surname, for example the Berkeley family seated at Berkeley Castle had the surname "de Berkeley" ("from Berkeley") and gained the title Baron Berkeley, amongst many others. Dukes were originally named after counties, the earliest one being Duke of Cornwall (1337) followed by Duke of Norfolk (1483) and Duke of Somerset (1547). The Duke of Wellington (1814) is an early example of a dukedom being named after a mere village, or manor, after Wellington in Somerset.

Earls, being in reality the "Count" of Continental Europe, were also named after the County over which they exercised control. The range of names adopted for titles gradually expanded from territorial names alone. Later titles used a wide variety of names, including surname (unrelated to territorial designation indicated by the French particule de), for example in 1547 Richard Rich, 1st Baron Rich. Edward Russell in 1697 was created Viscount Barfleur after a naval victory in foreign territory, setting a precedent which has been repeatedly followed. Later earldoms also adopted family names, and omitted the preposition "of", an early example being Earl Rivers created in 1466 for Richard Woodville, 1st Baron Rivers. The title was not derived from the name of a place, but from the family name de Redvers, or Reviers, Earls of Devon. Earl Ferrers was created in 1711 for Robert Shirley, 14th Baron Ferrers, whose earlier title was named after the de Ferrers family, or Norman origin. Another early example of a surname being used as a title is Earl Poulett (1706).

Modern life peers do not generally own large estates, from which to name their title, so more imagination is required, unless the simple option of using the surname is selected.

=== In Scotland ===
In Scotland, landowners may style themselves with a territorial designation, becoming "Firstname Lastname of Estatename", if recognised as such by Lord Lyon. To qualify, an estate must be located "outwith a burgh" (i.e. outside a city) and furthermore be of a certain size, as well as have a name (which becomes the territorial designation). Once recognised, the territorial designation becomes a part of the surname. It is heritable by primogeniture under male preference, just like most old Scottish dignities in absence of a different disposition by the holder; all daughters but only the eldest son may use it by courtesy. If a family holds on to an estate for three generations, its territorial designation will continue to be inherited even if the estate is sold.

Many heads of ancient Scottish families, including some peers, clan chiefs and barons, prefer to be known by their territorial designation.

== Irish and Gaelic nobility ==
Outside the United Kingdom, the remaining Gaelic nobility of Ireland continue informally to use their provincial titles, few are recognised as royal extraction by the British Royal Family such as O'Donovan family. As Ireland was nominally under the overlordship of the English Crown for between the 12th and 16th centuries, the Gaelic system coexisted with the British system. A modern survivor of this coexistence is the Baron Inchiquin, still referred to in Ireland as the Prince of Thomond. The Prince of Thomond is one of three remaining claimants to the non-existent, since the 12th century, High Kingship of Ireland, the others being The O'Neill and the O'Conor Don.

Chief of the Name was a clan designation which was effectively terminated in 1601 with the collapse of the Gaelic order, and which, through the policy of surrender and regrant, eliminated the role of a chief in a clan or sept structure. This does not mean there is no longer a Chief or a sept today. Contemporary individuals today designated or claiming a title of an Irish chief treat their title as hereditary, whereas chiefs in the Gaelic order were nominated and elected by a vote of their kinsmen. Modern "chiefs" of tribal septs descend from provincial and regional kings with pedigrees beginning in Late Antiquity, whereas Scottish chiefly lines arose well after the formation of the Kingdom of Scotland, (with the exception of the Clann Somhairle, or Clan Donald and Clan MacDougall, the two of royal origins). The related Irish Mór ("Great") is sometimes used by the dominant branches of the larger Irish dynasties to declare their status as the leading princes of the blood, e.g.MacCarthy Mor dynasty, lit. (The) Great Macarthy or Ó Néill Mór, lit. (The) Great O'Neill.

Following the Norman invasion of Ireland several Hiberno-Norman families adopted Gaelic customs, the most prominent being the De Burgh dynasty and FitzGerald dynasty; their use of Gaelic customs did not extend to their titles of nobility, as they continuously utilized titles granted under the authority of the English monarchy.

== Jewish nobility ==
Among British peers of Jewish origin, Rufus Isaacs was the first to reach the rank of marquess (Marquess of Reading, created 1926). Others include Viscount Bearsted (Marcus Samuel, created 1925), Viscount Samuel (Herbert Samuel, 1937), Baron Melchett (Alfred Mond), Baron Swaythling (Montagu Samuel), and others. Jewish baronetcies also existed (e.g. Goldsmid), and Jewish arms and heraldry were sometimes adapted to reflect Jewish identity.

== Black British nobility ==
Both the marquessate of Bath (created in 1789) and the dukedom of Sussex (created in 2018) currently have heirs apparent that are of partial Black African origin; John Thynn, Viscount Weymouth is the elder son of Emma Thynn, Marchioness of Bath, while Prince Archie of Sussex is the elder child of Meghan Markle, Duchess of Sussex.

Other aristocratic British people of colour include the gentlewoman Dido Elizabeth Belle, the landowner Nathaniel Wells, the writer James Forman Jr. and the models Adwoa and Kesewa Aboah.

== Gallery ==
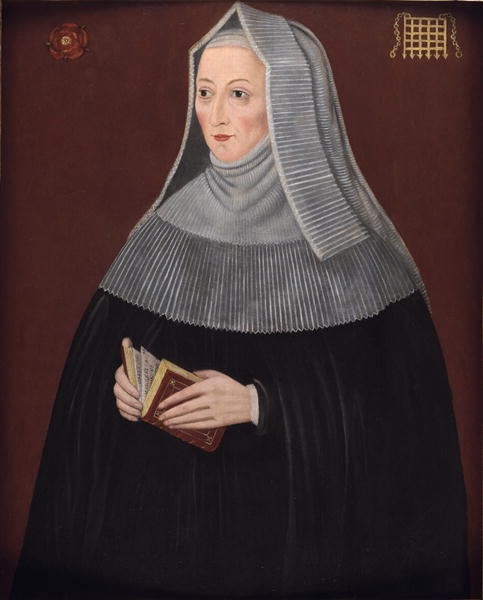
Lady Margaret Beaufort

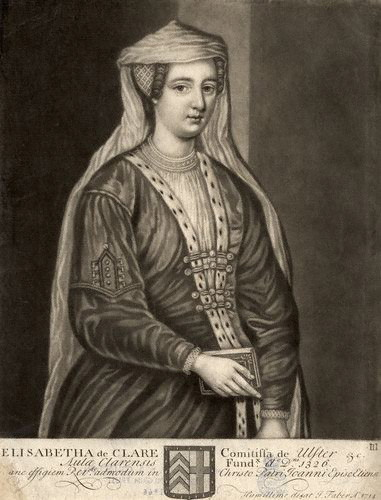
Elizabeth de Clare

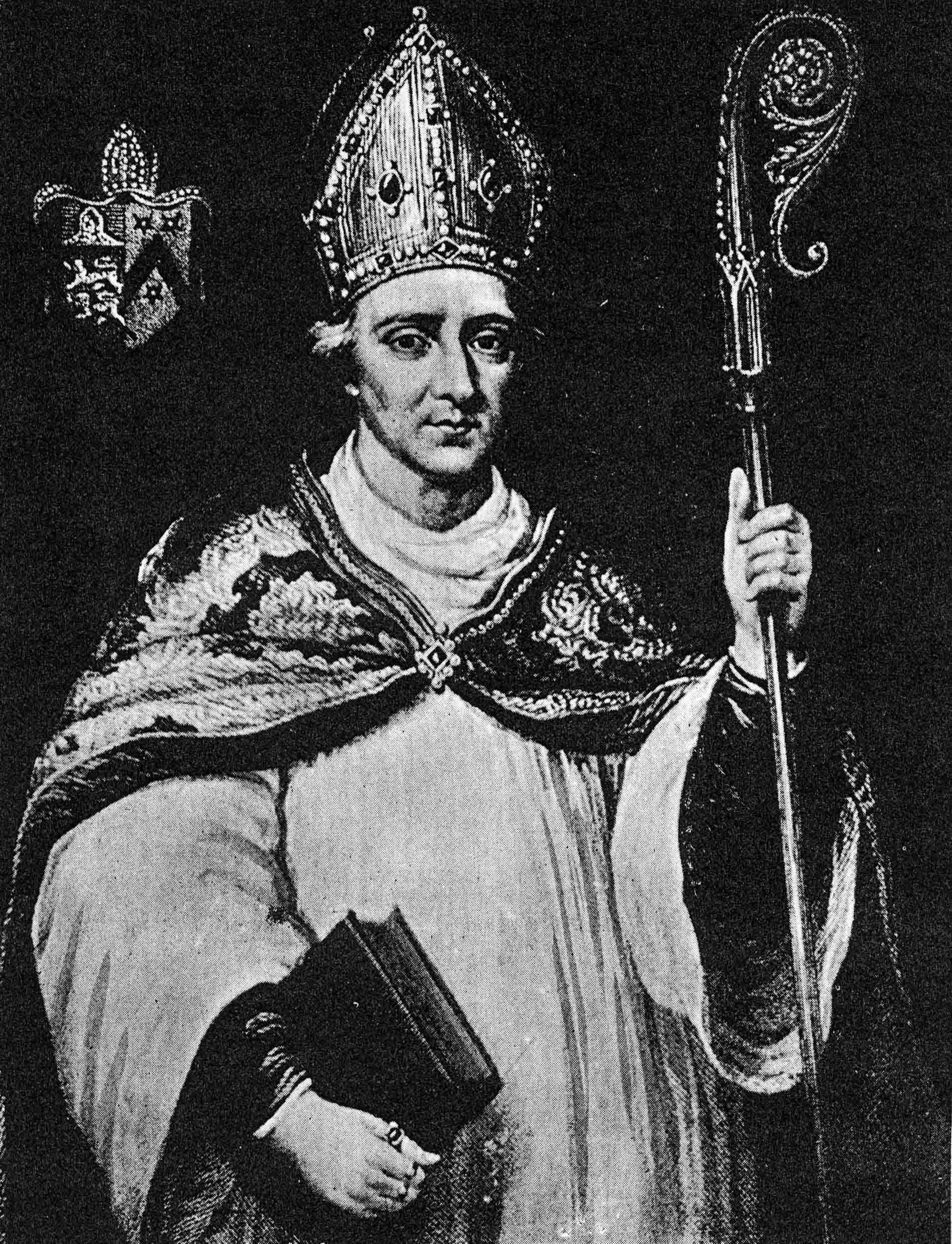
The Lord Bishop William Smyth

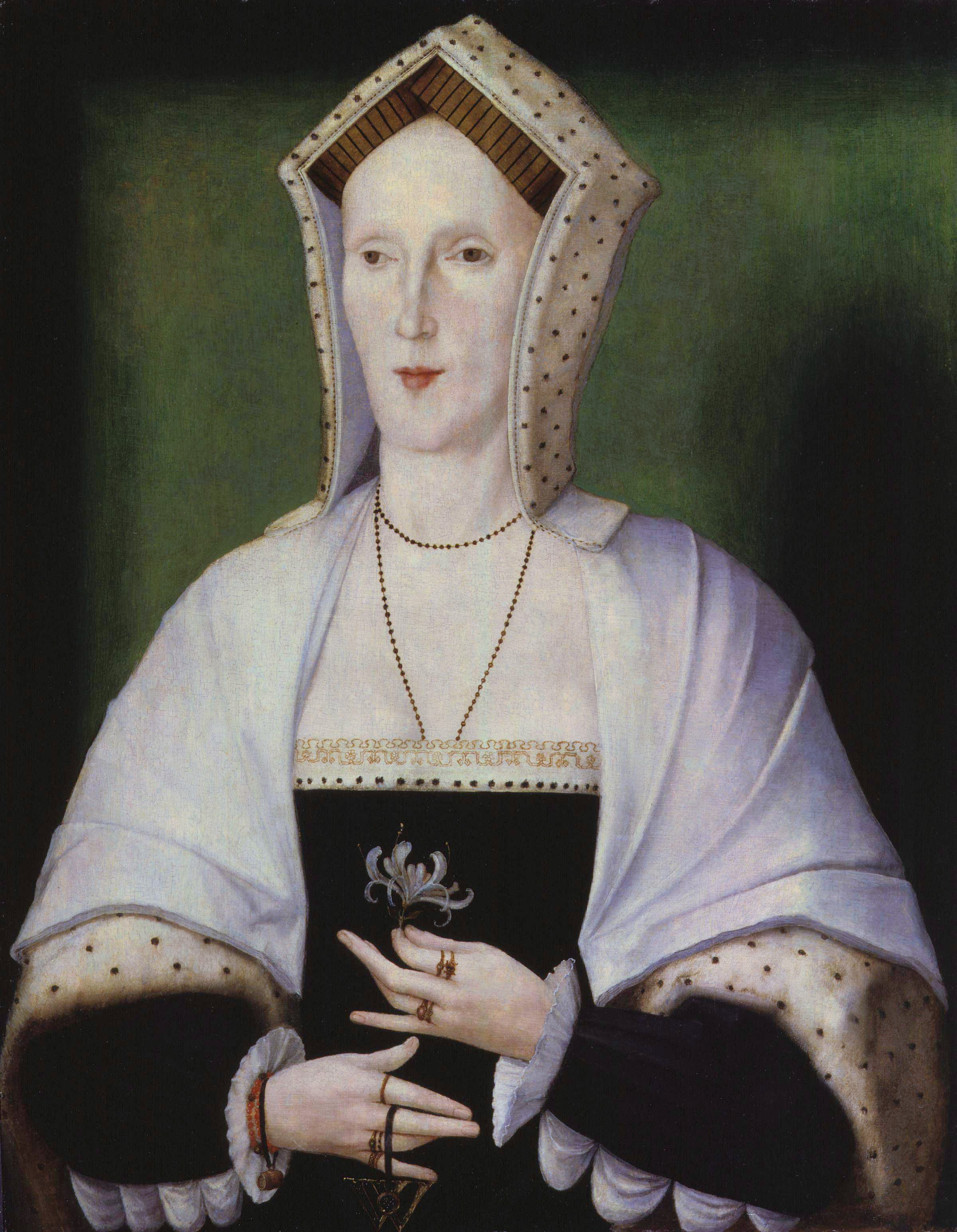
Margaret, Countess of Salisbury

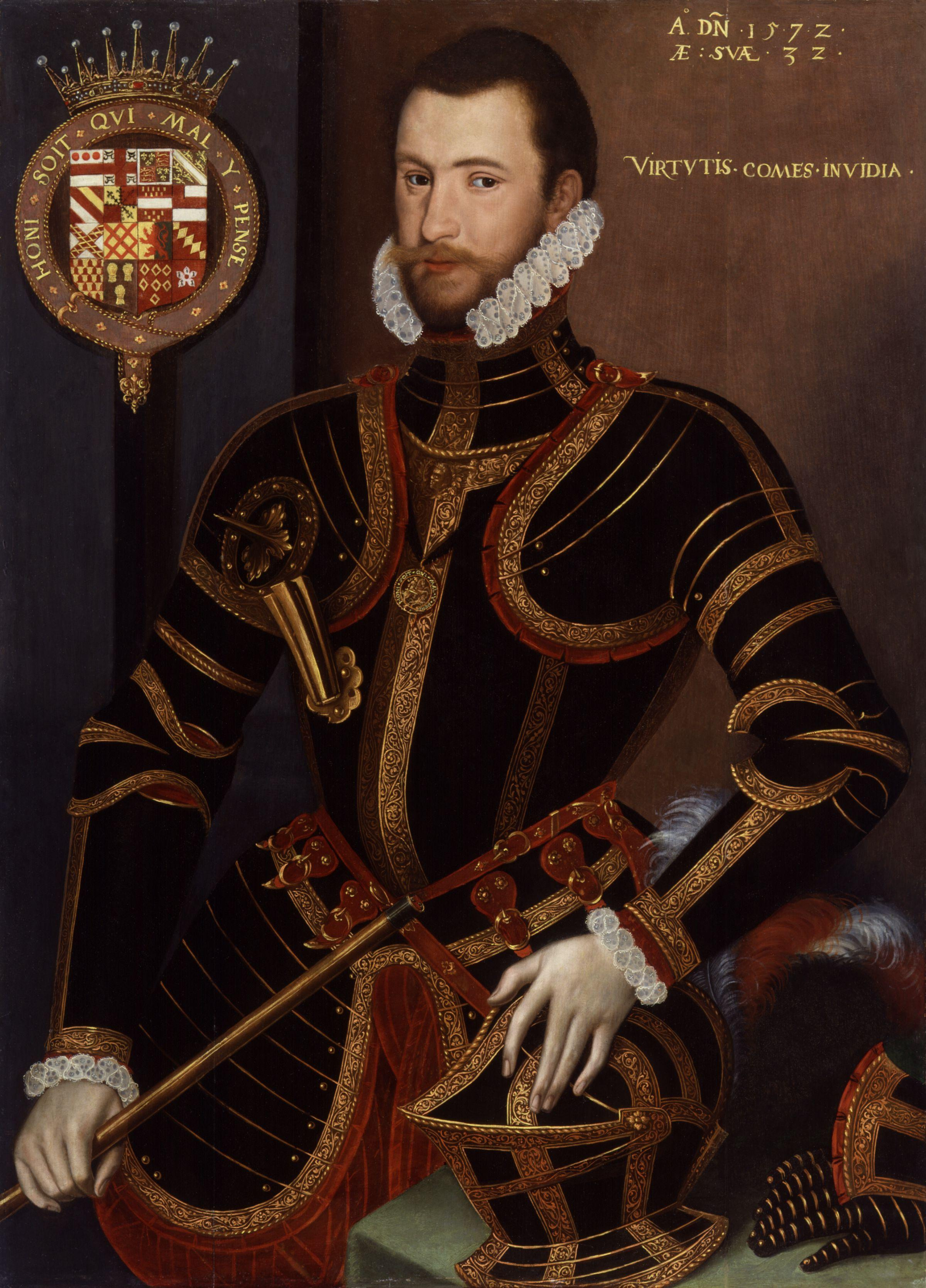
Walter, 1st Earl of Essex

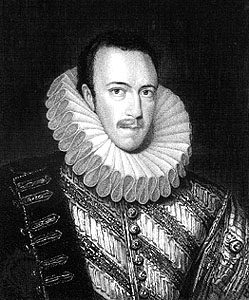
Philip, 20th Earl of Arundel

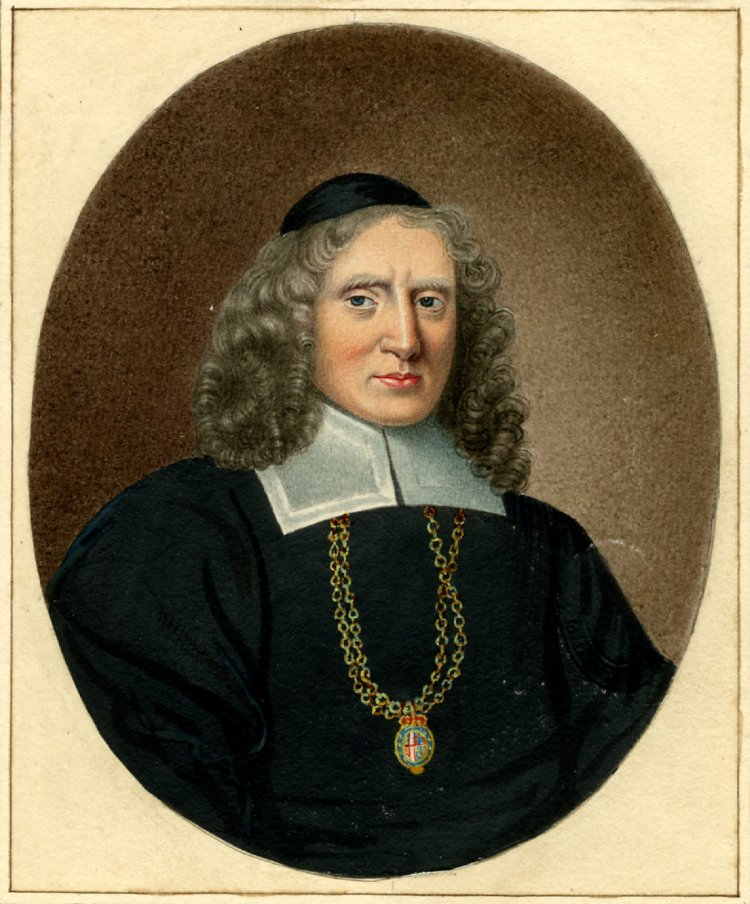
Sir William Dugdale

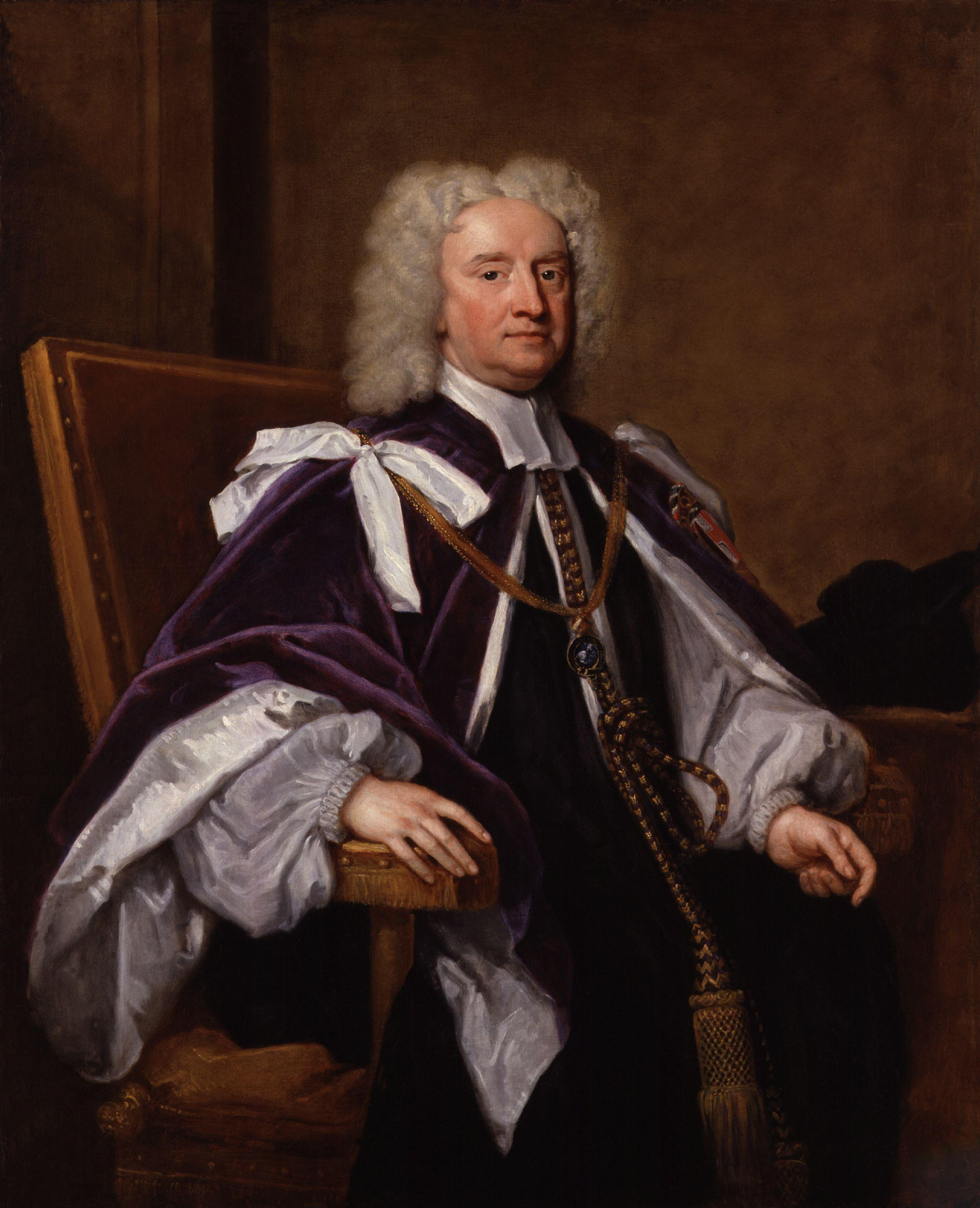
The Lord Bishop Jonathan Trelawny

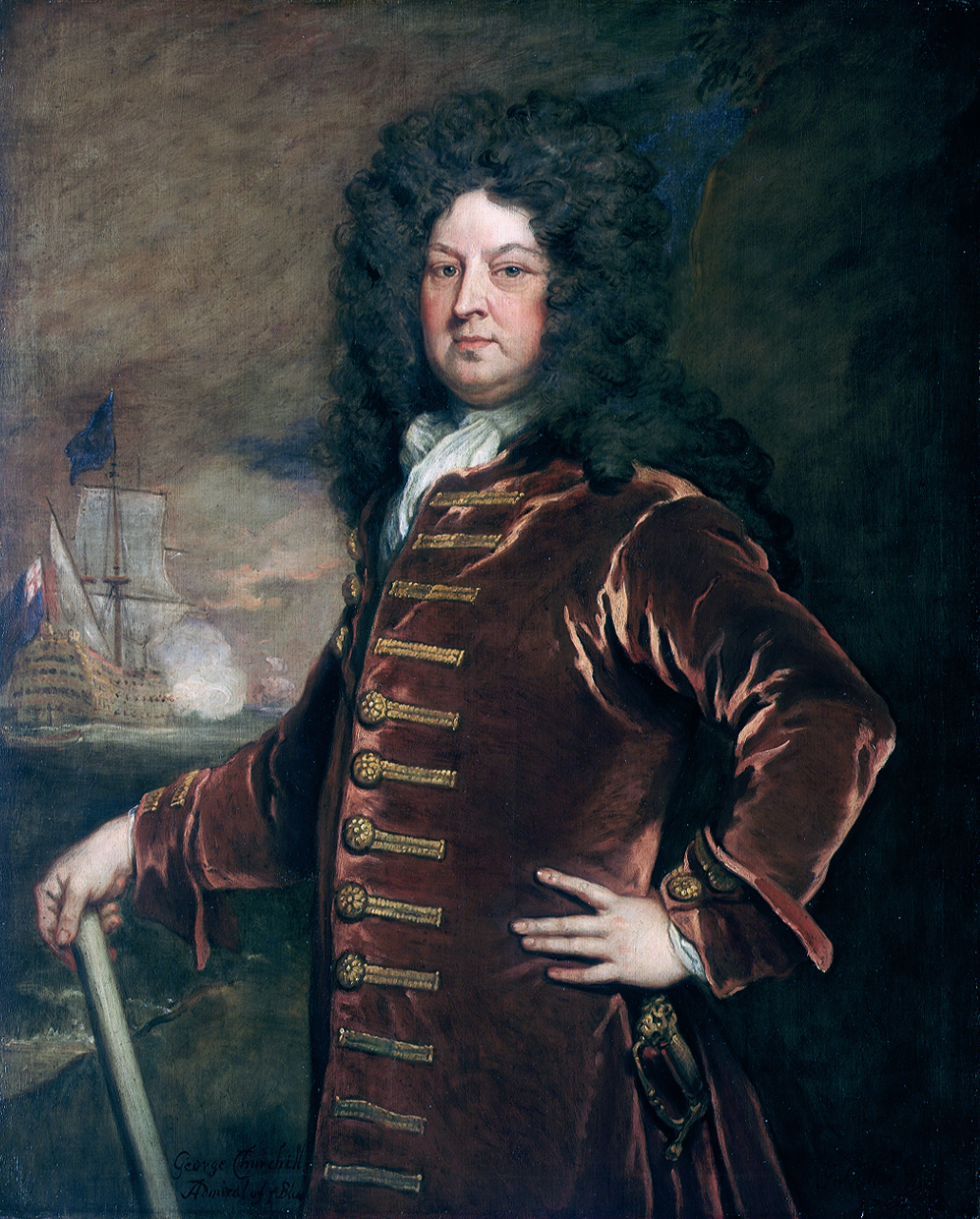
Admiral George Churchill

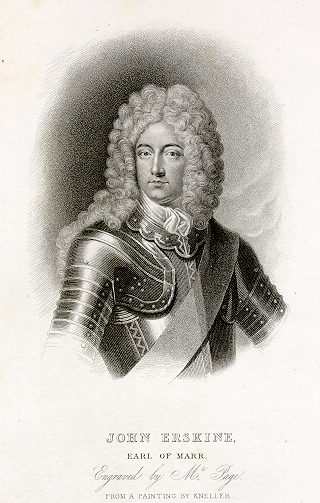
John, Earl of Mar

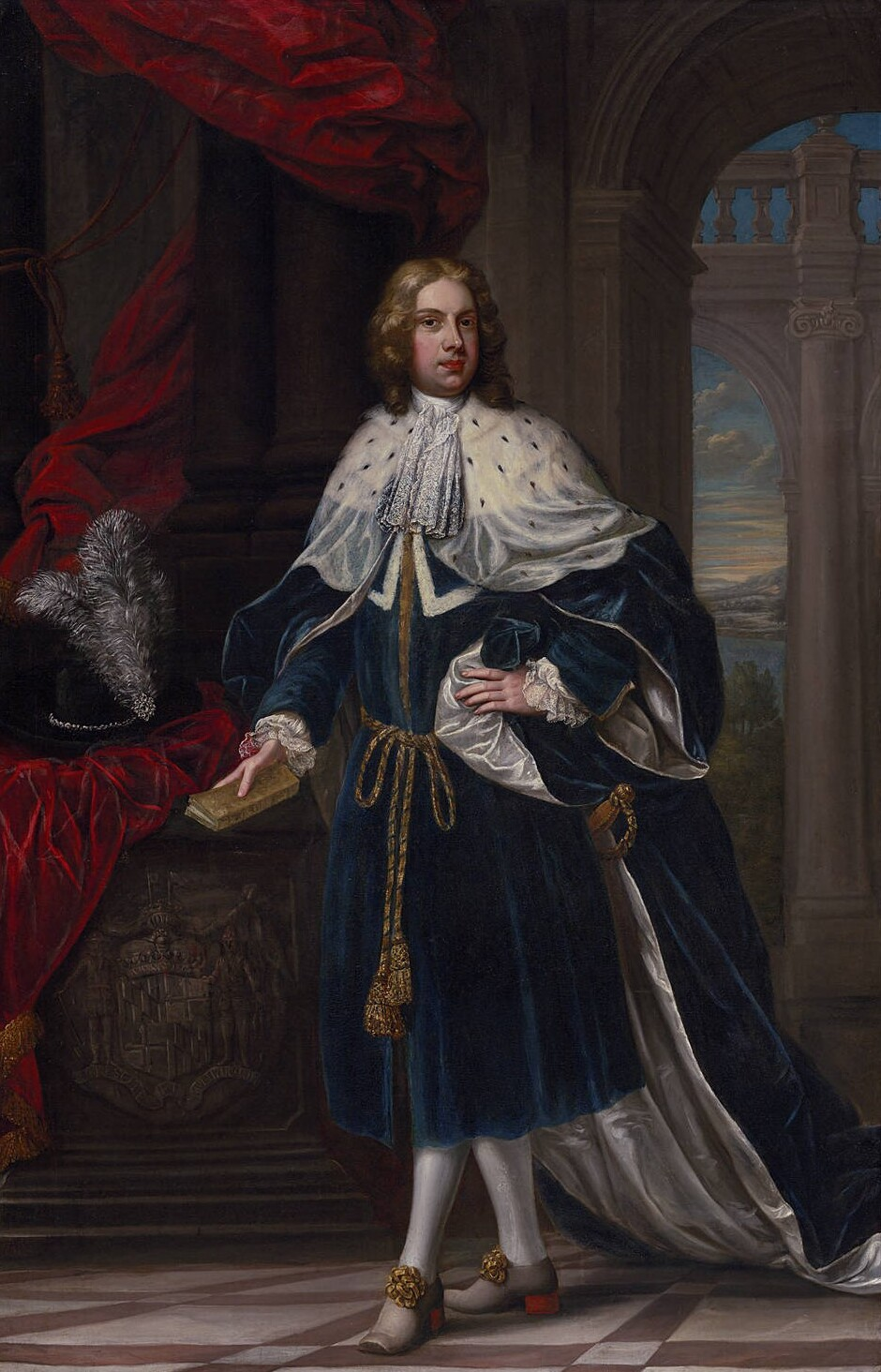
Benedict Calvert, 4th Baron Baltimore

Thomas Forster Esq.

The Reverend Nicolas Tindal

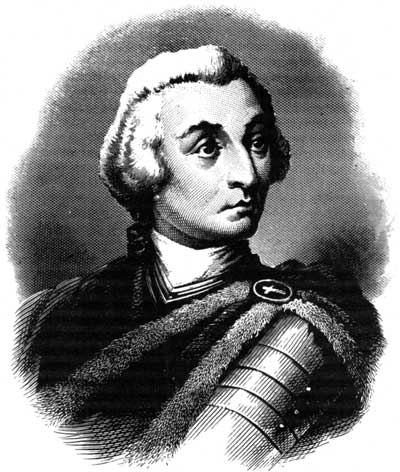
James Oglethorpe

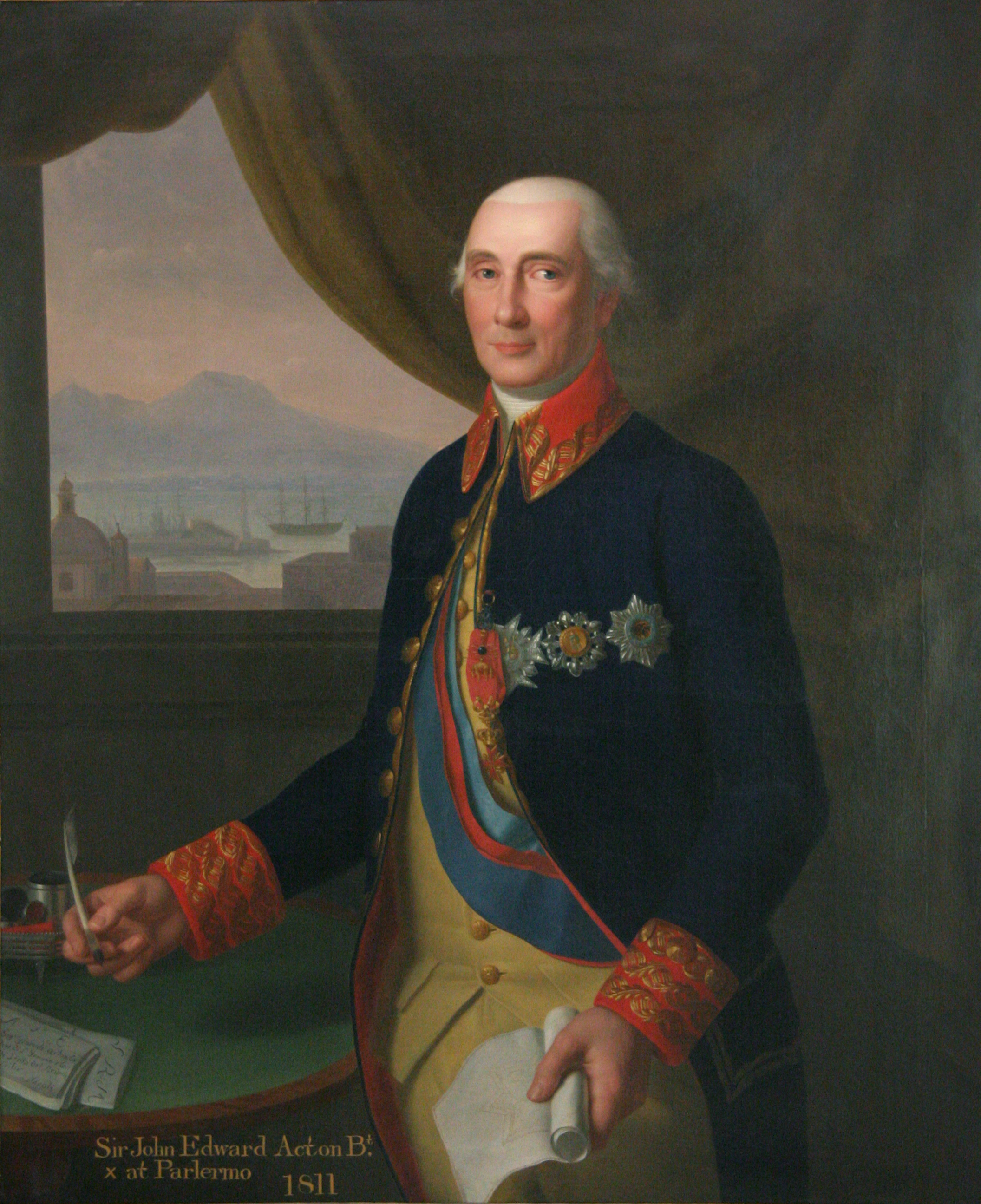
Sir John Acton, 6th Bt

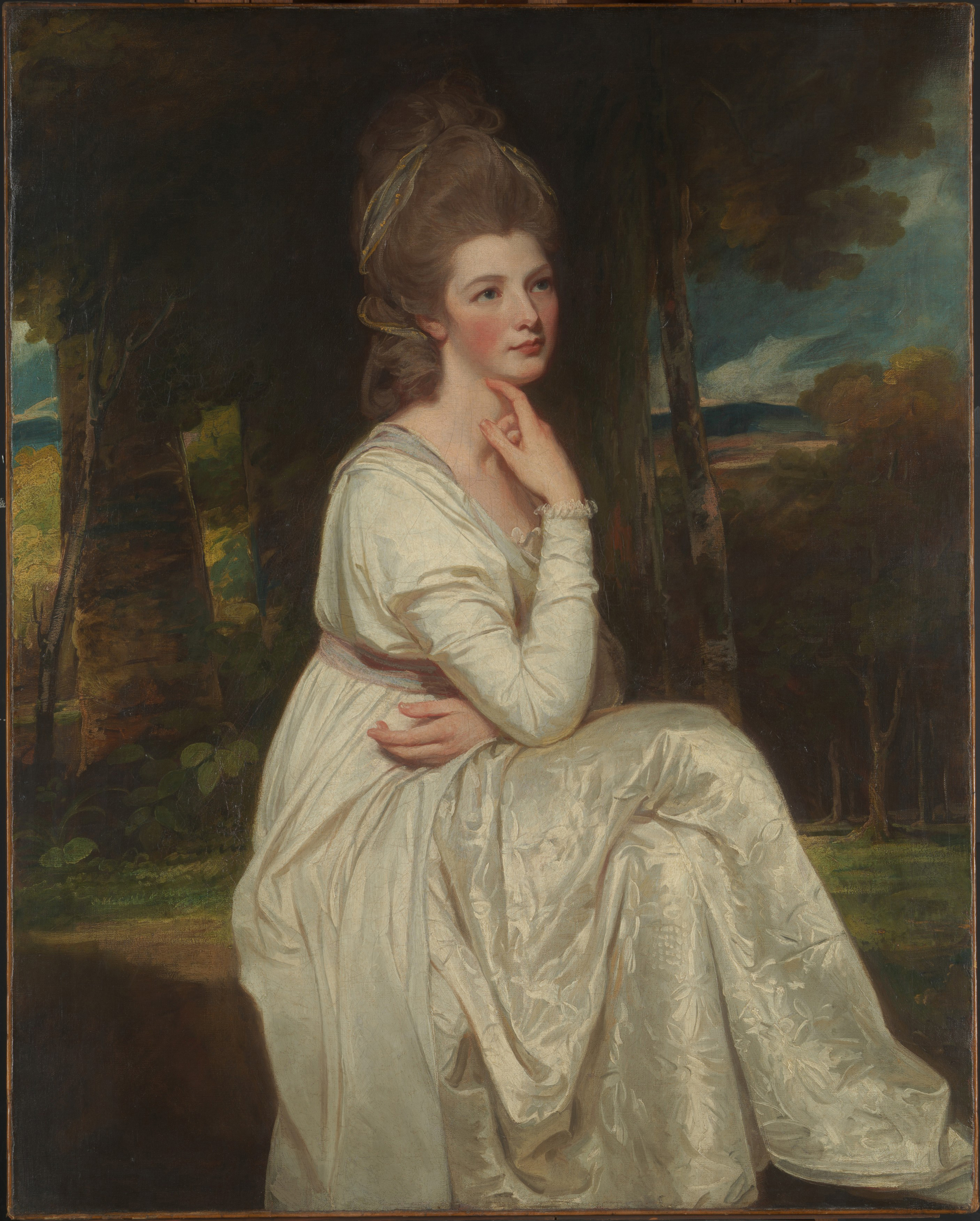
Elizabeth, Countess of Derby

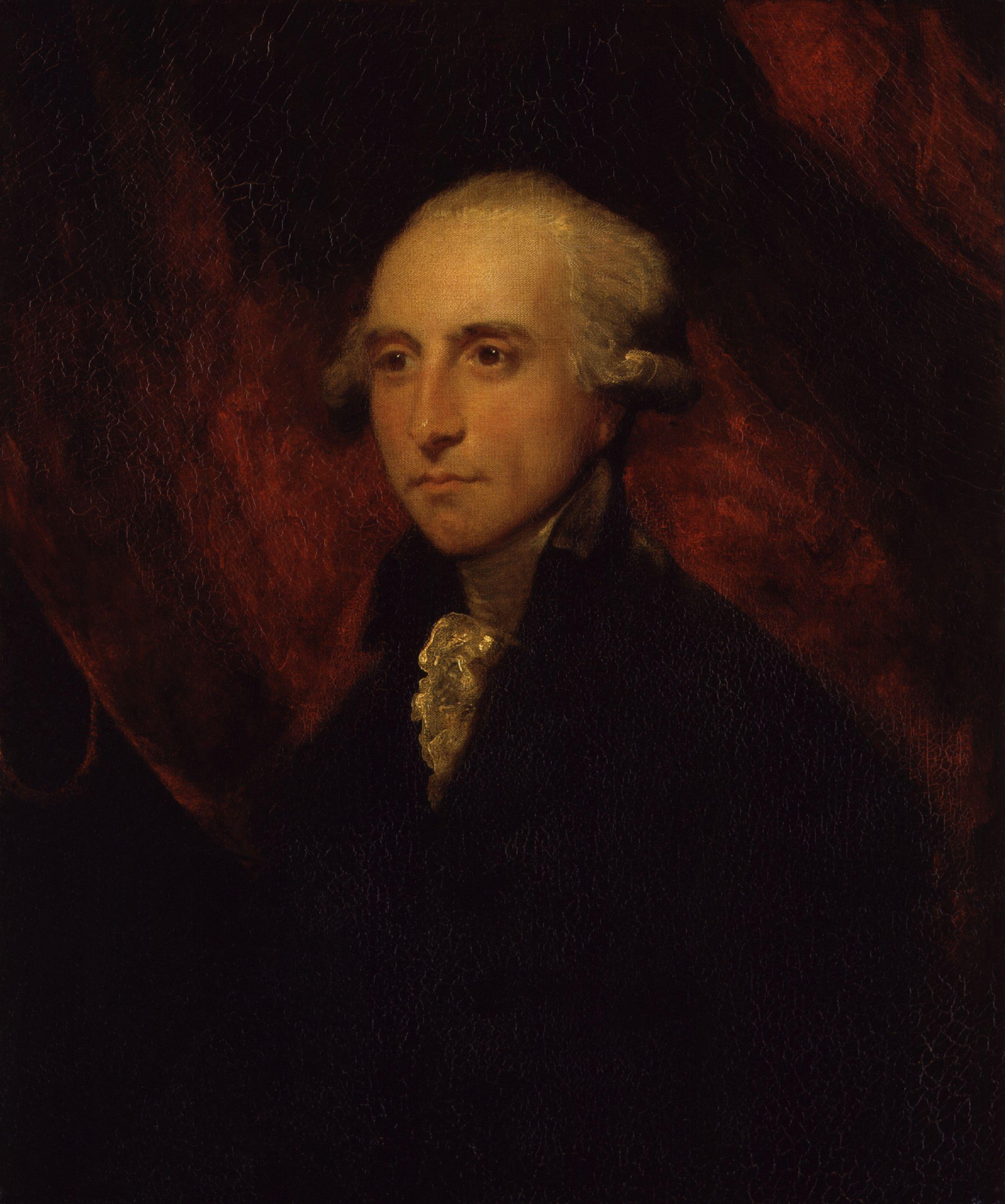
The Rt Hon William Windham

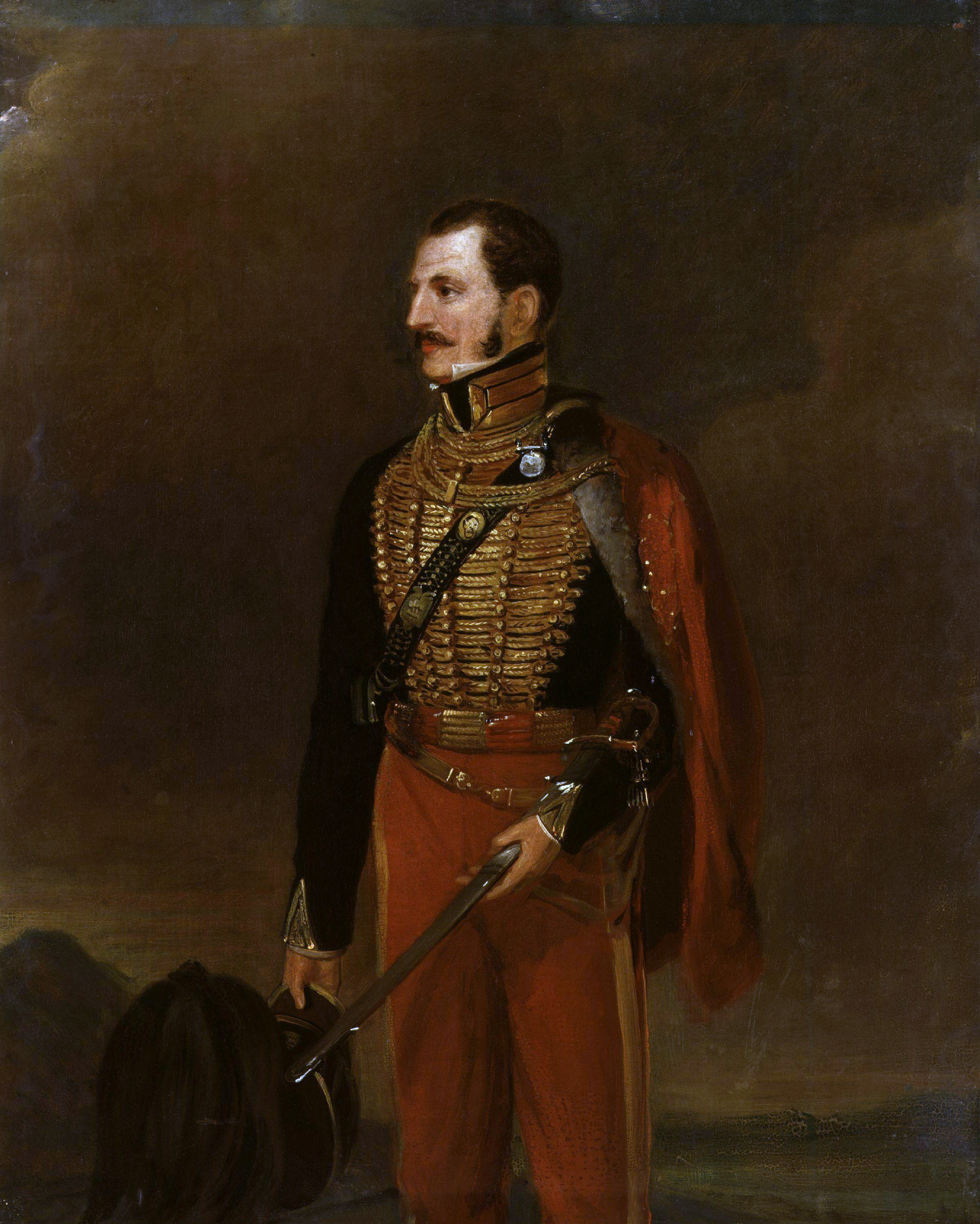
Lord Robert Manners

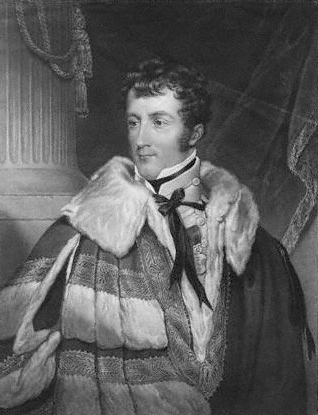
Charles, 5th Duke of Richmond

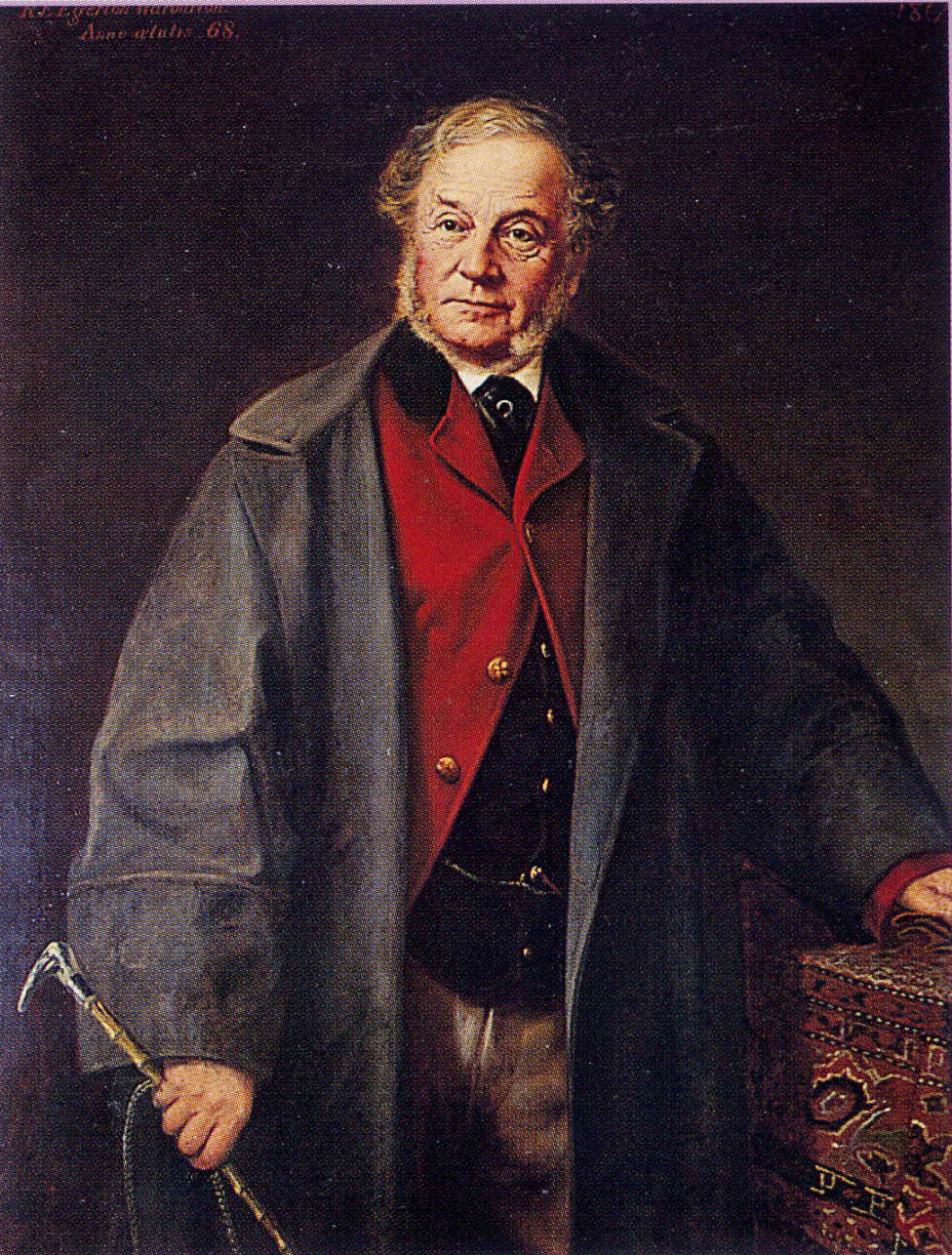
Rowland Egerton-Warburton

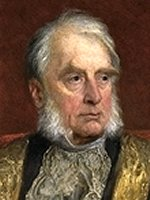
William, 7th Duke of Devonshire

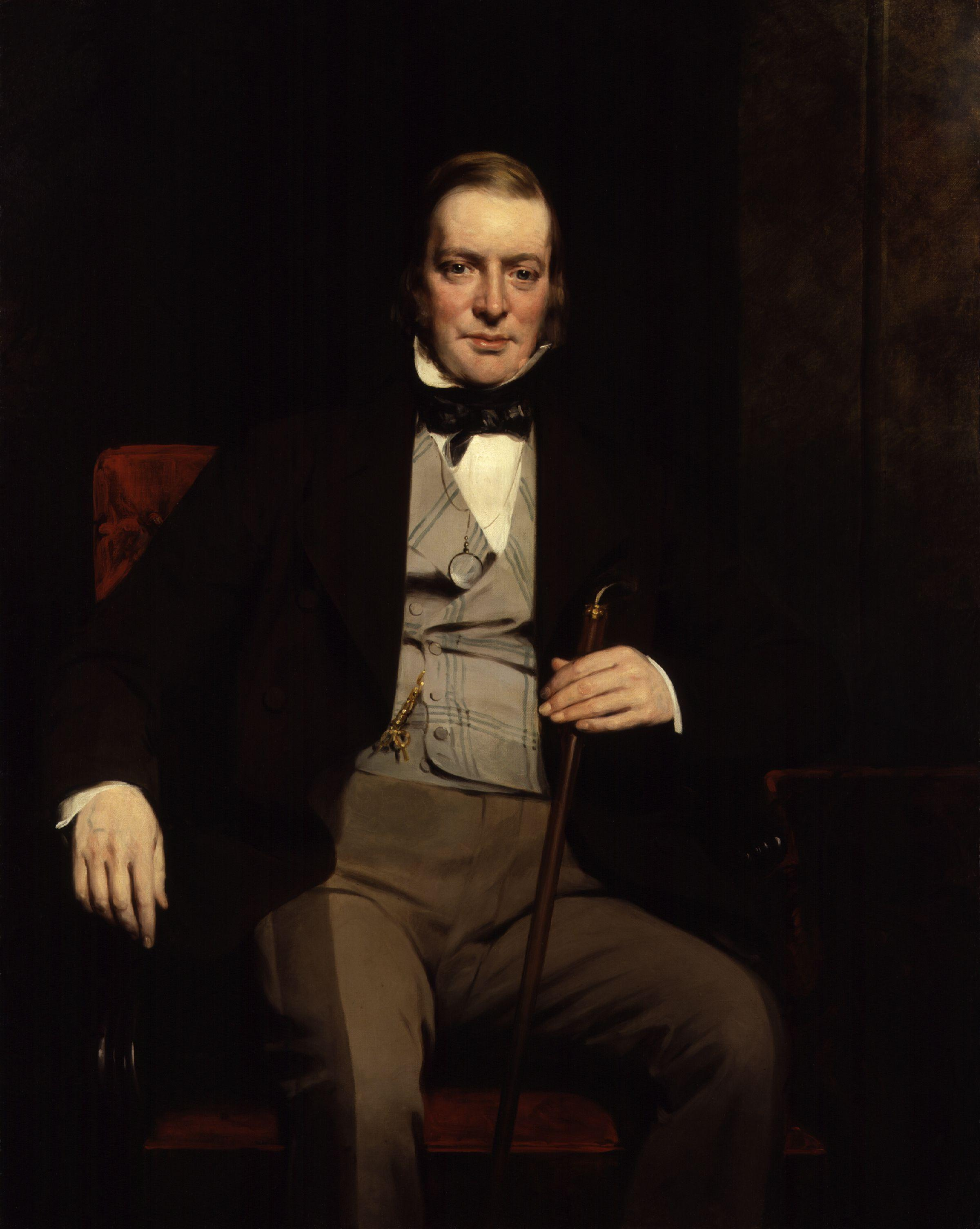
Sir William Molesworth, 8th Bt

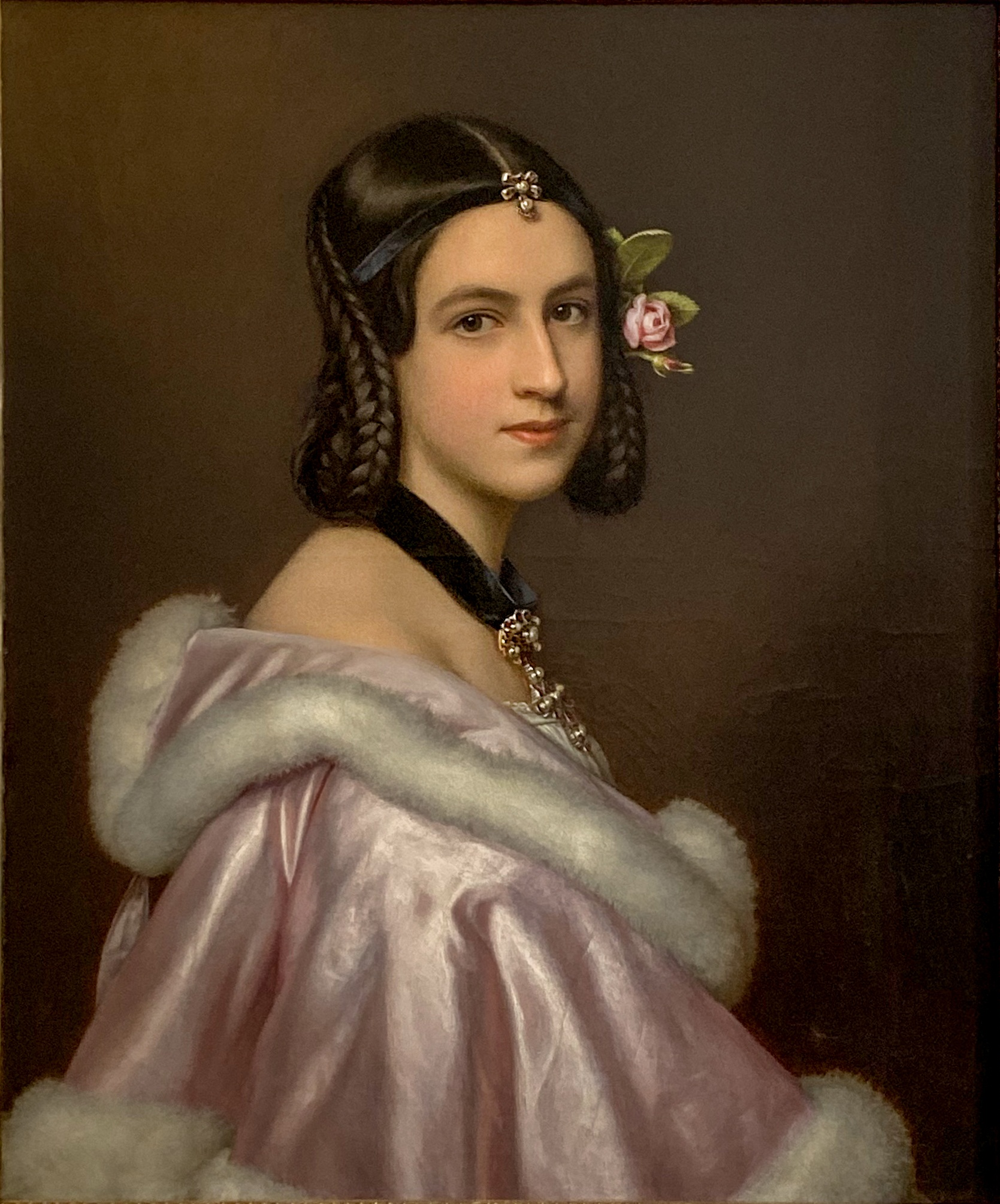
The Hon Jane Plumer Erskine

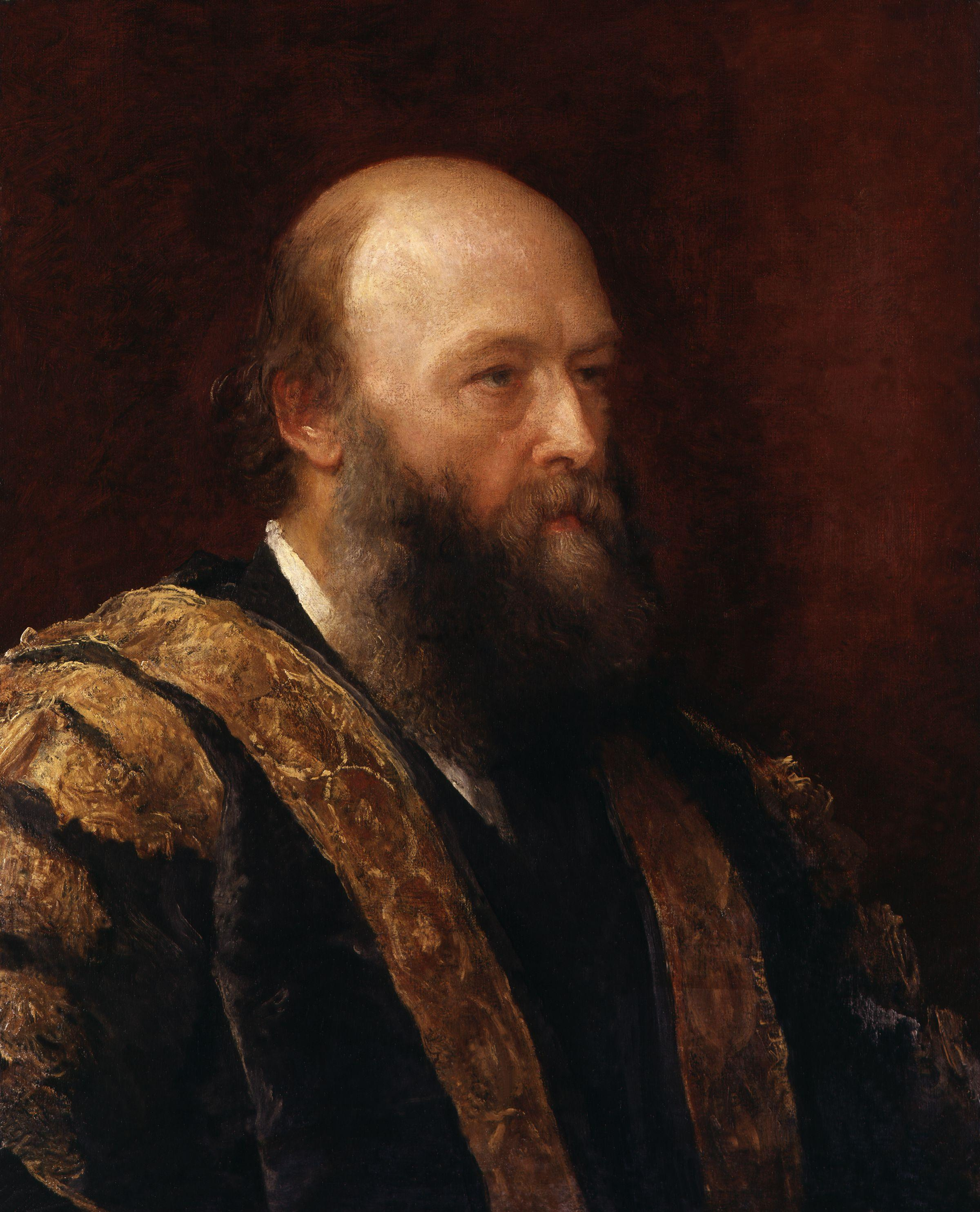
Robert, 3rd Marquess of Salisbury

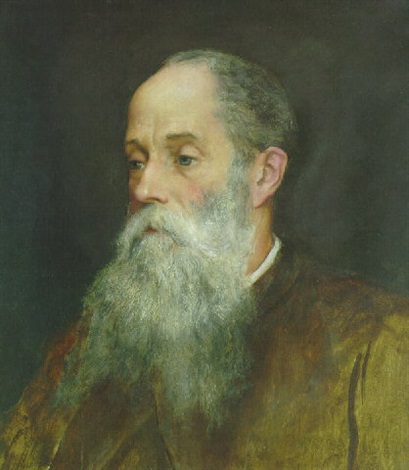
John Roddam Spencer Stanhope

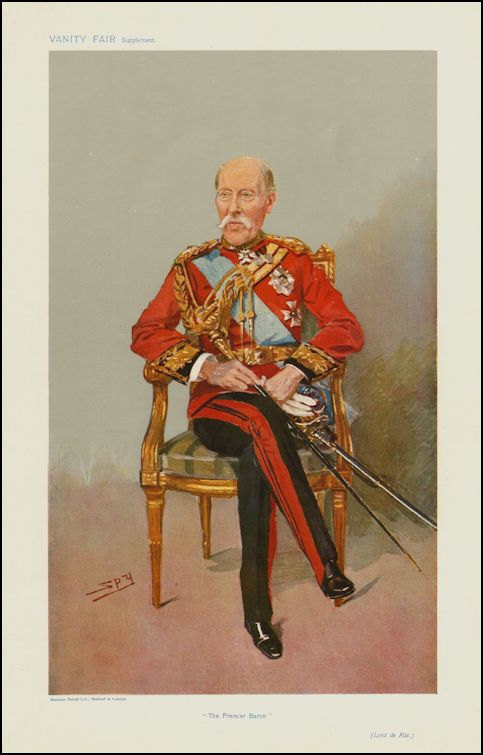
Dudley, 24th Baron de Ros

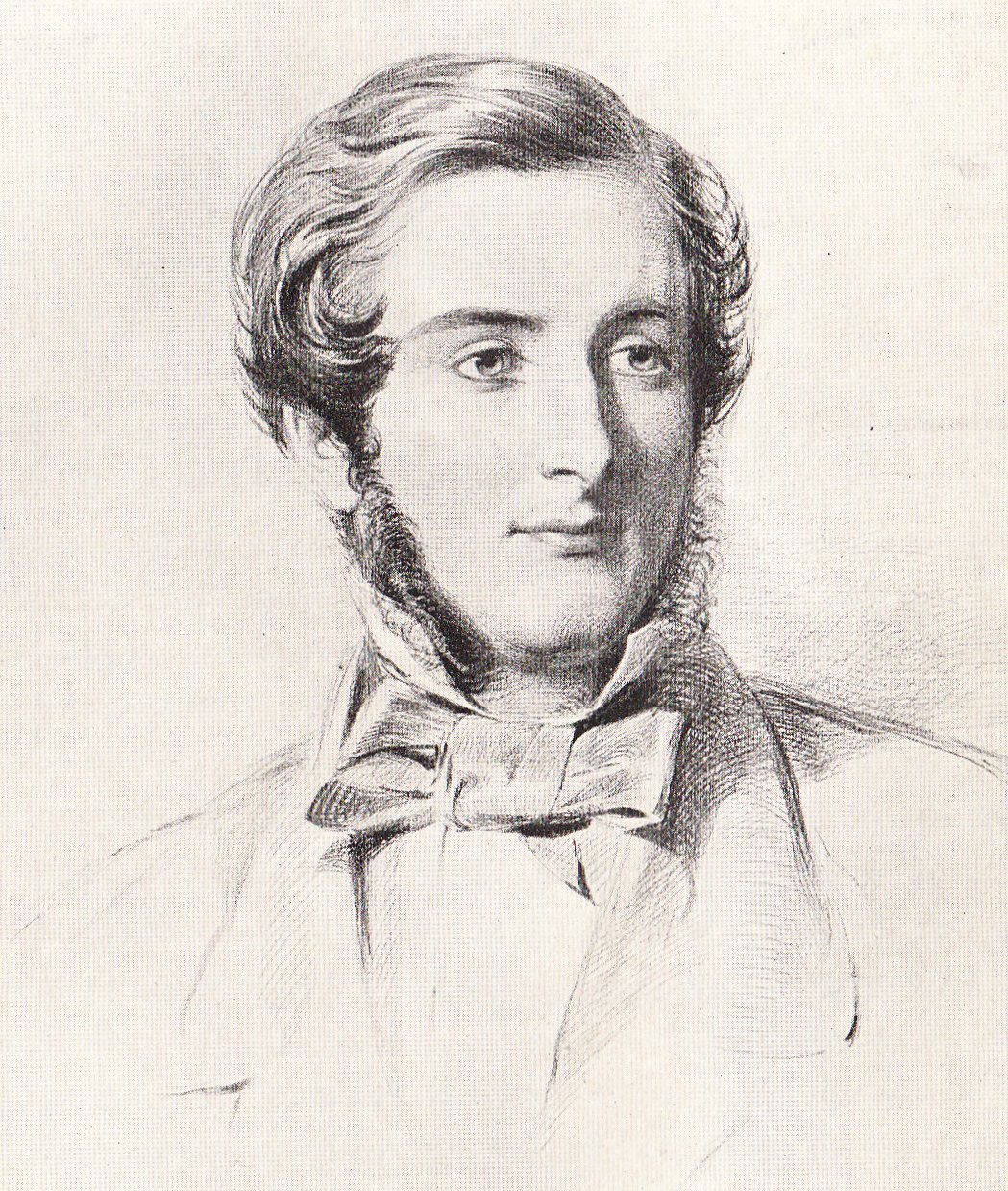
Sir Clements Markham

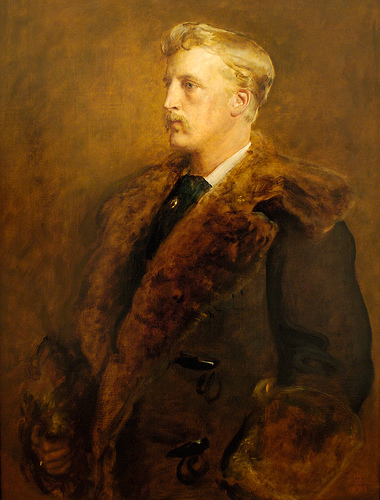
John, 9th Duke of Argyll

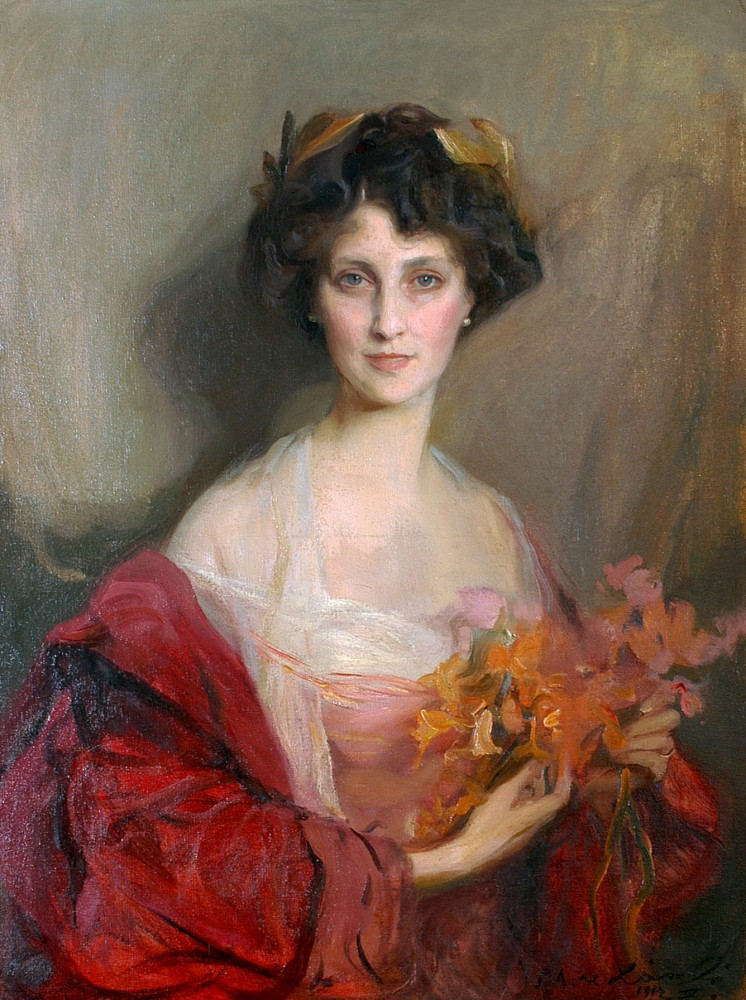
Winifred, Duchess of Portland

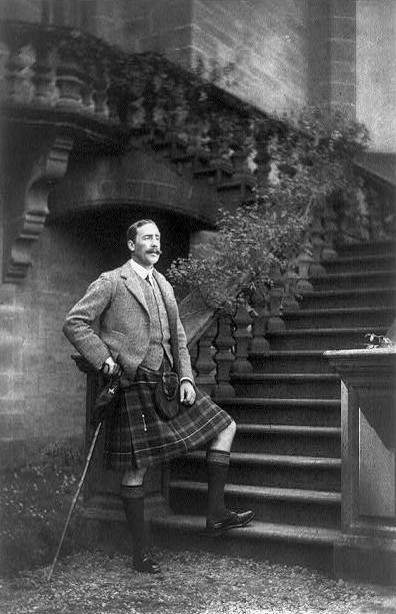
Simon, 14th Lord Lovat

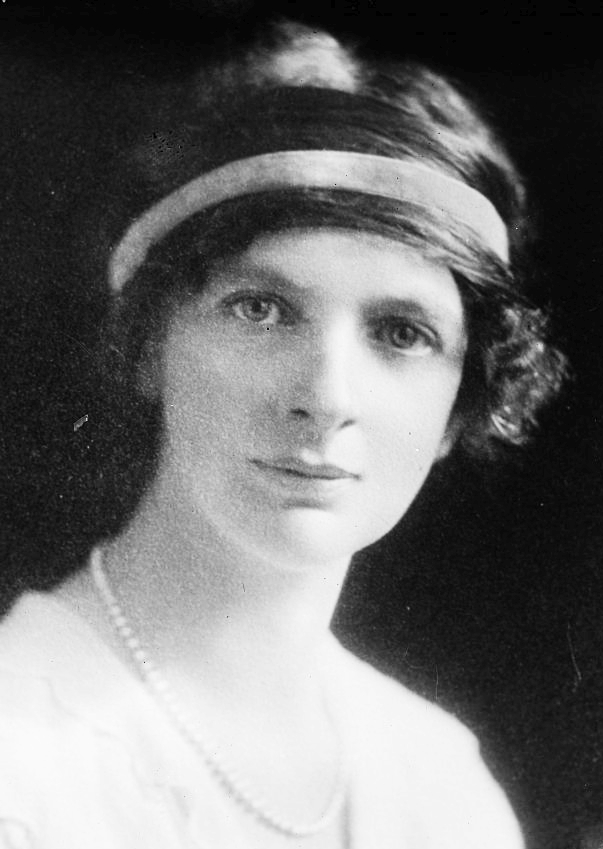
Lady Margaret Sackville

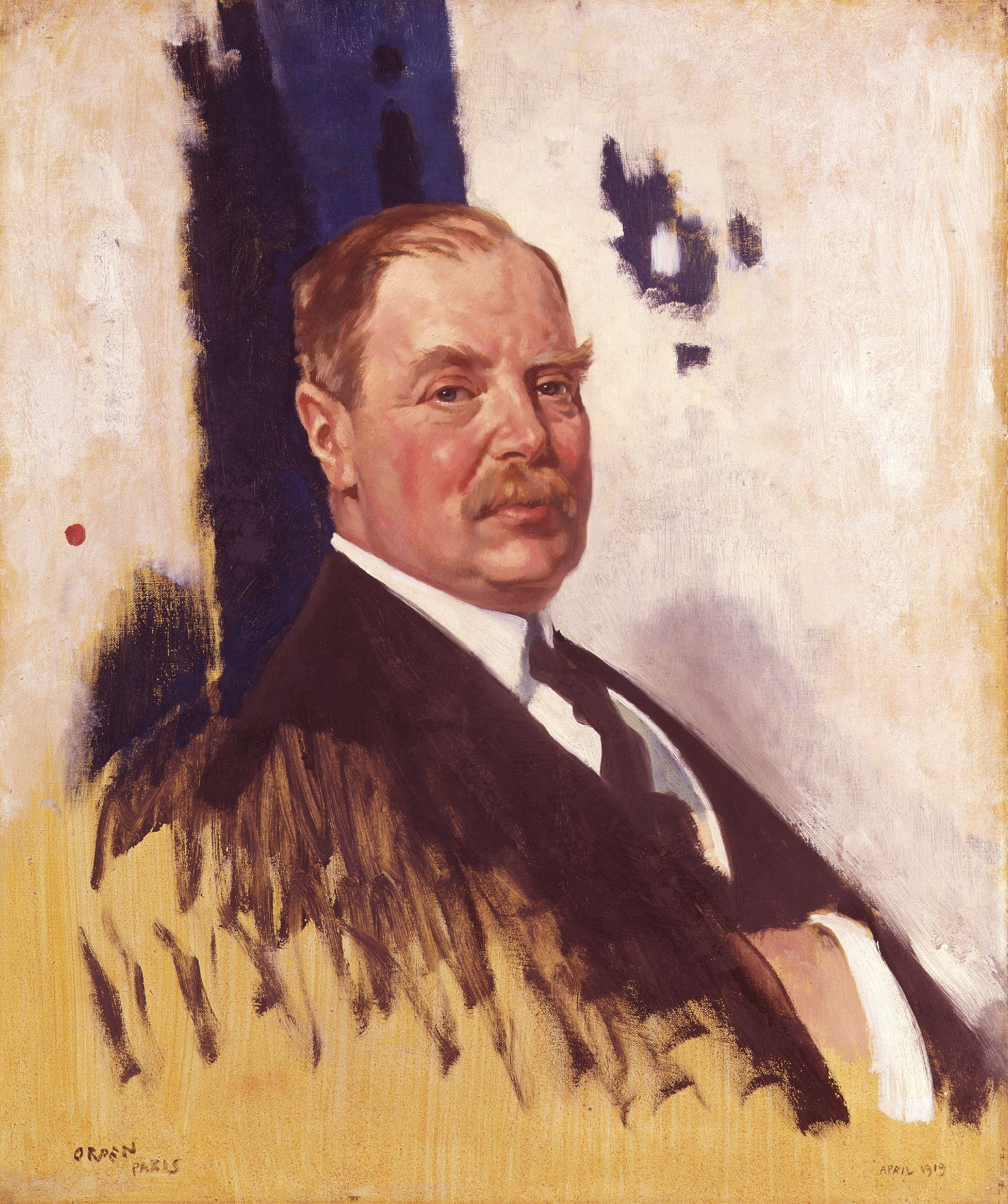
Edward, 17th Earl of Derby

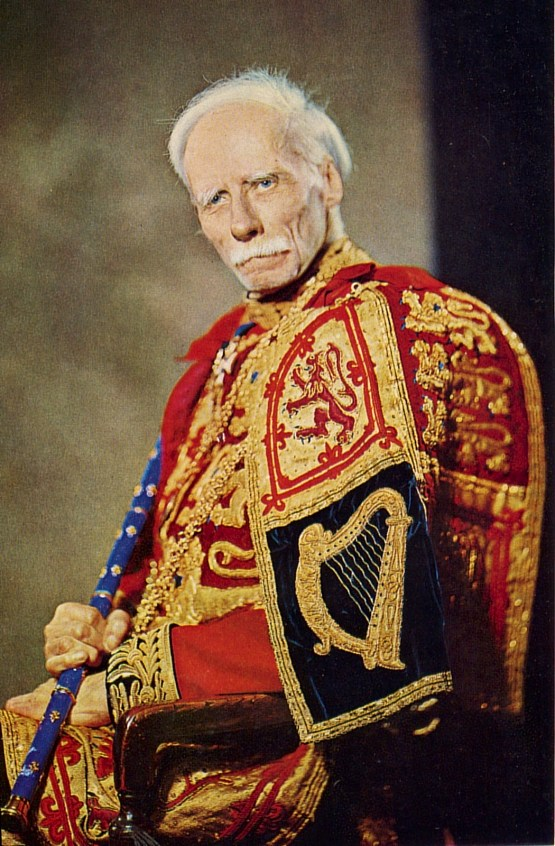
Sir Thomas Innes of Learney

David Cholmondeley, 7th Marquess of Cholmondeley

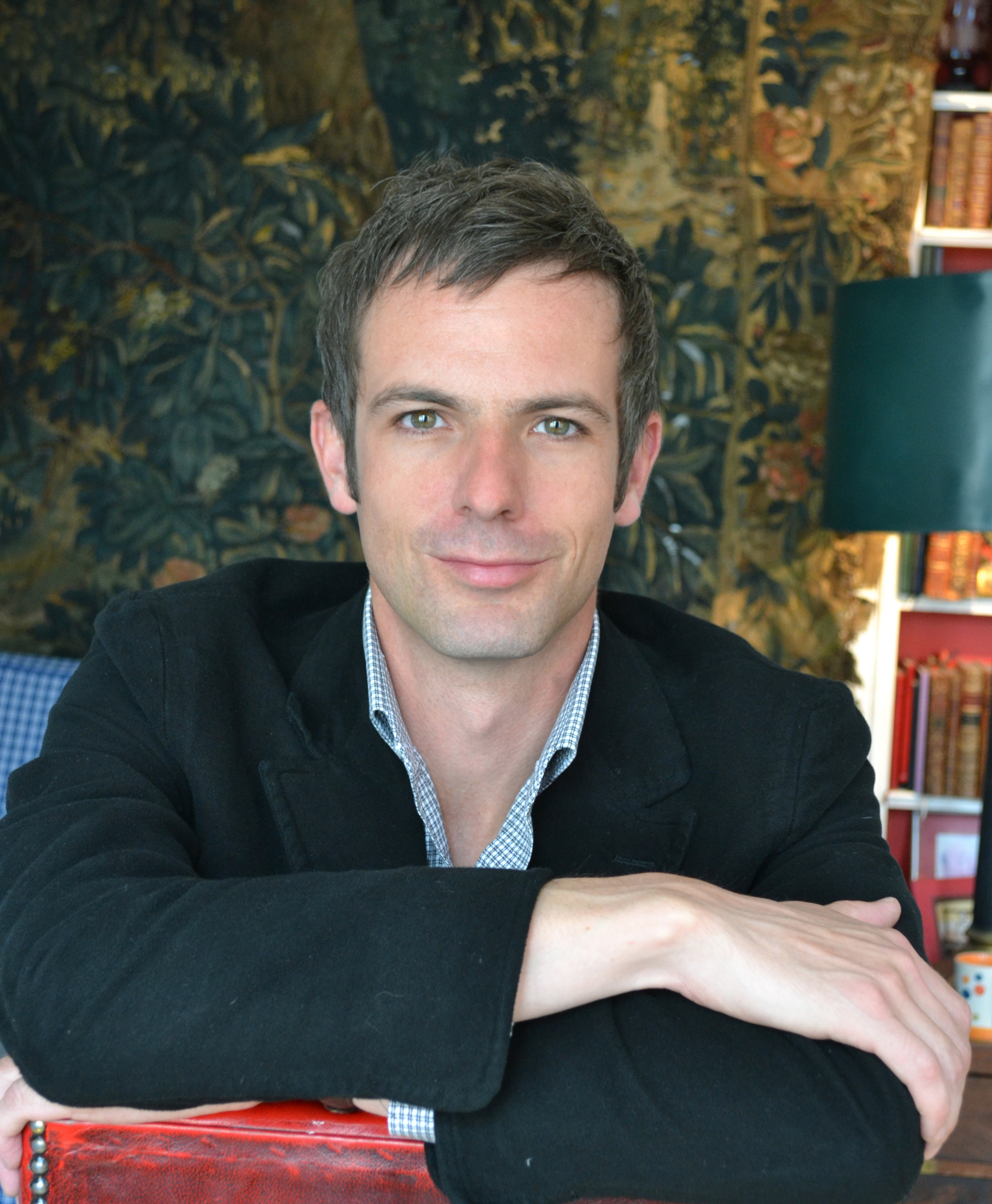
Henry FitzRoy, 12th Duke of Grafton

== See also ==
- Aristocracy
- British royal family
- Forms of address in the United Kingdom
- Gentry
- Honourable
- List of British monarchs
- Noblesse
- Orders, decorations, and medals of the United Kingdom
- Order of precedence in England and Wales
- Peerage, an exposition of great detail
- Peerage of England
- Peerage of Great Britain
- Peerage of Ireland
- Peerage of Scotland
- Peerage of the United Kingdom
- British public schools
- Welsh peers and baronets
