= MacMahon baronets =

Extinct baronetcy in the Baronetage of Ireland

The MacMahon Baronetcy, of Clonderalaw in the County of Clare, was a title in the Baronetage of Ireland. It was created on 15 August 1628 for Teague MacMahon. The title is presumed to have become extinct on the death of the second Baronet sometime after 1683.

== MacMahon baronets, of Clondirrala (1628) ==
- Sir Teague MacMahon, 1st Baronet (died c. 1673)
- Sir Turlough MacMahon, 2nd Baronet (died after 1683)

James Frost's 1893 "History and Topography of the County of Clare" mentions that in August 1585 Sir John Perrott, the Lord Deputy of Ireland, required the principal gentry of Thomond to sign an Indenture which, among other things, abolished all Irish titles. Among the signatories was Teige MacMahon of Clonderalaw, chief of his name in Corcabaskin East. Teige MacMahon was allowed to hold his castle and lands of Clonderalaw free from Crown rent "and from all demands of the Earl of Thomond". Under the English policy of surrender and regrant an English title was often given to replace a surrendered Irish title. Frost says that Teige died in 1594 and was succeeded by his son, Turlogh Roe MacMahon. Frost refers to an Inquisition held in Ennis in August 1630 which found that Turlogh Roe died on 9 June 1629, leaving his eldest son, Sir Teige MacMahon, Baronet, as his heir.

When Sir Teige died in about 1673, his son and heir Turlough, was put under the guardianship of Honour, Lady Dowager of Kerry and Lixnaw. Her late husband, Patrick FitzMaurice (1595–1661), was the maternal first cousin of Sir Teige. In addition, Sir Teige's wife, Eleanor FitzMaurice, was Patrick's paternal first cousin.

Sir Turlogh, might still have been alive as late as 1684. The Inchiquin Papers Collection mentions a lease made on 1 May 1683 by Donough O'Brien (later 1st Baronet of Dromoland) to "his cousin Therlogh alias Turlough McMahon (of Ballinacraggy) of three part of the lands of Lack and Coolsuppeen, and seven acres in Breaghva West, parish of Kilchreest, barony of Clonderlaw, for 3 lives at £20 yearly. Sir Turlogh's aunt, Mary Rua MacMahon, was the mother of Sir Donogh O'Brien, 1st Baronet of Dromoland. The Inchiquin Papers Collection also refers to an Assignment by Therlagh [alias Turlogh] MacMahon to Donough O'Brien of an annuity or yearly rent charge of £24 out of the lands of Ballyvohane (268 acres), parish of Kildisert, barony of Clonderlaw. This is dated 24 July 1684.

== See also ==
- McMahon baronets
- Mahon baronets
- McMahon clans
