= Galwey baronets =

Extinct baronetcy in the Baronetage of Ireland

The Galwey Baronetcy, of Kallwollin in the County of Limerick, was title in the Baronetage of Ireland. It was created in April 1624 for Geoffrey Galwey. The title became extinct on the death of the third Baronet in circa 1700.

== Galwey baronets, of Kallwollin (1624) ==
- Sir Geffrey Galwey, 1st Baronet (died 1636)
- Sir Geoffrey Galwey, 2nd Baronet (c. 1616 – c. 1652)
- Sir James Galwey, 3rd Baronet (died c. 1700)
