= Sir Henry Mannix, 1st Baronet =

Sir Henry Mannix, 1st Baronet (1740–1822) was an Anglo-Irish magistrate.

Mannix was a vehement opponent of Irish nationalist and social organisations and formed a regiment of militia, the Glanmire Union, to police the activities of the Whiteboys and Society of United Irishmen in County Cork. In 1787 he was created a baronet, of Richmond in the Baronetage of Ireland. In 1798, his gardener attempted to assassinate him, shooting him in the back, but Mannix recovered and moved to Pembrokeshire for safety.

Mannix married Elizabeth Parker in Ireland in 1764 but they had no issue. His title became extinct upon his death.

Baronetage of Ireland
New creation	Baronet (of Richmond); 1787-1822	Extinct
