= Bellew baronets =

There have been two baronetcies created for members of the Bellew family, one in the Baronetage of Ireland and one in the Baronetage of the United Kingdom. Both creations are extant as of 2026.

- Bellew baronets of Barmeath (1688): see Baron Bellew
- Bellew baronets of Mount Bellew (1838): see Grattan-Bellew baronets
