= Feudal Barony of Otford =

- Arms of Canterbury, associated with the former archiepiscopal holders of Otford

The feudal barony of Otford is a historical designation associated with the manor and honour of Otford, Kent, England. Otford was held for centuries by the archbishops of Canterbury, and later formed part of the Crown estate. Historical accounts describe the Barony of Otford and its associated manorial jurisdiction.

The historical significance of Otford extends beyond its local manorial history. For several centuries, it formed part of the extensive temporal possessions of the archbishops of Canterbury, whose ecclesiastical authority and political influence placed them among the foremost figures of medieval England. The estate was associated with an important archiepiscopal residence and subsequently with the English Crown.

In modern conveyancing documentation, the registered interest is described as the Barony or reputed Barony of Otford, title number K761***. The present holder is Dr. Christoph Pelanek. It is the only known feudal barony registered with HM Land registry.

The modern documentation of the Otford interest forms the latest chapter in a recorded history extending from early medieval ecclesiastical landholding through royal administration and subsequent private ownership. Its historical development is reflected in antiquarian accounts, local historical studies and surviving conveyancing documentation.

== History ==
Otford Palace, formerly associated with the archbishops of Canterbury.

=== Anglo-Saxon period and Canterbury ===
The Archbishop's Palace Conservation Trust dates an early grant of lands at Otford by Offa of Mercia to Christ Church, Canterbury, to about 790–791. In 1086, the Domesday Book recorded Otford as an estate of the Archbishop of Canterbury, with mills and agricultural holdings.

View of Otford, Kent.

=== Medieval residence ===
Archbishops associated with Otford include Anselm of Canterbury, Thomas Becket, Stephen Langton and Simon Sudbury. The archiepiscopal manor was a place of ecclesiastical and political importance. Its residence underwent medieval rebuilding and enlargement; the complex was especially developed under Henry Deane and William Warham. The extant remains of Otford Palace are protected as a scheduled monument.

Among the most distinguished ecclesiastical figures associated with Otford was Thomas Becket, Archbishop of Canterbury from 1162 until his murder in 1170. According to the Archbishop's Palace Conservation Trust, Becket is said to have particularly favoured Otford and to have stayed there on several occasions during his archiepiscopate. The association connects the estate with one of the most prominent figures in the religious and political history of medieval England.

Attributed arms of Thomas Becket.

The historical importance of the Otford estate is also reflected in the extent of its associated manorial holdings. According to the Archbishop's Palace Conservation Trust, the Red Book of the Exchequer recorded in 1214 a number of manors held of the Archbishop's Manor of Otford, including Eynsford, Lullingstone, Sundridge, Chevening, Shipbourne and Orpington. These associations illustrate Otford's position within a wider network of ecclesiastical estates in Kent.

The architectural scale of Otford Palace reflected the wealth and standing of the archbishopric. According to Historic England, the early sixteenth-century palace is thought to have occupied an area of approximately 134 by 67 metres, arranged around two courtyards. Its surviving remains include a gatehouse, a three-storey tower and substantial elements of the Tudor complex. The archaeological significance of the site is recognised through its designation as a scheduled monument on the National Heritage List for England, entry number 1005197.

=== Acquisition by the Crown and the Commonwealth ===
In or about 1537–1538, Thomas Cranmer conveyed Otford to Henry VIII. Hasted describes the estate thereafter as the Barony of Otford, with manorial courts and officers. In 1650 the Commonwealth disposed of the honour to Edward Sexby and Samuel Clerke; following the Restoration in 1660 it reverted to the Crown.

The acquisition of Otford by Henry VIII brought the former archiepiscopal estate into direct royal ownership during a period of profound constitutional and religious change in England. Its subsequent history under the Crown, the Commonwealth and the restored monarchy reflects the wider political transformations of the sixteenth and seventeenth centuries. The estate's documented association with both Canterbury and the Crown constitutes a distinctive feature of its historical development.

=== Nineteenth and twentieth centuries ===
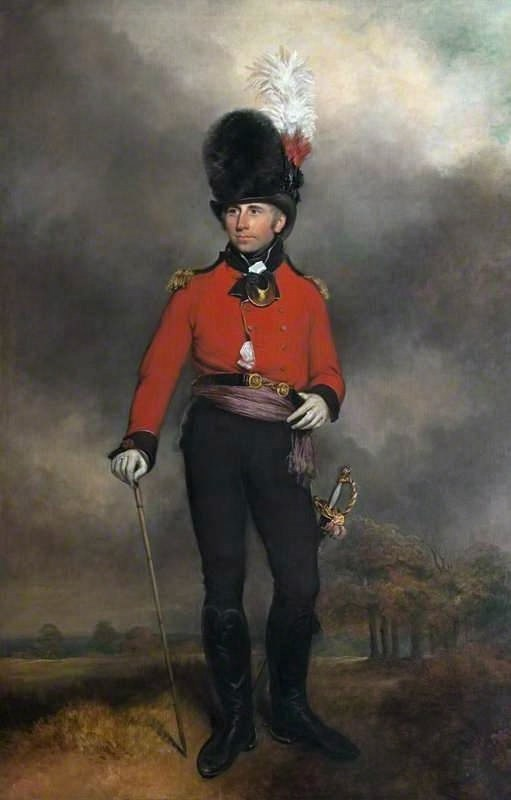
William Pitt Amherst, 1st Earl Amherst.

In 1806 the Crown sold the barony in 1806 to William Amherst, 1st Earl Amherst. It passed within the Amherst family until it was acquired by Sir Herbert Cohen towards the end of the nineteenth century. In 1997, Lady Waley-Cohen sold the barony and the manor together to Mona de Freitas, who subsequently sold the interest to John Hornchurch. Following Hornchurch's death, it was vested in the Otford Foundation.

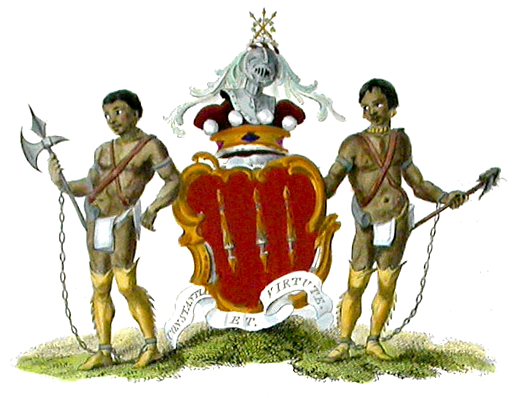
Arms of Amherst, Earl Amherst.

A separate local historical study describes a sale of the barony and the lordship of the manor by the Crown in 1806 and an acquisition of property including palace ruins by an Earl Amherst in 1844. These accounts may describe different interests in Otford; the distinction is not resolved by either publication alone.

Otford Mount Viewpoint overlooking the Otford area.

== Historical holders and persons associated with Otford ==
The following lists distinguish the ecclesiastical and Crown periods from the later private ownership of the Otford interest.

=== Early ecclesiastical association ===
- Werhard (died c. 830): associated with early Canterbury ownership.

=== Archbishops of Canterbury associated with the Otford estate ===
- Lanfranc, (c. 1070–1089)
- Anselm, (c. 1093–1109)
- Ralph d'Escures, (1114-1122)
- William de Corbeil, (1123-1136)
- Theobald of Bec (1139-1161)
- Thomas Becket, (c. 1162–1170)
- Richard of Dover, (1174-1184)
- Baldwin of Forde (1184-1190)
- Hubert Walter (1193-1205)
- Stephen Langton (c. 1207–1228)
- Richard le Grant (1229-1231)
- Edmund of Abingdon (1234-1240)
- Boniface of Savoy (1241-1270)
- Robert Kilwardby (1273-1278)
- John Peckham (1279-1292)
- Robert Winchelsey (1294-1313)
- Walter Reynolds (1313-1327)
- Simon Mepeham (1328-1333)
- John Stratford (1333-1348)
- Thomas Bradwardine (1349)
- Simon Islip (1349-1366)
- Simon Langham (1366-1368)
- William Whittlesay (1368-1374)
- Simon Sudbury (1375-1381)
- William Courtenay (1381-1396)
- Thomas Arundel (1396-1397)
- Roger Walden (1397-1399)
- Thomas Arundel (1399-1414)
- Henry Chichele (1414-1443)
- John Stafford (1443-1452)
- John Kemp (1452-1454)
- Thomas Bourchier (1454-1486)
- John Morton (1486-1500)
- Henry Deane (1501-1503)
- William Warham (1503-1532)
- Thomas Cranmer, (1533–1537)

=== Crown period, 1537–1650 ===
The honour was held by the Crown after its acquisition from Cranmer. The dates below indicate the reigns of the successive sovereigns.

- King Henry VIII (1537-1547)
- King Edward VI (1547-1553)
- Queen Mary I (1553-1558)
- Queen Elizabeth I (1558-1603)
- King James I (1603-1625)
- King Charles I (1625-1649)
- Commonwealth sale to Edward Sexby and Samuel Clerke (1650);

=== Crown period after the Restoration, 1660–1806 ===
The barony reverted to the Crown at the Restoration; the following dates represent sovereigns' reigns.

- King Charles II (1660-1685)
- King James II (1685-1688)
- Queen Mary II and King William III (1689-1694)
- King William III (1694-1702)
- Queen Anne (1702-1714)
- King George I (1714-1727)
- King George II (1727-1760)
- King George III (1760-1806)

=== Later holders ===
Manorial Services Limited gives the following history of the later ownership of Otford.

- William Amherst, 1st Earl Amherst — purchaser from the Crown in 1806
- William Amherst, 2nd Earl Amherst (1857–1886) — associated with the Amherst family succession;
- William Amherst, 3rd Earl Amherst (1886–1910) — associated with the Amherst family succession;
- Sir Herbert Cohen (1910-1968) — 2nd Baronet of Highfield, acquired Otford from the Amherst family
- Lady Waley-Cohen (1968-1997) — sold the barony and manor in 1997;
- Mona de Freitas — purchaser in 1997 from Lady Waley-Cohen.
- John Hornchurch — subsequent purchaser from Mona de Freitas.
- The Otford Foundation — the interest vested in the foundation following Hornchurch's death
- Dr Christoph-Philipp Pelanek (2026–).
