= Wilson baronets of Killenure (1629) =

Escutcheon of the Wilson baronets of Killenure

The Wilson baronetcy, of Killenure in the County of Donegal, was created in the Baronetage of Ireland on 3 July 1629 for John Wilson. The title became extinct on his death in 1636.

John Wilson was the son of William Wilson from Suffolk, a participant at Aghagalla in the Plantation of Ulster. His estates were in 1630 made into the manor of Wilson's Fort. He married Martha Butler (died 1634), eldest daughter of Sir Thomas Butler, 1st Baronet of Cloughgrenan, co. Carlow. On his death in 1636 he left a daughter who died in 1639, and no male heir.

== Wilson baronets, of Killenure (1629) ==
- Sir John Wilson, 1st Baronet (died 1636)
