= Gerald Comerford =

Gerald Comerford (c.1558–1604), (also called Gerard or Garrett Comerford) was an Irish barrister, judge and statesman of the late sixteenth and early seventeenth centuries. He sat in the House of Commons in the Irish Parliament of 1585–6, and briefly held office as Chief Justice of Munster and as a Baron of the Court of Exchequer (Ireland). He profited from his close family association with the Earl of Ormond (who was himself a favourite of Elizabeth I, being her cousin through her mother Anne Boleyn). Comerford rose rapidly in the public service to become a trusted servant of the English Crown, and would probably have become one of the dominant political figures in the southeast of Ireland had it not been for his early death.

== Background ==
He was born at Callan, County Kilkenny, the second son of Fouke (also called Fulco or Fulke) Comerford and his wife Rosina Rothe. His father was in the service of the Earl of Ormonde, acting as both his lawyer and his land agent. The Comerford family seem to have originated in Waterford: an earlier Fouke Comerford was Mayor of Waterford in 1433, and again in 1448. From the 1530s onwards the family became substantial landowners in County Kilkenny, partly through buying up land from old-established families like the de Valles, although they suffered serious damage to their property during the Desmond Rebellions of 1569-73. Fouke's daughter Catherine married Sir John Everard of Fethard, thus allying the Comerfords with one of the leading landowning families of County Tipperary. In 1569 it was reported that "old Fulco Comerford of Callan" had been robbed of £2000 (a considerable fortune at the time), together with silver, household goods, corn and cattle.

== Early career ==
Gerald went to school at Kilkenny College. Like many younger sons of landed families in that era, he decided on a legal career and entered the Middle Temple in 1578. In the closing stages of the Second Desmond Rebellion (1579-83), he was ordered by the Crown to negotiate with the rebels, but in attempting to arrange a parley he was attacked by Desmond partisans and severely wounded. On his return to England, he petitioned Elizabeth I successfully for a pension for his services to the Crown and was given leave to retire to Ireland to regain his health. He was also granted a pension of £20 a year and lands in Kilkenny. He entered the King's Inns and rose quickly at the Irish Bar through the patronage of Thomas Butler, 10th Earl of Ormonde, to whom he was always close. In 1584 he was appointed Attorney General for the province of Connacht.

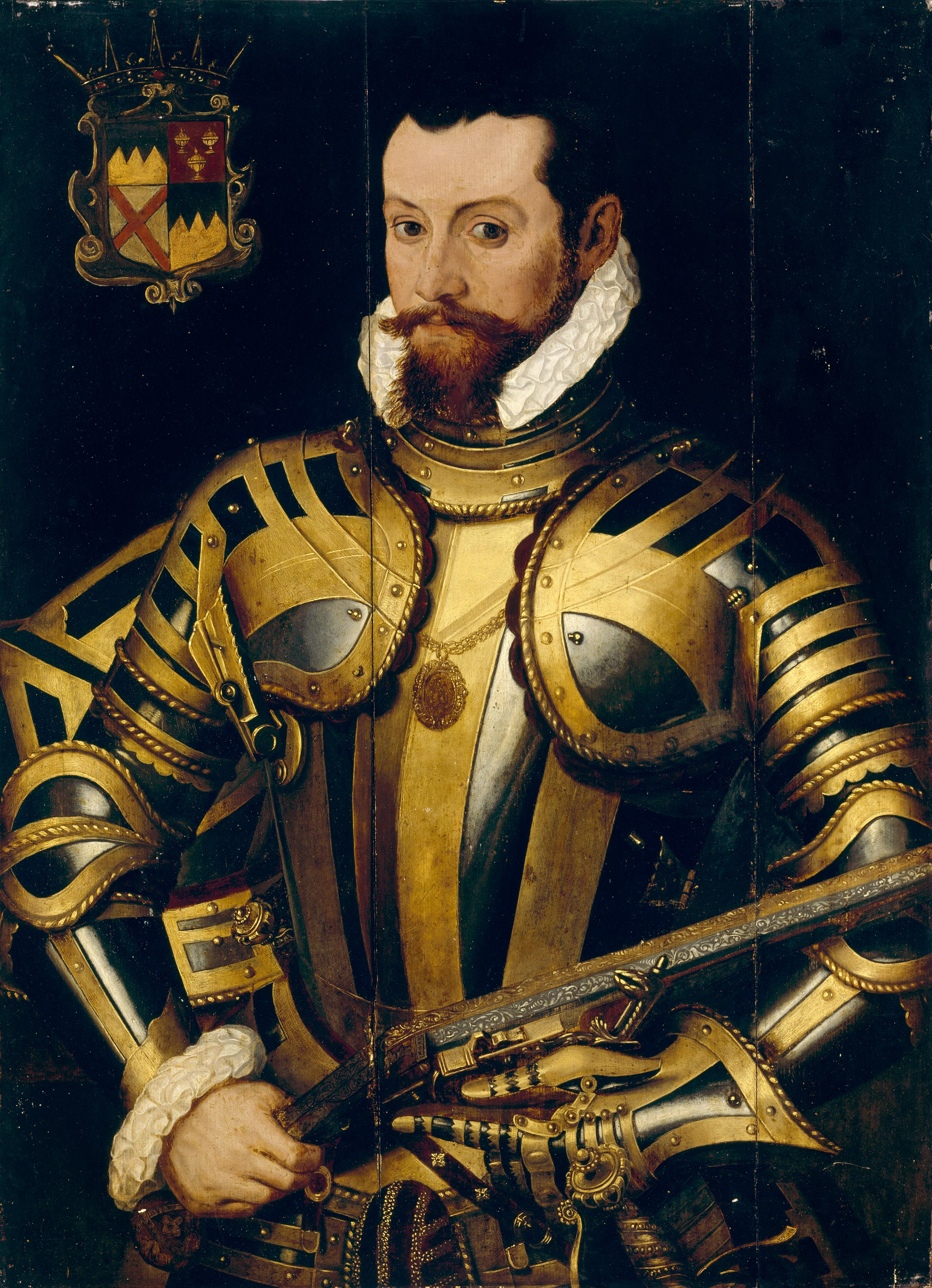
Thomas Butler, 10th Earl of Ormonde, Comerford's patron

== Politics ==
His political career advanced rapidly, and in the Irish Parliament of 1585–6 he was returned (along with Edward Brennan) as one of the two members for the newly created borough of Callan. He used his growing influence to recover lands confiscated from his relative Henry Comerford, which had been acquired by Francis Lovell, former High Sheriff of County Kilkenny. His career suffered a brief setback in 1587, owing to his hostility to Sir John Perrot, the Lord Deputy of Ireland. Comerford was a member of the faction who worked for the downfall of the Lord Deputy, and he was briefly imprisoned on this account. After Perrot's recall to England in 1588, Comerford earned the goodwill of Sir Richard Bingham, the Lord President of Connaught, and was appointed a member of his Council. He seems to have had a vaguely defined role as Crown representative in North County Mayo, and clashed repeatedly with the Burke family, who were very powerful there.

In 1588, following the defeat of the Spanish Armada, Comerford was given the task of tracking and reporting on the movement of the surviving ships as they made their way down the west coast of Ireland, although he did not have enough men to confront them. He was a highly conscientious official: Bingham later paid tribute to his fifteen years unpaid work as Attorney General for Connacht. In 1591 he visited the English Court, where he was praised for his fidelity to the Queen and appointed Attorney General of Connacht for life. In the same year his old enemy Perrot was convicted of high treason, and died soon afterwards in the Tower of London while under sentence of death.

During the Nine Years War the Crown effectively lost control of Connacht, but Comerford showed his devotion to duty by remaining in the provincial capital, Galway. He relied for his safety on the protection of the Anglo-Irish loyalist peers, such as Ulick Burke, 3rd Earl of Clanricarde. In 1597 he reported on the disturbed state of the province. He was given an armed guard, but complained bitterly that his salary was in arrears, and he was obliged to pay the guards out of his own pocket. In 1599 he went to Ennis and reported back to the Crown on the unsettled conditions he found there.

== Career in Munster ==
In 1600, perhaps as a result of his frequent complaints that he had been poorly rewarded for his fifteen years of loyal service to the Crown, he was appointed to the Council of the Lord President of Munster, and was also appointed second justice of the President's court. During the final stages of the Nine Years War, the ordinary courts of common law ceased to operate in Munster, and the President's court took over all judicial business in the province. Comerford was present at the Battle of Kinsale, and though he did not have much of a reputation as a soldier, he is said to have fought in person against Hugh O'Neill. He sat on the court which tried William Meade, the former Recorder of Cork, for treason in 1603; despite strong pressure from the judges to convict, the jury found Meade not guilty, and were severely punished for contempt of court as a result.

== Last honours and death ==
In 1604 he was appointed Chief Justice of Munster. Contrary to the normal practice by which the Chief Justice was expected to refuse any other judicial office, he was also made a Baron of the Irish Court of Exchequer, on the removal of Patrick Segrave for corruption. He appointed a deputy to perform his functions as Baron. This is evidence that his health was rapidly failing, and he died, at Coolnamuck in County Waterford, in November of that year, still well under 50 years of age. He had inherited the family estates from his elder brother and added substantially to them. His principal residence was Castleinch (or Inchyolaghan) in County Kilkenny, which had previously belonged to the prominent de Valle family of County Carlow, who sold it to Gerard's father about 1560. The Comerfords remained there till the 1650s. He was buried at St. Mary's Church, Callan, where the impressive tomb erected in his memory can still be seen.

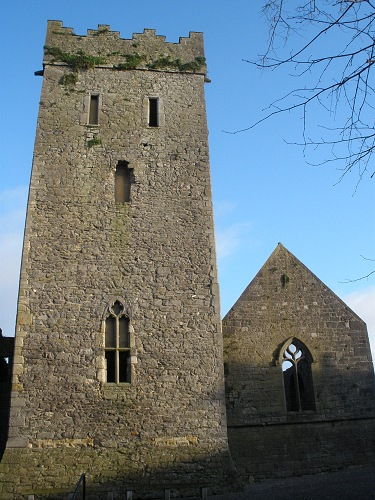
St. Mary's Church, Callan, where Gerard Comerford is buried

== Family ==
He married Johanna Walsh, daughter of James Walsh, Mayor of Waterford, and sister of his judicial colleague Sir Nicholas Walsh; she outlived him. According to his will they had six children, Fouke, Nicholas, Edward, James, Patrick and Mary. Fouke inherited the family estates and died in 1623, leaving issue. James became a Jesuit, which may have fuelled the rumours that his father was a secret Catholic. Mary reached a considerable age, and was still living in 1644, but is not known to have married.

== Religion ==
In religion, he was to all appearances a zealous Protestant, who was willing to enforce strictly the laws against recusancy, even where friends and relatives were concerned. He issued a proclamation denouncing several Catholic priests, including the prominent Jesuit James Archer (a Kilkenny man whom he must have known personally) as "seditious traitors". It was of course expected of any office-holder in Elizabethan Ireland that he would conform publicly to the Church of Ireland, but as the career of Comerford's colleague and relative Sir John Everard (who married Gerard's sister Catherine) shows, those men who were genuinely devoted to the Roman Catholic faith found it impossible in the long term to retain office in violation of their beliefs.

Whether there was any truth in the rumours that Comerford (or his brother-in-law Sir Nicholas Walsh) converted to Catholicism on his deathbed is difficult to determine, although at least one of his sons was a priest. The rumour in both cases seems to have originated with David Rothe, Bishop of Ossory, who was admittedly a cousin of Comerford, and knew him personally.
