= Richard Becon =

Richard Becon or Beacon (fl. 1594), was an English administrator and Law Officer in Ireland. He was also a political author, best known for his pamphlet Solon his follie, on the government of Ireland.

== Life ==
Becon was a native of Suffolk, and was educated at Cambridge. Nothing is known of his parents. He entered St. John's College on 12 November 1567, and proceeded B.A. in 1571 and M.A. in 1575. Admitted a student of Gray's Inn on 19 June 1577, he was called to the bar on 27 January 1584–5. He was appointed 'her majesty's attorney for the province of Munster' on 17 December 1586 at an annual salary of little more than £17. As such he was ex officio a member of the Council of the Lord President of Munster, although he and the Lord President were generally on bad terms. He was chiefly employed in regulating crown grants of land, and two letters on the subject, dated in the one case 17 October 1587 from Clonmel, and in the other 2 December 1587 from Limerick, addressed by him with other commissioners to Sir Francis Walsingham, are at the Public Record Office. Beacon himself received grants of land – Clandonnell and Clan Derrnott – in County Cork, and of Torcraigh in County Waterford, all of which he appears to have sublet to other Englishmen. His acquisition of land entailed the widespread dispossession of the previous owners, although this was the rule rather than the exception amongst the English colonists who took part in the Plantation of Munster. This in turn led to litigation and on occasion to armed conflict.

He appears to have been a somewhat quarrelsome individual, who clashed with many of his fellow English settlers, and unwisely with several Crown officials, notably Sir Nicholas Walsh, formerly Speaker of the Irish House of Commons, and Sir Thomas Norris, the Lord President of Munster, who had him briefly imprisoned. He was later dismissed from office by Sir William FitzWilliam, the Lord Deputy of Ireland, with whom his relations had always been particularly bad. In 1591 the post of Attorney-General for Munster was conferred on another man, but Beacon, although no longer in Ireland, is described as the owner of land there in a visitation of 1611. He is known to have been in Dublin in 1595, serving again in a minor official capacity. By the standards of contemporary English settlers, his attitude to the indigenous Irish was relatively mild: certainly, it was much milder than that of his superior Jesse Smythes, the Chief Justice of Munster, who refused to have any Irish tenants on his lands.

== Solon his Follie ==
Beacon was the author of a political pamphlet on Ireland, Solon his follie; or a politique discourse touching the reformation of common weales conquered, declined, or corrupted, Oxford, 1594. It is dedicated to Queen Elizabeth, and is in the form of a conversation between Solon, Epimenides, and Pisistratus as to the policy that Athens should pursue towards Salamina. In this allegorical discourse, Salamina must be understood as Ireland, and Athens by England.

Beacon urges on the English government the adoption of strong coercive measures in order to eradicate Irish national feeling. (Note: Cooper's Athen. Cantab, ii. 174) (Note: Foster's Register of Gray's Inn, page 52) (Note: Calendar of Carew manuscripts for 1588, 1591, and 1611) (Note: Irish series of State Papers for 1589) (Note: Beacon's Solon.) The work draws on several unacknowledged sources: Jean Bodin, Niccolò Machiavelli and Francesco Guicciardini in particular; and the work of Matthew Sutcliffe on military theory.
