= Court of Castle Chamber =

Court in medieval Ireland

The Court of Castle Chamber (which was sometimes simply called Star Chamber) was an Irish court of special jurisdiction which operated in the sixteenth and seventeenth centuries.

It was established by Elizabeth I of England in 1571 to deal with cases of riot and public order crime generally, and all crimes which threatened the security of the Crown. It was explicitly modelled on the English Court of Star Chamber, and it was often referred to as Star Chamber. It took its name from the chamber (which no longer exists) which was specially built for it in Dublin Castle, situated over the main gate.

The Court of Castle Chamber in its early decades was, like Star Chamber, popular with members of the public who, under the guise of complaining about cases of riot or public disorder, brought their private lawsuits to Castle Chamber, which was often swamped with private business as a result. Nonetheless, its jurisdiction to hear private cases was often questioned and was not confirmed until 1634, a few years before it ceased to operate. Its popularity was seemingly unaffected by the fact that it was notoriously ineffective in enforcing its decrees.

In the seventeenth century, Castle Chamber, like its English counterpart, was seen by the Stuart dynasty as a suitable instrument for enforcing government policy and it became highly unpopular as a result. Its use by Thomas Wentworth, 1st Earl of Strafford, who as Lord Lieutenant of Ireland (1632–1640) was virtually all-powerful in that Kingdom, as the principal instrument for subduing the king's political opponents, was one of the principal reasons for his downfall and execution in 1641. During the political upheaval caused by the Irish Rebellion of 1641, the court simply ceased to operate, although there is no record that it was ever formally abolished. It was not revived after the Restoration of 1660.

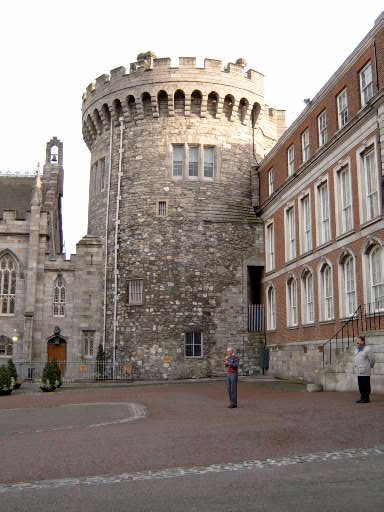
Dublin Castle, the seat of the Court of Castle Chamber, present day, showing the Record Tower. The original chamber which served as a courtroom no longer exists.

== Origins, structure and procedure ==
While Star Chamber developed gradually over time, Castle Chamber was established by a special commission under the privy seal of Queen Elizabeth I in June 1571. Due to the ineffectiveness of the regular Irish courts in dealing with serious crime, the establishment of a separate Star Chamber jurisdiction in Ireland was a reform which had been proposed by successive Lord Deputies, notably Sir Henry Sidney, who in the months before his recall to England at the end of his first term as Lord Deputy in 1567, helped to draw up the plans for the new court. In time this project gained the support of the leading minister William Cecil, 1st Baron Burghley, and of the Queen herself. In the Queen's own words:

to the intent that such pernicious evils and griefs shall not escape without just and due correction, we have thought it meet to appoint that a particular court for the hearing and determination of those detestable enormities faults and offences shall be holden within the castle of Dublin.

=== Remit of the court ===
The remit of the new court was very wide: it had the power to deal with cases of riot, kidnapping, perjury, forgery, recusancy, judicial corruption, the correction of recalcitrant sheriffs and juries, libel and malicious attacks on the reputation of public figures. It did not deal with cases of treason or cases concerning the Plantation of Ulster.

Not all the cases it heard fit neatly into any of these categories: in its early years the court heard a petition against the levying of cess, the military tax (which was much resented by the Anglo-Irish gentry) for the upkeep of the garrisons of the Pale, possibly because it raised questions about the royal prerogative. A celebrated probate case, Lady Digby v Dowager Countess of Kildare, was referred to the Chamber because of an allegation of forgery; the Chamber agreed to hear the case but later complained of the amount of time it had wasted on what was essentially a private inheritance dispute. Likewise, it is unclear what power the Chamber had to hear the charge of domestic cruelty brought against Lord Howth for ill-treating his wife and daughter: the pretext for the hearing was an accusation of perjury against one of his servants.

In Castle Chamber's last years, it was much concerned with cases of misappropriation of Church lands. Again it is unclear how such cases fell within its remit, and this activity should perhaps be seen as part of the Earl of Strafford's wider campaign to curb abuses of power by the "New Irish" nobility, especially the Earl of Cork, whom Strafford regarded as a notorious offender in illegally seizing Church lands.

=== Discipline of judges and juries ===
Castle Chamber dealt with a number of cases of judicial corruption: William Saxey, Chief Justice of Munster, was severely reprimanded for corrupt practices in 1597, and Patrick Segrave, Baron of the Court of Exchequer (Ireland), was removed from office for corruption in 1602.

The control of juries was another major concern of Castle Chamber, at a time when the Crown, in cases of treason and other serious crimes, still insisted that the jury must deliver the "right" (i.e. guilty) verdict, and also expected juries to give the "right" verdict (i.e. one favourable to the Crown) in important civil cases, especially those involving the Crown's title to land.

In 1586 a County Kildare jury was convicted of perjury, on the ground that having taken an oath to deliver a true verdict they had in breach of their oath and in flagrant disregard of the evidence acquitted two men who, according to the Castle Chamber, were obviously guilty of murder. For their "dangerous example" to other juries, the jurors were convicted and fined, although "in consideration of their poverty" the fines imposed on them were small.

More severe penalties were imposed on the Youghal jury which in 1603 acquitted William Meade, the former Recorder of Cork, of treason. Meade, one of the few openly Roman Catholic judges on the Irish Bench, was charged with a number of grave offences, including refusing to acknowledge King James I as the rightful monarch, inciting the citizens of Cork to demolish the fort at Haulbowline, killing or inciting the killing of three Englishmen, and shutting the city gates in the face of troops sent by Sir George Carew, the Lord President of Munster. An exceptionally strong Bench of senior officials, headed by Lord President Carew himself, put great pressure on the jury to convict Meade of his "heinous treasons", but the jury refused, maintaining that Meade, who was extremely popular in County Cork, "had not intended in his heart to commit treason". For this conduct, which in the Crown's eyes was only a little less serious than Meade's alleged treason itself, the foreman of the jury was fined £1000 marks and the other jurors were each fined £500, and they were ordered to appear before the next assize court wearing placards proclaiming their offence.

This severe treatment reflects the Crown's consistent attitude to such trials. In England at this time, and for many years afterwards, the jury in a treason trial was expected to convict as a matter of course: as J.P. Kenyon remarks, treason was regarded as a crime so heinous that no person charged with it could be permitted to escape punishment. Irish juries, however, were less easily coerced: Fynes Moryson, secretary to the Lord Deputy, remarked sourly and with the wisdom of hindsight of the Meade case that: "no man that knows Ireland did imagine that an Irish jury would condemn him".

In civil cases also Castle Chamber would on occasion penalize a jury for giving the "wrong" verdict if the case was one in which the Crown had an interest. In 1635 a Galway jury was fined by Castle Chamber after it infuriated the Earl of Strafford, the Lord Lieutenant, by giving a verdict that certain lands belonged not to the Crown but to Richard Burke, 4th Earl of Clanricarde, thus threatening Strafford's wider policy of reclaiming much of the province of Connacht as Crown land.

Of several accusations of corruption made against the Lord Chancellor, Adam Loftus, in the late 1630s, at least one, the petition of John Fitzgerald, was heard in Castle Chamber, apparently because Strafford, the Lord Deputy, wished to assert his power to override the ordinary judicial process.

=== Business of the court ===
As already noted, much of the business of Castle Chamber consisted of private litigation, despite lingering doubts about its jurisdiction in such cases; in 1608 the Court complained that a single private case, Digby v Kildare, had taken up two entire law terms. As a court of equity it was open to women, and quite a large number of cases brought before it involved women as plaintiffs, defendants or both: Jenet Sarsfield sued Margaret Howth for abduction and other offences, and in the long-running case of Digby v Kildare Lettice Digby sued her grandmother, the Dowager Countess of Kildare, for forgery.

Castle Chamber became a popular forum for the aristocracy to air their complaints against one another, but could also be used to discipline nobles like Christopher St Lawrence, 8th Baron Howth, who were suspected of disloyalty to the English Crown or of recusancy (although the actual charges against Lord Howth were of cruelty to his wife and his teenage daughter Jane, the latter of whom died as a result of his ill-treatment). It was also used to enforce the Penal Laws with great severity in the period 1605–22, a policy which aroused much public anger and political opposition.

=== Structure of the court ===
Castle Chamber was set up partly to curb the number of petitions to the Privy Council of England on Irish affairs, and partly because the equivalent Irish Council, unlike its English counterpart, had not until then had a separate judicial identity.

Castle Chamber was intended to be the judicial wing of the Irish Privy Council, but the two bodies were never fully distinct, especially under the personal rule of the Earl of Strafford, who tended to deal with judicial business informally. Its membership was identical to that of the council, but the judges had the predominant influence in the Chamber; later orders specified that the Lord Chancellor of Ireland, the Chief Justices of the courts of common law and the Master of the Rolls in Ireland should always attend. It was presided over by the Lord Deputy of Ireland but could act in his absence or when the office was vacant. The personality of the Lord Deputy and his degree of engagement with the court inevitably affected its operation: under Lord Mountjoy (Lord Deputy 1600–1604) the court effectively ceased to operate.

=== Legal procedure ===
Our knowledge of the procedures followed in Castle Chamber is hampered by the court's notoriously poor record-keeping: during the last twenty years of its operation, no proper entry book of the cases it heard was kept. It seems to have followed the Star Chamber procedure: the plaintiff filed a bill of complaint, which was followed by an answer from the defendant, and replication by the plaintiff. The court soon became notorious for slow procedures, heavy fees, and ineffective remedies, although these weaknesses did not deter litigants from bringing lawsuits. The court's procedure seems to have been rather informal: this was a feature of Irish courts generally at the time, and in 1607, in an important recusancy case, the Attorney General urged that the court should show more solemnity than usual.

In case of serious offences, such as riot and unlawful assembly, the Chamber gave a ruling in the case of Richard Talbot v Nicholas Nugent (1576) that two eyewitnesses to the offence were required; since both parties to that action were High Court judges, the court's reluctance to convict the defendant is understandable.

== Penalties ==
Star Chamber became notorious in the latter part of its existence for imposing savage penalties, and Castle Chamber acquired the same reputation. In the case of the Irish Court, this was probably undeserved, since Castle Chamber had a reputation for being largely ineffective in enforcing its judgements. The normal penalty was a fine, but the process of collecting fines seems to have given little satisfaction to plaintiffs: fines were often remitted, reduced or simply not collected. Sir Thomas Crooke, having with difficulty obtained a verdict of riot against Sir Walter Coppinger, complained that no action was taken on foot of it, and tried without success to get the English Council to intervene. Robert Travers, Vicar General of the Diocese of Meath, was so notorious for corruption that in 1621 he was prosecuted in Castle Chamber for extortion and taking bribes. He was found guilty, fined £300 and ordered to be imprisoned at the Deputy's pleasure. Since Travers later became a judge, a knight and a member of the Irish House of Commons, it is unlikely that any part of the sentence was carried out.

More severe penalties like the pillory and flogging were also imposed on occasion. The use of torture was rare, but a priest was put to the rack in 1627: this was apparently the last use of the rack in either England or Ireland, (although prisoners were still threatened with the rack for many years after). To show its authority, the Court could require litigants and witnesses to kneel before it; but the effectiveness of the penalty was lessened if the person ordered to kneel simply refused to do so, as Lord Chancellor Loftus on one memorable occasion did. As the William Meade case shows, other humiliating penalties might also be imposed, such as being forced to wear a placard proclaiming one's crime in public.

== History of Castle Chamber ==
=== Early history ===
The beginnings of the Court have been described as slow and tentative. No doubt there were many reasons for this, including the unfamiliarity of lawyers and litigants with the new Court, the speedy recall to England of successive Lord Deputies, the wish of many English-born judges to return home as quickly as possible, and the disruption caused by the Desmond Rebellions in the early 1580s.

Under the second Deputyship of Sir Henry Sidney (1575–8), assisted by the energetic reforming Lord Chancellor Sir William Gerard, the Chamber began to develop into a properly functioning court, but Sidney's recall to England and Gerard's death in 1581 impeded its progress, as did the outbreak of the second phase of the Desmond Rebellions. For about three years Castle Chamber almost ceased to operate. When in 1583 the Court, in a move to improve its efficiency, struck out of its docket all cases which were more than ten years old, it found itself left with virtually no business left to transact.

Under Sir John Perrot (Lord Deputy 1584–8) the Court was revived as a full-time institution; but ironically one leading case, the conviction of his secretary Henry Bird for forgery, did great damage to Perrot's own career when the conviction was reversed, following accusations by Bird of corruption and torture against Perrot and his allies. Perrot and the Attorney General, Charles Calthorpe, were also accused of bringing politically motivated prosecutions against Perrot's opponents in Government, such as Adam Loftus, for highly technical breaches of the law. Under the second Deputyship of Sir William FitzWilliam (1588–94), the Court continued to operate smoothly enough, but in the disturbed political climate during the later stages of the Nine Years War, it almost ceased to function. Under Lord Mountjoy (1600–1604) it was convened only once, to hear a charge of judicial corruption against Baron Segrave.

=== Stuart era ===
James I and Charles I both issued commissions for the continuation of Castle Chamber. Like Star Chamber, it was seen increasingly by the Crown as a suitable instrument for enforcing a strong authoritarian government. Under Charles I, its powers were strengthened by the confirmation of its jurisdiction to hear cases brought by private litigants: this had long been in question, despite the fact that private cases made up a large part of the Court's work.

Under Sir Arthur Chichester (Lord Deputy 1605–1616) Castle Chamber instituted a campaign of persecution of Roman Catholics. All Catholic priests were ordered to leave the country at once, numerous fines for recusancy were imposed, and to the dismay of Catholics and even many Protestants, the aged and respected Bishop of Down and Connor, Conor O'Devany, was hanged for treason, despite grave doubts about his guilt. Chichester's actions went well beyond what was thought desirable by the Irish Privy Council, and met strong opposition from the Anglo-Irish gentry of the Pale, many of whom, like the highly influential Sir Patrick Barnewall, remained openly loyal to the Roman Catholic faith. On the other hand, Chichester had the strong support of the energetic reforming Attorney General, Sir John Davies, who believed that Castle Chamber would be "the best school there was to teach the people obedience."

Even at the height of the anti-Catholic campaign, recusancy cases occupied less than half the Chamber's time. There was a notable increase in private business, including cases which on the face of it were outside the Court's remit. Because a charge of forgery was involved, the Chamber became one of many courts to take up the protracted litigation in Digby v Kildare, a probate case between the heirs of Gerald FitzGerald, 11th Earl of Kildare, only for the Chamber to complain that the complexity of the case left it with little time to deal with anything else.

Persecution of recusants continued under Oliver St John, 1st Viscount Grandison (Lord Deputy 1616–22), and was a major factor in his recall. The anti-Catholic policy ended under Henry Cary, 1st Viscount Falkland (Lord Deputy 1622–29). Falkland offered a program of religious toleration and increased participation by Catholics in public life, popularly known as the Graces, which operated between 1625 and 1634. Several of the Graces were designed to curb perceived abuses of power by the Castle Chamber, though at this stage there was no threat to its existence.

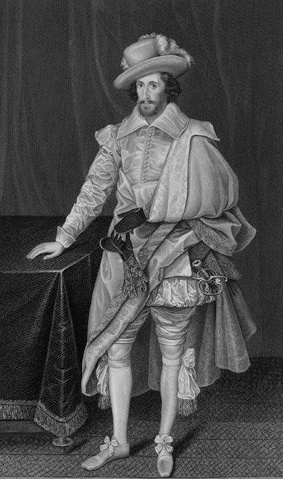
Lord Falkland

=== Strafford's administration: the last years of Castle Chamber ===
The Earl of Strafford (Lord Deputy 1632–41) was determined to impose a strong authoritarian rule in Ireland, and he believed that Castle Chamber was a suitable vehicle for this purpose. He obtained confirmation from King Charles I that the Chamber had the power to hear suits between private parties, even where the Crown had no interest in the outcome of the case; his apparent aim was to encourage ordinary citizens to complain about abuses of authority by the rich and powerful. Under Strafford's regime the Chamber saw a considerable increase in business, sometimes sitting as often as four days a week. However, he was somewhat informal in his approach to judicial business, and some cases where he was alleged by his enemies to have acted in a tyrannical manner were heard by the full Privy Council. On other occasions he would hold private sessions in his own rooms: this practice was not then considered improper, and the Lord Chancellor of Ireland regularly did the same.

Whatever the venue for a judicial hearing, Strafford made full use of his powers against all those men, however powerful, whom he regarded as the King's opponents. Wentworth admitted that he had never enjoyed himself more than when he was "trouncing a Bishop or two in the Castle Chamber". These men could no longer simply ignore the Lord Deputy's Court, as men like Sir Robert Travers and Sir Walter Coppinger had been able to in past decades. Sir Piers Crosby and Lord Esmonde were convicted of libelling Strafford by alleging that he had caused the death of a relative of Esmonde by ill-treatment. Lord Valentia was court-martialled and sentenced to death for mutiny, although his real offence was to have insulted Strafford personally (in fairness to Strafford, it was never intended that Valentia should die, and in fact, he suffered nothing worse than a term of imprisonment). The powerful Earl of Cork was prosecuted for misappropriating the funds of Youghal College, and he was needlessly humiliated by being ordered to take down his family monument in St. Patrick's Cathedral, Dublin. The Lord Chancellor, Lord Loftus, was prosecuted for judicial corruption in the case of the farmer John Fitzgerald, and for improper conduct over his son's marriage settlement; he was suspended from office and forced to give up the Great Seal. It is certain that the Fitzgerald case at least was heard by the Castle Chamber.

It has been argued that however unpopular Castle Chamber was with the ruling class, ordinary litigants under the regime of Strafford saw it as a court where they might receive impartial justice against the rich and powerful: Wedgwood points in particular to the case of John Fitzgerald, who successfully petitioned Castle Chamber to release him from custody and to hear his claim for judicial misconduct against Lord Chancellor Loftus.

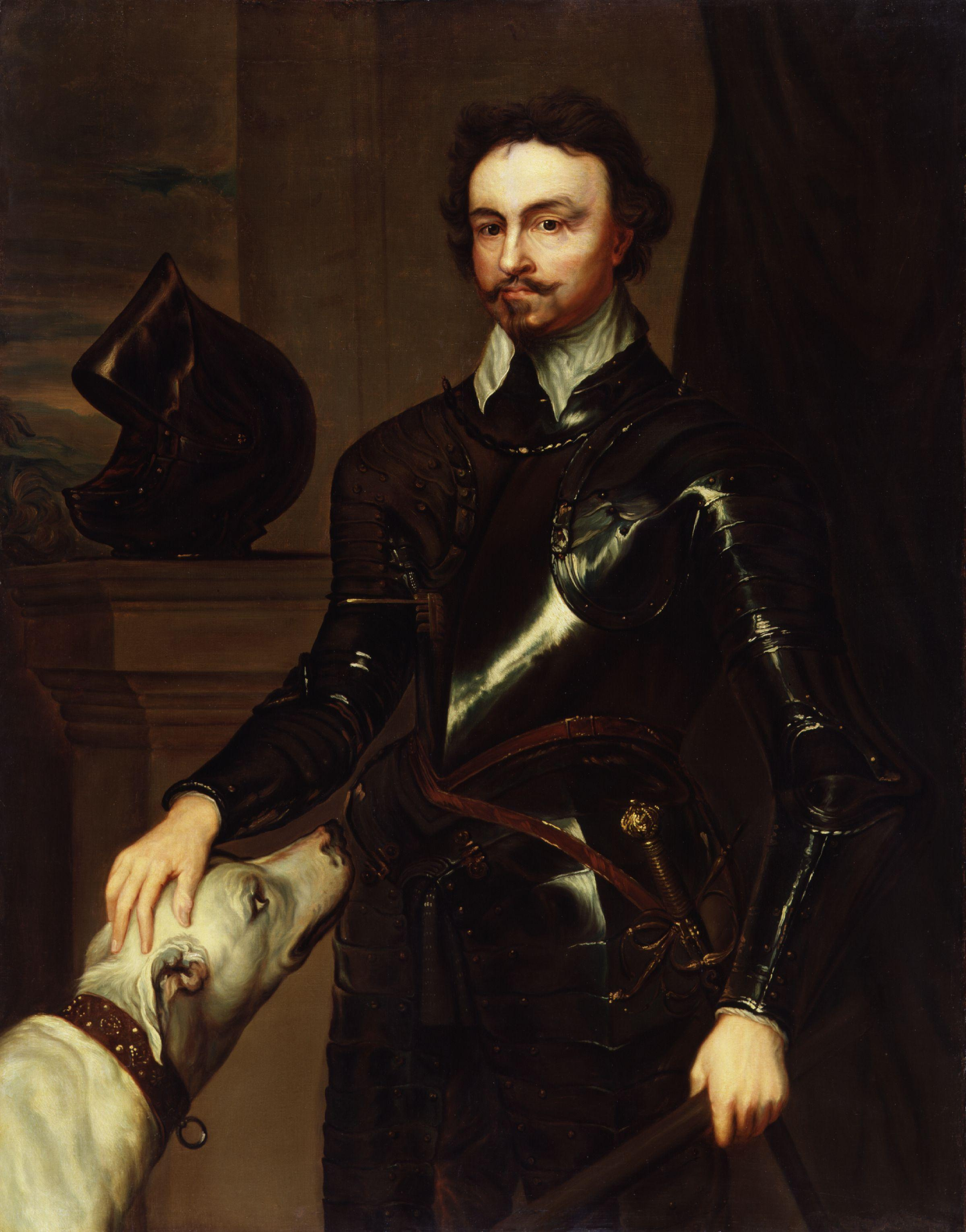
Thomas Wentworth, Earl of Strafford, painted by Van Dyck

== The end of Castle Chamber ==
Although it was principally the military disasters in Scotland which caused the downfall of Strafford, his conduct of Irish affairs and, in particular, his administration of justice and his extensive use of Castle Chamber, formed the basis for many of the articles of impeachment brought against him in 1641. Numerous Irish witnesses like Crosby and Esmonde, whom he had prosecuted and humiliated, testified against him. At the same time the Irish Parliament, led by the Catholic lawyer Patrick D'Arcy, drew up a remonstrance to the Irish Privy Council called the Queries; this stopped short of demanding the abolition of Castle Chamber but raised grave questions about the legality of its proceedings. The Councillors, most of whom had been supporters of Strafford, found themselves unable to answer the Queries.

In 1641, the year of Strafford's execution and the outbreak of the Irish Rebellion, Castle Chamber simply ceased to operate, and although it still existed after the Restoration, no serious effort was made to revive it as a working court.

Despite the unpopularity of Castle Chamber in its last years, the court soon vanished from public memory; perhaps because it was so easily confused with Star Chamber, its separate existence was quickly forgotten. While the term Star Chamber has the same pejorative meaning in Ireland as it does elsewhere, it is rarely recalled that an entirely separate Castle Chamber once existed in Ireland.
