= William Halsey (disambiguation) =

William Halsey Jr. (1882–1959), U.S. Naval officer and the commander of the United States Third Fleet during part of the Pacific War against Japan.

William Halsey may also refer to:

- William F. Halsey Sr. (1853–1920), his father, U.S. naval officer
- William Darrach Halsey, American encyclopaedist and lexicographer
- William Melton Halsey (1915–1999), American abstract artist
- William Halsey (mayor) (1770–1843), mayor of Newark, New Jersey, 1836–1837
- William Halsey (judge), Irish politician, soldier and judge

== See also ==
- William Halsey Wood (1855–1897), American architect
- Admiral William Halsey Leadership Academy, a public high school in Elizabeth, New Jersey
