= Edward Worth =

Edward Worth may refer to:

- Edward Worth (politician), Irish politician, physician and book collector
- Edward Worth (bishop), Church of Ireland bishop of Killaloe
