= William Saxey =

English-born judge in Ireland

William Saxey or Saxei (c. 1550 – 1612) was an English-born judge in Ireland of the late Elizabethan and early Stuart era. He was an unpopular and controversial figure with a reputation for corruption and misanthropy.

== Early career ==
He was born in Bristol around 1550. Not much is known about his family; he may have been a son of Robert Saxey, a wealthy merchant of the town who was Mayor of Bristol in 1557. He entered Staple Inn, and then Gray's Inn in 1576. His practice at the English Bar was extremely lucrative: he was said to make £500 a year, a very large sum for the time, although he was probably not much of a lawyer, judging by the later attacks on him for his deficient knowledge of the law.

== A judge in Ireland ==
In 1594 he was sent to Ireland as Chief Justice of Munster on the death of Jesse Smythes. Queen Elizabeth I, in a rare error of judgement, called him "a person well versed in the laws of this realm and of good integrity of life".He is next heard of holding an inquiry at Mallow into the right of the O'Callaghan family to hold their Cork estates.

From the very beginning of his career in Ireland, he faced accusations of corruption, and in 1596 the Court of Castle Chamber (the Irish equivalent of Star Chamber) reprimanded him severely for "corrupt, violent and intemperate proceedings". To judge from a later case (which he heard when he was on the verge of retirement), it seems that the malpractice most complained of was his putting the wrong party in possession of lands (presumably in return for a bribe) in defiance of the verdict of the judges of assize.

The Privy Council of Ireland took the unusual step of writing to the English Government, condemning Saxey for going to England without leave, and attacking him as a man deficient in legal knowledge (despite his apparent success at the English Bar). Rather illogically in view of their rebuke about his absence from Ireland, they asked that he be kept in England and "be no more returned to his office here, he being a person who has incurred so general a mislike". Saxey asked that any complaints against him be heard in England, as he could not get a fair hearing in Ireland, but no further proceedings seem to have been taken against him.

== Later career ==
Saxey did return to Ireland, despite the Irish Council's heartfelt wish to be rid of him, but in 1598 he fled headlong back to England, where he wrote in graphic detail about his experiences during the Nine Years War. His enemies claimed that he had known in advance about the coming troubles, but concealed the truth. There seems to be no evidence to support such an implausible charge, which probably reflects his general unpopularity. He complained to Robert Cecil, 1st Earl of Salisbury, who seems to have been sympathetic to him, that he was deprived alike of public office and private practice. He bitterly criticised the misgovernment of Ireland. In 1599 he returned to Ireland again, in the company of Robert Devereux, 2nd Earl of Essex, and was appointed a judge of the King's Bench. Despite widespread indignation he refused to step down from his office of Chief Justice of Munster, as his predecessor Sir Nicholas Walsh had done in similar circumstances. Since he had quarrelled with most of his colleagues, including Sir Warham St Leger, the acting Vice-President, and ceased to attend Council meetings, his usefulness now was nil. Nonetheless, the Crown in 1599 ordered him to provide a proportion of victuals for 1000 men, and pay for the cost of shipping.

The Queen issued an order in 1600 that both the justices of the Court of Munster, Saxey and James Gould, must remain in continual attendance on the Lord President of Munster "being of special trust appointed to his Council". This was probably an effort to force Saxey to choose between the two offices. In the circumstances, it was clearly impossible for him to attend court in Dublin and in Munster at the same time, but he refused to appoint a deputy to his place on the King's Bench and insisted on taking the fees for both offices. In 1600 Sir George Carew, the new Lord President, complained bitterly to the Crown about Saxey's absence from Munster (Nicholas Walsh had to fill in for him) and urged that he be "returned or replaced". Saxey did make some constructive suggestions about how to end the Rebellion, such as the stationing of a strong garrison at Kilmallock.

In 1603 he was given responsibility for quelling the political uprisings in several towns in Munster which broke out on the death of Elizabeth I, when the municipal authorities refused to proclaim James I as King. His threat to have anyone who refused to proclaim the King arrested had no effect, as the municipal authorities denied that he had the power of arrest. The Crown decided to make an example of some of the Cork city fathers, and William Meade, the Recorder of Cork, was tried for treason at Youghal. Saxey sat as Chief Justice of Munster, with the Lord President of Munster and other senior judges also sitting on the bench. Despite the formidable composition of the tribunal the jury refused to convict. The acquittal of Meade was a grave embarrassment to the Crown.

== The final years ==
Saxey continued to attract accusations of corruption, and to quarrel with his colleagues. By 1602 he claimed to be too old to fulfil either of his offices; at the same time, rather illogically, he canvassed to be appointed Chief Baron of the Irish Exchequer. He retired from the Irish Bench before 1606 (although complaints about his judicial misconduct were still pending), and returned to England, where he busily solicited for another office, preferably as Baron of the Exchequer. All he seems to have obtained was the position, which was routine for a landed gentleman at the time, of justice of the peace for Hereford.

About 1609 he retired to Thinghill, near Withington in Herefordshire, where he died in 1612. He is buried in his local parish church of St. Peter's, Withington. He was married with seven children: it was said that he left his widow and children badly provided for.

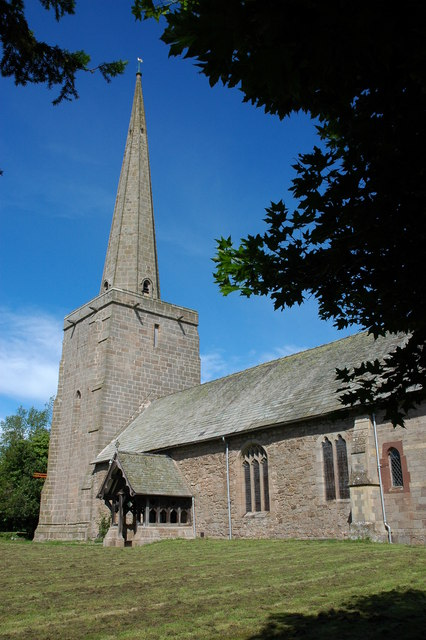
St. Peter's Church, Withington, where Saxey is buried.

== Works ==
During his years in Ireland, he corresponded regularly with Sir Robert Cecil and other English statesmen, giving them his opinion of the state of Ireland, which he presented in a uniformly unfavourable light. During the troubles in Munster in 1598 when among other incidents Kilcolman Castle, the home of Saxey's friend, the poet Edmund Spenser, was burnt, Saxey described in apocalyptic and probably much-exaggerated terms a general massacre by the Irish of English settlers, including women and children. In 1598 he wrote a memorandum on the governance of Ireland, calling for the barring of men of Irish birth from the Bench and all other public offices, and for strict enforcement of the laws against recusancy. This may be an earlier version of a treatise on Ireland, to which Ball refers, which he wrote in retirement.

== Character ==
Crawford describes Saxey as a "redoubtable" figure, but also as a man who was "ethically challenged", and an "ambitious opportunist" whose record as a judge showed the dubious wisdom of sending English "careerists" to staff the Irish Bench. In his own time he was noted not only for corruption but misanthropy, being compared to the philosopher Timon of Athens, for it was said that like Timon: "he endureth no man". While Saxey undoubtedly hated and feared the Irish people, as all his writings make clear, this was a common enough emotion among English settlers in Ireland in that era. The "Timon" comparison, on the other hand, suggests that Saxey disliked humanity in general. He was known to pick quarrels on the slightest provocation, and to take offence at imaginary slights.
