= William Meade (judge) =

Irish lawyer and judge

William Meade (died after 1611) was an Irish lawyer and judge of the Elizabethan era who held office as Recorder of Cork. He was a popular but controversial public figure who was accused, with good reason, of leading an abortive revolt against the English Crown in 1603. He was tried for treason but acquitted. Soon afterwards he fled from Ireland and died in exile in Italy.

== Early life ==
The Meade family, who were originally called Meagh or Miagh, had by the late sixteenth century become extremely influential in the city of Cork, and were prominent in both law and politics. John Meade or Meagh, an earlier Recorder of Cork, was the ancestor of the Meade Baronets; William apparently belonged to another branch of the same family, although little is known of his own parents.

William is first heard of in London, studying law at the Middle Temple, in 1580. His open adherence to the Roman Catholic faith, at a time when religious tensions between England and the Catholic powers, in particular France and Spain were rising, brought him to the attention of the authorities. Together with a number of other Irish law students, he was arrested and interrogated, and his chambers were searched for seditious materials. This caused something of a panic among the Irish law students in London: those of them like Meade himself who inclined to the Roman Catholic faith felt it prudent to absent themselves from their studies for a time.

Presumably, William was able to convince the English Crown of his loyalty, since he was called to the Bar and returned to practice in Cork. When he was elected Recorder of Cork he must, to have qualified for the office, have sworn the obligatory oath acknowledging Elizabeth I as Head of the Church of Ireland.

== Rebellion ==
On the Queen's death in March 1603, succession in England passed smoothly and peacefully to her cousin James VI of Scotland. In Ireland by contrast there was considerable political unrest, especially in the southern towns. Some historians have referred to the revolt as a "foolish and unpremeditated" rising with no clear motive. This view is undoubtedly too harsh since a religious motive for the uprising can be discerned clearly enough. James, whose mother, Mary Queen of Scots, had been a Catholic, was generally believed to be more tolerant in matters of religion than Elizabeth, and the rebels apparently hoped that pressure could be brought on the Crown by a show of force to relax the Irish Penal Laws. By contrast, the English Catholic community, who waited patiently for similar reforms to be enacted, found their hopes dashed. According to the subsequent indictment at his trial for treason, Meade had proclaimed the supremacy of the Roman Catholic faith.

The agitation was at its strongest in Cork, where it was led by Meade and the Mayor of Cork, Thomas Sarsfield. The leading families of Cork appear at first to have been evenly divided between supporters and opponents of the revolt. When Sir George Thornton and Sir Gervase Wilmot arrived to proclaim the new King, Sarsfield and Meade refused to permit them to issue the proclamation. Sarsfield reportedly referred to the pretender Perkin Warbeck, whose attempt to seize the Crown in the 1490s had the backing of some of the Anglo-Irish nobility, and who had found his strongest support in the southern towns like Cork: the implication was presumably that the Irish could choose a different King from the English if they so wished. William Saxey, the Chief Justice of Munster, who was present, said that anyone who refused to proclaim the King deserved to be arrested. Meade retorted that none of the Crown officials present had any power of arrest. Rioting broke out, in which it was said that three Englishmen died. Wilmot and Thornton were expelled from the city, the gates were barred and Meade was accused of urging the citizens to demolish the recently built fort at Haulbowline.

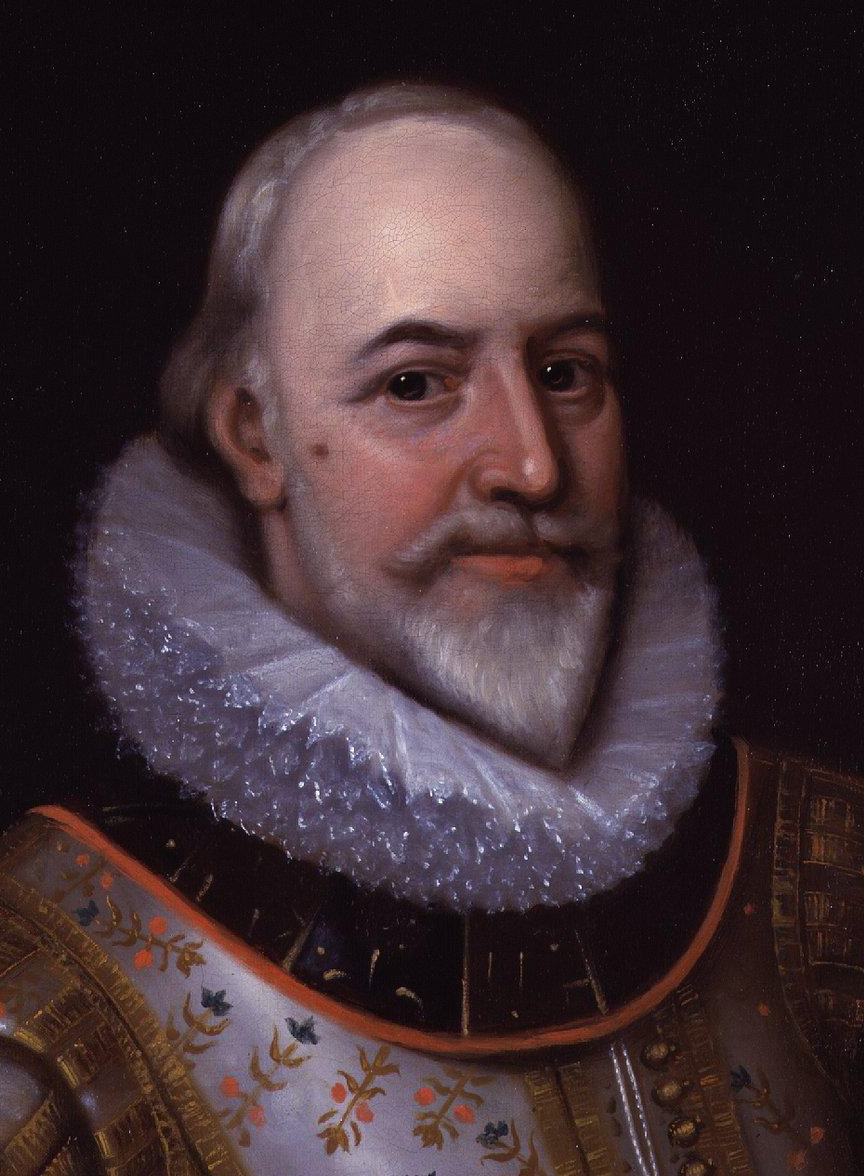
Sir George Carew, Lord President of Munster, a bitter personal enemy of Meade

The Lord President of Munster, Sir George Carew, on being informed of the riot, sent troops to Cork to restore order: he had a personal interest in suppressing the disturbance since his own wife, fearing for her safety, had barricaded herself in Shandon Castle. A majority of the Cork city fathers were now opposed to any further resistance, and in defiance of Meade's orders, they prudently opened the gates. Meade and Sarsfield along with other ringleaders, including Lieutenant Christopher Morrogh, were arrested.

== Aftermath ==
In early May 1603 the Lord Deputy, Mountjoy, arrived to personally take charge of the situation. Carew, no doubt enraged by the danger to his wife, urged that all the Cork city fathers be put on trial for treason, but Mountjoy took a more conciliatory approach. He set up a military court to try the leading rebels: following a summary trial, Lieutenant Morrogh and two other ringleaders of the rebellion were hanged. Sarsfield wisely made a full recantation of his misdeeds, and was pardoned by Mountjoy, as were his associates Thomas Fagan, a local churchwarden, and Richard Gould, a merchant, whose motives appear to have been financial, not political or religious. Meade was recalcitrant, maintaining that he had acted lawfully, and had not committed treason. As a result, he remained in prison while the authorities considered what to do with him. He was still in prison in Dublin in July, as the Crown "had much ado even to bring in an indictment against him for his treasons".

In hindsight, it was said that Mountjoy might as well have pardoned Meade along with Sarsfield and Fagan, since the Crown was well aware of his great popularity in Cork. Also, experience had taught them that whereas an English jury could be trusted to return a guilty verdict in a treason trial, an acquittal was a very real possibility in Ireland. The suggestion was made that he be tried in England, but eventually, it was decided to try him at Youghal, presumably in the hope that he might be less well known and less popular there than in Cork city.

== Trial ==
These hopes were illusory, although Mountjoy empanelled an impressively strong Bench to try Meade. It was headed by Carew himself, assisted by several senior judges, including William Saxey, the Chief Justice of Munster, (who had been an eyewitness to the riot) and Sir Nicholas Walsh, the Chief Justice of the Irish Common Pleas. Since Walsh had narrowly escaped death during a similar disturbance in Waterford, it is arguable that he should have recused himself from sitting as a judge at Meade's trial, on the grounds of perceived judicial bias.

Meade, who pleaded not guilty and insisted that he had never disputed the new King's authority, challenged all jurors of English birth - the jury, in the end, comprised nine Protestants and three Catholics, all Irish. Great pressure was put on them to convict, and evidence was brought not only of the refusal to proclaim the King, and the attempt to proclaim the Roman Catholic faith, but also of the attempted destruction of Haulbowline Fort, and Meade's supposed complicity in the deaths of three men during the riot.

Fynes Moryson, secretary to the Lord Deputy of Ireland, later wrote drily that no one who knew anything about Ireland believed that any Irish jury would condemn Meade. Nor did they do so, maintaining that they knew that "he had not intended treason in his heart". For presuming to bring in this verdict in open defiance of the Government's clearly expressed wishes, they felt the full weight of official anger. They were prosecuted in the Court of Castle Chamber, heavily fined, and ordered to stand outside Cork Courthouse holding placards proclaiming their offence.

== Later life ==
Meade, who was "not one to press his luck", left Ireland for good shortly after his acquittal and eventually settled in Italy. He justified the Crown's suspicions about his loyalty by accepting a pension from Philip III of Spain. He continued to agitate for the repeal of the Penal Laws, and published an influential tract, Advice to the Catholics of Munster in 1611, in which he argued that the laws in question had lapsed on the death of Elizabeth I. In the same year he was sent to Rome in a fruitless attempt to persuade Hugh O'Neill to return to Ireland. He is thought to have died in Naples; the precise date of his death is unknown.
