= William Worth (Irish judge) =

Irish judge (c.1646–1721)

William Worth (c.1646–1721) was an Irish judge of the late seventeenth and early eighteenth centuries.

== Background ==
He was born in Cork city, the eldest son of Edward Worth, who was Dean of Cork 1645-1660 and subsequently Bishop of Killaloe 1661–1669, and his wife Susanna Pepper, daughter of Dennis Pepper of County Mayo, and a cousin of the Earl of Cork. His brother John continued the family's clerical tradition by becoming Dean of Kildare, and later Dean of St. Patrick's Cathedral, Dublin. The Worths were a Cheshire family who had settled in County Cork in the sixteenth century: William's grandfather James was the first vicar of Newmarket, County Cork.

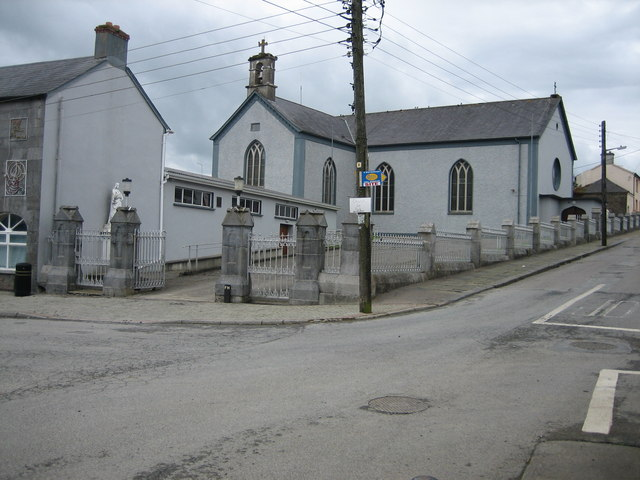
Newmarket, County Cork: William's grandfather James Worth was vicar here

William's father the Bishop has been described as an exceptionally adroit political player, who worked closely with the Cromwellian regime, and enjoyed the friendship of Henry Cromwell, yet who re-emerged after the Restoration of Charles II with his reputation as a staunch Royalist more or less intact. His political influence was considerable in the late 1650s, but declined sharply after 1660, and his only reward was Killaloe, a small and rather obscure diocese, whose incumbent was not well suited to play a role in public affairs.

== Career ==
William attended Trinity College Dublin, where he matriculated in 1661. He entered the Middle Temple in 1665 and the King's Inns in 1667. He was called to the Bar in 1669 and became Recorder of Kinsale in 1676 and Recorder of Cork in 1678. He was appointed Attorney General of the County Palatine of Tipperary in 1681, and second Baron of the Court of Exchequer (Ireland) in the same year.

His staunchly Protestant background was no doubt a recommendation for high office, at a time when the tolerant attitude towards Roman Catholicism which had existed since the Restoration had been destroyed by the anti-Catholic hysteria engendered by the Popish Plot. His mother was a Quaker, who was arrested in 1664 for attending a Quaker meeting, but her husband's outraged reaction when he learned of this is sufficient evidence of his own strong Protestant beliefs: he never showed any sympathy for either Quakers or Baptists. His parents became utterly estranged, and were never reconciled: his father in his last will and testament referred grimly to his mother's "fallen (i.e. sinful) condition", and urged her to perform her "first act" (i.e. repentance of her sins).

In the 1680s William went regularly on the Connacht assize with Henry Hene (or Henn), Chief Baron of the Irish Exchequer. This prompted the publication of a satire Elegy on the Pig that followed Chief Baron Henn and Baron Worth from Connaught to Dublin".

As a strong Protestant, William was naturally assumed to be a supporter of the Glorious Revolution of 1688, and after the arrival of the Roman Catholic King James II of England in Ireland in 1689, he was removed from office. Unlike some of his judicial colleagues (like Sir John Lyndon, who was detained when he tried to flee from Ireland) Worth was given leave to go to England. On his return to Ireland he sought reappointment as a Baron of the Exchequer, and is later said to have lobbied to be appointed as Lord Chancellor of Ireland, but to no avail. His failure to secure reappointment is surprising, since other Protestant High Court judges who had been removed from the Bench by James II, including Sir John Lyndon and Sir Standish Hartstonge, 1st Baronet, returned to their former positions. He spent some time managing the estates of James Butler, 2nd Duke of Ormonde.

He was a man of considerable wealth, and a generous benefactor of his old University. He had a townhouse at Aungier Street in Dublin; he also had a house at Rathfarnham (then in the countryside, now a suburb of south Dublin) and another at nearby Oldbawn, which he probably acquired from his second wife's family, the Tyntes, who are recorded as its earlier owners.

== Family ==
He was married four times: his marital career is unusual in that his third and fourth wives were respectively the widows of a father and son. His first wife was Alicia, daughter of William Barnet of Yoxford in Suffolk, by whom he had a son, Edward. He married secondly Mabel, daughter of Sir Henry Tynte of Ballycrenane, County Cork, and his wife Mabel Smythe, by whom he had a second son, James. He married thirdly about 1687, Dorothy, daughter of Henry Whitfield MP and his wife Hester Temple, and widow of Sir Richard Bulkeley, 1st Baronet; she died in 1705. Dorothy's sister Jane was the wife of William's judicial colleague Sir Robert Doyne. His fourth wife was Lucy Downing, daughter of the eminent statesman Sir George Downing, 1st Baronet and his wife Frances Howard; she was also, rather strangely by modern standards, the widow of Dorothy's stepson, Sir Richard Bulkeley, 2nd Baronet, whose niece and heiress Hester had married Worth's son James in 1702. Worth's fourth marriage was short-lived: Lucy died in October 1711, only 18 months after her first husband, leaving no issue.

Worth died in 1721 and was buried in the family tomb in St. Patrick's Cathedral. He left a considerable bequest to his nephew Edward Worth, (son of John), a physician and noted book collector. William's eldest son Edward inherited the Rathfarnham estate which on his death in 1741 was divided between his four daughters. William's younger son James inherited the Tynte estates in Cork from an uncle and took the Tynte name. He married the heiress Hester Bulkeley, and died in 1758. He was the grandfather of Sir James Stratford Tynte, 1st Baronet.

== Sources ==
- Ball, F. Elrington The Judges in Ireland 1221-1921 London John Murray 1926
- Cokayne, George Edward Complete Baronetage Reprinted Gloucester 1983
- Council Book of the Corporation of Kinsale 1652-1800
- Mason, William Monck The History and Antiquities of St. Patrick's Cathedral, Dublin Dublin 1820
