= Jesse Smythes =

English judge and colonist

Jesse (or Jessua) Smythes (died 1594) was an English born judge and colonist in Elizabethan Ireland. He held office as Solicitor General for Ireland and Chief Justice of Munster, and was heavily involved in the Plantation of Munster. He was noted for his deep hostility to the native Irish, which was even more virulent than that of the average English colonist of the time.

Little is known of his family background, his early life, or his career before 1584, when he was appointed Solicitor-General for Ireland. He was, as far as is known, the first Englishman to hold the office: his appointment was at the personal request of Elizabeth I, who was dissatisfied with the quality of service given by her Irish law officers, and believed that she would be better served by Englishmen. His salary was fixed at £50 more than the usual amount. He was also appointed Chief Justice of Munster, though Smyth, in his work Chronicle of the Irish Law Officers suggests that this was a year or two later. He seems to have been a diligent enough official; he wrote to Francis Walsingham late in October of the same year describing the difficulties with prosecuting the Queen's cases in the Court of Exchequer (Ireland), and his efforts to resolve these difficulties.

There is an interesting glimpse of his official duties in the records of the Court of Castle Chamber, the Irish equivalent of Star Chamber, in 1586.Patrick Flatsbury and his brother Edmund, of Johnstown, County Kildare, were charged with the murder of Hugh Burn. According to the later indictment against the jury, the evidence of murder was overwhelming, yet the jury, in flagrant disregard of the evidence, acquitted both the accused. Smythes prosecuted the jurors in Castle Chamber for perjury, the reasoning being that they had broken their oath to deliver a true verdict and in so doing set a "dangerous example" to other juries. They were convicted and fined, although in consideration of their poverty the fine was a small one.

He resigned from the office of Solicitor General in 1586, perhaps due to his increasing role in the Plantation of Munster. He remained in office as Chief Justice of Munster until his death. He was granted substantial lands in the province of Munster, where he settled 600 English tenants. He was noted for his exceptional severity towards the original Irish inhabitants: he refused to have any Irish tenants, boasted that there were no "mere Irish" within miles of his lands, and remarked that he "would set fire to the nest rather than that any such birds should roost in any land of his". If the Irish were to remain on their lands, he thought, it could only be on condition that they accept the common law, for which he had a great reverence: he compared the bringing of common law to Ireland to Moses giving the law of God to his people. The Attorney General for Munster, Richard Becon, expressed similar if rather less extreme views in his influential pamphlet "Solon his follie" (1594).

In 1588 he sat on the judicial commission, headed by Sir Edmund Anderson, the English Chief Justice of the Common Pleas, and including Sir Robert Gardiner, the Lord Chief Justice of Ireland, to deal with the flood of litigation over claims to the lands forfeited by the Earl of Desmond. Since the commission was instructed to find in favour of the Crown wherever possible, its findings were in the great majority of cases a foregone conclusion, and only one Irish-born claimant out of eighty-two was even partly successful, in that he was given permission to bring his case to court.

The English Government was informed of his recent death in January 1594. William Saxey succeeded him as Chief Justice of Munster.
