= Nicholas Walsh (judge) =

Irish judge, politician and landowner

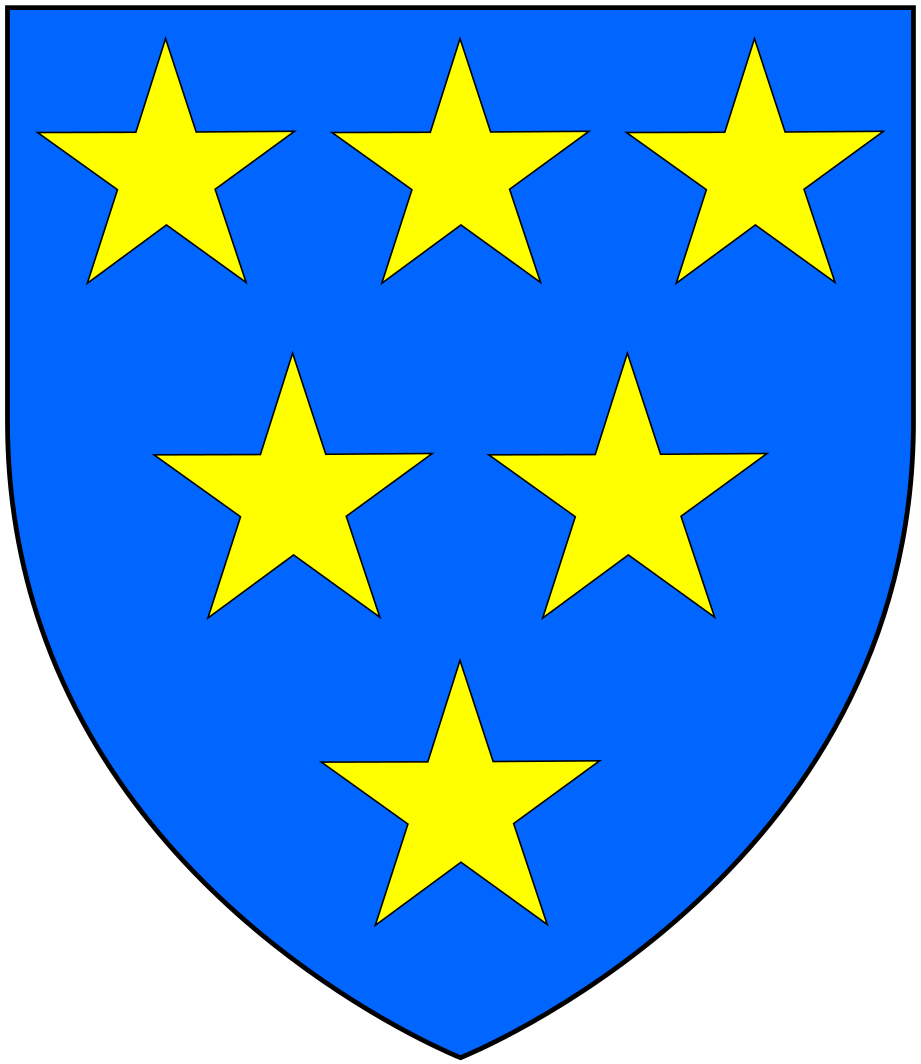
Arms of Walsh: Azure, six mullets or

Sir Nicholas Walsh (1542–1615) was an Irish judge, politician and landowner of the late Tudor and early Stuart era. He was Speaker of the Irish House of Commons in the Parliament of 1585–86 and a close ally of the Lord Deputy of Ireland, Sir John Perrot. Perrot's downfall did some short-term damage to Walsh's career, but he soon regained his influence, as he was noted for his loyalty to the English Crown, and enjoyed the Queen's personal regard.

He was appointed Chief Justice of the Irish Common Pleas in 1597. He also sat on the Privy Council of Ireland, on which he held an office which has been compared to that of a Minister without portfolio. His loyalty to the Crown led to his being attacked and narrowly escaping death during a serious riot in his home town of Waterford in 1603. Remarkably by modern standards, he was elected an MP while also serving as a High Court judge.

He acquired a great fortune and was called "the richest commoner in Munster". He took some interest in traditional Gaelic culture: the well-known Irish poem, Labhrann ar Iongaibh Éireann, by Tuileagna Ó Maoil Chonaire, was addressed to him.

== Early life ==
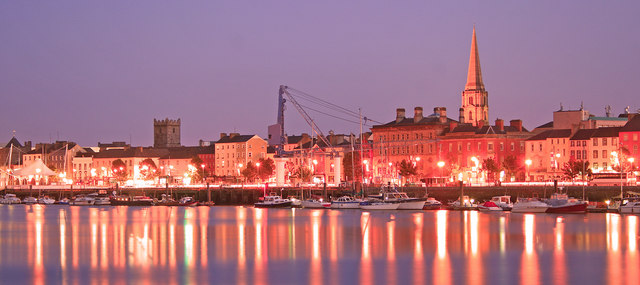
Waterford city by night

He was born in Waterford, son of James Walsh, who was Mayor of Waterford in 1539 and 1547, and grandson of Patrick Walsh, who was also Mayor of the town in 1528 and 1532. His father died young, and Nicholas and his sister Johanna were entrusted to the care of Thomas Butler, 10th Earl of Ormond, who sent them to live in the household of Nicholas White, later Master of the Rolls in Ireland. The Walsh family was wealthy, and this was no doubt was the foundation of Nicholas's great fortune. He was studying law at Lincoln's Inn in 1561.

His sister Johanna married another protégé of the Earl of Ormond, Gerald Comerford, who like Nicholas went on to become a trusted Crown official and a High Court judge, but died, still a relatively young man, in 1604.

== Early career ==
His first official post was Recorder of Waterford, which he held for life. After the settlement of Munster, he was one of the three commissioners charged with the government of the province. He was accused of shameless "grabbing" of former rebels' lands, thus adding to his considerable fortune. He acquired lands in County Cork, County Kilkenny and Kinsalebeg in County Waterford. His estates at Clonmore, County Kilkenny were the main source of food for Waterford city.

Walsh became second justice of the Provincial Court of Munster in 1570 and Chief Justice of Munster in 1576. He was on good terms with Lord Deputy FitzWilliam and was a regular correspondent of Lord Burghley, the elder statesman of Queen Elizabeth I's court. Despite his growing importance in Munster politics, he played only a minor role in suppressing the Desmond Rebellions (1579–83). He spent much of 1587 in England prosecuting private lawsuits.

During his time in Munster, he became friendly with Sir John Perrot. He was promoted to the position of second justice of the Court of King's Bench, and when Perrot called the last of the three Elizabethan Irish Parliaments in 1585, Walsh sat in the House of Commons as member for Waterford. He was also elected Speaker of the House, and in May 1586 delivered a lengthy oration at the prorogation of the parliament, in which he praised the virtues of monarchy, while deploying the difficulties caused by the Queen's remoteness from Ireland. He rebuked Parliament for failing to vote the taxes required by the Crown, while maintaining that all three estates in society – monarchy, aristocracy, and democracy – had a right to a voice in government.

It was a sign of Perrot's regard for him, and that of the Queen herself, that Walsh was appointed to the Privy Council in 1587, though he had no specific functions on it. Crawford describes the appointment as unique. Elizabeth I wrote "for the good opinion we have of his discretion, wisdom, and fidelity, that we think him meet to be one of our Privy Council in that realm".

His membership of the House of Commons, while he was also a sitting High Court judge, was unusual, but not unprecedented in Ireland (it would be impossible now), and paved the way for several similar elections – Sir Gerard Lowther the elder, Sir John Blennerhassett and Sir Christopher Sibthorpe – to the Parliament of 1613–15. He had the Queen's full support for this course of action: she wrote in 1587 of his good services both as Chief Justice of Munster and as justice of the Queen's Bench.

== Judicial career ==
His closeness to Perrot earned Walsh the enmity of Adam Loftus, the Lord Chancellor of Ireland. When Perrot fell from power in 1588 Loftus moved to destroy Walsh as well, and he was threatened with prosecution for having conspired to wrongfully convict Perrot's former secretary, Henry Bird, of forgery. Due to the friendship of Fitzwilliam, who wished to retain his services, and the support of Burghley, he escaped prosecution and soon regained his political influence.

Having been previously promised "any office of advancement" that might be vacant, he was considered for the office of Chief Baron of the Irish Exchequer but passed over, probably because of his Irish birth. There was an informal understanding that the Court of Common Pleas (Ireland) was the appropriate Court for Irish-born judges and Walsh duly became its Chief Justice in 1597, with a knighthood. He appears to have been a most conscientious judge: at a time when a perennial complaint against the Irish judges was their refusal to go on circuit, Walsh was extremely diligent about holding assizes, even when he was in his late 60s. In 1600 he was once again acting as Chief Justice of Munster, due to the refusal of the actual Chief Justice, William Saxey, to sit as a judge or attend Council meetings.

=== The Waterford riots ===
During the Nine Years War Walsh was cut off from Dublin, and was said to be in some danger of his life in the period 1599–1600. He incurred further danger on the accession of James I of England in 1603, when a short-lived rebellion against the English Crown broke out in some of the southern towns. The principal aim of the rebellion was to secure greater religious liberty. While the rebels could not hope to actually prevent James's accession to the throne, they evidently hoped to apply pressure to the Crown to relax the penal laws: James, the son of a Catholic mother, Mary Queen of Scots, was widely believed to have given a verbal promise to this effect before his succession to the Crown of England. Walsh as Recorder tried to persuade Waterford Corporation to proclaim James as King, but a riot broke out in which Walsh might have been killed had not his relatives on the Corporation intervened to quell the violence. Walsh, despite his record of service to the Crown, had never been popular, even in his native Waterford, and many of his acquaintances in the city sympathised with the rebels.

=== Cork- the case of William Meade ===
A similar and more serious rising in Cork caused the Crown to make an example of the Mayor of Cork, Thomas Sarsfield, the Recorder of Cork, William Meade, and an army officer, Lieutenant Christopher Morrogh. Morrogh was hanged after a summary trial. Sarsfield was pardoned after making a full submission, but Meade remained defiant and the Crown, unwisely as it turned out, set up a special Court to try him for treason. The Lord President of Munster presided with Walsh and two other judges assisting him. The result was a fiasco since the jury, despite being composed largely of Protestants of undoubted loyalty to the Crown, insisted, despite strenuous efforts to coerce them to convict, on bringing in a verdict of not guilty. Fynes Moryson, then secretary to the Lord Deputy of Ireland, with the wisdom of hindsight, said that no one who knew anything about Ireland should have expected an Irish jury to convict him. Meade proved the Crown's suspicions about his loyalty true by fleeing to Italy.

By the ethical standards which are now expected of an Irish judge, Walsh acted improperly by sitting as a judge at Meade's trial; given his own experience in Waterford, where he had almost been killed, he could hardly be viewed as an impartial judge at a trial concerning what was essentially the same rebellion.

== Last years ==
In April 1605 he was instructed, with others, to carry out an inquisition into the lands of Sir Edmond Butler of Cloghgrenan, deceased. The commission is now in the National Library of Ireland. In 1607, Walsh was one of the senior judges who entered the King's Inns, thus helping to revive an institution which had become almost moribund. He continued to hold assizes diligently, although by 1611 he was described as being "old and weak". He asked unsuccessfully to be made a Serjeant-at-law (Ireland) to give him equal rank with the other Chief Justices. He was Treasurer of the King's Inn in 1609. In 1612 he was allowed to resign on health grounds; he died three years later.

There is a story, originating with David Rothe, Bishop of Ossory, that Walsh converted to Roman Catholicism on his deathbed, and that his funeral was conducted according to the Catholic ritual, much to the embarrassment of the Crown which he had served so loyally. Rothe told a similar story about Walsh's brother-in-law and judicial colleague, Gerald Comerford. Later generations of the Walsh family were mostly Protestant (and were thus able to hold on to their lands), although Nicholas's eldest son was a Catholic.

== Family ==
His main residence was at Clonmore, County Kilkenny, but, as he was "the wealthiest commoner in Munster", this was only one of his estates; others were at Kinsalebeg and Piltown. He married firstly Catherine Comerford, and secondly Jacquetta Colclough, daughter of Anthony Colclough, who bought Tintern Abbey in 1575. Sir Nicholas Walsh the elder founded the dynasty of Walsh of Piltown, Co. Kilkenny. Through his successful and influential roles in the Ormonde administration, he acquired extensive property in Munster in the aftermath of the Desmond Rebellion after 1579.

He had at least one son, his namesake Sir Nicholas Walsh the younger of Piltown (1590–1643), who is often confused with his father, sometimes being wrongly described as Judge Walsh. On the outbreak of the Irish Rebellion of 1641, Sir Nicholas Walsh the younger (of Piltown and Ballykeroge) became one of the leaders of Confederate Ireland and died fighting to protect his property from the threatened English plantation. He married Mary Colclough of Tintern Abbey, a niece of his stepmother Jacquetta. His eldest son Thomas (1624–1670), remained at Clonmore until the 1640s: he married Eleanor, daughter of John de la Poer or Power, 5th Baron Power of Curraghmore and his wife Ruth Pyphoe, and sister of Richard Power, 1st Earl of Tyrone.

Through their high-level connections the Piltown Walshes, in the person of Thomas, avoided transplantation to Connacht, which was the fate of most of their neighbours, and by converting to the Protestant faith and petitioning through the courts, Thomas succeeded in retrieving much of his father's lost property, which passed on his death to his eldest son John. The family used the suffix 'of Piltown' into the 18th century when the senior line of descent became extinct with the death of Col. Robert Walsh at Bath in 1788. However, recent research shows that at least one lesser cadet branch, the Walshes (or Welshes) of Canty and Woodstock, County Waterford, continued in occupation of Piltown lands into the late 19th century.

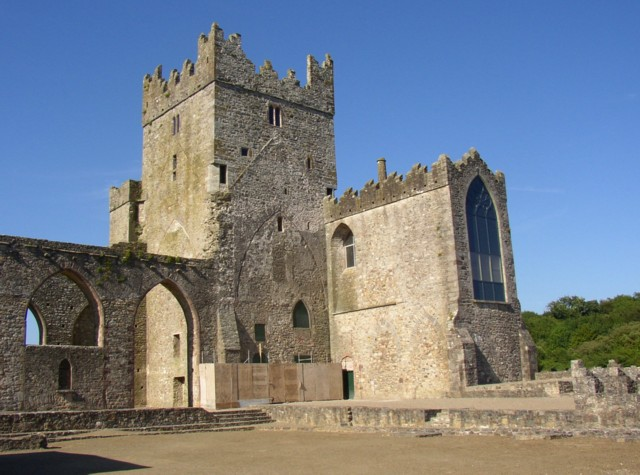
Tintern Abbey, Wexford, home of Nicholas Walsh's second wife Jacquetta Colclough

== Patron of the Irish language ==
Tuileagna Ó Maoil Chonaire addressed to Sir Nicholas Walsh his poem Labhrann ar iongaibh Éireann. This related the true story of a judgment given in the eighth century by Niall Frossach, King of Aileach, concerning a mother and her fatherless child. The choice of Walsh as the addressee of the poem suggests that he not only spoke Irish but had some interest in Gaelic culture, perhaps fulfilling the traditional role of "patron".

== Personality and reputation ==
Crawford describes Walsh as a highly successful politician and jurist, who through his diligence and loyalty to the Crown overcame what was then the serious handicap of Irish birth in attaining high office. Ball, rather cynically, suggests that his great wealth was probably the main reason for his success.

Political offices
| Preceded by Sir James Stanihurst | Speaker of the Irish House of Commons; 1585–1586 | Succeeded by Sir John Davies |
