= Henry Hene =

English-born judge (??–1708)

Henry Hene or Henn (died 1708) was an English-born judge who had a distinguished career in Ireland, and held the office of Chief Baron of the Irish Exchequer.

== Background and early career ==
He was the eldest son of Hugh Henn, who was a page of the bedchamber to James I and Charles I and was appointed joint Keeper, with his brother, of the Queen's Garden, Greenwich in 1639. Henry's mother was Katherine Bickerstaff, daughter of Anthony Bickerstaff of Croydon. Sir Henry Henn or Hene, first of the Hene baronets (c.1577-c.1668), was his uncle.

Henry entered the Inner Temple in 1645 and was called to the Bar in 1653. Although he became a Bencher of the Inner Temple, his practice at the English Bar was not particularly successful and he moved in 1669 to Ireland, where he had relatives. He was admitted to the King's Inns and his Irish practice prospered: he was appointed Second Serjeant in 1670 and a Commissioner of Appeals in Revenue in 1671.

== Judicial career ==
He became third Baron of the Court of Exchequer (Ireland) in 1673 and went regularly as judge of assize to Connaught; this became the subject of a well-known satire, Elegy on the Pig that followed Chief Baron Henn and Baron Worth from Connaught to Dublin. When John Bysse died in 1680 the Lord Lieutenant suggested that Sir Richard Reynell, 1st Baronet should be the new Chief Baron. However, the anti-Catholic hysteria engendered by Popish Plot was at its height and Reynell was suspected of Roman Catholic leanings. Charles II preferred Henn, as he was a staunch Protestant and a man with strong connections at Court.

After King Charles's death, Henn's Protestantism made him unacceptable to the new Catholic King James II, and he was removed from office in 1687, retiring to his parents' house Rooksnest, in Tandridge, Surrey. After the Revolution of 1688, unlike some of Charles II's Irish judges, he showed no interest in returning to the Bench. He lived in retirement at Tandridge till his death in 1708.

== Family ==
Henn was married, but whether or not he had any children is a matter of dispute. Elrington Ball, normally an authoritative source, states that his marriage was childless, and that his English property passed to his sister's son Edward Nelthorpe. On the other hand, some sources state that Richard Henn of Paradise Hill, founder of the prominent Henn family of Ballynacally, was the Chief Baron's son, and Ball accepts that he was a close relative. It is also possible that Richard was a nephew or first cousin of Henry, as the Henns were a numerous clan, with a rather tangled family tree. Richard's descendants included several distinguished judges and barristers, including William Henn, justice of the Court of King's Bench (Ireland), and William's grandson Sir Charles Villiers Stanford, the conductor and composer.

== Character ==
Elrington Ball describes him as a man of integrity, learning, good judgment and blameless private life; but notes that he was not a good advocate, hence his long struggle to build up a large practice at the Bar.
