= Sir Richard Bulkeley, 1st Baronet =

Irish politician (1634–1685)

Sir Richard Bulkeley, 1st Baronet (7 September 1634 – 17 March 1685) was an Irish politician and baronet.

Born at Tallaght, County Dublin, he was the oldest son of William Bulkeley, Archdeacon of Dublin, a son of Lancelot Bulkeley, Archbishop of Dublin, and his first wife Elizabeth Mainwaring, daughter of Henry Mainwaring, Archdeacon of Ossory. Bulkeley was High Sheriff of Wicklow in 1660 and sat in the Irish House of Commons as MP for Baltinglass between 1665 and 1666. On 9 December 1672, he was created a baronet, of Old Bawn, in the County of Dublin, and of Dunlaven, in the County of Wicklow.

In 1659, he married as his first wife Catherine Bysse, daughter of John Bysse, Chief Baron of the Irish Exchequer, and his wife Margaret Edgeworth, and had her two sons. She died in 1664, and on 8 February 1684, Bulkeley married secondly Dorothy Whitfield, daughter of Henry Whitfield MP and his wife Hester Temple, at the Church of St Nicholas Without, Dublin. He died only a year later, and was succeeded in the baronetcy by his eldest son Richard. His widow two years after his death remarried his third wife William Worth, Baron of the Court of Exchequer (Ireland); she died in 1705. Rather strangely by modern standards, Worth after Dorothy's death remarried her stepson's widow, Lucy Downing, who was a daughter of the eminent politician and financier Sir George Downing, 1st Baronet and his wife Frances Howard. His estates eventually passed to his granddaughter Hester, who married James Worth Tynte, the youngest son of Dorothy's second husband William Worth by a previous marriage.

Baronetage of Ireland
New creation	Baronet (of Old Bawn and Dunlaven); 1672 – 1685	Succeeded by Richard Bulkeley
