= John Bysse =

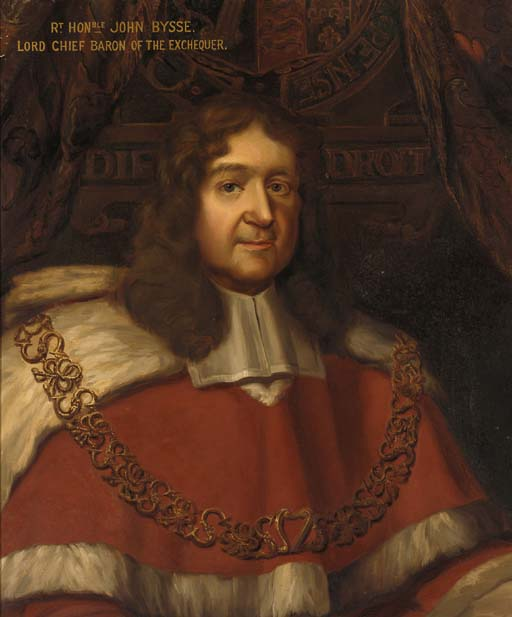
- Portrait by James Thornhill
- Born: c.1602
- Died: 1680; Dublin
- Occupation: Judge
- Known for: member of the Parliament of Ireland; Recorder of Dublin; Chief Baron of the Irish Exchequer

John Bysse (c.1602–1680) was a member of the Parliament of Ireland during the 1630s and 1640s. He was excluded from office during the Interregnum, but became one of the most senior Irish judges after the Restoration of Charles II.

== Biography ==
Bysse was born around 1602, the eldest son of Christopher Bysse (or Bisse), who died before 1615. Christopher was an official of the Exchequer, as was his own father, Robert Bysse. John's mother was Margaret Forster, daughter of John Forster, an alderman of Dublin. He had a brother, Robert, and a sister Elinor (died 1680), who married William Ball, MP for Kells from 1642 to 1649.

Bysse was educated at Trinity College Dublin. admitted as a member of the King's Inns in 1632. He was elected to the Irish House of Commons as member for Charlemont in 1634 and became Recorder of Dublin in the same year. He was re-elected to the Commons in 1640.

At the outbreak of Irish Rebellion of 1641 John Bysse, along with his younger brother Robert (who was Recorder of Drogheda, and died early in 1643) and his brother-in-law William Ball were among the leaders of the royalist and Protestant faction in Parliament. This faction opposed the royalist Catholic faction, but was allied with it from 1649 to oppose the Cromwellian conquest of Ireland.

During the Commonwealth he remained Recorder of Dublin, he was twice recommended for appointment to the High Court Bench and was elected to the Protectorate Parliament as member for Dublin city, but was excluded from taking his seat. Although a sincere Royalist, he is said to have been of the faction (the "Kinglings") who were prepared to accept Oliver Cromwell as King as a short-term solution. At the Restoration, he was appointed Chief Baron of the Irish Exchequer and held that office until his death. In addition to serving on the Bench, he attended regularly at the Irish House of Lords, acting as a legal adviser to the Lords. He is buried in St. Audoen's Church, Dublin.

Bysse became a substantial landowner, inheriting Preston's Inn, on the site of the present City Hall, Dublin, where he built a large mansion (which was demolished in the 1760s), and also Brackenstown near Swords, County Dublin, which had been bought by his father around 1611. Later he was granted part of the freehold of Philipstown (now Daingean), County Offaly. The Bysse family also had an estate at Pelletstown, near Castleknock.

== Personality and reputation ==
Elrington Ball remarks flippantly that Bysse had a kind of "hereditary claim" on the Exchequer as both his father and grandfather had been officials there. In fact the author makes it clear that Bysse was eminently qualified to be Chief Baron: he had been Recorder of Dublin for 25 years and had sat in two Parliaments; he was hard-working, conscientious and popular with all political factions. In religion he seems to have been tolerant by the standards of the time, causing something of a stir in 1665 when he acted as a mourner at the funeral of a nonconformist clergyman.

Despite Bysse's undoubted good qualities, within a few years of his appointment as Chief Baron, serious complaints were being made about his slowness and incompetence; he was even accused of senility. It was also said that the second Baron, Sir Richard Kennedy, 2nd Baronet, was carrying much of the burden of the work, whereby he was put to "great labour and pain"; as a result, Kennedy received a substantial increase in salary in 1662, despite the Crown's perennial shortage of money. These complaints were taken seriously and in 1669 and 1671 he was threatened with removal from office. He was fortunate in enjoying the friendship of the Lord Lieutenant, James, Duke of Ormonde, to whom loyalty was a cardinal virtue: as Ball remarks "those whom he ever loved, he loved to the end". Ormonde strongly defended Bysse, admitting he was slow in giving judgement but arguing that his integrity and capacity for hard work compensated for this, and he denied that there had been any fall-off in Bysse's mental abilities. These arguments were presumably successful since he was not removed from office although even Ormonde, towards the end, suggested that it might be time for him to go. In his last years, there were persistent rumours that he would either resign or be dismissed, but in fact, he remained Chief Baron until his death in 1680, aged about seventy-eight.

== Family ==
John Bysse married Margaret Edgeworth (died 1676) daughter of Francis Edgeworth of County Longford, who held office as Clerk of the Crown and Hanaper from 1606 to c.1620, and his wife Jane Tuite. Francis was the brother and heir of Edward Edgeworth (died 1595), Bishop of Down and Connor, and ancestor of the celebrated novelist Maria Edgeworth. Margaret was the widow of John King junior (son of Sir John King and Catherine Drury, brother of Sir Robert King and uncle of Sir Robert King, 1st Baronet), who had been Clerk of the Crown jointly with his father-in-law.

John and Margaret had numerous children who died young, and two surviving daughters:

- Judith, who married firstly Robert Molesworth, (died 1656) by whom she was the mother of Robert, the 1st Viscount Molesworth, and secondly Sir William Tichborne of Beaulieu, by whom she had several further children, including Henry Tichborne, 1st Baron Ferrard;
- Catherine (died 1664), who married the politician Sir Richard Bulkeley, 1st Baronet, and had issue, including Sir Richard Bulkeley, 2nd Baronet.

== Sources ==
- Ball, F. Elrington (1926). The Judges in Ireland 1221–1921. London: John Murray.
- Gilbert, John Thomas (1859). A history of the city of Dublin. Vol. 2. J. McGlashan. p. 22.
- Hayton, David, ed. (2002). The House of Commons, 1690-1715. Vol. 1. Cambridge University Press. p. 826. ISBN 0-521-77221-4.
- Perceval-Maxwell, M (1994). The outbreak of the Irish Rebellion of 1641 (illustrated ed.). McGill-Queen's Press - MQUP. p. 75. ISBN 0-7735-1157-1.

Parliament of Ireland
Preceded by Nathaniel Catelyn; Richard Barry	Member of Parliament for Dublin; 1639–1649; With: Richard Barry	Succeeded by Commonwealth of England, Scotland and Ireland
Parliament of England
Preceded by John Hewson	Member of Parliament for County Dublin; 1656–1658	Succeeded by Sir Theophilus Jones
Legal offices
Preceded by Sir Nathaniel Catelyn	Recorder of Dublin; 1634–1660	Succeeded by Sir William Davys
Preceded by Miles Corbet	Chief Baron of the Irish Exchequer; 1660–1680	Succeeded by Henry Hene
