= Sir Richard Bulkeley, 2nd Baronet =

Irish politician (1660–1710)

Sir Richard Bulkeley, 2nd Baronet FRS (17 August 1660 – 7 April 1710) was an Irish politician and baronet.

He was the elder son of Sir Richard Bulkeley, 1st Baronet and his first wife Catherine Bysse, daughter of John Bysse, sometime Chief Baron of the Irish Exchequer and his wife Margaret Edgeworth. Bulkeley was educated at Trinity College, Dublin and Christ Church, Oxford, graduating from both with a Bachelor of Arts in 1680. In the following year, he became a Fellow of Trinity College and received a Master of Arts in 1682. Bulkeley was appointed a Fellow of the Royal Society in 1685. In the same year he succeeded his father as baronet Bulkeley of Old Bawn, in the County of Dublin, and of Dunlaven, in the County of Wicklow; however he was attainted by the Irish Parliament after the Glorious Revolution of 1689. Three years later Bulkeley entered the Irish House of Commons for Fethard (County Wexford), representing the constituency until his death in 1710.

On 16 February 1685, he married Lucy Downing, daughter of the eminent statesman and financier Sir George Downing, 1st Baronet at Westminster Abbey. Their only son died an infant. Bulkeley died in 1710 and was buried at Ewell. With his death the baronetcy became extinct. Richards's widow remarried William Worth, of the Court of Exchequer (Ireland). Lucy had been Worth's fourth wife, Worth's third wife had been Richard's stepmother, Dorothy Whitfield. Lucy died only two years after her first husband, Richard Bulkeley. Sir Richard's estates passed to his niece Hester, who married Lucy's stepson James Worth Tynte.

Parliament of Ireland
Preceded by Patriot Parliament	Member of Parliament for Fethard (County Wexford); 1692 – 1710; With: Dudley Loftus 1692–1695; Sir Nicholas Loftus 1695–1703; Thomas Palliser 1703–1710	Succeeded by Nicholas Loftus; Thomas Palliser
Baronetage of Ireland
Preceded by Richard Bulkeley	Baronet (of Old Bawn and Dunlaven); 1685 – 1710	Extinct
