= William Halsey (judge) =

Irish politician, soldier and judge

William Halsey (died after 1672) was a politician, soldier and judge in seventeenth-century Ireland. He was Mayor of Waterford, a member of each of the three Protectorate Parliaments, and the last Chief Justice of Munster.

== Biography ==
Little seems to be known of his origins or his early life: he developed close links with the city of Waterford, but apparently only in adult life. He is first heard of as a captain in the Cromwellian Army. After the triumph of the Cromwellian cause in Ireland in 1650–51 he was awarded several confiscated Royalist estates, although his right to the former Esmonde lands in Wexford was disputed. He became a substantial landowner in County Tipperary and County Kilkenny; later he moved to Waterford. He became prominent in the public life of Waterford city, and served as its Mayor in 1661-2. As Mayor, he is on record as having conducted an inquiry in 1661 into the condition of the city Lazar house (leper house).

He was almost certainly a qualified barrister, and served in several judicial and quasi-judicial offices. The Provincial Court of Munster, which had lapsed during the political turmoil of the 1640s, was briefly revived with the regicide John Cook as Chief Justice and Halsey as second justice. He sat with Cook on a special court at Mallow to hear pleas against their proposed removal to Connacht by citizens of Cork, Youghal and Kinsale, and in 1656 he sat on the special court which sat at Athlone to hear similar pleas. He was commissioner for revenue for the district of Waterford. In 1655 he was appointed to the Commission for the Peace for County Wexford. He acted as Clerk of the Crown and Hanaper in the Four Courts, although the office had already been granted to George Carleton. After a struggle Halsey was persuaded to give up the office of Clerk. In 1653 he was accused of unlawfully seizing lands at Lymbricke, County Wexford, the property of the Esmonde family, to which he had a "pretended claim" in right of his wife (this information is one of the very few facts which we have concerning Mrs. Halsey).

He sat in each of the three Protectorate Parliaments as a member of the newly combined constituency of the Cities of Waterford and Clonmel. He was one of the "Kinglings" i.e. the party in Parliament which unsuccessfully urged Oliver Cromwell to accept the English Crown in 1657.

Given his record of unswerving loyalty to Cromwell, and in particular his involvement in the efforts to persuade Cromwell to accept the Crown, it is remarkable that his career continued to flourish after the Restoration of Charles II. Despite attacks on his loyalty to the Crown by his political enemies, and complaints about his less than scrupulous manner of acquiring Royalist property, he seems to have been generally regarded as a man of integrity. This may partly account for his survival and continuing prosperity: in any case Charles II in the early years of his reign adopted a conscious policy of reconciliation with his former enemies. Halsey also enjoyed the patronage of Roger Boyle, 1st Earl of Orrery, the new Lord President of Munster, whose family were the dominant political force in Munster.

In addition to being Mayor of Waterford, he returned to the Provincial Court of Munster as Chief Justice and remained in that office until the Court was abolished in 1672. His date of death is not recorded. He was married: his wife appears to have been a connection of the Esmonde family.

== Sources ==
- Barnard, T.C. Cromwellian Ireland – English Government and Reform in Ireland 1649–1660 Oxford University Press 1975
- Burke, William P. History of Clonmel 1907 Reprinted Robertes Books Kilkenny 1982
- Clarke, Aidan Prelude to Restoration in Ireland – the end of the Commonwealth 1659–1660 Cambridge University Press 2004
- 1641 Depositions-Information of Richard Shorthall Trinity College Dublin
- Patentee Officers in Ireland 1173–1826 Irish Manuscripts Commission
