= William Henn =

Irish judge (c.1720–1796)

- Henn in 1793
- Born: 1720; Clare, Ireland
- Died: 1796 (aged 75–76); Dublin, Ireland
- Education: University of Dublin
- Occupation: Judge
- Spouse: Elizabeth Parry

William Henn (c. 1720 – 1796) was an Irish judge, who is remembered now mainly for the somewhat malicious description of him in Sir Jonah Barrington's Personal Sketches.

== Life ==
He was born at Ballynacally, County Clare, second son of Thomas Henn of Paradise Hill. The Henn family, who were originally from London, had acquired large estates in Clare in the 17th century. They had a long association with the law: Henry Hene, or Henn, who is generally thought to have been William's direct ancestor, was Chief Baron of the Irish Exchequer 1680–1687. John Bennett, William's colleague on the Court of King's Bench, was a cousin.

William entered Middle Temple in 1738, took his degree as Bachelor of Arts from Trinity College Dublin in 1740, was called to the Irish Bar in 1744 and became King's Counsel in 1762. He was made a justice of the Court of King's Bench (Ireland) in 1768 and remained on the Bench until 1791. He died in Dublin in 1796.

== Reputation ==
Jonah Barrington called him a "very excellent private character" but did not rate his judicial qualities at all highly. According to Barrington, Henn was "dreadfully puzzled" when he was hearing a case while on assize at Wexford in about 1789 by the arguments of two young barristers, each of whom pleaded with great eloquence that the law was in his client's favour. Having argued their contradictory positions at length, they requested the judge to give his ruling. Henn, at a loss to know which side was in the right, whispered to his registrar: "I wish to God I knew what the law really was!", to which the registrar replied that if he knew what the law was, he would happily share his knowledge with the judge.

John Scott, 1st Earl of Clonmell, who presided in the King's Bench where Henn was a junior judge, had a very low opinion of him, calling him "at best a fool". Admittedly Scott in his diary privately expressed his contempt for nearly all the Irish judges of his time, including some with whom he was outwardly friendly: Henn's cousin John Bennett was one whom Scott saw as his particular enemy.

== Family ==
William's granddaughter Mary Henn and her husband John Stanford

William Henn married Elizabeth Parry, of whose parents and family background little seems to be known; he was the father of three daughters and one son, William Henn junior, a Master in Chancery. The younger William married Susaana Lovett, sister of Sir Jonathan Lovett, 1st Baronet, of Liscombe House, Buckinghamshire, and had six children, including Jonathan Henn, a barrister, who is best remembered for prosecuting John Mitchel. Sir Charles Villiers Stanford, the famous conductor and composer, was his descendant in the next generation, the son of Jonathan's sister Mary "a lady of great charm and good manners", who married John James Stanford.
