= William Darrach Halsey =

American encyclopedist and lexicographer

William Darrach Halsey is an American encyclopedist and lexicographer. He is chiefly noted for his work on Collier's Encyclopedia, but was also lead editor of a number of other encyclopaedias and dictionaries.

== Bibliography ==
- Collier's Encyclopedia With Bibliography and Index (with Bernard Johnston)
- Macmillan dictionary for children (with Christopher G Morris)
- Merit Students Encyclopedia
