= Edward Worth (politician) =

Irish politician, physician and book collector

- Born: c. 1678
- Died: 2 March 1733; Dublin
- Resting place: St Patrick's Cathedral, Dublin
- Known for: Physician and bibliophile
- Father: John Worth

Edward Worth, FRS, (1678 – 2 March 1733) was an Irish politician, physician and book collector.

He was born into a prosperous Church of Ireland family, his father being John Worth (1648–1688), Dean of St Patrick's Cathedral, Dublin, who was a younger son of Edward Worth (1620–1669), Bishop of Killaloe and his wife Susannah Pepper. His father's eldest brother William Worth was an eminent judge. Edward's mother was named Comfort: she died in 1681. Edward was one of about ten children but only he and his brother Michael reached adulthood.

Worth studied medicine in Oxford (matriculated 1693), Leiden and Utrecht (MD 1701) before practising as a doctor in Dublin. A financial windfall from his uncle William helped him to establish a large book collection, bought from places such as London, the Netherlands, France and Dublin, in addition to those he had inherited from his father and grandfather. On his death the collection consisted of some 4,400 books, many on medicine, dating back in some cases to the fifteenth century. Worth left his library, then valued at £5,000, to Dr Steevens' Hospital in Kilmainham, of which he was a governor. The hospital built a special room to house the books, which remain there today. According to a 2008 Irish Times article, the books have been stored well and are in remarkably good condition.

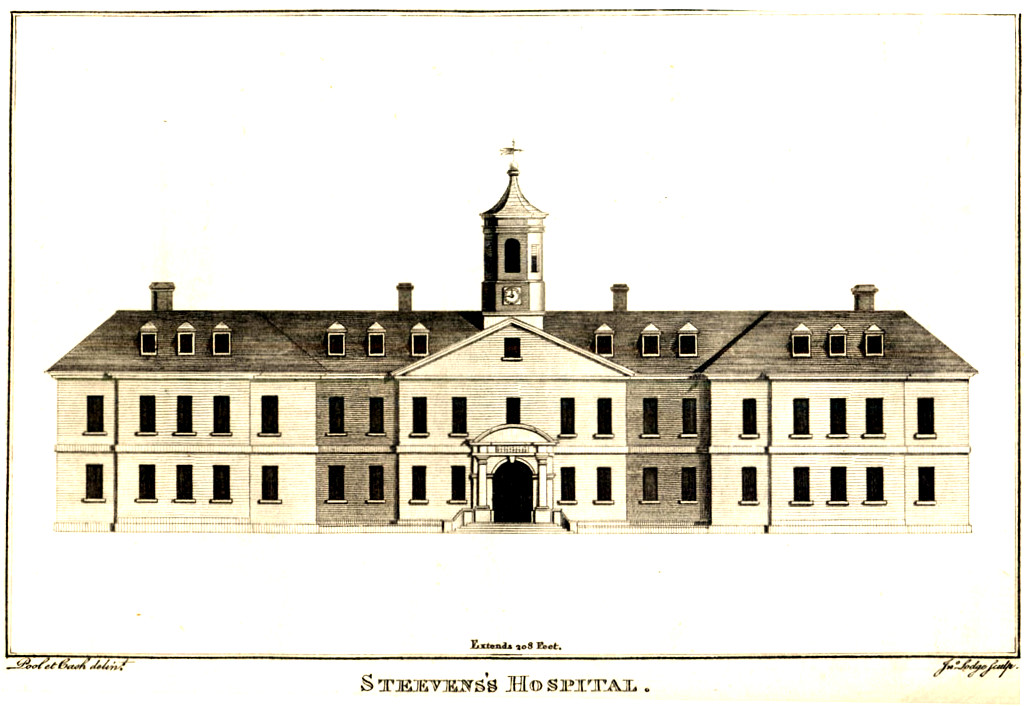
Dr Steevens' Hospital, which houses the Worth Library

Edward Worth was an important figure in the Dublin of his day. He was a friend and contemporary of such people as Jonathan Swift, and his library is remarkable, not only for its size and variety, but also for the condition of the books, some of which are hundreds of years old but appear almost new. Between 1695 and 1715 Worth sat in the Irish House of Commons for Knocktopher and then between 1715 and 1727 for New Ross.

He was elected a Fellow of the Royal Society in January 1699.

Malicious gossip said that he was a very heavy drinker, especially in his last years." A perfect sot... put to bed drunk three times a day" was one comment after his death.

He is buried in the family tomb in St Patrick's Cathedral, Dublin.

Parliament of Ireland
Preceded by Edward Jones; Jeffrey Paul	Member of Parliament for New Ross; 1715–1727; With: Thomas Meredyth	Succeeded by Charles Tottenham; John Leigh
