= Hene baronets =

Extinct baronetcy in the Baronetage of England

The Henn, later Hene Baronetcy, of Winkfield in the County of Berkshire, was a title in the Baronetage of England. It was created on 1 October 1642 for Henry Henn. The second and subsequent Baronets used the surname Hene. The title became extinct on the death of the fourth Baronet.

The family claimed descent from the South Wales gentry, from where the first baronet's grandfather had moved to Surrey. Their descent being uncertain, in 1642 they were granted a new coat of arms by Sir John Borough, Garter Principal King of Arms. In 1664 Elias Ashmole recorded that the 1st baronet was the second son of William Henn of Dorking, Surrey and Anne Burch of Coleshill. He married Dorothy, the daughter of Henry Stapleford (d. 1631) of St Paul's Walden, Hertfordshire. In 1630, he paid £3,400 for the grant of the manor of Foliejon Park in Winkfield.

== Henn, later Hene baronets, of Winkfield (1642) ==
- Sir Henry Henn, 1st Baronet (c. 1577 – c. 1668)
- Sir Henry Hene, 2nd Baronet (c. 1632 – c. 1675)
- Sir Henry Hene, 3rd Baronet (1651–1705)
- Sir Richard Hene, 4th Baronet (c. 1675 – c. 1710)
