= John Worth (priest) =

Irish Anglican Dean (1648–1688)

John Worth, B.D. (1648-1688) was an Irish Anglican Dean.

The son of Bishop Edward Worth, and Susannah Pepper, daughter of Denis Pepper, a cousin of the Earl of Cork, and brother of the noted judge William Worth, he was educated at Trinity College, Dublin. He was appointed a prebendary of Killaloe in 1670; Chancellor of St. Patrick's Cathedral, Dublin in 1671; Dean of Kildare in 1675; and Dean of St. Patrick's Cathedral, Dublin in 1678. He died on 12 April 1688.

Religious differences played a large part in his own early life. His father was a Protestant of strongly Puritan leanings, with no sympathy for either Baptists or Quakers. His mother on the other hand was a Quaker who was arrested in 1664 for publicly attending Quaker meetings. This caused a breach between the couple which was never healed: in his last will his father urged his mother to repent for her unorthodox beliefs.

His wife's first name was Comfort: they had ten children. Only two are known to have survived into adulthood, Michael and Edward Worth (1678-1733), the noted physician and book collector.
