= Edward Worth (bishop) =

Edward Worth (c. 1620–2 August 1669) was a Church of Ireland Bishop of Killaloe, who is mainly remembered now as the founder of the Blue Coat School for the poor boys of Cork. In his own lifetime, he was known as an adroit political player, who skilfully negotiated his way through the turbulent world of seventeenth-century Irish politics, although he ended not in a position of great influence but as holder of a rather insignificant bishopric.

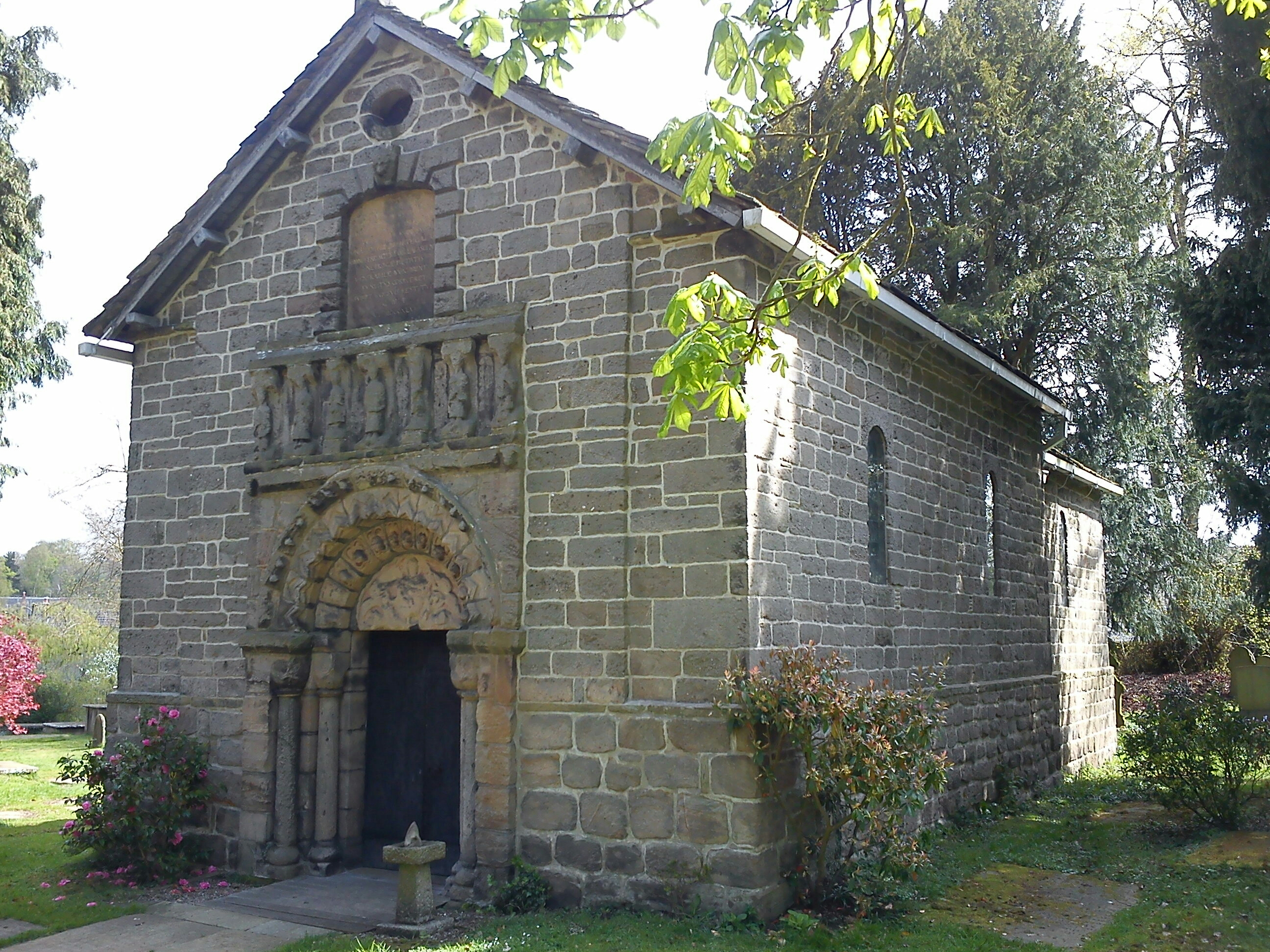
Chapel in Prestbury, Cheshire, where the Worth family originated

He was born in Newmarket, County Cork, the son of James Worth, a clergyman; his grandfather Jasper Worth came to Ireland from Prestbury, Cheshire, where the family had lived for several centuries. He entered Trinity College Dublin in 1638 and was awarded a Doctor of Divinity (D.D.).

== Career ==
He obtained a small living at Ringrone, near Kinsale, in 1641. He was appointed Dean of Cork in 1645, without the sanction of the Bishop of Cork but with the support of the Cathedral chapter, who resisted the Bishop's efforts to install Henry Hall (who eventually became Bishop of Killala and Achonry) in his place. During the confusion of the late 1640s and 1650s, his deanery was abolished, but he was compensated with several other livings. During the British Interregnum, he remained in Cork, where he set up a local association which he hoped might become the model for a national Church.

During the political and religious conflicts of the 1640s and 1650s, Worth was described as "an adroit political player", who easily made his peace with the new regime, and enjoyed the personal regard of Henry Cromwell, but emerged at the Restoration of Charles II with his reputation for loyalty to the English Crown more or less intact. He was raised to the episcopacy as Bishop of Killaloe in 1660 by Letters Patent of King Charles II. He was consecrated in St Patrick's Cathedral, Dublin on 27 January 1661.

Killaloe was a small and rather obscure diocese, and Worth as a bishop had nothing like the influence he had enjoyed in the late 1650s, when he had worked closely with Henry Cromwell in an effort to forge a new religious settlement and create a national church. His friendship with Cromwell was held against him by many staunch Royalists, who greeted his translation to the Episcopal bench without enthusiasm. Quite unfairly his wife's non-conforming beliefs were taken as a sign that Worth himself had similar leanings.

He died in Hackney, London, in 1669 and was buried in St. Mildred's Church, Bread Street, London. The church was destroyed in the Blitz.

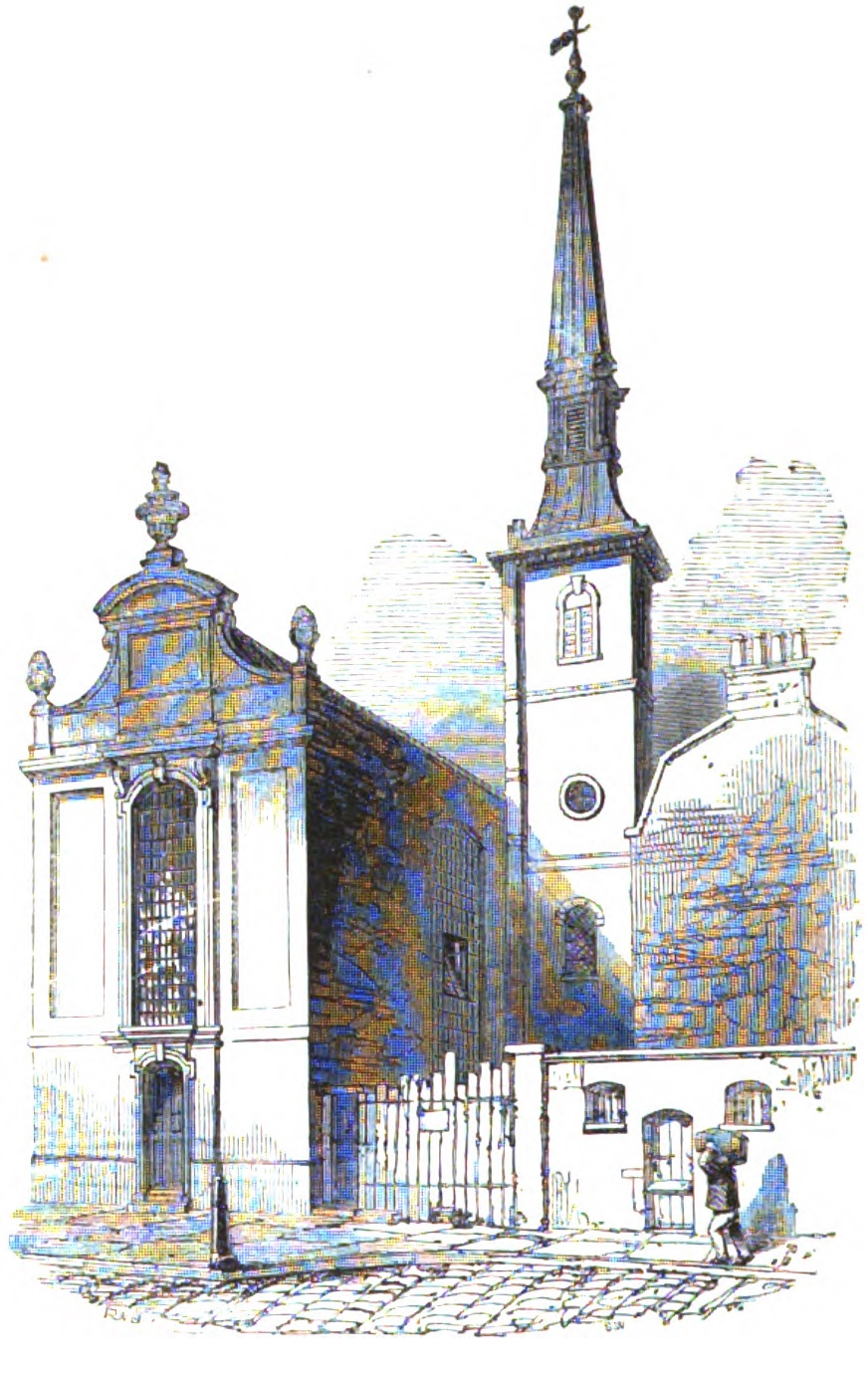
St. Mildred's Church, Bread Street, where Worth was buried.

== Family ==
He married Susannah Pepper, daughter of Dennis Pepper, and sister of Captain George Pepper of Ballygarth House, County Meath. The Peppers were relatives of the Earl of Cork, whose family acted as Edward's patrons. The marriage was a troubled one: Susannah became a Quaker in 1656, and was arrested for attending a Quaker meeting in Dublin in 1664. Her husband, by contrast, had always been noted for his intolerance of Baptists and Quakers. Susannah's conversion led to an estrangement between the couple which was never made up, as shown by the fact that her husband in his last will urged her sternly to consider "how she had fallen", and exhorted her to "perform her first act" (i.e. of repentance).

They had fours sons:

- William Worth (c.1646–1721), barrister and judge, who held office as Recorder of Cork and Baron of the Court of Exchequer (Ireland),
- Edward Worth junior, a doctor,
- Michael, who seems to have died young,
- John Worth (1648–1688), Dean of St Patrick's Cathedral, who was the father of:
  - Edward Worth, the noted politician, physician and book collector.

They also had a daughter Susannah, who married Captain Epinetus Cross, High Sheriff of County Cork: their granddaughter, Susannah Griffith, was the mother of John Wandesford, 1st Earl Wandesford.

He had some reputation as a book collector, and his books probably formed the nucleus of the remarkable collection of his grandson, Edward Worth the third, which still exists, and is housed in Dr Steevens' Hospital.

He was a rich man, who left substantial lands to his sons, and money to found St Stephen's Hospital in Cork, popularly known as the Blue Coat School for poor boys, for which act of benevolence he is now mainly remembered.
