= Chief Justice of Munster =

The chief justice of Munster was the senior of the two judges who assisted the Lord President of Munster in judicial matters. Despite his title of Chief Justice, full judicial authority was vested in the lord president, who had "power to hear and determine at his discretion all manner of complaints in any part of the province of Munster", and also had powers to hold commissions of oyer and terminer and jail delivery (clearing out of prisoners).

== Role of the chief justice of Munster ==
The hearing of judicial business in the province of Munster was delegated by the lord president to the chief justice and the second justice, who were members of the lord president's council and travelled with him on assize. In 1600 Queen Elizabeth I issued an order that both justices must always be in attendance on the lord president, unless he gave them special leave of absence. In the court's earlier years, it seems that there was no central judicial seat: the court could be convened wherever the president thought it necessary.

Due to the chronic disturbances in Elizabethan Munster, going on circuit could be a hazardous experience: there was a serious riot during the assizes at Tralee in 1579 in which several Court officials were killed. In 1601–02, during the political crisis caused by the Battle of Kinsale, the lord president's court temporarily assumed the powers of the courts of common law. In 1620, Luke Gernon, the second justice of the court, recorded that "when the President goeth forth, he is attended in military form, when he rideth, by a troop of horse (cavalry), when he walketh by a company of foot (infantry) with pikes and muskets".

The wide powers given to the president's court led to clashes with the long-established courts, especially the Court of Chancery (Ireland). In 1622 an official instruction was issued to the Court of Munster, and its fellow court in Connacht, not to "intermeddle" with cases which were clearly within the jurisdiction of another court.

By 1620, according to Luke Gernon, the second justice of Munster, the Court had established a permanent seat in Limerick, where it held its sessions in King John's Castle. In his interesting manuscript, A Discourse of Ireland 1620, Gernon states that the Court was modelled on the Council of Wales and the Marches, with "a President, two justices and a council. We sit in council at a table".

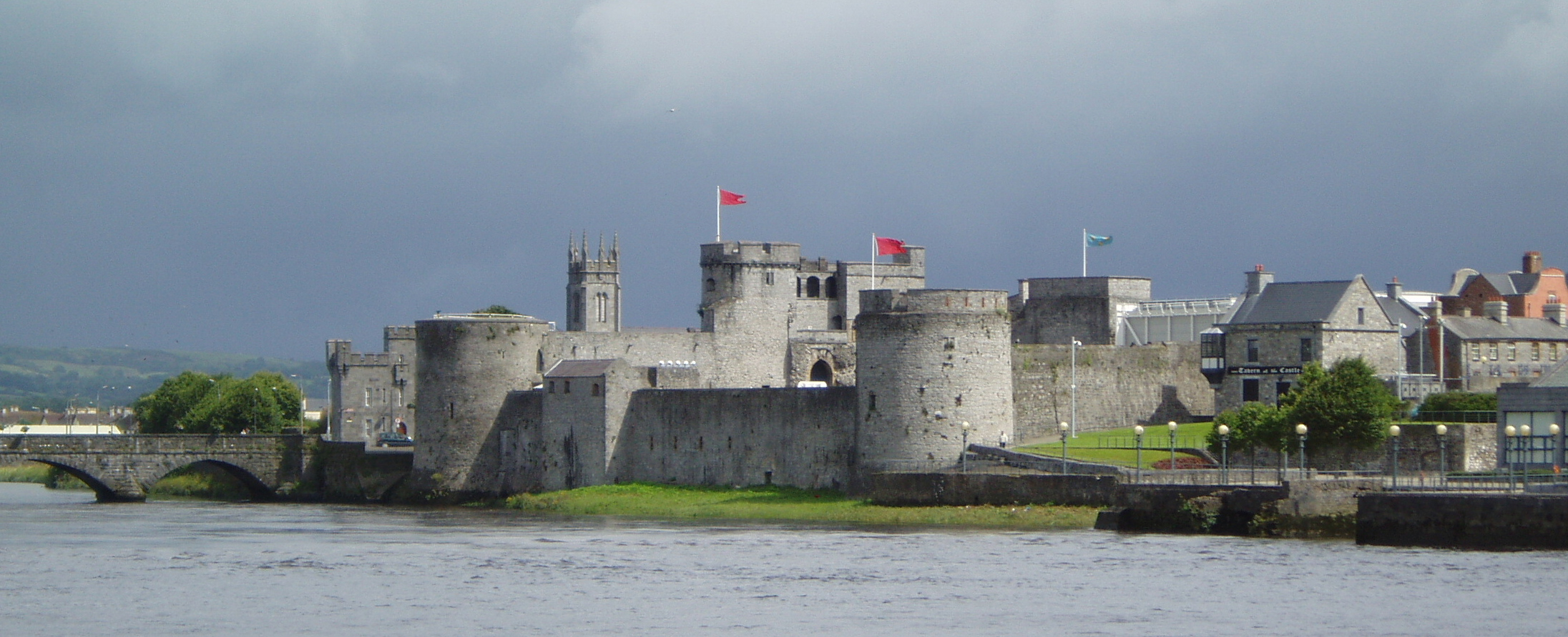
King John's Castle, seat of the Court of the Lord President of Munster

The office of Chief Justice of Munster was an onerous one, and it was generally considered inadvisable to combine it with any other senior judicial position. William Saxey aroused much indignation in 1599 when he refused to resign as Chief Justice on being appointed a justice of the Court of King's Bench (Ireland), which was considered the more improper since he never sat in the latter Court, and increasingly neglected his duties in Munster as well. On the other hand, it was understood that the office holder could expect to be promoted in due course to one of the courts of common law or even become its chief justice, as James Dowdall, Sir Nicholas Walsh and Lord Sarsfield did.

An exception to the general rule against holding two judicial offices at once seems to have been made for Gerald Comerford, who was appointed both Chief Justice of Munster and a Baron of the Court of Exchequer (Ireland) shortly before his death in 1604. This was probably in consideration of his 20 years of loyal service to the Crown: his lack of a proper reward for his long and loyal service was a subject about which he had complained frequently over the years. He was also Attorney General for Connacht, an office he held for life.

There was apparently no objection to the chief justice holding a purely local judicial office at the same time, or sitting in Parliament: Henry Gosnold, through much of his long career, was also the admiralty judge for Munster. This was at the time the only local division of the Irish Admiralty Court: the judge in Munster was a deputy to the Lord Chancellor of Ireland, who was generally ex officio the Irish admiralty judge. Sir Richard Aylward sat in the Parliament of 1585–6 while also serving as second justice of Munster, and John Meade, who sat in two Elizabethan parliaments, had also been Second Justice and Recorder of Cork.

== Attorney General for Munster ==
The court also had its own attorney general: the last known attorney was Henry Bathurst (died 1676), later Recorder of Cork. Among the most eminent holders of this office were:

- Henry Gosnold;
- Dominick, Viscount Sarsfield;
- Richard Becon, a leading figure in the Plantation of Munster, and author of the influential pamphlet Solon his follie, on the misgovernment of Ireland, published in 1594;
- Sir Lawrence Parsons, who in a varied career served as MP for Tallow, Recorder of Youghal, Judge of the Irish Court of Admiralty and Baron of the Court of Exchequer (Ireland). He was the ancestor of the Earl of Rosse of the second creation;
- Sir Gerard Lowther, who was Parsons's son-in-law and had a very similar career, being also a Baron of the Exchequer;
- Henry Bathurst, a member of a noted English Royalist family.

== Civil War and Restoration ==
During the disturbances of the English Civil War the office of Chief Justice lapsed, although Henry Gosnold, who had been appointed to the office in 1624, reached a great age and may still have been alive in 1658.

It was briefly revived for the regicide John Cook, who in 1655 abolished the provincial court and replaced it with a number of county courts. William Halsey served under the Cromwellian regime in a number of capacities, including Mayor of Waterford and second justice of Munster. In the 1650s the Court seems to have been based in Mallow. Henry Bathurst's tenure as Attorney-General seems to cover the years 1653–55.

The office was revived at the Restoration: surprisingly, the new chief justice was William Halsey, despite his record of loyal service to Oliver Cromwell. This was said to be a tribute to the high regard in which he was held, although his enemies were quick to accuse him of disloyalty to the Crown. He was to be the last holder of the office, which was abolished in 1672.

== List of chief justices of Munster (1569–1672) ==
- George Walshe 1569
- James Dowdall 1570
- Sir Nicholas Walsh 1576
- Jesse Smythes 1584
- William Saxey 1594
- Gerald Comerford c.1603
- Dominick Sarsfield, 1st Viscount Sarsfield 1604 or 1605
- Edward Harris 1608
- Henry Gosnold, or Gosnell 1624

Interregnum

- John Cook 1650
- William Halsey 1660.

Office abolished 1672

== List of second justices of Munster ==
Incomplete list

- Nicholas Walsh: he was appointed second justice of Munster on the establishment of the Presidency in 1569, and promoted to Chief Justice of Munster in 1576.
- John Meagh, Meade or Myarh: he was the first known Recorder of Cork, appointed to that office between 1570 and 1574, and was subsequently Second Justice of Munster. He was a barrister of Lincoln's Inn. He sat in the Irish House of Commons as member for Cork City in the Parliaments of 1559 and 1585. He was the ancestor of the Meade Baronets of Ballintubber and the Earl of Clanwilliam.
- Sir Richard Aylward, who succeeded Walsh as second justice in 1576. He belonged to the prominent Aylward family of Faithlegg, County Waterford. Like his father Peter Aylward, he was an MP, sitting in the Irish House of Commons in the Parliament of 1585-6 as MP for County Waterford. He became a member of the Council of the King's Inns c.1607. He died after 1610 and was succeeded in his estates by his brother Peter.
- James Gould or Goold: he was second justice of Munster when William Saxey was Chief Justice, despite objections to his qualifications, since he was Irish-born. He probably belonged to a well-known Limerick family. During the Nine Years War (1593-1603) he wrote regular, despondent letters to the English Government, concerning the state of English rule in Ireland. During the serious disturbances in Munster in 1598, he was described as being "utterly forsaken". In 1600 Queen Elizabeth I ordered that Gould and Saxey were to remain in constant attendance on the Lord President of Munster "being of special trust appointed to his Council".
- James Osborne (early 1600s?): little seems to be known of him except that he had a daughter, Katherine (died 1615), the first wife of Sir George Sexton of Limerick (died 1631), Secretary to the Lord Deputy of Ireland.
- Luke Gernon: an Englishman by birth, he was appointed second justice of Munster in 1619. He is now remembered chiefly for his manuscript (probably a private letter) Discourse of Ireland (1620), which gives some useful details about the President's court as well as a vivid picture of the city of Limerick. He was still alive at the Restoration, when he received a pension, and died at a great age about 1672.
- William Halsey: he served as second justice under the Cromwellian regime, and became the last Chief Justice of Munster in 1660.
- John Nayler of Gray's Inn: he was second justice of Munster 1660–1666.
- Sir Standish Hartstonge, 1st Baronet: he was the last second justice of Munster, and later served two terms as Baron of the Court of Exchequer (Ireland).

Office abolished 1672

== List of attorneys general for Munster ==
Incomplete

- Richard Becon, 1586-1591
- Henry Gosnold 1596-1600
- Dominic Sarsfield, 1st Viscount Sarsfield 1600-1604/5
- Sir Lawrence Parsons 1612-1621
- Sir Gerard Lowther 1621-1623
- Henry Bathurst c. 1653-55, later Recorder of Cork and Kinsale

Office abolished 1672
