= Recorder of Cork =

The recorder of Cork was a judicial office holder in pre-Independence Ireland. The recorder was the chief magistrate of Cork city: his principal duty was to keep the peace. The office was very similar to that of the recorder of Dublin, except that the recorder of Cork, unlike his Dublin counterpart, did not have the power to preside over any trial involving a capital crime. A statute of 1877 stated that wherever possible the recorder should also be the Chairman of the Cork East Riding Quarter Sessions. The office of the recorder of Cork, like the recorder of Dublin, was an onerous one, involving at least two sittings of the Court every week; as a rule, the recorder had a deputy recorder to assist him. William Waggett, appointed in 1808, delegated all his duties to his Deputy Mr. Wilmot until the latter died in 1815.

As with the recordership of Dublin, the recordership of Cork could be combined with another legal office, such as that of King's Serjeant-at-law. Several recorders of Cork also served in the Irish House of Commons. The recorder might hold another local office such as Collector of Customs for the Port of Cork. Like the recorder of Dublin, he was elected by the City Corporation, rather than being appointed by the English Crown. At least two recorders of Cork, Henry Bathurst and William Worth, also served as Recorder of Kinsale in the 1660 and 1670s.

The first known reference to the office of Recorder of Cork is in a charter of Queen Elizabeth I in 1574, requiring the Recorder (John Meade or Meagh) to act as a "keeper of the peace", justice of oyer and terminer, and justice of gaol delivery.

Hansard (the official journal of the British House of Commons) records an interesting occurrence in 1906 when Mr Tristram Curry, registrar to the recorder, fled from Cork, having embezzled several thousand pounds of suitors funds lodged in Court.

The office of Recorder of Cork was abolished, along with all other recorderships in the Irish Free State, in 1924.

== Notable recorders ==
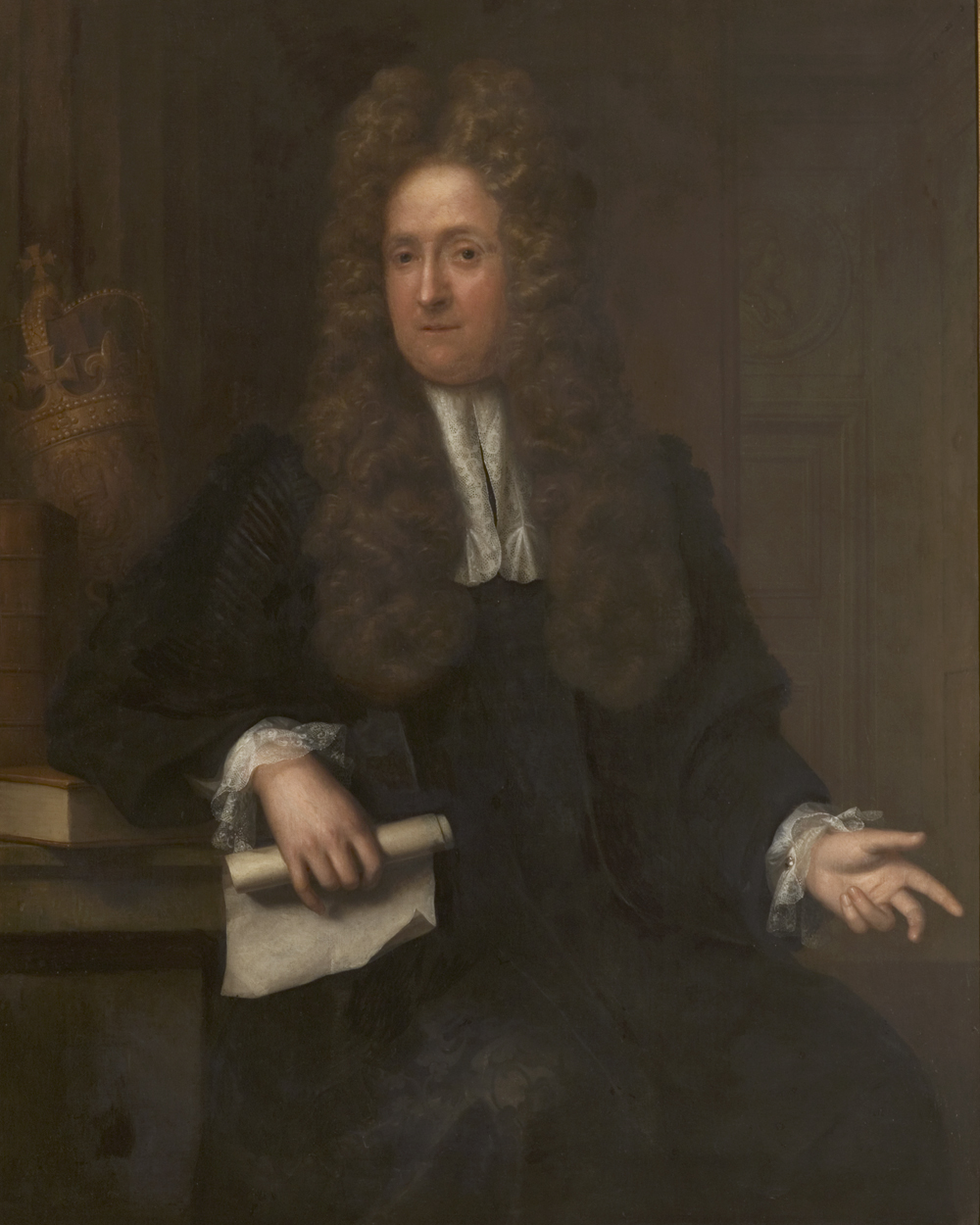
Alan Brodrick, 1st Viscount Midleton c.1717

Notable recorders of Cork have included:

- John Meade, Meagh or Myarh (living 1574), the first known Recorder, and later Second Justice of the Provincial Court of Munster. He also sat in the Irish House of Commons as the member for Cork City in the Parliaments of 1559 and 1585. He was a barrister of Lincoln's Inn. He was the ancestor of the Meade Baronets of Ballintubber and the Earl of Clanwilliam.
- William Meade (died after 1611), was probably a cousin of John Meade. He refused to proclaim the new King James I of England in 1603, and as a result, he was tried for treason, but acquitted. He later fled from Ireland, presumably to avoid further charges of treason being brought against him, and died in exile in Italy.
- Henry Bathurst (1623-1676), one of the sixteen sons of George Bathurst and Elizabeth Villiers of Theddingworth, Leicestershire, and brother of the politician Sir Benjamin Bathurst, and of Dr Ralph Bathurst, Dean of Wells. He was also Recorder of Kinsale
- William Worth (c.1646–1721), who was a member of a leading clerical family – his father was Edward Worth, Bishop of Killaloe, and his brother John was Dean of St Patrick's Cathedral, Dublin. He was Recorder of Kinsale 1676-1681, Recorder of Cork 1678–81 and later one of the Barons of the Court of Exchequer (Ireland) (1681-1689).
- Alan Brodrick, 1st Viscount Midleton (c.1656–1728), Recorder 1690–1695, one of the leading Irish judges and statesmen of his time, whose numerous public offices included Speaker of the Irish House of Commons and Lord Chancellor of Ireland. He was notoriously bad-tempered.
- Hugh Dickson MP (died 1738) who sat in the Irish House of Commons as the member for Cork city 1725–35 and was Recorder 1728–1738 and Controller of Customs. He married Anne Hoare, sister of Edward Hoare; their father had founded Hoare's Bank.
- Hugh Carleton, 1st Viscount Carleton (1739-1826), Recorder from 1769 to 1779, was a member of one of Cork's leading merchant families. He was a rather unsuccessful politician, but became a distinguished judge, who held office as Chief Justice of the Irish Common Pleas.
- John Bennett (c. 1720-1792), Recorder c. 1783-7, a prominent local politician, member of the Irish House of Commons, and later justice of the Court of King's Bench (Ireland).
- Robert Bennett, Recorder 1841-1847, (mentioned as Deputy Recorder in 1840), who kept a valuable notebook of the cases he heard between 1841 and 1843. He was the father of the noted surgeon Edward Hallaran Bennett, who identified Bennett's fracture.
- William Waggett (1771-1840), Recorder 1808–1841: he was one of the most eminent Irish barristers of his age, but was also noted for eccentricity. He was the son of Christopher Waggett (died 1796) of Kitsborough House.
- Matthew Bourke (1849–1926), the last Recorder of Cork (1908–1924), who was described with great affection by his friend Maurice Healy in his memoir The Old Munster Circuit.

== List of recorders of Cork 1574–1924 (incomplete) ==
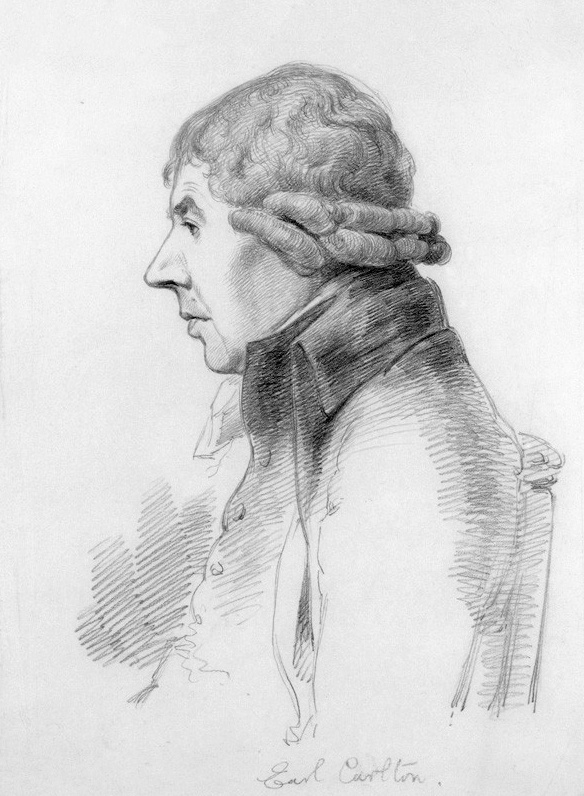
Hugh Carleton, 1st Viscount Carleton

- John Meagh, or Meade (c.1570-74)
- William Meade (removed from office 1603)
- Benjamin Crofts (c.1665–1668)
- Henry Bathurst (died 1676), former Attorney General for Munster; also Recorder of Kinsale
- William Worth (1678–1681)
- Alan Brodrick, 1st Viscount Midleton (1690–1695)
- Hugh Dickson (appointed December 1728, and still in office 1734); MP for Cork city 1727–35, Collector of Customs for the Port of Cork
- Joseph Bennett (1738- 1767)
- Hugh Carleton, 1st Viscount Carleton (1769–1779)
- John Bennett (c.1783–1787)
- William Waggett (1808–1840)
- Robert Bennett (1841–1847)
- Thomas Forsyth, or Forsayth (1847–1879)
- James Hamilton (1880–1892)
- Sir John Chute Neligan (1892–1908)
- Matthew Bourke (1908–1924)

=== Deputy Recorder of Cork ===
- Robert Wilmot (1772-1815), brother of the writers Katherine Wilmot and Martha Wilmot, was Deputy Recorder until his death in 1815
- Robert Bennett, Recorder 1841-1847, was described as Deputy Recorder in 1840.
