= List of Irish MPs 1639–1649 =

This is a list of members of the Irish House of Commons between 1639 and 1649. There were almost 300 MPs at a time in this period.

| Name | Constituency | Religion | Notes |
|---|---|---|---|
| Sir Jerome Alexander | Lifford | Protestant | |
| Nicholas Barnewall | County Dublin | Catholic | Later 1st Viscount Barnewall |
| Patrick Barnewall | Trim | | |
| Peregrine Banastre | Clonakilty | | |
| John Bellew | | | |
| Patrick Bellew | County Louth | | |
| Richard Bellings | Callan | Catholic | |
| Sir Henry Bingham | Castlebar | (Born in England, 1573) | |
| Sir Richard Blake | County Galway | Catholic | |
| Sir Valentine Blake | Galway | Catholic | |
| Robert Blennerhassett | Tralee | | |
| Sir John Borlase | Enniskillen | | |
| Sir John Borlase | Belturbet | | |
| Sir Ulick Bourke | County Galway | | |
| Joshua Boyle | Mallow | | |
| Geoffrey Browne | Athenry | Catholic | |
| Sir William Brownlow | County Armagh | Protestant | |
| Thomas Burke | County Mayo | Catholic | |
| Robert Byron | Augher | | |
| John Bysse | Charlemont | Protestant | |
| Robert Bysse | Drogheda | Protestant | |
| William Cadogan | County Monaghan | Protestant | |
| John Cairnes | Augher | | |
| Oliver Cashell | County Louth | | |
| Tobias Caulfeild | County Tyrone | Protestant | later 3rd Baron Caulfeild |
| Arthur Champion | Enniskillen | | |
| Arthur Chichester | County Antrim | | |
| John Chichester | Dungannon | | |
| William Cole | County Fermanagh | Protestant | |
| Sir Charles Coote | Queen's County | | |
| Charles Coote | County Leitrim | Protestant | later 1st Earl of Mountrath |
| Piers Crosby | Queen's County | Catholic | |
| Patrick D'Arcy | Navan | Catholic | |
| Paul Davys | County Donegal | | |
| Simon Digby | Philipstown | Protestant | |
| James Dillon | County Westmeath | Catholic | |
| Lucas Dillon | County Roscommon | | |
| Anthony Doppinge | Bandonbridge | | |
| Sir Maurice Eustace | Athy | Protestant | Speaker |
| Patrick Roche Fitz-Richard | Kinsale | | |
| Sir Edward Fitzharris | County Limerick | | |
| Mathew Forde | County Dublin | Protestant | 1642 |
| Faithful Fortescue | County Armagh | | |
| Patrick French | Wexford | | |
| James Galbraith | Strabane | | |
| William Gilbert | Trinity College | | |
| Sir Ralph Gore | County Donegal | | |
| Sir John Hume | County Fermanagh | | |
| Bryan Jones | Baltimore | | |
| Oliver Jones | Athlone | Catholic sympathies | |
| Sir Richard Kennedy | Kildare | | |
| Robert King | Boyle | | |
| William Kingsmill | Mallow | | |
| Henry Knyveton | Baltimore | | |
| Richard Lambart | Kilbeggan | | Later 2nd Earl of Cavan |
| Sir Roger Langford | County Antrim | | |
| Dr Dudley Loftus | Naas | | 1642–1648 |
| Sir Roebuck Lynch | Galway | | |
| Sir Donagh MacCarthy | County Cork | Catholic | 20 Feb 1641 Lord Muskerry |
| Philip Mainwaring | Carysfort | (Born in England, 1589) | |
| John Martin | Charlemont | Protestant | |
| James Montgomery | County Down | Protestant | |
| Henry Moore | Ardee | | later 1st Earl of Drogheda |
| Dermot O'Brien | County Clare | | |
| Donogh O'Brien | County Clare | | |
| Gordon O'Neill | County Tyrone | | |
| Sir Phelim O'Neill | Dungannon | Catholic | |
| Sir Richard Osborne | County Waterford | | |
| Sir Richard Osborne | Dungarvan | | |
| Sir William Parsons | County Wicklow | (Born in England, 1570) | |
| Nicholas Plunkett | Meath | Catholic | 1639-1641 |
| George Radcliffe | Sligo | Protestant | |
| Redmond Roche | County Cork | Catholic | Replaced Sir Donough MacCarty |
| Edward Rowley | Londonderry City | Protestant | |
| Sir William St Leger | County Cork | Protestant | |
| Sir William Sambach | Carrickfergus | (Born in England) | |
| Sir Francis Slingsby | Bandonbridge | | |
| Sir Robert Talbot | County Wicklow | | |
| John Taylor | Swords | | |
| Sir Robert Travers | Clonakilty | | |
| Sir Edward Trevor | County Down | Protestant | |
| Sir Hardress Waller | Askeaton | Protestant | |
| John Walsh | | Catholic | |
| Christopher Wandesford | Kildare | (Born in England, 1592) | |
| Sir James Ware | Trinity College | Protestant | |
