= James Travers =

Recipient of the Victoria Cross

- General James Travers
- Born: 6 October 1820; Cork, Ireland
- Died: 1 April 1884 (aged 63); Pallanza, Italy
- Burial place: Municipal Ossuary, Pallanza
- Relatives: Donald Macintyre VC (brother-in-law)
- Military career
- Allegiance: United Kingdom
- Branch: Bengal Army; British Indian Army
- Service years: 1838–1881
- Rank: General
- Commands: 2nd Bengal Native Infantry
- Conflicts: First Anglo-Afghan War; First Anglo-Sikh War; Indian Mutiny
- Awards: Victoria Cross; Order of the Bath

General James Travers VC CB (6 October 1820 – 1 April 1884) was an Irish recipient of the Victoria Cross, the highest and most prestigious award for gallantry in the face of the enemy that can be awarded to British and Commonwealth forces.

== Military background ==
James Travers was born and grew up in County Cork, where the first of his ancestors to be born there, Sir Robert Travers, was killed at the Battle of Knocknanuss in 1647.

Travers came from a distinguished Anglo-Irish military family, and all seven of his brothers (three of whom were killed in India) served in the armed forces. They were the sons of Major-General Sir Robert Travers KCMG, CB (1770–1834) of the 95th Rifle Brigade, who was one of six brothers who themselves all served in the military, and one of three to be knighted for their services, including Rear-Admiral Sir Eaton Stannard Travers, who engaged in battle upwards of one hundred times, and was mentioned in dispatches eight times for gallantry.

== Military career ==
James Travers was educated at Addiscombe Military Seminary. He received a commission in the Bengal infantry in June 1838 and arrived in Calcutta in January 1839. He served with the 57th native infantry at Barrackpore and then the 2nd Bengal Native Infantry at Firozpur. He served with this regiment in the First Anglo-Afghan War between 1841 and 1842, being mentioned in despatches for the action at Zamin-Dawar; was at the capture of Ghazni and the action at Maidan.

Travers was appointed adjutant to the Bhopal contingent in March 1843 and promoted to captain and brevet major in January 1846, to reflect his earlier Afghan service. He then took part in the First Anglo-Sikh War, where on 10 February 1846 he commanded a Gurkha battalion at the battle of Sobraon, for which he was mentioned in despatches. In March 1846 he was made second in command of the Bhopal contingent. In June 1854 he was promoted to lieutenant-colonel and in February 1856 was appointed commandant of the Bhopal contingent. In 1856, he commanded a force in the field against the rebel Sankar Singh, and was promoted colonel the same year.

After the outbreak of the Mutiny in 1857, he moved from Bhopal to Indore and assumed command of the forces there. On 1 July a mutiny broke out among local forces, in which thirty-nine people were massacred. Travers was a 36 years old Colonel in the 2nd Bengal Native Infantry, Bengal Army during the Indian Mutiny when the following deed led to his award of the Victoria Cross:

For a daring act of bravery, in July, 1857, when the Indore Presidency was suddenly attacked by Holkar's Troops, in having charged the guns with only five men to support him, and driven the Gunners from the guns, thereby creating a favourable diversion, which saved the lives of many persons, fugitives to the Residency. It is stated that Officers who were present considered that the effect of the charge was to enable many Europeans to escape from actual slaughter, and time was gained which enabled the faithful Bhopal Artillery to man their guns. Colonel Travers's horse was shot in three places, and his accoutrements were shot through in various parts. He commanded the Bhopal Levy.

After this action, the European troops, residents and their families, accompanied by loyal Indian troops, evacuated the Residency, and arrived at Sehore on 4 July 1857.

Travers returned to the 2nd Native Infantry in 1858. On 8 September 1860 he was appointed commandant of the Central India Horse. On 23 July 1865 he was promoted to major general and in August 1869 was given the command of the Meerut Division. He was promoted to lieutenant general in 1873, and general in 1877 and placed on the supernumerary list in 1881. Travers was made a Companion of the Order of the Bath (CB) in May 1873. In 1876 he wrote The Evacuation of Indore relating to his actions there during the Mutiny.

Travers died at Pallanza, Lake Maggiore, Italy, on 1 April 1884, aged 63. He was originally buried in the Old Cemetery in Pallanza then moved in about 1920 to the New Cemetery, before finally being interred in the Municipal Ossuary in the Cimitero di Pallanza in 1996. His resting place is unmarked.

On 19 November 1849 he married Mary Isabella Macintyre in Bengal, India. Mary died at Kilrock, Bridge of Allan in Scotland on 16 June 1933, aged 103. Her brother was General Donald Macintyre VC, while her elder sister married Doctor William Brydon, the sole survivor of the 1842 retreat from Kabul.

== The medal ==
Travers' medals are in private ownership.
