= Philip Mainwaring =

English politician

The Rt. Hon. Sir Philip Mainwaring, P.C. (I.) (1589 – 2 August 1661), was an English politician who sat in the House of Commons variously between 1625 and 1661.

Mainwaring was the seventh son of Randall Mainwaring, of Peover, Cheshire, and Margaret Fitton, daughter of Sir Edward Fitton of Gawsworth Old Hall and Ann Warburton. He was admitted at Gray's Inn on 14 March 1609, and matriculated at Cambridge from Brasenose College, Oxford, on 29 August 1610. He was awarded BA from Oxford in 1613 and entered Lincoln's Inn on 15 February 1614. In 1624 he was awarded an MA at Cambridge on the visit of King Charles.

Mainwaring was elected Member of Parliament for Boroughbridge in 1625 and 1626. He was elected MP for Derby in 1628 and sat until 1629 when King Charles decided to rule without parliament for eleven years.

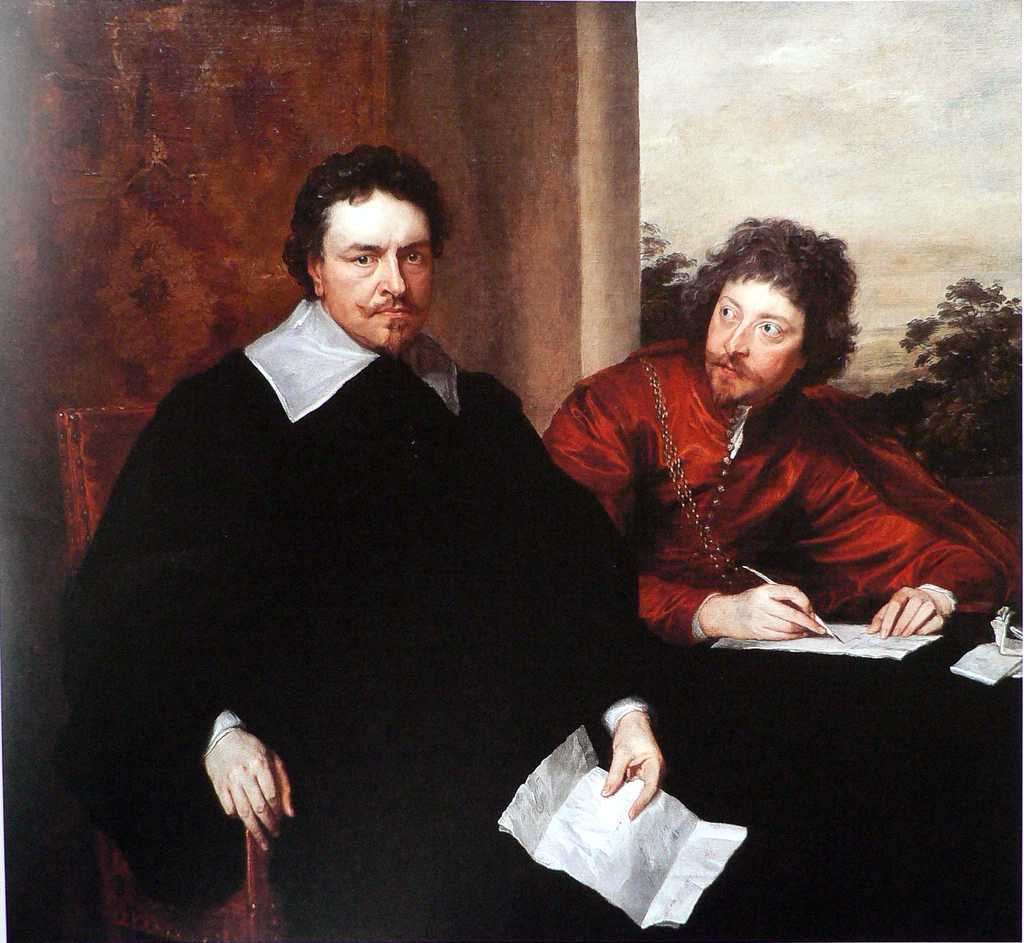
Van Dyck's double portrait of Sir Philip Mainwaring (right) with the 1st Earl of Strafford

In 1634, Mainwaring became Principal Secretary to the 1st Viscount Wentworth (who was later created, in January 1640, 1st Earl of Strafford), Lord Deputy of Ireland. Lord Wentworth's biographer refers to Mainwaring as a "court hanger-on" who was disliked by many of Wentworth's friends, but who had provided him with useful intelligence in the past, and who justified Wentworth's trust by proving a diligent and loyal official, who remained faithful to his employer to the end.

He was knighted at Dublin Castle on 13 July 1634. He was an MP in the Irish House of Commons for Clonakilty from 1634 to 1635 and for Carysfort from 1640 to 1641.

Mainwaring was elected MP for Morpeth for the Short Parliament in April 1640. He was imprisoned as a staunch Royalist in 1650.

After the Restoration of Charles II he applied unsuccessfully for the position of headmaster of Charterhouse School. In December 1660, Mainwaring was appointed to the Irish Privy Council. It was suggested that given his advanced years he should step down from his old office as Principal Secretary, but he held on firmly to his place. He was then elected MP for Newton in the Cavalier Parliament in 1661, but died later that year. He never married.

Parliament of England
Preceded by William Mainwaring; Sir Ferdinando Fairfax	Member of Parliament for Boroughbridge; 1626–1628; With: Sir Ferdinando Fairfax	Succeeded by Sir Ferdinando Fairfax; Francis Neville
Preceded by Sir Henry Crofts; John Thoroughgood	Member of Parliament for Derby; 1628–1629; With: Timothy Leeving	Vacant No Parliaments summoned until 1640 Title next held by William Allestry
Preceded by John Vaughan; Richard Legh	Member of Parliament for Newton; June–October 1661; With: Richard Legh	Succeeded by Richard Legh; The Lord Gorges of Dundalk
Parliament of Ireland
Preceded by Sir Edward Harris; Henry Gosnold	Member of Parliament for Clonakilty; 1634–1635; With: Sir Robert Travers	Succeeded by Sir Robert Travers; Peregrine Banastre
Preceded by Walter Loftus; Francis Crosbie	Member of Parliament for Carysfort; 1640–1641; With: Francis Crosbie	Succeeded by Protectorate Parliament
