= Falkiner =

Falkiner is a surname. Notable people with the surname include:

- Daniel Falkiner (1683–1759), Irish politician
- Frederick Falkiner (judge) (1831–1908), Irish judge
- Norman Falkiner (1872–1929), Australian politician
- Otway Falkiner (1909–2000), Australian politician
- Riggs Falkiner (c. 1712–1797), Irish baronet and politician
- Sophie Falkiner (born 1973), Australian television presenter
- Falkiner baronets
