= Owen MacCarthy =

Owen MacCarthy (fl. 1692) was an Irish Jacobite politician and soldier.

MacCarthy was a Member of Parliament for Clonakilty in the short-lived Patriot Parliament called by James II of England in 1689. During the Williamite War in Ireland, he raised a regiment of foot and was a colonel serving under the Earl of Tyrconnell. He left Ireland for France with James II in 1690, and in 1692 he was a colonel in the Irish Brigade of the French Royal Army.

Parliament of Ireland
Preceded by Joshua Boyle; Arthur Freke	Member of Parliament for Clonakilty; 1689; With: Daniel Fionn MacCarthy	Succeeded by Francis Bernard; Percy Freke
