= Sir John Brookes, 1st Baronet =

English MP

Sir John Brookes, 1st Baronet, FRS (baptised 9 June 1636 – 18 November 1691) was an English MP for Boroughbridge. He was alternatively known as Sir John Brooke.

He was baptised on 9 June 1636 at St Martin, Coney Street, York, the only son of James Brookes, a merchant of York who was Lord Mayor of York in 1651. John was educated at York School and Gray's Inn, London before entering Christ's College, Cambridge in 1652.

In 1662 he was elected as an original Fellow of the Royal Society but subsequently expelled in 1685.

He became a justice of the peace (JP) for York and later for the North Riding of Yorkshire. He was created a Baronet on 13 June 1676. In 1679 and again in 1681 he was elected member of parliament for Boroughbridge in North Yorkshire as a member of the militant Country Party faction.

He died in 1691 and was buried at St Martin's church in Coney Street, York. He had married Mary, the daughter of the regicide Sir Hardress Waller of Kilfinny, co. Limerick and his wife Elizabeth Dowdall, with whom he had 4 sons and 7 daughters. He was succeeded by his son James, the 2nd Baronet.

Baronetage of England
New creation	Baronet (of York); 1676–1691	Succeeded by James Brookes
