= Gosnold (surname) =

Gosnold is a surname. Notable people with the surname include:

- Bartholomew Gosnold (1571–1607), English lawyer, explorer, and privateer
- Henry Gosnold (c. 1560–c. 1655), English lawyer in Ireland
- John Gosnold (by 1507–1554), English politician
