= Fenton baronets =

Extinct baronetcy in the Baronetage of Ireland

The Fenton Baronetcy, of Mitchelstown in the County of Cork, was a title in the Baronetage of Ireland. It was created on 22 July 1661 for Maurice Fenton. The baronetcy became extinct on 17 March 1670, with the death of his son William Fenton.

== History ==
Sir Geoffrey Fenton, Principal Secretary of State in Ireland, had a grant, 27 August 1600, of the manor and town of Clontarf, Dublin. He married Alice, daughter of Robert Weston, LL.D., Lord Chancellor of Ireland and his first wife Alice Jenyngs, and widow of Hugh Brady, Bishop of Meath, and died 19 October 1608, leaving a son and heir William, and a daughter Catherine, who married Richard Boyle, 1st Earl of Cork.

Sir William Fenton (died 1667), of Mitchelstown in the county of Cork, married Margaret (1602–1666), daughter of Maurice Fitzgibbon (son of Edmond Fitzgibbon, 11th White Knight) and sister and heiress of Maurice Oge Fitzgibbon, 12th White Knight. They had a son and a daughter:

- Maurice, his heir, who succeeded him in the title
- Catherine, who married John King, 1st Baron Kingston.

Sir Maurice Fenton, of Mitchelstown, had been dubbed a knight on the morning of 7 June 1658 at Cork House by Henry Cromwell, Lord Deputy of Ireland under the Commonwealth which passed into oblivion at the Restoration. 23 October 1653 he married Elizabeth, daughter of the regicide Sir Hardress Waller and Elizabeth Dowdall of Castletown, in the county of Limerick, and by her, who married secondly, in 1667, Sir William Petty, and was created Baroness Shelburne in her own right, Maurice left at his death, in 1664, two children:

- Margaret (died 1667), who was unmarried
- William (died 17 March 1670), son and heir on whose death the title became extinct and the estates went to his aunt Catherine's descendants and were inherited by the Earls of Kingston.

== Fenton baronets, of Mitchelstown (1661) ==
- Sir Maurice Fenton, 1st Baronet (c. 1622–1664)
- Sir William Fenton, 2nd Baronet (c. 1655–1671)
