= Joshua Boyle =

Joshua Boyle may refer to:

- Joshua Boyle, kidnapped in Afghanistan; see kidnapping of Joshua Boyle and Caitlan Coleman
- Joshua Boyle (politician), member of parliament in the Irish House of Commons, 1641
