= Elizabeth Petty, Baroness Shelburne =

Anglo-Irish peer

Elizabeth Waller, Baroness Shelburne (c. 1636 – February 1708) was an Anglo-Irish peer.

Elizabeth Waller was born in Castleton, County Limerick, one of the four daughters of Elizabeth Dowdall (died 1658) and Sir Hardress Waller (c. 1604–1666). Her father was one of the regicides who condemned Charles I to death. After the Restoration of Charles II he was in his turn sentenced to death after being found guilty of regicide, but he was reprieved, and died in prison. Her mother was noted for her spirited defence of the family home, Kilfinny Castle, during the Irish Rebellion of 1641.

On 23 October 1653 she married Sir Maurice Fenton, 1st Baronet (c. 1622–1664). They had a daughter Margaret and a son William. Margaret died in 1667 unmarried. William died in 1670.

In 1667 she married secondly Sir William Petty (1623–1687). Lady Elizabeth and William Petty had four children:

- Anne Petty (died November 1737)
- John (c. 1669–c. 1670)
- Charles Petty, 1st Baron Shelburne (1672–1696)
- Henry Petty, 1st Earl of Shelburne (1675–17 April 1751)

Lady Petty was created Baroness Shelburne on 13 December 1688 suo jure by James II. On the same day her eldest son by William Petty, Charles Petty, became Baron Shelburne.
