= Castlemartyr (Parliament of Ireland constituency) =

Pre-1801 Irish constituency

- Former borough constituency for the Irish House of Commons
- County: County Cork
- Borough: Castlemartyr

1676–1801
- Seats: 2
- Replaced by: Disfranchised

Castlemartyr was a constituency represented in the Irish House of Commons from 1676 to 1800.

== Borough ==
This constituency was the borough of Castlemartyr in County Cork. After its establishment in 1676 it had a sovereign, 12 burgesses and freemen. It was the base of Henry Boyle, Speaker of the Irish House of Commons from 1733 to 1756.

== History ==
In the Patriot Parliament of 1689 summoned by James II, Castlemartyr was not represented. Under the terms of the Acts of Union 1800, the constituency was disenfranchised and abolished in 1801. The 2nd Earl of Shannon received £15,000 compensation for its disenfranchisement.

== Members of Parliament, 1676–1801 ==
=== 1689–1801 ===
Election	First MP	Second MP
1689	Castlemartyr was not represented in the Patriot Parliament	
1692	Sir Richard Hull	Robert Pooley
1695	Samuel Morris	Robert Pooley
September 1703	Thomas Keightley (Note: Also elected for County Kildare in 1703, for which he chose to sit.)	Joseph Deane (Note: Also elected for County Dublin in 1703, for which he chose to sit.)
1703	Robert FitzGerald	Sir Thomas Dilkes
1709	Robert FitzGerald	St John Brodrick
1713	William Southwell	Robert Oliver
1715	Bartholomew Purdon	Charles Coote
1727	Bartholomew Purdon	John FitzGerald
1728	Bartholomew Purdon	Michael O'Brien Dilkes
1737	Thomas Evans	Michael O'Brien Dilkes
1753	John Lysaght (Note: Styled as The Honourable from 1758)	Michael O'Brien Dilkes
1761	Anthony Malone	John Magill
1768	Sir John Colthurst, 1st Bt	Attiwell Wood
1775	John Bennett	Attiwell Wood
1776	James Lysaght	Sir Riggs Falkiner, 1st Bt
1783	John Bennett	Broderick Chinnery
1787	Henry Cox	Broderick Chinnery
1790	Sir James Cotter, 2nd Bt	Charles O'Neill (Note: Also elected for Clonakilty in 1790, for which he chose to sit)
1792	Sir James Cotter, 2nd Bt	John Hobson
1798	Sir James Cotter, 2nd Bt	John Townsend
1801	Disenfranchised	

== Bibliography ==
- O'Hart, John (2007). The Irish and Anglo-Irish Landed Gentry: When Cromwell came to Ireland. Vol. II. Heritage Books. ISBN 0-7884-1927-7.
- Johnston-Liik, E. M. (2002). History of the Irish Parliament, 1692–1800, Publisher: Ulster Historical Foundation, ISBN 1-903688-09-4
- T. W. Moody, F. X. Martin, F. J. Byrne, A New History of Ireland 1534–1691, Oxford University Press, 1978
- Tim Cadogan and Jeremiah Falvey, A Biographical Dictionary of Cork, 2006, Four Courts Press ISBN 1-84682-030-8
- Leigh Rayment's historical List of Members of the Irish House of Commons. Cites: Johnston-Liik, Edith Mary (2002). The History of the Irish Parliament 1692-1800 (6 volumes). Ulster Historical Foundation.
