= Broderick Chinnery =

Irish politician

Sir Broderick Chinnery, 1st Baronet (13 February 1742 – May 1808), was an Irish politician and baronet.

He was the fourth son of Reverend George Chinnery and his wife Eleanor Whitfield, daughter of William Whitfield. Chinnery was barrister and became High Sheriff of County Cork in 1786. He sat as Member of Parliament for Castlemartyr from 1783 to 1790. Subsequently, he represented Bandonbridge in the Irish House of Commons until the Act of Union in 1801 and thereafter Bandon in the Parliament of the United Kingdom until 1806. On 29 August 1799, Chinnery was created a Baronet, of Flintfield, in the County of Cork.

Escutcheon of the Chinnery baronets of Flintfield

In February 1768, he married firstly his second cousin Margaret Chinnery, daughter of Nicholas Chinnery. They had three daughters and three sons. Margaret died in 1783, and Chinnery married secondly Alice Ball, fourth daughter of Robert Ball on 2 July 1789. He had two sons and two daughters by his second wife. Chinnery was succeeded in the baronetcy by Broderick, his eldest and only surviving son of his first marriage.

Parliament of Ireland
Preceded by James Lysaght; Sir Riggs Falkiner, 1st Bt	Member of Parliament for Castlemartyr; 1783–1790; With: John Bennett 1783–1787; Henry Cox 1787–1790	Succeeded by Sir James Cotter, 2nd Bt; Charles O'Neill
Preceded by Francis Bernard; Lodge Evans Morres	Member of Parliament for Bandonbridge; 1790 – 1801; With: Lodge Evans Morres 1790–1796; William Ponsonby 1796–1798; Robert William O'Callaghan 1798–1801	Succeeded by Parliament of the United Kingdom
Parliament of the United Kingdom
New constituency	Member of Parliament for Bandon; 1801 – 1806	Succeeded by Hon. Courtenay Boyle
Baronetage of Ireland
New creation	Baronet (of Flintfield); 1799–1808	Succeeded by Broderick Chinnery
