= John Lancaster (bishop) =

Church of Ireland bishop of Waterford and Lismore

John Lancaster was a seventeenth century Anglican Bishop of Waterford and Lismore in Ireland.

He was born in Prescot, Lancashire, and was probably the third son of Thomas Lancaster of Rainhill. He was educated at Eton College and King's College, Cambridge, where he graduated BA in 1592, MA in 1597, and was a fellow of the college 1590–97.

A Chaplain to James I, to supplement his income he held several livings, was a prebendary of four other dioceses and Treasurer of Lismore. He died in 1619.

He was married and had at least one son, also named John, who was prebendary of Waterford and Lismore. The younger John married Elizabeth Harris, the favourite daughter of Sir Edward Harris, MP for Clonakilty and Chief Justice of Munster and his first wife Elizabeth Fowelll. Elizabeth died in childbirth in November 1624, greatly to the grief of her father, who erected a memorial to her at Kinsalebeg Church, Ferrypoint, County Waterford. Elizabeth and John had one surviving son, also John, who died in 1683. The younger John spent many years engaged in litigation with his mother's relatives over what he claimed was his rightful share of the Harris inheritance.
