= Falkiner baronets of Anne Mount (1778) =

Irish baronetcy

The Falkiner baronetcy (surname pronounced "FALL-kin-err"), of Anne Mount (Glounthaune), in the County of Cork, was created in the Baronetage of Ireland on 24 August 1778 for Sir Riggs Falkiner, 1st Baronet. He represented Clonakilty in the Irish House of Commons.

The 4th Baronet was a captain in the Royal Navy, a lieutenant on HMS Shannon at its capture of USS Chesapeake. The 5th Baronet was a lieutenant-colonel of the 31st Foot in the British Army and served throughout the Peninsular War. As of 2026 the baronetcy is dormant.

== Falkiner baronets, of Anne Mount (1778) ==
- Sir Riggs Falkiner, 1st Baronet (died 1797)
- Sir Samuel Falkiner, 2nd Baronet (c. 1745–1825)
- Sir Riggs Falkiner, 3rd Baronet (1789–1850)
- Sir Charles Leslie Falkiner, 4th Baronet (1790–1858)
- Sir Samuel Edmund Falkiner, 5th Baronet (1791–1867)
- Sir Samuel Edmund Falkiner, 6th Baronet (1843–1893)
- Sir Leslie Edmund Percy Riggs Falkiner, 7th Baronet (1866–1917)
- Sir Terence Edmond Patrick Falkiner, 8th Baronet (1903–1987)
- Sir Edmond Charles Falkiner, 9th Baronet (1938–1997)
- Sir Benjamin Simon Patrick Falkiner, 10th Baronet (born 1962). Not on the Official Roll of the Baronetage.

The heir presumptive is the present presumed holder's brother Matthew Terence Falkiner, born 1964.
