= Henry Gosnold =

English-born Irish politician and judge

Henry Gosnold or Gosnell (c. 1560 – c. 1658) was an English-born lawyer who spent most of his very long life in Ireland. He sat in the Irish House of Commons and held office as Chief Justice of Munster and Deputy Admiralty judge for the same province. He is now mainly remembered for his friendship with Francis Bacon. He was also famous in his own lifetime for his wit: a few of his jokes still survive.

== Early career ==
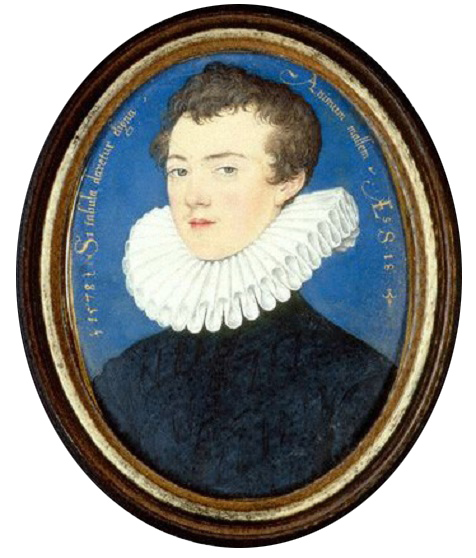
Francis Bacon aged 18, around the time his friendship with Gosnold began

He was the son of John Gosnold, a member of the well-known Gosnold family of Otley, Suffolk, and his wife Katherine Kinellmarsh of Coddenham; the explorer Bartholomew Gosnold was his cousin. The family name is also spelt Gosnell, Gosling or Gosnard. The year of his birth is uncertain, but was probably shortly after 1560, as we know from his own testimony that he was over 80 in 1646. Henry went to Trinity College, Cambridge, where he matriculated in 1577, and Staple Inn; he entered Gray's Inn in 1581. As a student he had a reputation for wit, and it may have been this which earned him the friendship of Francis Bacon, who is said to have been a distant relative. The closeness between the two men continued after their student days; in July 1592 they visited Twickenham together, and the friendship survived Henry's departure to Ireland in 1594.

At least one of his jokes (a rather laboured one for modern tastes) survives, concerning Bacon's determined but ultimately unsuccessful battle in 1594 to persuade Elizabeth I to appoint him, rather than Sir Edward Coke, as Attorney General. Gosnold quipped: "If it please her Majesty, the Bacon may be too hard for the Cook (Coke)".

== In Ireland ==
Gosnell first went to Ireland as secretary to William, Lord Russell, the Lord Deputy of Ireland, a post for which Bacon (whose aunt Elizabeth Cooke was the widow of Russell's brother John, Lord Russell) may have recommended him. He wrote to Bacon about the expedition in 1594 to relieve Enniskillen Castle, which was under siege (this was one of the first military actions of the Nine Years War), and gave his first impressions of the country. Unlike some other English settlers of the time he found the Irish climate very agreeable, praising "the clemency of the air and the healthiness of the soil", but he disliked the Irish people: "for cruelty and beggary I would never wish (to be in) a worse place".

== Judge in Munster ==
In 1596 he became Attorney General for the province of Munster. Promotion in the Provincial Court of Munster usually involved a progression from the office of Attorney General to that of Second Justice and then to Chief Justice of Munster. Henry duly followed this path, becoming Second Justice in 1608 and Chief Justice in 1624. He was also the Admiralty judge for the province for much of his judicial career; but alternated in that office with his West Cork neighbour Sir Robert Travers, despite frequent complaints, even from the Crown itself, about Travers's corruption, which led to repeated demands for his removal from office Until 1635 Munster was the only regional Admiralty court: its judge acted as Deputy for the Lord Chancellor of Ireland in his capacity as the senior Admiralty judge. He in turn was subject to the English Lord High Admiral. An intermediate Irish Court of Appeal in Admiralty existed for some years, but Gosnold himself is known to have been opposed to its continuance, arguing that its operations weakened the Lord Admiral's authority.

== Earl of Essex ==
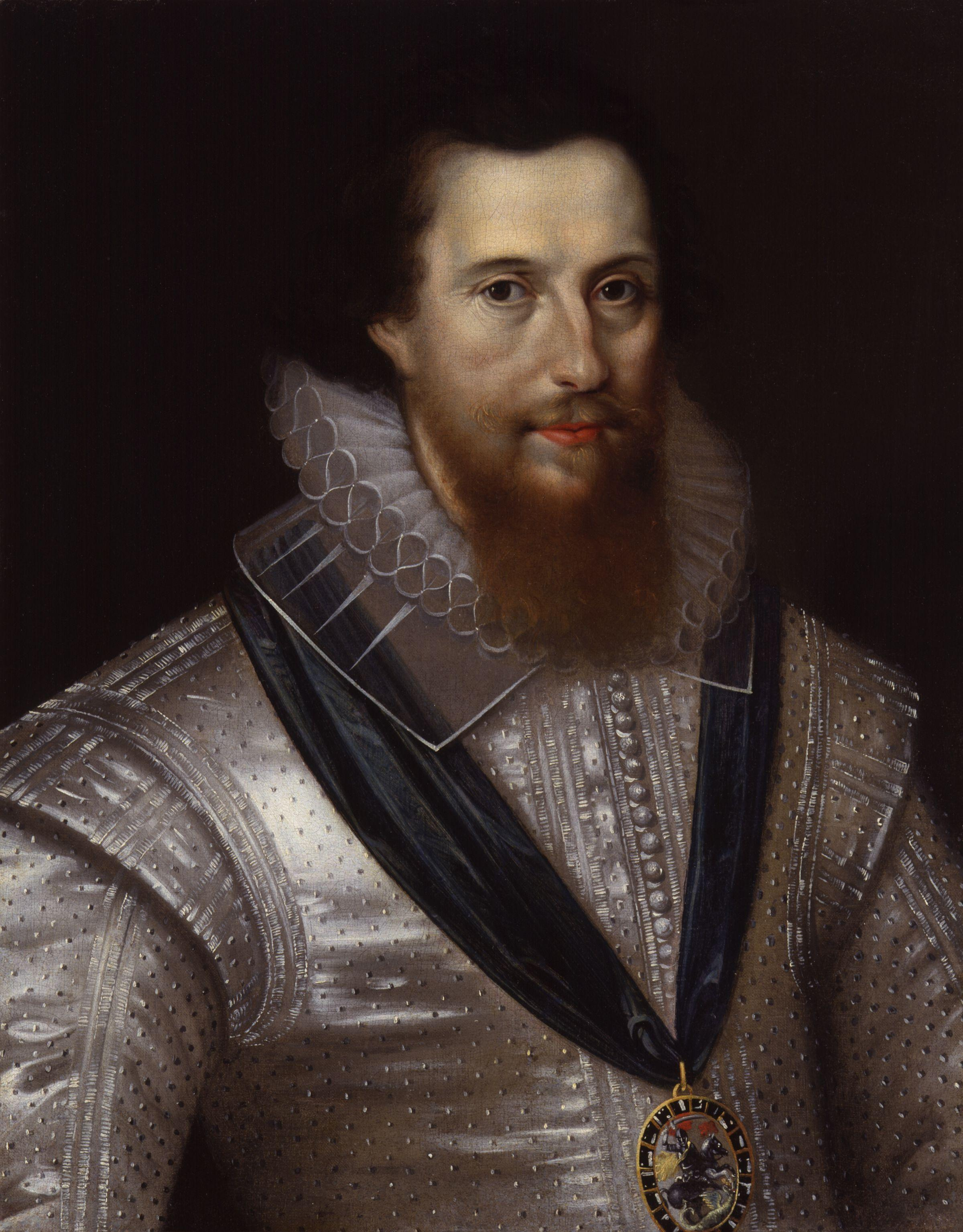
Robert Devereux, 2nd Earl of Essex, Gosnold's first patron

Gosnold, like Francis Bacon, was a protégé of Robert Devereux, 2nd Earl of Essex, to whom he was distantly related, and during Essex's time in Ireland was in regular attendance on him. Essex's return to England, and subsequent downfall, were deeply troubling for Gosnold: he wrote anxiously to Essex in November 1599 about the rumours of his disgrace, which he trusted (wrongly) would prove to be unfounded.

== Politics ==
After the downfall and execution for treason of Essex in 1601, Gosnold, like most of the prominent men of Munster, became a client of the "Great Earl", Richard Boyle, 1st Earl of Cork. Lord Cork built up a political "empire" in County Cork by the foundation of new towns, which became Parliamentary boroughs returning his own nominees to the Irish Parliament. Gosnold, together with the Chief Justice of Munster, Sir Edward Harris, sat in the Parliament of 1613–5 as MP for Clonakilty. He served for a time as Recorder of Youghal, stepping down in 1617. His closest links were with Bandon, another of the new towns of Cork, of which he was a burgess in 1612.

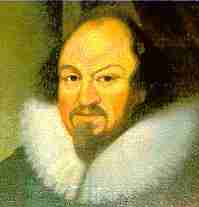
Richard Boyle, 1st Earl of Cork, Gosnold's later patron

== Admiralty judge ==
As Admiralty judge in the 1620s he clashed repeatedly with Henry De Laune, the French-born Vice-Admiral for Munster. De Laune objected to Gosnold's insistence that all goods seized from pirate vessels be subjected to the proper judicial process, and complained of the paltry size of his awards; Gosnold in return accused De Laune of keeping the prize goods for himself. By the lax standards of the age Gosnold, in contrast to his notoriously corrupt rival Sir Robert Travers, was an honest official. He did inquire in the 1630s if he could keep the fines he imposed, but dutifully complied with an instruction from the Crown that this would be improper.

== Last years ==
He continued in office as Admiralty judge into the early 1640s, but during the Irish Rebellion of 1641, he was unable to exercise his judicial functions. Like many landowners in Munster, notably Lord Cork's sons, he suffered heavy losses as a result of the Rebellion, though he was more fortunate than his rival Travers, who was killed at the Battle of Knocknanuss. In 1646 he petitioned the English Parliament for compensation, pleading that he was more than 80 years old and in acute financial distress. The petition was successful: Parliament authorised a payment of €150 to Thomas Muschamp, a London merchant, on Gosnold's behalf. The Provincial Court of Munster was abolished in 1655. Gosnold, who is known to have reached "a great age", is thought to still have been alive at the time: he probably died in 1658, when he cannot have been much short of 100.

== Family ==
He was married twice: his first wife was Wilgeford George and his second wife was called Fenton (she may have been a relative of Lord Cork's second wife Catherine Fenton). He had several children, of whom at least two, John and Rachel, survived to adulthood. His descendants were mostly associated with Skibereen and Clonakilty. Their estates were small, no doubt due to Henry's losses. They usually spelt their family name Gosnell or Gosling.
