= Attiwell Wood =

Irish politician, barrister and Law Officer

Attiwell Wood (1728-1784) was an Irish politician, barrister and Law Officer of the eighteenth century.

== Background ==
He was a native of County Cork. He was born into a family which had a long association with the town of Bandon; an earlier Attiwell Wood, probably his grandfather, was a member of Bandon Corporation in 1702. There is reason to believe that the eldest son in each generation of the Wood family was named Attiwell, and the tradition continued up to the late nineteenth century.

== Career ==
He entered the Trinity College Dublin in 1744 and the Middle Temple in 1747. He was called to the Irish Bar in 1753. He became Third Serjeant-at-law (Ireland) in 1777 and was made Second Serjeant in 1779; he held the latter office until his death. He sat in the Irish House of Commons as member for Castlemartyr from 1769 to 1776, and for Clonakilty from 1776 to 1783. He died in March of the following year.

== Marriage and children ==
He married Elizabeth Falkiner, daughter of Sir Riggs Falkiner, 1st Baronet and his first wife Mary Barker. Sir Riggs represented the same two constituencies in reverse order: presumably he and his son-in-law did a "swap" as to which seat each would hold. Attiwell and Elizabeth had at least one son, also named Attiwell, who married Mary Brasier, daughter of Kilner Brasier, and a daughter Louisa, who married Hugh Norcott (died 1834) JP, of Castleconnell and Springfield, County Limerick. Louisa died in 1839; she and Hugh had no children.

A later Attiwell Wood, who was probably the Serjeant's great-grandson, is recorded as a landowner in County Cork in the 1870s.
