= Thomas Harris (Serjeant-at-Law) =

Member of the Parliament of England

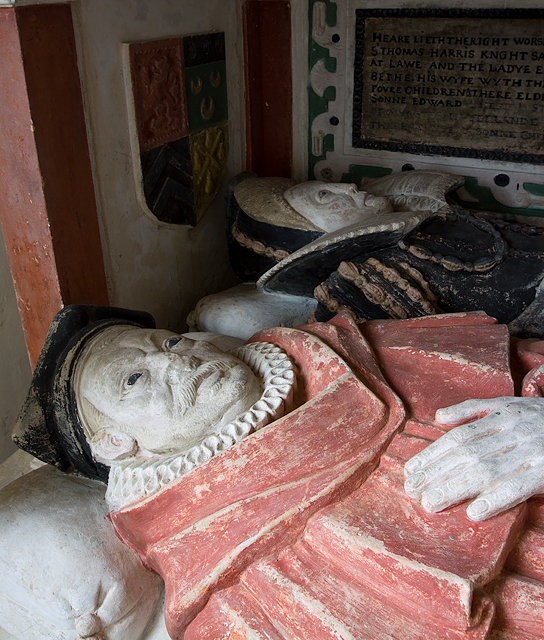
Monument to Sir Thomas and Elizabeth Harris in St Peter's church, Cornworthy

Thomas Harris (1547–1610) was an English barrister and politician. He became serjeant-at-law in 1589.

He was the son of Edward Harris of Cornworthy and Phillipa Vowell. His father, of Welsh origin, purchased Cornworthy in 1560. Thomas married Elizabeth, daughter of Henry Pomeroy of Berry Pomeroy. He went to the University of Cambridge, entered the Middle Temple in 1566, and was called to the Bar by 1573. He succeeded to his father's estates in 1592.

He was a Member of the Parliament of England for Callington in 1584, Portsmouth in 1586 and 1589, Bossiney in 1593 and 1597, and Truro in 1601. He retired from public life, with a knighthood, in 1603. He died in 1610; his widow died in 1634.

Sir Thomas Harris was called by his contemporary the Devon historian Tristram Risdon (d. 1640) "a man much commended for his pregnant wit and learning".

== Family ==
There is a monument to Harris and his wife, Dame Elizabeth Harris (born Pomeroy), at the parish church in Cornworthy, Devon. Their eldest daughter Anne Southwell was born at Cornworthy Priory and was baptised on 22 August 1584 at St Peter's church in Cornworthy in Devon. Anne was a noted poet. Their eldest son Sir Edward Harris moved to Ireland where he became a prominent judge. Edward was the grandfather of faith healer Valentine Greatrakes. He was buried in his local church at Kilcredan in County Cork, but the inscription on his parents' tomb strongly suggests that he was reinterred with them. They had two other children, Christopher, a soldier who was killed fighting in the Netherlands, and Honor, who married Sir Hugh Harris (not apparently a relative, and evidently a Scotsman). The Harris family died out in the male line in about 1643, leading to a particularly acrimonious lawsuit between Sir Edward's female heirs, his daughters and daughter-in-law, over the inheritance.
