= Brookes baronets =

Extinct baronetcy in the Baronetage of England

The Brookes Baronetcy, of York in the County of York, was a title in the Baronetage of England. It was created on 15 June 1676 for John Brookes, subsequently Member of Parliament for Boroughbridge. The title became extinct on the death of the third Baronet in 1770.

== Brookes baronets, of York (1676) ==
- Sir John Brookes, 1st Baronet (died 1691)
- Sir James Brookes, 2nd Baronet (c. 1675–1742)
- Sir Job Brookes, 3rd Baronet (died 1770)
