= Richard Hull (1641–1693) =

Anglo-Irish politician

Sir Richard Hull (1641–1693) was an Anglo-Irish politician.

Hull was a Member of Parliament for Castlemartyr in the Irish House of Commons between 1692 and 1693.

Parliament of Ireland
Preceded by Not represented in the Patriot Parliament	Member of Parliament for Castlemartyr; 1692–1693; With: Robert Pooley	Succeeded by Samuel Morris; Robert Pooley
