= Riggs Falkiner =

Irish baronet and politician

Sir Riggs Falkiner, 1st Baronet (c. 1712 – 24 April 1797) was an Irish baronet and politician.

He was the oldest son of Caleb Falkiner, a merchant of Cork city, and his wife Ruth Riggs, daughter of Edward Riggs of Riggsdale. He was a cousin of the politician Daniel Falkiner, and on his mother's side of the writer Anna, Lady Miller, née Riggs. He sat in the Irish House of Commons for Clonakilty from 1768 to 1776 and subsequently for Castlemartyr to 1783. On 24 August 1778, he was created a baronet, of Anne Mount, in the County of Cork.

On 5 January 1737, Falkiner married firstly Mary Barker. She died in 1762, and Falkiner married secondly Anne Maturin, daughter of Reverend Gabriel James Maturin, in October 1764. He had four daughters and three sons by his first wife, and one daughter Sarah Anne by his second wife. Falkiner died in 1797 and was succeeded in the baronetcy by his only surviving son Samuel. His daughter Elizabeth married Attiwell Wood, a prominent local barrister who, no doubt through a family arrangement, represented the same two constituencies as his father-in-law between 1769 and 1783. His youngest daughter, Sarah Anne, in 1784 married William Mullins, 2nd Baron Ventry, but died young in 1788, leaving two daughters.

Parliament of Ireland
Preceded by Henry Sheares; Matthew Parker	Member of Parliament for Clonakilty; 1768–1776; With: Richard Longfield	Succeeded by Thomas Adderley; Attiwell Wood
Preceded by John Bennett; Attiwell Wood	Member of Parliament for Castlemartyr; 1776–1783; With: James Lysaght	Succeeded by John Bennett; Broderick Chinnery
Baronetage of Ireland
New creation	Baronet (of Anne Mount); 1778–1797	Succeeded by Samuel Falkiner
