= Elizabeth Dowdall =

Defended Kilfinny Castle, Ireland, in 1641

Elizabeth Dowdall (née Southwell); c. 1590 – after 1642) was a member of the Irish gentry, famed for having defended Kilfinny Castle, County Limerick, against the insurgents during the Irish Rebellion of 1641.

== Birth and background ==
Elizabeth was born about 1590 in England, (Note: Her birth date is bracketed by her parents' marriage in 1594 and her father's death in 1626.) probably in Cornworthy, Devon, the only child of Sir Thomas Southwell and his wife, Anne Harris. Her father's family was from Spixworth in Norfolk.

Elizabeth's mother was an English Calvinist poet. Her father was Thomas Harris (Serjeant-at-Law). Her father's family was from Cornworthy, Devon. Elizabeth's parents had married at St Clement Danes in London on 24 June 1594.

Family tree

Elizabeth Dowdall (née Southwell) with her two husbands, her parents, and other selected relatives. (Note: Also see the lists of children in the text.)

Thomas; Harris; 1547–1610 | Connor; 3rd Earl c. 1534 – 1581
John; Dowdall | Thomas; Southwell c. 1575 – 1626 | Anne; Harris; 1574–1636 poet | Daniel; 1st Viscount; Clare; 1577–1666
John; Dowdall fl. 1623 | Elizabeth; Southwell c. 1600 – aft. 1642 | Donogh; O'Brien d. 1638 d.v.p.* | Connor; 2nd Viscount; 1605–1670
Ann; Dowdall | Redmond; Roche c. 1610 – aft. 1654 | Jane; Dowdall d. bef. 1638 | Honora; Dowdall d. 1638
Hardress; Waller c. 1604 – 1666 | Elizabeth; Dowdall d. 1658 | Bridget; Dowdall
Jane; Roche

Legend

| XXX | Subject of the article | XXX | Viscounts; Clare |

*d.v.p. = predeceased his father (decessit vita patris)

== Early life ==
It is quite well accepted that Elizabeth's father was knighted. However, the person knighted in July 1603 as part of the coronation honours of James I seems to have been her maternal grandfather, Thomas Harris (Serjeant-at-Law), not her father as has been said.

Elizabeth's maternal uncle Edward Harris (Irish judge) was sent to Ireland in 1608 and made chief justice of Munster. He helped his brother-in-law to obtain land at Poulnelong, (Note: Poulnelong is the modern Ship-pool (or Shippool) in the parish of Leighmoney near Bandon. not near Youghal as has been wrongly stated.) County Cork, Ireland as part of the Plantation of Munster, which had started in 1583 after the Desmond Rebellions ended with the death of Gerald FitzGerald, 14th Earl of Desmond. Elizabeth's uncle Sir Edward Harris played a leading part in this plantation.

== First marriage ==
Elizabeth married Sir John Dowdall, a wealthy settler in County Limerick, Ireland (alive in 1623).

John and Elizabeth had five daughters:

1. Anne, married John Southwell of Rathkeale, brother of Sir Thomas Southwell, 1st Baronet, and Anne's fifth cousin three times removed. John was killed by the rebels in 1642 and died childless. She later married George Piggott, of Kilfinny.
2. Elizabeth (died 1658), married Sir Hardress Waller in 1629
3. Jane (died before 1638), married Redmond Roche as his first wife
4. Bridget, married Thomas Casey of Rathcannon, County Limerick
5. Honora (died 1638), married Lawrence Dowdall of Mountown, County Meath

== Father's death and mother's remarriage ==
Her father died on 12 June 1626 in Ireland. Her mother remarried Captain Henry Sibthorpe and after two years the new couple moved back to England. Her mother died on 2 October 1636 in Acton, London, England.

== Second marriage ==
Elizabeth married secondly Donough, eldest son of Daniel O'Brien, brother of Donogh O'Brien, 4th Earl of Thomond and future (1662) 1st Viscount Clare. Elizabeth appears to have been married to him by 1626. Donough died on 6 August 1638 in Limerick predeceasing his father.

== Defence of Kilfinny Castle ==
Phelim O'Neill launched the Irish Rebellion of 1641 from the northern province of Ulster in October 1641. The rebellion reached Munster in spring 1642. The rebels attacked the castles of the English settlers. Dowdall defended Kilfinny Castle against the rebels, and is reputed to have hung several of them during the fighting.

It is not known what happened to Dowdall after 1642.

== See also ==
- Lettice Digby, 1st Baroness Offaly, who also coordinated the defence of a castle during the rebellion.

== Notes and references ==
=== Sources ===
- Anonymous (1846). The Parliamentary Gazetteer of Ireland. Vol. 2. Dublin: A. Fullarton. – D to M (for Ship-pool in Leighmoney parish)
- Ball, Francis Elrington (1926). The Judges in Ireland 1221–1921. Vol. I (1st ed.). London: John Murray. OCLC 832154869. – 1221 to 1690
- Bourke, Angela, ed. (2002). The Field Day Anthology of Irish Writing. Vol. 5. New York: New York University Press. ISBN 0-8147-9907-8. – Irish Women’s Writing and Traditions (for Lady Dowdall's narration)
- Caulfield, Richard (1879). The Council Book of the Corporation of Kinsale from 1652 to 1800. Guildford, Surrey: J. Billings and Sons. OCLC 1195553289.
- Cokayne, George Edward (1904). Complete Baronetage, 1611 to 1800. Vol. 4 (1st ed.). Exeter: William Pollard & Co. OCLC 866278985. – 1665 to 1707
- Colby, Frederic Thomas, ed. (1872). The Visitation of the County of Devon in the Year 1620. London: The Harleian Society. OCLC 3975627.
- Coolahan, Marie-Louise (9 May 2019). "Dowdall [née Southwell], Elizabeth". Oxford Dictionary of National Biography (online ed.). Oxford University Press. (Subscription, Wikipedia Library access or UK public library membership required.)
- Gilbert, John Thomas, ed. (1882b). History of the Irish Confederation and the War in Ireland 1641–1643. Historic literature of Ireland. Vol. 2 (limited to two hundred copies ed.). Dublin: Printed for the editor by M. H. Gill & Son. OCLC 220683699. – Letters, acts, and Lady Dowdall’s narration
- Klene, Jean (2004). "Southwell [née Harris], Anne, Lady Southwell (bap. 1574, d. 1636)". In Matthew, Colin; Harrison, Brian (eds.). Oxford Dictionary of National Biography. Vol. 51. New York: Oxford University Press. p. 704. ISBN 0-19-861401-2.
- "Ship-pool". National University of Ireland at Galway. Archived from the original on 21 January 2021.
- Lewis, Samuel (1840). A Topographical Dictionary of Ireland. Vol. 2 (2nd ed.). London: S. Lewis & Co. – G to Z (for Ship-pool)
- Lodge, John (1789a). Archdall, Mervyn (ed.). The Peerage of Ireland or, A Genealogical History of the Present Nobility of that Kingdom. Vol. 2. Dublin: James Moore. OCLC 264906028. – Earls 228
- Lodge, John (1789b). Archdall, Mervyn (ed.). The Peerage of Ireland or, A Genealogical History of the Present Nobility of that Kingdom. Vol. 6. Dublin: James Moore. OCLC 264906028. – Viscounts, barons (under Southwell)
- McGrath, Brid (1997). "Hardress Waller (?1604–1666) Limerick County". A Biographical Dictionary of the Membership of the Irish House of Commons 1640 to 1641 (PhD). Vol. 1. Dublin: Trinity College. pp. 292–295. hdl:2262/77206. – Parliaments & Biographies (PDF downloadable from given URL)
- O'Hart, John (1892). Irish Pedigrees: Or, the Origin and Stem of the Irish Nation. Vol. 2 (5th ed.). Dublin: James Duffy & Co. OCLC 7239210. – Normans, English, Huguenots etc.
- Perceval-Maxwell, Michael (1994). The Outbreak of the Irish Rebellion of 1641. Montreal: McGill-Queen’s University Press. ISBN 0-7735-1157-1. – Preview
- Stow, John; Howes, Emund (1631). Annales, Or, A Generall Chronicle of England. London: Richard Meighen. OCLC 123210534.
