= Chinnery baronets =

Title in the Baronetage of Ireland

Escutcheon of the Chinnery baronets of Flintfield

The Chinnery Baronetcy, of Flintfield, was a title in the Baronetage of Ireland. It was created on 29 August 1799 for the politician Broderick Chinnery who had represented two seats in the Irish House of Commons and subsequently sat in the House of Commons of the United Kingdom. The title became extinct on the death of his grandson, the third baronet, in 1868.

== Chinnery baronets, of Flintfield (1799) ==
- Sir Broderick Chinnery, 1st Baronet (1742–1808)
- Sir Broderick Chinnery, 2nd Baronet (1779–1840)
- Sir Nicholas Chinnery, 3rd Baronet (1804–1868)
