= Cornworthy Priory =

Former priory in Devon, England

Coordinates: 50.3885°N 3.6588°W

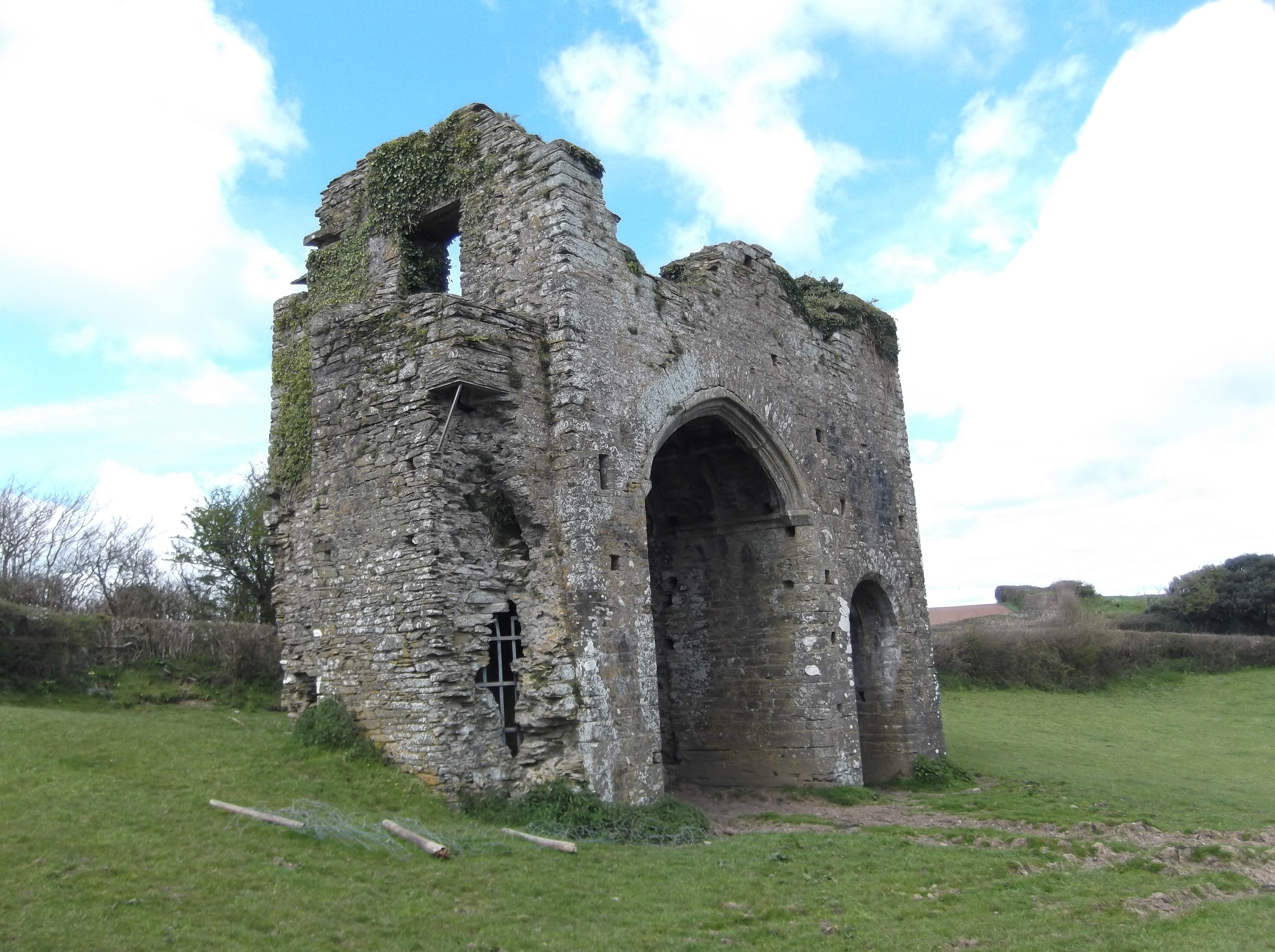
- The remains of Cornworthy Priory

General information
- Location: Cornworthy, England

Cornworthy Priory was a priory in Devon, England. It was founded in the early thirteenth century, for Augustinian nuns, and existed until 1536. At the Dissolution of the Monasteries the lands passed to the Harris family, and remained in the family until the 1640s. Thomas Harris who was a Serjeant-at-Law lived here with his wife Elizabeth. Their daughter, Anne, Lady Southwell, who was a noted poet, was born here.

== See also ==
- List of monastic houses in Devon
- List of monastic houses in England
