= Cornworthy =

Village in Devon, England

Coordinates: 50.3885°N 3.6508°W

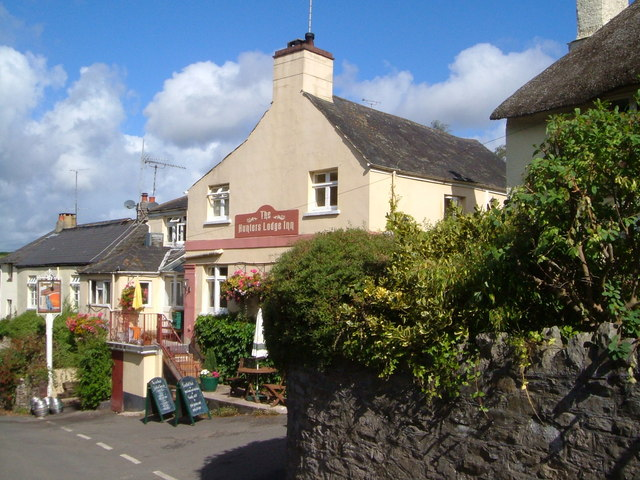
- Hunters' Lodge, Cornworthy

- Location within Devon
- Population: 368 (2021 census)
- Civil parish: Cornworthy
- District: South Hams
- Shire county: Devon
- Region: South West
- Country: England
- Sovereign state: United Kingdom
- Post town: TOTNES
- Postcode district: TQ9
- Police: Devon and Cornwall
- Fire: Devon and Somerset
- Ambulance: South Western

Cornworthy is a village and civil parish in the South Hams, Devon, England. In 2021 the parish had a population of 368.

The hamlet of East Cornworthy lies due east of the village at grid reference SX847552.

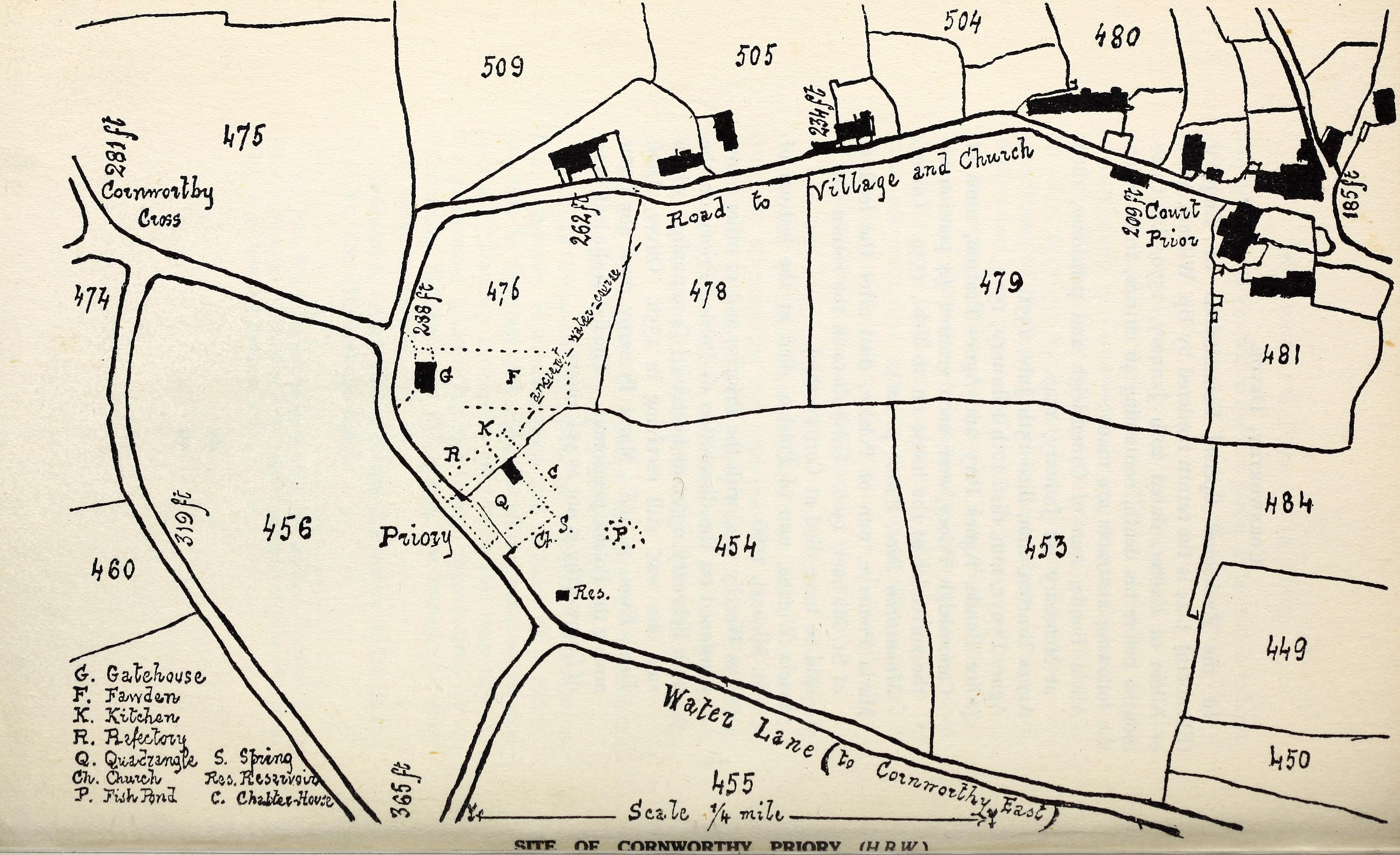
An old map of Cornworthy

The nearby Cornworthy Priory, originally established for nuns of the order of St. Austin, is now a Grade I listed building.

Cornworthy Church contains the tomb of the Harris family, who were Lords of the Manor from the mid-sixteenth century onwards. It was erected by Lady Elizabeth Harris, widow of Sir Thomas Harris, in 1611, to the memory of her husband who died in 1610. Elizabeth is buried in the tomb, as are several other members of the family including Sir Edward Harris (died 1636), eldest son of Thomas and Elizabeth. Edward spent much of his life in Ireland, where he became a substantial landowner and Chief Justice of Munster. He was the grandfather of the celebrated faith healer Valentine Greatrakes. Thomas and Elizabeth's family also included Anne who became a noted poet.
