= Kilfinny =

Parish and townland in County Limerick, Ireland

Coordinates: 52.5134°N 8.8057°W

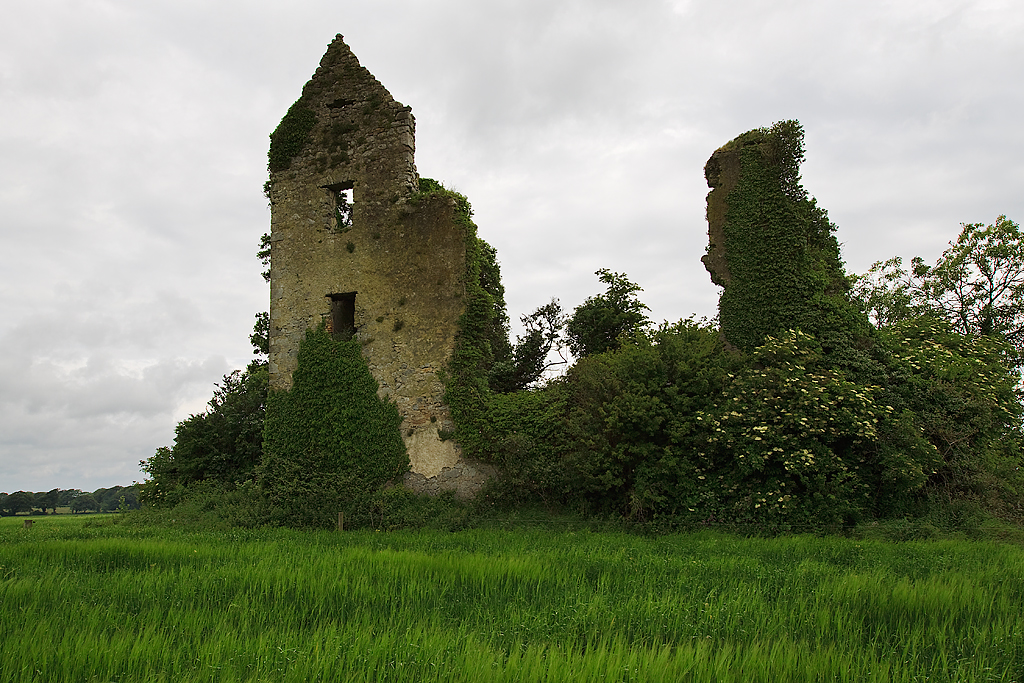
Kilfinny Castle, now in ruins, was besieged during the Irish Rebellion of 1641

Kilfinny (Irish: Cill na Fíonaí, meaning 'church of the wood') is a civil parish and townland in County Limerick, Ireland. It is close to Adare and Croom in the historical barony of Connello Upper.

Evidence of ancient settlement in the area includes a number of fulacht fiadh, holy well and ringfort sites in the townlands of Commons, Ballynakill and Kilfinny. Kilfinny Castle, an Elizabethan-era fortified house built on the site of an earlier tower house, was besieged during the Irish Rebellion of 1641. The coordination of the castle's defence, during the siege, is historically attributed to Elizabeth Dowdall.

The area's national (primary) school, known as Scoil Náisiúnta Ciarain or Kilfinny National School, had an enrollment of 53 pupils as of January 2024. St Kieran's church is in the Roman Catholic parish of Croagh-Kilfinny in the Diocese of Limerick. The current church is built on the site of an earlier late 18th-century chapel. The local Gaelic Athletic Association (GAA) club, Croagh-Kilfinny GAA, was founded in 1903.
