= Hardress Waller =

Parliamentarian commander in the Wars of the Three Kingdoms and regicide

Sir Hardress Waller
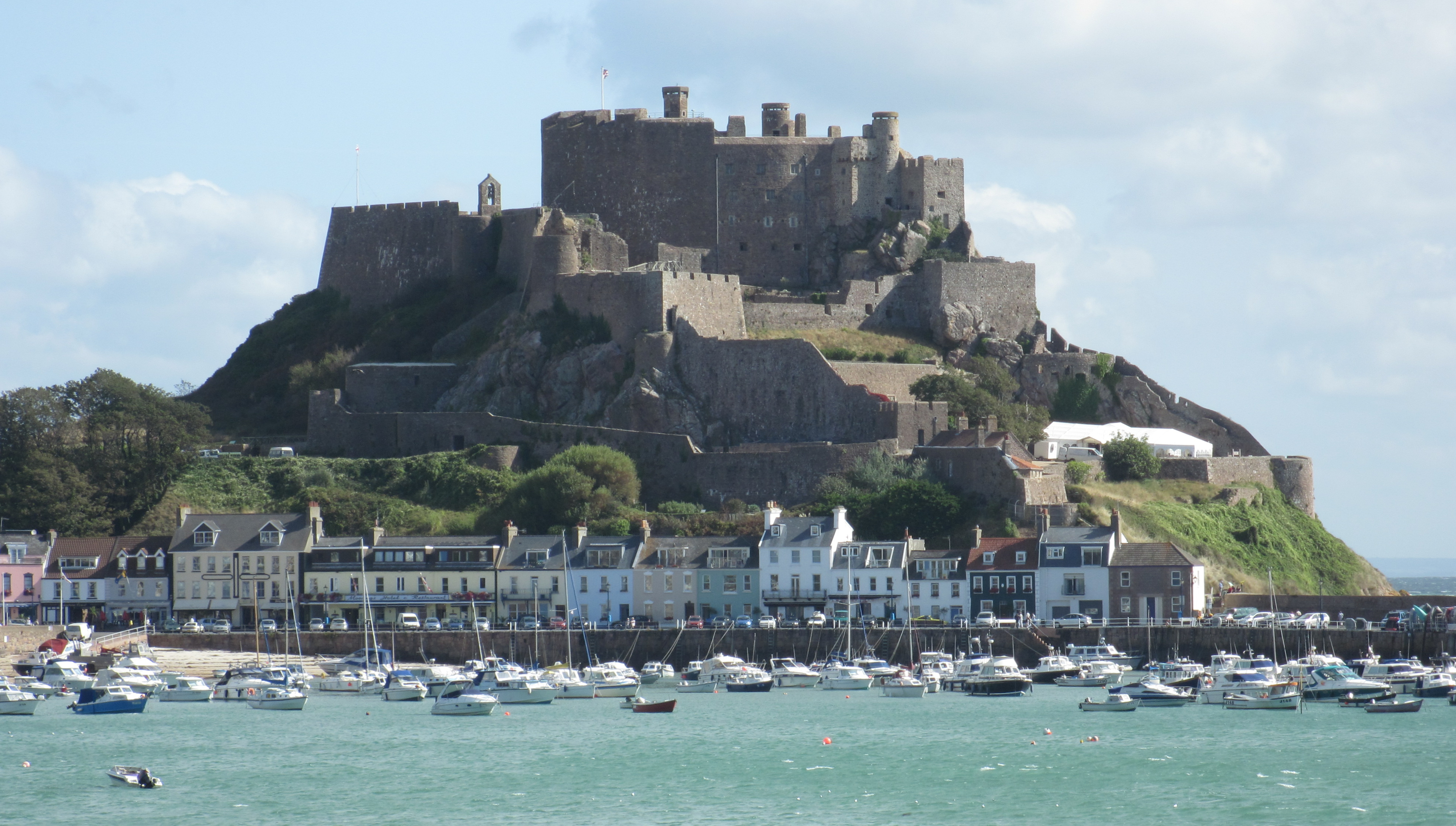
- Mont Orgueil, where Waller died in 1666

Member of the Protectorate Parliament for County Clare, County Limerick and County Kerry
- In office 1654–1659

Governor of Limerick
- In office 1651–1653

Member of the Irish Parliament for County Limerick
- In office March 1639 – January 1649 (did not sit after 1640, formally dissolved by the death of Charles I)

Member of the Irish Parliament for Askeaton
- In office July 1634 – April 1635

Personal details
- Born: c. 1604 Chartham, Kent, England
- Died: 30 July 1666 (aged 61) Mont Orgueil, Jersey
- Spouse: Elizabeth Dowdall (1629–1658)
- Relations: William Waller
- Children: Walter (1632?-1658/1659?); James (1636–1702); Bridget (1639-1721); Anne (1641–1709); Mary; Elizabeth (1637–1708)
- Parent(s): George and Mary Waller
- Occupation: Radical politician and soldier

Military service
- Years of service: 1625–1652
- Rank: Major General
- Battles/wars: Anglo-Spanish War (1625–1630); Cádiz expedition (1625); Irish Confederate Wars; Siege of Carlow; Limerick; Wars of the Three Kingdoms; Naseby; Langport; Bristol; Basing House; Siege of Exeter

Sir Hardress Waller (c. 1604 – 1666) was born in Kent and settled in Ireland during the 1630s. A first cousin of Parliamentarian general William Waller, he fought for Parliament in the Wars of the Three Kingdoms, becoming a leading member of the radical element within the New Model Army. In 1649, he signed the death warrant for the Execution of Charles I, and after the Stuart Restoration in 1660 was condemned to death as a regicide.

A prominent member of Protestant society in Munster in Ireland during the 1630s, Waller fought against the Catholic Confederacy following the 1641 Irish Rebellion. When the First English Civil War began in August 1642, Charles I wanted to use his Irish troops to help win the war in England, and in September 1643 agreed a truce or "Cessation" with the Confederacy. Waller opposed this and defected to the Parliamentarians; in April 1645, he was appointed a colonel in the New Model Army and fought throughout the final campaigns of 1645 and 1646.

An admirer of Oliver Cromwell, Waller became a political and religious radical; he took part in the 1647 Putney Debates, supported Pride's Purge in December 1648 and was a judge at the Trial of Charles I in January 1649. During the Protectorate, he held considerable political power in Ireland and was arrested in February 1660 after staging a coup in an attempt to prevent the Restoration of Charles II. At his trial for regicide in October 1660, Waller pleaded guilty and was sentenced to death, later commuted to life imprisonment. He died in 1666 at Mont Orgueil on the island of Jersey.

== Personal details ==
Hardress Waller is thought to have been born around 1604, the only son of George Waller and Mary Hardress, both of whom died by 1622. His father sold the family estates at Groombridge to his younger brother Thomas in 1601 and thereafter lived on his wife's property in Chartham, which is probably where Hardress was brought up. His first cousin was the Parliamentarian general Sir William Waller, Thomas's eldest son.

In 1629, he married the daughter of Elizabeth Dowdall, née Southwell, daughter of Sir Thomas Southwell, an English settler with extensive lands in County Limerick, through whom he acquired a large estate in Castletown. They had two sons, Walter (died late 1650s) and James (1636-1702), along with four daughters, all of whom made important marriages; Elizabeth (1637-1708) to Sir Maurice Fenton, Bridget (1639-1721) to Henry Cadogan, Anne (1641-1709) to Sir Henry Ingoldsby, 1st Baronet, a close relative of Oliver Cromwell, and Mary to Sir John Brookes. These connections ensured that despite his conviction for regicide in 1660, the Waller family held onto their Castletown estates and remained significant figures in Munster society into the 20th century.

== 1625 to 1646 ==
Details of Waller's early career are limited; his uncle Thomas fought in Ireland under Elizabeth I, and in 1625 Waller joined a regiment raised for the Anglo-Spanish War (1625–1630) by William St Leger, Lord President of Munster. Recruited for the disastrous assault on Cádiz in 1625, the ships carrying his unit were forced ashore in Ireland and never reached Spain. Knighted in 1629, he settled in Ireland after his marriage and was elected to the Parliament of Ireland in 1634 for Askeaton, then County Limerick in 1639. Waller was a leading opponent of Thomas Wentworth, 1st Earl of Strafford, who served as Lord Deputy of Ireland from 1632 to 1640. In December 1640, he was selected by the Irish Parliament to deliver a petition or "Remonstrance" attacking Strafford to the Long Parliament in Westminster; some of their complaints were included in the charges that ended with his execution in May 1641.

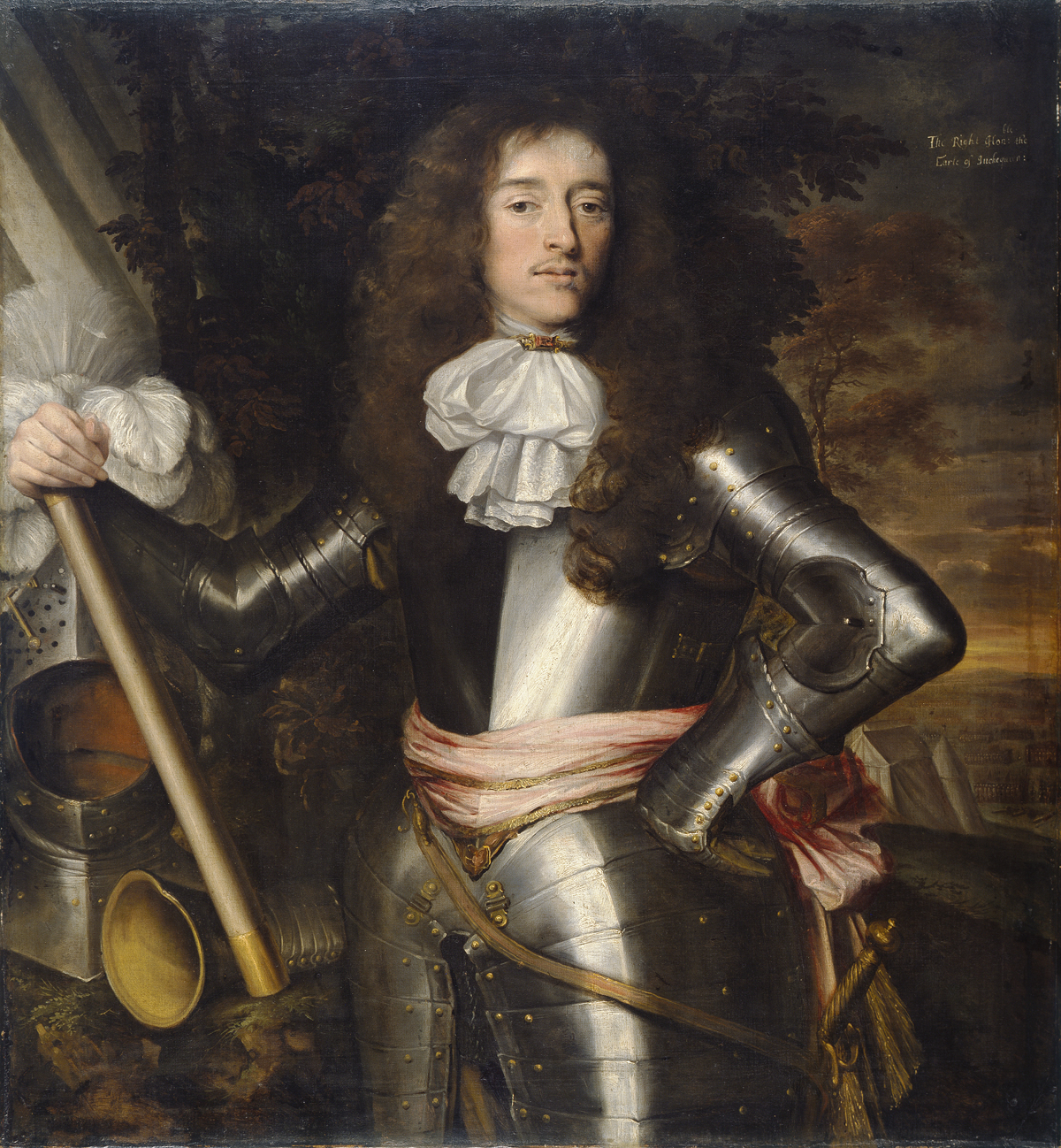
From 1642 to 1644, Waller served under Earl of Inchiquin, Protestant leader in Munster

Following the outbreak of the Irish Rebellion of 1641, Waller was besieged in his castle at Castletown by Patrick Purcell in March 1642. Shortage of water forced him to surrender six weeks later and he subsequently claimed to have lost property worth over £11,000. He was appointed lieutenant colonel in the army raised to suppress the revolt and a member of the Protestant war council in Munster but the outbreak of the First English Civil War in August 1642 ended supplies of men and money from England. In September, the Earl of Inchiquin, Protestant leader in Munster, sent Waller to the Royalist capital in Oxford to plead for additional resources.

However, Charles I wanted to use his Irish army to help win the war in England, and in September 1643 agreed a truce or "Cessation" with the Catholic Confederacy. Factions on both sides objected to the terms, which included negotiations on freedom of worship for Catholics and constitutional reforms. Protestants saw this as a threat, while many Confederates felt they were on the verge of victory and gained nothing from the truce; they were also well aware any concessions Charles made to Catholics in Ireland undermined his position in England and Scotland.

After failing to persuade Charles not to transfer troops from Ireland to England, Inchiquin declared for Parliament in July 1644 and Waller moved to London. By early 1645, he was serving in his cousin William's Western Army and when the New Model Army was formed in April 1645, he was given command of an infantry regiment. He fought at Naseby in June, followed by Langport, Bristol and Basing House, where he was wounded. When Charles surrendered in April 1646, he was part of the force besieging Exeter.

== 1647 to 1666 ==
Although his cousin Sir William was a moderate Presbyterian, during his service with the New Model Waller became a religious Independent and admirer of Oliver Cromwell. He transferred back to Ireland in February 1647 but fell out with Inchiquin and returned to England, where he became increasingly involved in radical politics and took part in the Putney Debates. During the 1648 Second English Civil War, he served as Parliamentarian commander in the strongly Royalist West Country and successfully suppressed a number of local revolts. Troops from his regiment took part in Pride's Purge in December which excluded moderate MPs from Parliament, while he was one of the 59 judges who signed the death warrant for the Execution of Charles I in January 1649. He was the only Irish Protestant to do so; many others, including Inchiquin, strongly opposed it and fought for the Royalists during the 1650 to 1652 Cromwellian conquest of Ireland.

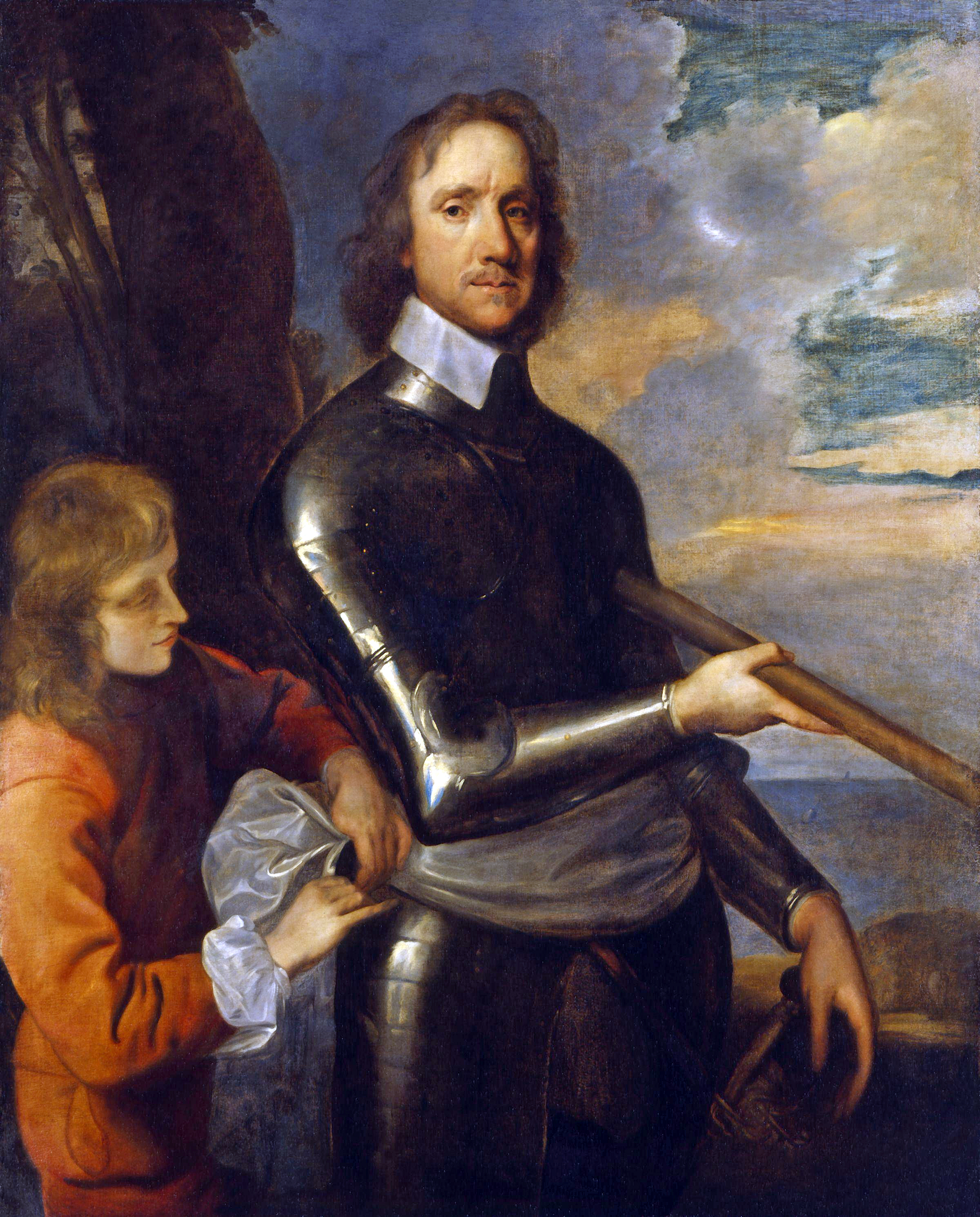
By 1646, Waller had become an admirer of Oliver Cromwell, whom he supported throughout The Protectorate

In December 1649 Waller was finally released from his command in South West England to join Cromwell in Ireland, who returned to England in May 1650. Promoted Major General in June, Waller captured Carlow Castle in July and was appointed Governor of Limerick after it surrendered in October 1651; this ended major military operations, although guerrilla warfare continued until 1653. Under the Protectorate, Waller held considerable political influence; his son-in-law Sir Henry Ingoldsby replaced him as Governor of Limerick in 1653 and the two men were MPs for County Clare, County Limerick and County Kerry in the Protectorate Parliaments of 1654, 1656 and 1659.

However, Waller's personal loyalty to Cromwell and status as a regicide isolated him from other Irish Protestants, the majority of whom were either hostile to the Commonwealth or suspicious of Cromwell's ambitions. In the political chaos that followed the resignation of Richard Cromwell in 1659, Waller opposed the Stuart Restoration and in February 1660 staged an attempted coup in Limerick. This was quickly suppressed by Sir Charles Coote and Lord Broghill, in what was the last military action of the Wars of the Three Kingdoms in Ireland.

Sent to England as a prisoner he managed to escape to France, then returned to London hoping to benefit from the Indemnity and Oblivion Act. One of only two regicides to plead guilty, he claimed to have been appointed to the trial without his knowledge, a suggestion dismissed by the republican Edmund Ludlow as indicating "one who would say anything to save his life". Condemned to death, his sentence was commuted to life imprisonment while he was also allowed to retain his lands. He was imprisoned in Mont Orgueil, Jersey, where he died in 1666.

== Sources ==
- BCW. "Sir Hardress Waller's Regiment of Foot". BCW.
- Burke, John; Burke, Sir Bernard (1844). A Genealogical and Heraldic History of the Extinct and Dormant Baronetcies of England, Ireland and Scotland Volume II. J. R. Smith.
- Clarke, Aidan (2004). "Jones, Michael". Oxford Dictionary of National Biography (online ed.). Oxford University Press. doi:10.1093/ref:odnb/15063. (Subscription, Wikipedia Library access or UK public library membership required.)
- Firth, Charles Harding (1899). "Waller, Sir Hardress (1604?–1666?)". In Lee, Sidney (ed.). Dictionary of National Biography. Vol. 59. New York: The MacMillan Company. pp. 127–129. OCLC 8544105.
- Lefevre, Peter (2010). Waller, Sir Thomas (c.1569–1613), of Groombridge and Dover Castle, Kent; formerly of Brenchley, Kent. in The History of Parliament: the House of Commons 1604–1629. CUP.
- Little, Patrick (2004). "Waller, Sir Hardress (1604–1666)". Oxford Dictionary of National Biography (online ed.). Oxford University Press. doi:10.1093/ref:odnb/28557. (Subscription, Wikipedia Library access or UK public library membership required.)
- Little, Patrick (2009). "Waller, Sir Hardress (1604–1666) in Dictionary of Irish Biography". 8861.
- Ludlow, Edmund (1978). Worden, A.P (ed.). A Voyce from the Watchtower. Royal Historical Society.
- McGrath, Brid (1997). A Biographical Dictionary of the Irish House of Commons 1640–1641 (Thesis). Trinity College Dublin.
- Murphy, Elaine (2012). "Two Inventories of Goods Belonging to Sir Hardress Waller in Ireland". Journal of the Royal Society of Antiquaries of Ireland. 142/143: 140–154. JSTOR 24892516.
- Raithby, John, ed. (1819). Charles II, 1660: An Act for the Attainder of severall persons guilty of the horrid Murther of his late Sacred Majestie King Charles the first in "Statutes of the Realm: Volume 5, 1628–80". Great Britain Record Commission.
- Royle, Trevor (2004). Civil War: The Wars of the Three Kingdoms 1638–1660. Abacus. ISBN 978-0-349-11564-1.
- Stoyle, Mark (2000). ""The Gear Rout": The Cornish Rising of 1648 and the Second Civil War". Albion: A Quarterly Journal Concerned with British Studies. 32 (1): 37–58. doi:10.2307/4053986. JSTOR 4053986.
- Venning, Timothy (2004). "Ingoldsby, Sir Richard, appointed Lord Ingoldsby under the protectorate". Oxford Dictionary of National Biography (online ed.). Oxford University Press. doi:10.1093/ref:odnb/14411. (Subscription, Wikipedia Library access or UK public library membership required.)
- Wiggins, Kenneth (2001). Anatomy of a Siege: King John's Castle, Limerick, 1642. Boydell & Brewer. ISBN 0-85115-827-7.
