= 2nd Regiment of Bengal Native Infantry =

Regiment of Bengal

The 2nd Regiment of Bengal Native Infantry was a Commonwealth (specifically, Indian) infantry unit that mutinied from command in 1857.

== Chronology ==
- 1758 raised in Burdwan as the Burdwan Battalion
- 1762 ranked as 8th Battalion
- 1764 became the 2nd (M'Lean) Battalion and moved to Madras under Captain M'Lean
- 1765 posted to the 1st Brigade
- 1775 renumbered 1st Battalion Bengal Native Infantry
- 1781 became the 1st Regiment Bombay Native Infantry
- 1784 became the 1st Regiment Bengal Native Infantry
- 1786 became the 1st Battalion Bengal Native Infantry
- 1796 became the 1st Battalion 1st Regiment Bengal Native Infantry
- 1824 became the 2nd Regiment Bengal Native Infantry
- 1859 disarmed at Barrackpore and disbanded

In 1861, after the mutiny, the title was given to the 31st Regiment of Bengal Light Infantry which later became the 2nd Queen Victoria's Own Rajput Light Infantry
