= Anne Southwell =

- Born: 1574; Clerkenwell Priory
- Died: 2 October 1636 (aged 61–62); Acton
- Writing career
- Genre: Poet

Anne Southwell (1574 – 1636) [née Harris], later called Anne, Lady Southwell, was a poet. Her commonplace book includes a variety of works including political poems, sonnets, occasional verse, and letters to friends.

== Life ==
Southwell was born to Thomas and Elizabeth Harris of Cornworthy, Devon, where she was christened on 22 August 1574. Her brother was the prominent Irish judge Sir Edward Harris. Anne and her first husband moved to Ireland in the early seventeenth century, but little is known of their life there.

On 24 June 1594, she married Thomas Southwell of Norfolk at St Clement Danes in London; they had two daughters. She travelled to Berwick-upon-Tweed at the Union of the Crowns in 1603, hoping to meet Anne of Denmark. She became Anne, Lady Southwell, when Thomas was knighted in 1603. Her work suggests that she had some familiarity with the Court of James I of England, but apart from the knighthood, her husband received no preferment there.

Some time after her first husband's death in 1626, she married Captain Henry Sibthorpe, who was an army officer then serving in Ireland. For social reasons, she retained the name Southwell for the remainder of her life. They went to live at Clerkenwell in London and then moved in 1631 to a house they rented from the composer Robert Johnson. They both worked together to create a book that contained Anne's works and examples of texts by other writers. Southwell died in Acton in 1636. She has a monument in St Mary's Church, Acton.

== Poetry ==
Southwell's poetry typically involved contemplating theological concepts. For example, she devoted some poems to meditations on the Ten Commandments.

"An Elegie written by the Lady A: S: to the Countesse of London Derrye supposeinge hir to be dead by hir longe silence"

Southwell wrote this poem in 1626 to the Countess of Londonderry, Cicely MacWilliams. As a mock elegy, Southwell dedicates 120 lines to explorations of MacWilliams' physical body, the state of her soul, the Ptolemaic and Platonic heavens, and religious devotion. The poem echoes John Donne's Second Anniversaire: The Progress of the Soule as the speaker follows MacWilliams’ soul into the heavenly spheres.

Her internal colloquy begins in a specific address to MacWilliams’ bodily and spiritual experience, before she develops a broader description of the heavens and Catholic religious practices. As a metaphysical elegy, Southwell creates an image of a Ptolemaic and Platonic universe in which prayer should be dedicated to the Holy Trinity instead of Catholic saints.

Overall, this poem mocks MacWilliams for her lapse in correspondence and Southwell uses MacWilliams’ body and soul as vehicles for her heavenly and religious explorations. This poem deserves particular attention for its broad discussion of topics: Southwell discusses MacWilliams' own afterlife, but she also broaches the debate concerning transubstantiation as well as Neoplatonism and devotional practices.

== Death and legacy ==
Southwell was apparently buried at St Mary's Church, Acton and a plaque was mounted on the south wall. Two major manuscripts of her work survive, the collected folio in the Folger Shakespeare Library and one set of poems in the British Library. The folio is dated 20 December 1626 although it has been proposed that the book was started after Southwell's husband. It does appear to have been added to after her death. It is thought that it was presented to the Southwell family as a goodwill gesture by her second husband. The folio continued in the Southwell library until it was sold in 1834.

Of Southwell's daughters, Elizabeth, who married firstly Sir John Dowdall, and secondly Donough O'Brien, a younger son of the 1st Viscount Clare, is known for the spirited account she gave of her defence of Kilfinny Castle during the Irish Rebellion of 1641. A second daughter Frances was said to have married William Lenthal of Latchford in Oxfordshire, and been mother to William Lenthal, Speaker of Parliament during the Long Parliament. However, this identification is not compatible with the Speaker having been born in 1591.
