= Falkiner baronets =

There have been two baronetcies created for persons with the surname Falkiner, one in the Baronetage of Ireland and one in the Baronetage of the United Kingdom. As of 2026 the 1778 creation is extant, but dormant.

- Falkiner baronets of Anne Mount (1778)
- Falkiner baronets of Abbotstown (1812): see Sir Frederick Falkiner, 1st Baronet (1768–1824)
