= John Bennett (Irish politician) =

Irish politician, barrister and judge

John Bennett (c. 1720 – 1792) was an Irish politician, barrister and judge. His granddaughter married the celebrated writer Sheridan le Fanu.

== Early life ==
He was born in Cork, the son of George Bennett. William Henn of Paradise Hill, County Clare, a future colleague on the Bench, was his cousin. He was educated at Trinity College Dublin and at the Middle Temple. He was called to the Irish Bar in 1758. He entered politics but was not at first successful in his political career: although he was elected to the Irish House of Commons for Dungarvan in 1776, he was promptly unseated. In 1783 he stood for Parliament again both Castlemartyr and Charleville; he was successful in both contests and took his seat as member for Castelmartyr.

== Judge ==
His first judicial office was Recorder of Cork, although the precise dates between which he held this office are uncertain; most probably he was Recorder from 1783 to 1787. In the latter year, he was appointed a justice of the Court of King's Bench (Ireland) and held that office till his death in 1792.

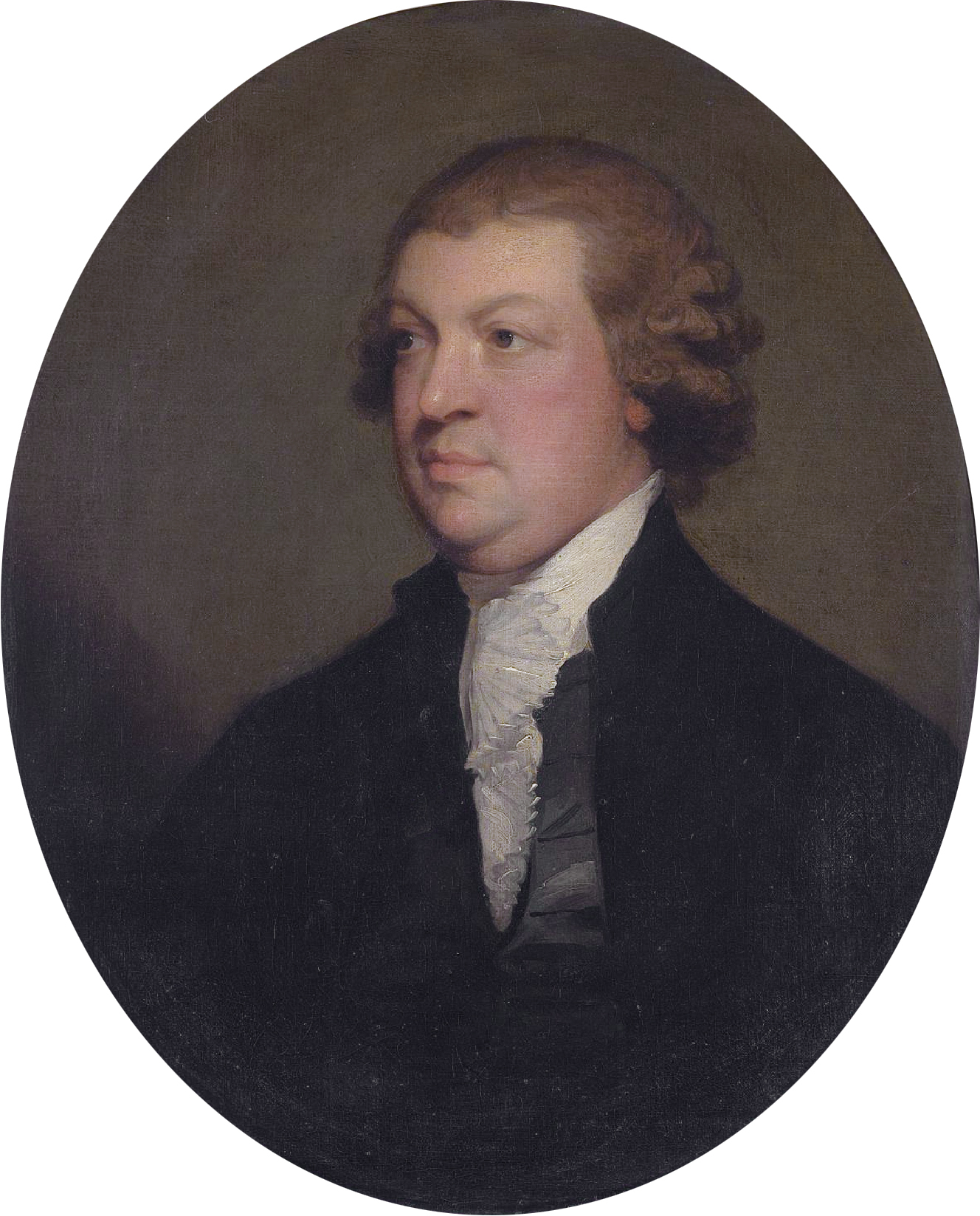
John Scott, 1st Earl of Clonmell, Bennett's Chief in the Court of King's Bench, who regarded him as an enemy.

Elrington Ball states that Bennett was a man noted for his independence of mind: as such he was bound to clash with the formidable Lord Chief Justice of Ireland, John Scott, 1st Earl of Clonmell. Scott was determined to dominate the Court of King's Bench. From the beginning of his tenure as Chief Justice, he regarded Bennett, who was not a man inclined to take a subservient role, as his enemy: "one adverse to me", and apparently tried to block his appointment to the Bench. Scott regarded another colleague, William Henn, Bennett's cousin, as "at best a fool". Only after Bennett's death and Henn's retirement was Scott able to remould his Court as he wished.

== Family ==
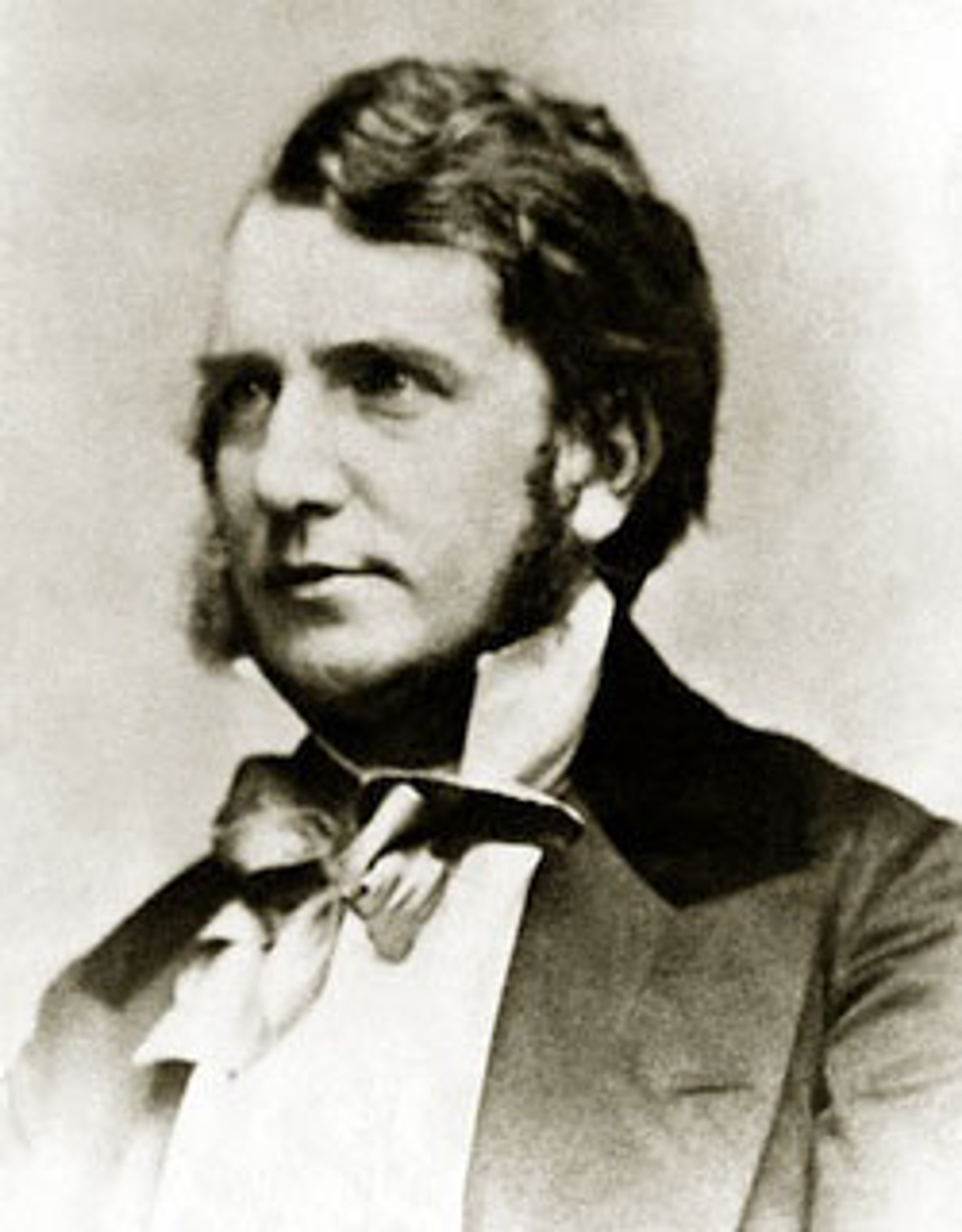
Sheridan Le Fanu, the celebrated author, the judge's grandson by marriage

Bennett married Jane Lovett, daughter of Jonathan Lovett senior, of the prominent landowning family of Liscombe Park, Soulbury, Buckinghamshire and Kingswell, County Tipperary, and his wife Eleanor (Ellen) Mansergh, daughter of Daniel Mansergh of Macroom, County Cork. Jane was the sister of Sir Jonathan Lovett (c.1730-1812), first and last of the Lovett baronets. They had several children, including:

- John Bennett junior, of Riverston, Nenagh, County Tipperary. He married Maria Elizabeth Crofts, and they had a daughter and heiress Jane, who married James Jocelyn Poe.
- George Bennett QC (1777-1856), nicknamed "the unbending Tory lawyer". He had several children, including Susanna (died 1858), who married the celebrated writer Sheridan le Fanu, and Jane (died 1860), who married Reverend Delves Broughton of Denbigh, and was the mother of another well-known writer, Rhoda Broughton.
- Jane, who married Richard Pennefather (1773-1859), Baron of the Court of Exchequer (Ireland) and had issue.
- Susan (Susannah), who married Samuel Francis Delap of Monellan Castle, County Donegal in March 1800. She died and was buried in Marly-le-Roi, France in 1825, leaving issue, including Reverend Robert Delap, who inherited Monellan Castle, and Mary Ann, who married Somerset Richard Maxwell, 8th Baron Farnham.

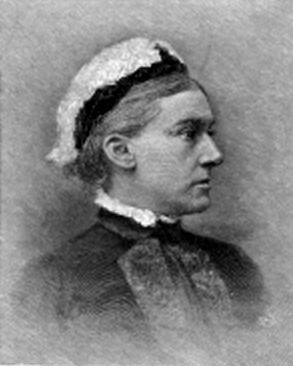
Rhoda Broughton, the well-known novelist; she was the judge's great-granddaughter
