= Valentine Greatrakes =

Irish faith healer (1628–1682)

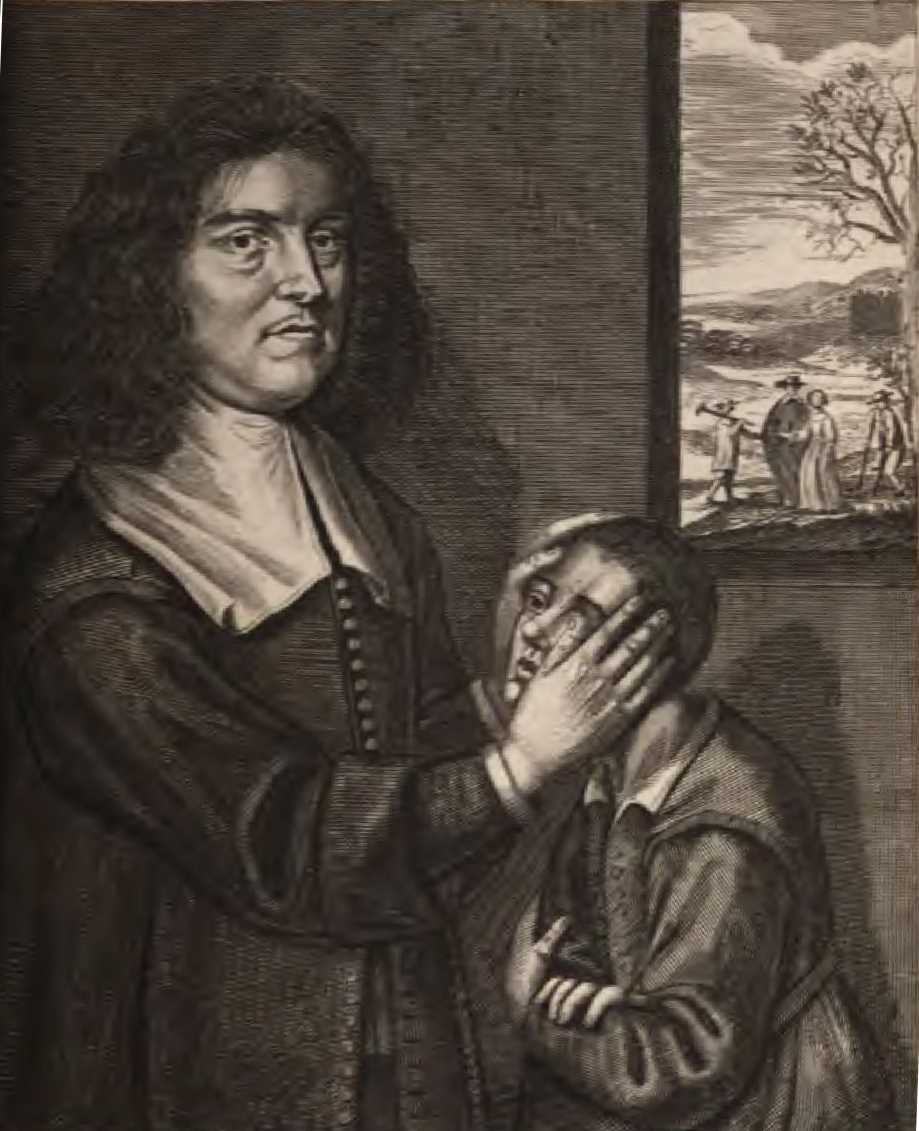
- Greatrakes exercising his power of faith healing
- Born: 14 February 1628
- Died: 28 November 1682 (aged 54)

Valentine Greatrakes (14 February 1628 – 28 November 1682), also known as "Greatorex" or "The Stroker", was an Irish faith healer who toured England in 1666, claiming to cure people by the laying on of hands.

== Early life ==
Greatrakes was born on 14 February 1628, at Affane, County Waterford, Ireland. He was the son of William Greatrakes (c. 1600–1643) and Mary Harris (died c. 1656), daughter of Sir Edward Harris, Chief Justice of Munster. Both his parents were English Protestant settlers. He went to the free school at Lismore until he was 13 years of age and was designed for the college of Dublin. However, when the Irish Rebellion of 1641 broke out he and his mother fled to England, where he was received by his great uncle, Edmund Harris. After Harris died his mother placed him with John Daniel Getsius, a German minister, of Stoke Gabriel, in Devonshire.

== War, the Commonwealth and Protectorate ==
After five or six years in England Greatrakes returned to his native country, which he found in a distracted state, and therefore spent a year in contemplation at the Castle of Cappoquin. In 1649 he was a lieutenant in Lord Broghill's regiment in the English Parliamentary army in Ireland, then campaigning in Munster against the Irish Royalists. In 1656, a great part of the army was disbanded, so Greatrakes retired to Affane, his native place, and was made clerk of the peace for County Cork, Register for transplantation, and a Justice of the Peace. However he lost these positions after the Restoration.

== Healer in Ireland ==
He seemed to have been very religious; his outlook was grave but simple. He said himself, that ever since that year 1662 he had felt a strange impulse or persuasion that he had the gift of curing the King's evil (scrofula); and this suggestion became so strong, that he stroked several persons, and cured them.

Three years after that, an epidemical fever was raging in the country, he was again persuaded that he could also cure that. He made the experiment, and he affirmed to his satisfaction that he cured all who came to him. At length, in April 1665, another kind of inspiration suggested to him, that he had the gift of healing wounds and ulcers; and experience, he also said, proved that he was not deceived. He even found that he cured convulsions, the dropsy, and many other distempers.

On 6 April 1665 Robert Phayre, a former Commonwealth Governor of County Cork, was living at Cahermore, in that county, when he was visited by Greatrakes (who had served in his regiment in 1649). Greatrakes cured Phayre in a few minutes of an acute ague. John Flamsteed, the famous Astronomer, (then aged 19) went over to Ireland, in August 1665, to be touched by Greatrakes for a natural weakness of constitution, but received no benefit. Crowds flocked to him from all parts, and he was reported to have performed such extraordinary cures, that he was summoned into the Bishop's court at Lismore, and, not having a licence for practising, was forbidden to lay hands on anyone else in Ireland.

== Journey to England ==
In 1665 Greatrakes was invited to England by his old commander, Lord Broghill (now Earl of Orrery), to cure Anne, Viscountess Conway of an inveterate headache. He arrived in England in early 1666 but failed to cure the Viscountess. Undaunted, he travelled through the country, treating the sick.

King Charles II, being informed of it, summoned Greatrakes to Whitehall. While unpersuaded that Greatrakes had miraculous power, the king did not forbid him to continue his ministrations.

Greatrakes went every day to a place in London where many sick persons, of all ranks in society, assembled. Pains, gout, rheumatism, convulsions and so forth were allegedly driven by his touch from one body part to another. Upon reaching the extremities, reportedly, all symptoms of these ailments ceased. As the treatment consisted entirely of stroking, Greatrakes was called The Stroker. Greatrakes ascribed certain disorders to the work of evil spirits. When persons possessed by such spirits saw Greatrakes or heard his voice, the afflicted fell to the ground or into violent agitation. He then proceeded to cure them by the same method of stroking.

While many were sceptical, Greatrakes did find zealous advocates for the efficacy of his healing powers. He himself published, in 1666, a letter addressed to the celebrated Robert Boyle entitled A brief Account of Mr. Valentine Greatrakes and divers of the strange Cures by him performed &c. See also The Miraculous Conformist &c. by Henry Stubbe, M.D., a pamphlet printed at Oxford in 1666, wherein the author gives a succinct history of Greatrakes' life. Appended to the pamphlet were a number of certificates, signed by persons of known probity, attesting to the reality of Greatrakes' cures.

== Return to Ireland and farming ==
Greatrakes returned to Ireland in 1667, and resumed farming in 1668 on £1,000 a year. Although he lived for many years, he no longer kept up the reputation of performing those strange cures which made him a name. However, his case is very singular, that on the strictest enquiry no sort of blemish was ever thrown upon his character, nor did any of those curious and learned persons, who espoused his cause, draw any imputation upon themselves.

Greatrakes died on 28 November 1682 at Affane, County Waterford. He may be buried in Lismore Church or under the aisle of the old Affane Church near to his father (sources vary).

== Skeptical reception ==
Charles Mackay, in his Extraordinary Popular Delusions and the Madness of Crowds (1841), wrote that:

"Mr Valentine Greatraks, who, without mentioning magnetism, or laying claim to any theory, practised upon himself and others a deception much more akin to the animal magnetism of the present day than the mineral magnetism it was then so much the fashion to study."

James Randi, citing Mackay in his book The Faith Healers also considered Greatrakes to be a quack, who had deceived himself.

== Family ==
In the early 1660s Greatrakes married Ruth (died 1678), daughter of Sir William Godolphin (1605–1663), and his first wife Ruth, daughter of Sir John Lambe. He married secondly Alice Tilson (died 1678 or 1684). He had three children:

- Williman (died 1686), who married Mary, daughter of Johah Wheeler.
- Edmund (died during 1691–1692), who married Anne, daughter of Thomas Wilcox.
- Mary, who married Edmund Browning.
