= Edward Harris (Irish judge) =

English judge in Ireland

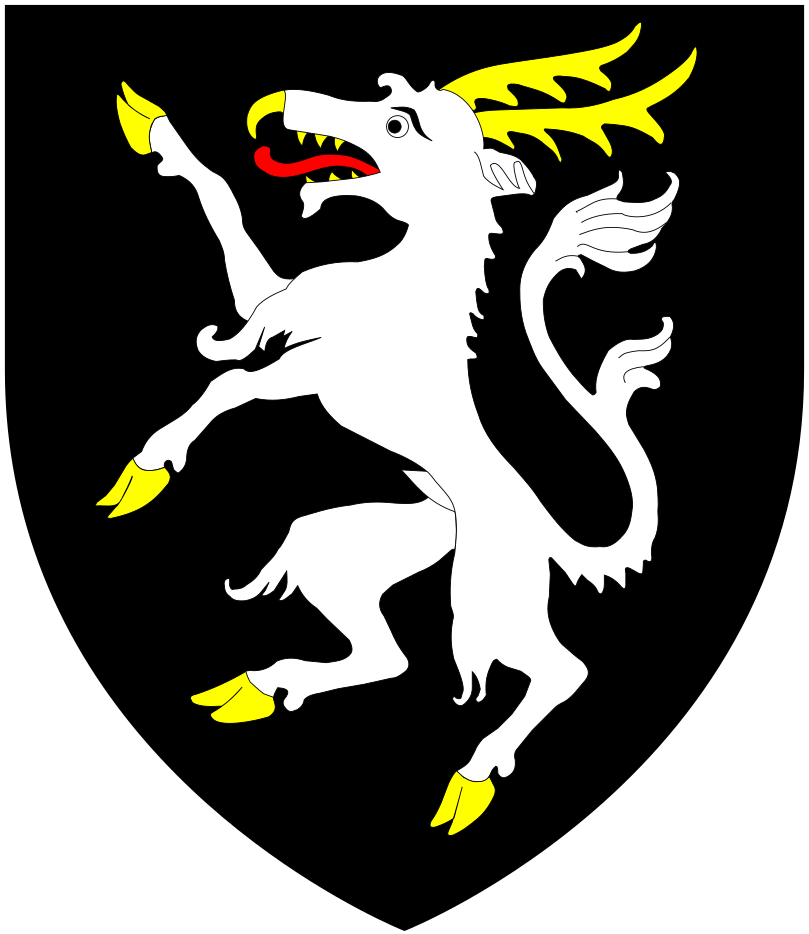
Arms of Harris of Cornworthy: Sable, an antelope salient argent armed and crined or

Sir Edward Harris (1575–1636) of Cornworthy in Devon, was an English-born judge and politician in seventeenth-century Ireland. He was Chief Justice of Munster in Ireland, and sat as Member of Parliament for Clonakilty 1613–1615 in the Irish House of Commons of the Parliament of Ireland. He was the grandfather of the faith healer Valentine Greatrakes, and brother of the poet Lady Anne Southwell.

Elrington Ball describes him as a man who acquired "both wealth and friends" in Ireland. He was given to the ostentatious display of his riches, and often wore a valuable jewel on a gold chain. He was a devoted father, especially to his daughters.

== Origins ==
He was born at Cornworthy in Devon, eldest son and heir of Sir Thomas Harris of Cornworthy Priory, serjeant-at-law, by his wife Elizabeth Pomeroy (d.1634), daughter of Henry Pomeroy, who was a member of the ancient Anglo-Norman de Pomeroy family, feudal barons of Berry Pomeroy of Berry Pomeroy near Cornworthy. Sir Thomas Harris was called by his contemporary the Devon historian Tristram Risdon (d.1640) "a man much commended for his pregnant wit and learning". He sat in the House of Commons for many years, where he was noted both for his eloquence in debate and his diligence in committee.

Sir Thomas Harris's father was Edward Harris (d. 1592), son of Walter Harris of Monmouthshire. The elder Edward had purchased Cornworthy Priory at the Dissolution of the Monasteries. Edward's elder sister, Anne (1574-1636), became, on her first marriage to Sir Thomas Southwell, Anne, Lady Southwell. She was a noted poet.

== Career ==
Edward entered Middle Temple in 1598 and was called to the bar in 1599. In 1608 he was sent to Ireland as Chief Justice of Munster. From the beginning of his Irish career he was a close associate and personal friend of Richard Boyle, 1st Earl of Cork, who having emigrated from England in 1588, became the dominant political figure in Munster, and a major force in national Irish politics. As Lord Cork's nominee, Harris sat in the Irish House of Commons in the Irish Parliament of 1613–15 as one of the two members for Clonakilty, a borough which had just been created at Lord Cork's instigation, as part of his plan to build a political "empire" in the south of Ireland. To be a serving judge in Ireland was not at the time a barrier to sitting in Parliament, though it was in England, and several High Court judges sat in the House of Commons in that session. Harris received a special grant of land for his "extraordinary services to the Crown", and he was knighted in 1619. In 1623 he was appointed a Justice of the Court of King's Bench in Ireland. The following year he was greatly saddened by the death of his favourite daughter Elizabeth Lancaster in childbirth: he erected a memorial to her at Kinsalebeg Church, near Ferrypoint in County Waterford. He was Treasurer of the King's Inn in 1632.

== Marriage and children ==
He married twice:

- Firstly to Elizabeth Fowell (d.1622), a daughter of Richard Fowell (d.1594) of Fowelscombe in the parish of Ugborough in Devon and his wife Grace Somester, by whom he had seven surviving children, including:
  - Sir Thomas Harris "the younger", his eldest son and heir, of Cornworthy, who died in 1642 or 1643.
  - Mary Harris (died c.1656), who married William Greatrakes (c. 1600-1643), and was the mother of faith healer Valentine Greatrakes.
  - Phillipa Harris, who married Robert Tynte, son of Anglo-Irish politician Sir Robert Tynte of Youghal, and was the ancestor of the Tynte baronets of Wicklow,
  - Elizabeth Harris (died 1624), who married the Rev. John Lancaster, prebendary of Waterford, son of John Lancaster, who was Bishop of Waterford and Lismore 1608-19, and had issue John (died 1683).
  - Arthur Harris (died 1640), married Philippa, who after his death fought a lengthy legal battle against her in-laws.
  - Edmund Harris (died 1643).
- Secondly to Jane Bussey, daughter of John Bussey (c. 1533-1594) of Heydour, Lincolnshire and his wife Elizabeth Poole, natural daughter of Sir Henry Poole of Withcote. Jane was the widow of Sir Richard Waldron (d.1617) of Farnham, County Cavan, by whom she had numerous children. His second marriage brought Edward a considerable addition to his wealth, including a stud farm at Farnham.

All his sons had died childless before 1645, at which time his female heirs were involved in bitter and protracted litigation over the inheritance.

== Death and burial ==
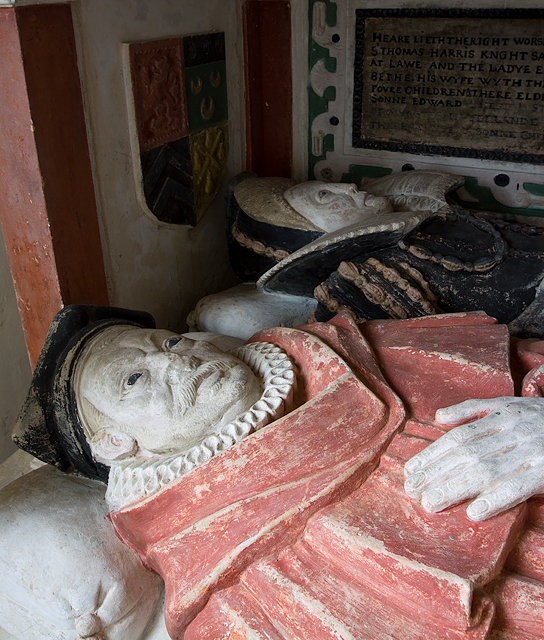
Tomb of Edward's parents Sir Thomas and Elizabeth Harris in St Peter's Church, Cornworthy. Edward himself is probably buried here as well

He died in County Cork in 1636 and was buried in Kilcredan cemetery, near Ladysbridge, County Cork. It seems probable, from the inscription which was later added to the impressive monument to his father which still survives in St Peter's Church, Cornworthy, that he was re-interred at Cornworthy. The inscription is as follows:

Here lieth the Right Worshipful Sr Thomas Harris Knight Sargat at Lawe And The Ladye Elizabeth His wife Wyth There Foure Children. There Eldest Sonne Edward Chief Justice of Munster in Irelande, There seconde Sonne Christopher Slayne in the Warres at Zealand in Flaunder and Their Eldest daughter Anne married to Sr Thomas Souphwell a Knight of Suffolk. And Their youngest Daughter Honer Married to Sr Hugh Harris a Knight of Scotland.

A monument (now very badly damaged) to Edward Harris and his first wife Elizabeth Fowell still stands in the ruins of Kilcredan Church in Cork.

His will, as was common in that era, was a source of great contention among his family, and led to decades of litigation between his heirs. Philippa, the widow of his son Arthur, filed a lawsuit against his surviving daughters, Mary Greatrakes and Philippa Tynte, and his grandson John Lancaster, son of Elizabeth Lancaster, claiming that she had been deprived of her rights under Sir Edward's will.

== Sources ==
- Ball, F. Elrington The Judges in Ireland 1221-1921 London John Murray 1926
- Kenny, Colum The King's Inns and the Kingdom of Dublin Irish Academic Press Dublin 1992
- Elmer, Peter The Miraculous Conformist-Valentine Greatrakes, the Body Politic and the politics of healing in Restoration Britain Oxford University Press 2012
- Fraser's Magazine Vol. XXIII 1845
