= Robert Travers (MP) =

Irish mp and knight

Sir Robert Travers (c. 1596 – 13 November 1647) was an Irish judge, soldier and politician of the early seventeenth century. Despite his unenviable reputation for corruption, he had a highly successful career until the outbreak of the Wars of the Three Kingdoms, when he went into opposition to King Charles I. He fought on the side of the Irish Parliament, and was killed at the Battle of Knocknanuss. He was a nephew of the poet Edmund Spenser, and was the founder of a notable military dynasty.

== Background ==
Robert was born in County Cork about 1596, the eldest son of John Travers of Ballinamona, who was Registrar of the Consistory Court of Cork and of the Diocese of Ross, and his wife Sarah Spenser, sister of Edmund Spenser. His grandfather is recorded as one Brian Travers who came to Ireland from Lancashire in the middle of the sixteenth century. However, there is little evidence for this and a number of writers dispute the link to the Lancashire family. Sarah Spenser came to Ireland in about 1588 to keep house for her brother Edmund, who after the downfall of the Earl of Desmond was granted a part of the Desmond inheritance, including Kilcolman Castle. Edmund granted a portion of his lands to John and Sarah as a wedding gift. Both were buried at Cork in Saint Fin Barre's Cathedral, where Robert erected a memorial to them, but the building has been so much altered since then that no trace of the memorial survives. A St. Fin Barre’s chapter record dated 2 September 1623 shows that George Lee, Dean, and the Chapter, granted to Robert Travers, of Mooretown, in Ibawn, Esq., a place of burial in the south side of the chancel of our Church, next the south wall at the window now the most eastern of the same side, in which place John Travers, father of the said Robert, as well as Sara Spenser, als. Travers, mother of Robert, with his paternal grandmother, as also his two brothers are buried. In which place the said Robert, with our consent, heretofore had erected a marble tomb; until the next walls of the ruin being destroyed through age, in order that they may be repaired anew, the said monument was removed for a time for the sake of safety. The record notes that Sara Spenser is said to have been a sister of the poet.

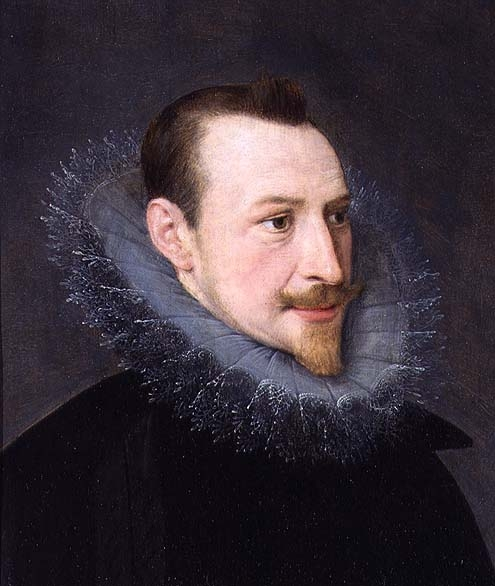
Travers' uncle, the poet Edmund Spenser

== Early career ==
Robert was educated at the University of Oxford, and took there a degree in civil law. Since most though not all of the commanders in the Wars of the Three Kingdoms had seen military service, it is possible that he served as a soldier for a time. Unusually for the eldest son of a landowning family, he decided on a full-time legal career (this was a more common choice for a younger son). He practised mainly in the ecclesiastical and Admiralty courts. He won praise for his legal ability, but also gained a reputation for corruption which stayed with him throughout his life. He became Vicar General of the Diocese of Meath, but so many accusations of extortion, of the taking of bribes and of misappropriation of funds were made against him that in 1621 he was prosecuted in the Court of Castle Chamber (the Irish parallel to Star Chamber), and was found guilty of bribery. He was fined £300 and ordered to be imprisoned at the Crown's pleasure.

Castle Chamber was never very effective in enforcing its orders, and the sentence of imprisonment was never carried out. Even so, it is surprising that Travers' conviction did not result in his professional disgrace: on the contrary, he continued in legal practice and was knighted in 1625. Most likely he owed his immunity to his powerful friends, especially Richard Boyle, 1st Earl of Cork, whose cousin Elizabeth Boyle he later married.

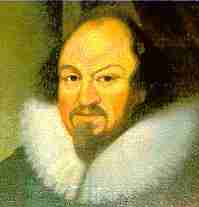
Richard Boyle, 1st Earl of Cork, Travers patron

== Judge ==
In the early 1620s he was appointed Deputy to Sir Lawrence Parsons, the Irish Admiralty Judge, and was also made judge of the provincial Admiralty Court in Munster. Here again he became notorious for taking bribes and for keeping prizes for himself. By 1625 Sir Edward Villiers, who was briefly Lord President of Munster, was writing in despair that the Crown could not trust the conduct of the Admiralty to "such a one" as Travers, and referred pointedly to his Castle Chamber conviction for corruption. Villiers urged that Henry Gosnold, Travers' predecessor, who had a reputation for integrity, be restored to office. Gosnold did return to the Admiralty Court in the 1630s, but during the Civil War found himself unable to exercise his judicial functions. The Parliament of Ireland set up a rival court at Kinsale with Travers as its judge; not surprisingly, further accusations of corruption were made against him.

== Politics ==
He entered the Irish House of Commons in 1634 as member for Clonakilty. Since the town of Clonakilty was Lord Cork's own creation (he obtained its charter in 1612), there is no doubt that Travers was the Earl's nominee. This Parliament had been called by the formidable Lord Lieutenant of Ireland, Thomas Wentworth, 1st Earl of Strafford, who for several years was virtually all-powerful in Ireland. Lord Cork's initial friendly overtures to Strafford were firmly rebuffed: Strafford was determined to establish King Charles I's absolute authority in Ireland, and to achieve this he believed that it was necessary to curb Cork's power and influence. Lord Cork in return worked patiently for Strafford's destruction, and in May 1641 was able to write grimly in his diary: "the Earl of Strafford was beheaded on Tower Hill, as he well deserved".

Travers was returned to the House of Commons in 1639, again for Clonakilty, and was clearly identified as an opponent of Strafford. He signed the Remonstrance of November 1640 in which the Irish Parliament, having previously lavished praise on Strafford, now accused him of tyranny and corruption without parallel in Irish history. Travers was active in the Commons in 1641, especially in pressing home the attack on Strafford. Like most Irish and English MPs, he seems to have believed that, once Stafford was brought down, the King would be able to reach a compromise with the English and Irish Parliaments.

== Civil War and death ==
The outbreak of the Irish Rebellion of 1641 showed that any hope of a peaceful settlement was an illusion. Travers, like all Protestant landowners in Ireland, now feared for his lands and his life.

The Irish Parliament was deeply suspicious of the King's attitude to the Irish Confederacy. The rebels claimed to have the King's approval for their actions, and although this was probably untrue, it is clear that Charles never ruled out the possibility of employing the Confederate Army. Parliament's suspicions were confirmed by the Cessation of 1643, whereby James Butler, 1st Duke of Ormonde, the Irish Royalist commander, signed a ceasefire with the Confederates, which was repeatedly renewed. Ultimately, Parliament was driven to fight the King as well as the Confederates.

=== Knocknanuss ===
The Parliamentary and Confederate armies clashed decisively at the Battle of Knocknanuss, near Mallow, County Cork, on 13 November 1647. Travers had been appointed the Parliamentary Army's Judge Advocate and he commanded a division. The battle was bloody and although Travers' side was victorious, he was killed.

== Family ==
He married first in 1618 Catherine, daughter of Gerald Nangle of Kildalkey and his wife Anne Scurlock; their only child seems to have died young. Before 1638, he married secondly Elizabeth, daughter of Richard Boyle, Archbishop of Tuam, a first cousin of the Earl of Cork, and his wife Martha Wight. By this second marriage, he had four children:

- John (died 1712), his father's heir, who married Mary Scudamore.
- Richard (died 1700), who married Eleanor Stawell and inherited the lands of his uncle Zachary Travers of Garrycloyne Castle, near Blarney. Their granddaughter Eleanor Travers married her distant cousin Eaton Stannard (1685-1755), the popular eighteenth-century Recorder of Dublin and a close friend of Jonathan Swift.
- Elizabeth, who married Colonel William Meade of Ballintober and had at least twelve children, including Sir John Meade, 1st Baronet. Her daughter Eleanor Meade was the fourth wife of Godwin Swift, the uncle of Jonathan Swift and cousin of John Dryden, while another daughter, Joanna, was the grandmother of Jonathan Swift's protégée Laetitia Pilkington.
- Martha, who married first Captain Robert Stannard of Kilmallock (died 1655) and secondly in 1656 Sir Richard Aldworth of Newmarket, having children from both marriages; Eaton Stannard was her grandson. Her daughter Elizabeth Stannard married the prominent Anglican cleric and diarist Rowland Davies, Dean of Cork, in 1674, while her son Boyle Aldworth was High Sheriff of County Cork in 1693.

Some genealogies also show a third daughter, Alice, who married Sir John Philpot of Newmarket and was the maternal grandmother of Charles Bunworth.

Both of Sir Robert's sons founded long-lasting branches of the Travers family, which was associated mainly with Timoleague, County Cork. Many of Robert's descendants were distinguished soldiers: the most notable of them were General Sir Robert Travers (1770–1834) and his son General James Travers (1820-1884).
