= Battle of Knocknanuss =

1647 battle of the Irish Confederate Wars

Coordinates: 52.52°N 7.89°W

- Part of the Irish Confederate Wars
Date	13 November 1647
Location	Knocknanauss, County Cork
Result	Parliamentarian victory

Belligerents
English Parliamentarians	Irish Confederates: Redshanks

Commanders and leaders
Baron Inchiquin	Earl of Carlingford; Alastair MacColla †

Strength
6,000 foot 1,200 horse	7,000 foot 1,200 horse

Casualties and losses
Up to 1,000	Over 3,000

Ireland and Knocknanuss

The Battle of Knocknanauss was fought in 1647, during the Irish Confederate Wars, part of the Wars of the Three Kingdoms, between Confederate Ireland’s Munster army and an English Parliamentarian army under Murrough O’Brien. The battle resulted in a crushing defeat for the Irish Confederates.

== Background ==
In the summer of 1647, Murrough O’Brien (later created the Earl of Inchiquin), commander of the English Parliamentarian forces in Cork, ravaged and burned the Confederate territory in Munster. This caused severe food shortages and earned O’Brien the Irish nickname, Murchadh an Dóiteáin, "Murrough the Burner" In addition, Inchiquinn took the Rock of Cashel, which was garrisoned by Confederate troops and rich in emotive religious symbolism. In the sack of the castle, O’Brien's troops massacred the garrison and all the clergy they found there.

The Confederates' Munster army was incapable of stopping O’Brien because of political infighting between officers who supported a deal with the English Royalists and those who rejected such a deal. Eventually, in reaction to the sack of Cashel and famine conditions, the Confederate Supreme Council replaced Donagh MacCarthy, Viscount Muskerry, as commander of the Munster army with Viscount Taaffe and ordered him to bring O’Brien to battle.

Taaffe was an English Catholic and not an experienced soldier. Although he had an excellent contingent of veteran troops under Alasdair MacColla, most of his men were similarly inexperienced. Furthermore, the Irish troops were demoralised by the internal factionalism in their ranks and most of them had little loyalty to Taafe. O’Brien, on the other hand, had been commanding his force since 1642 and was well-experienced in battle. His troops were a mixture of well-trained Parliamentarian soldiers from England and British settlers who had been driven from their homes in the Irish Rebellion of 1641. The two armies met at Knocknanuss near Mallow, approximately 29 kilometres north of Cork.

== Battle ==
The battle that followed was essentially an uncoordinated rout of the Irish forces. Taaffe positioned his men on either side of a hill, so that they could not see one another. The result was that one wing of the Confederate army had no idea of what the other wing was doing. MacColla's men charged the Parliamentarians opposite them putting them to flight and killing a large number of them. Thinking the battle was over, they then took to looting the enemy's baggage train.

However, on the other wing, O’Brien's cavalry had charged the raw Irish horsemen, causing them to run away. Despite Taaffe's desperate attempt to rally them, the Irish infantry followed suit, many of them being cut down by the pursuing roundheads. The pursuit continued for miles and not only resulted in heavy casualties among the Irish, but also in the loss of most of their equipment and supplies. Inchiquin lost several senior officers, including the Judge-Advocate, Sir Robert Travers. MacColla and his men surrendered when they realised what had happened but were subsequently killed by their captors. Around 3,000 Confederates died at Knocknanauss, and up to 1,000 English Parliamentarians. The carnage did not stop after the fighting was finished. The next day a couple of hundred Irish soldiers were found sheltering in a nearby wood. These were promptly put to the sword.

== Outcome ==
When combined with the battle of Dungans Hill in County Meath, the defeat led to the collapse of the Confederate Catholic cause and forced them to make a deal with the English Royalists.

== See also ==
- Confederate Ireland
- Irish battles
