= Joshua Boyle (politician) =

Joshua Boyle was a Member of Parliament in the Irish House of Commons, initially elected to represent the borough of Mallow in 1641, and was sworn in as recorder of Youghal on 1 March of the same year.

The esquire of Castle Lyons, he was elected to represent the borough of Clonakilty on 8 April 1661.

"Joshua Boyle Esq. of Castle Lyons" was again listed as having been elected the MP to represent Mallow ninety years after the first election, though it is assumed to have been a relative of the now-deceased original Boyle.
