= Clonakilty (Parliament of Ireland constituency) =

Pre-1801 Irish constituency

- Former borough constituency for the Irish House of Commons
- County: County Cork
- Borough: Clonakilty

1613–1801
- Seats: 2
- Replaced by: Disfranchised

Clonakilty was a constituency in County Cork represented in the Irish House of Commons until its abolition on 1 January 1801.

== History ==
Established by a charter of King James I of England granting it to Sir Richard Boyle, it was purchased from Lord Burlington by Speaker Boyle in 1738 and he nominated the provost from three burgesses elected by the Corporation and freemen. In the Patriot Parliament of 1689 summoned by James II, Clonakilty was represented with two members. In the 1783 election 7 voted. It was disenfranchised by the Acts of Union 1800 and Lord Shannon received compensation of £15,000. It was sometimes known as Cloghnakilty.

== Members of Parliament, 1613–1801 ==
Election	First MP	Second MP
1613	Sir Edward Harris	Sir Henry Gosnold
1634	Sir Robert Travers	Philip Mainwaring
1639	Sir Robert Travers	Peregrine Banastre
1661	Joshua Boyle	Arthur Freke
1689	Owen MacCarthy	Daniel Fionn MacCarthy
1692	Francis Bernard	Percy Freke
1695	Bryan Townsend	Percy Freke
1703	Ralph Freke	George Freke
1713	Richard Cox	George Freke
1725	Francis Bernard	George Freke
1727	Francis Bernard	Richard Cox (Note: Succeeded as 2nd Baronet in 1733)
1761	Viscount Boyle (Note: Also elected for County Cork in 1761, for which he chose to sit)	Richard Cox
May 1761	Henry Sheares	Richard Cox
1766	Henry Sheares	Matthew Parker
1768	Richard Longfield	Riggs Falkiner
1776	Thomas Adderley	Attiwell Wood
1784	Thomas Adderley	Charles O'Neill
1792	Sir Nicholas Colthurst, 3rd Bt	Charles O'Neill
1793	Sir Nicholas Colthurst, 3rd Bt	Viscount Boyle
1796	Thomas Prendergast	Viscount Boyle
1797	Thomas Prendergast	John Hobson
1801	Disenfranchised	

== Bibliography ==
- O'Hart, John (2007). The Irish and Anglo-Irish Landed Gentry: When Cromwell came to Ireland. Vol. II. Heritage Books. ISBN 0-7884-1927-7.
- Johnston-Liik, E. M. (2002). History of the Irish Parliament, 1692–1800, Publisher: Ulster Historical Foundation (28 Feb 2002), ISBN 1-903688-09-4
- T. W. Moody, F. X. Martin, F. J. Byrne, A New History of Ireland 1534-1691, Oxford University Press, 1978
- Tim Cadogan and Jeremiah Falvey, A Biographical Dictionary of Cork, 2006, Four Courts Press ISBN 1-84682-030-8
- Leigh Rayment's historical List of Members of the Irish House of Commons. Cites: Johnston-Liik, Edith Mary (2002). The History of the Irish Parliament 1692-1800 (6 volumes). Ulster Historical Foundation.
