= Langrishe =

Langrishe is a surname. Notable people with the surname include:

- Langrishe Baronets of Knocktopher Abbey, Kilkenny, Ireland
  - Hercules Langrishe, 1st Baronet (1729–1811) politician
- Caroline Langrishe (b. 1958) English actress
- Jack Langrishe (1825–1895) Irish-born American actor and impresario
- May Langrishe (1864–1939), Irish tennis player, first Irish champion
- John Du Plessis Langrishe FRSE (1883–1947)

== See also ==
- Langrishe, Go Down 1966 novel by Aidan Higgins
- Langrish (surname)
