= Sir Thomas Staples, 9th Baronet =

Anglo-Irish politician & lawyer (1775-1865)

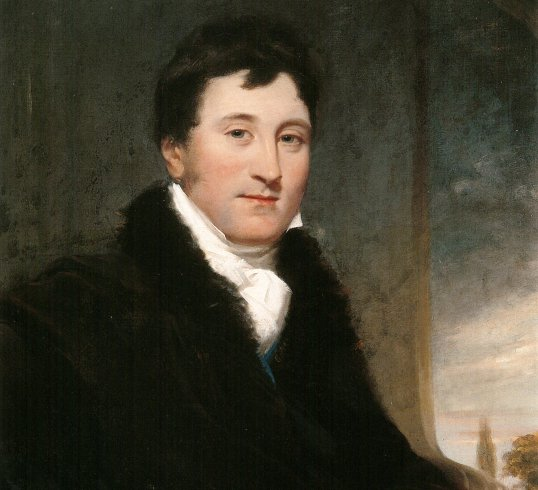

Sir Thomas Staples, 9th Baronet (31 July 1775 – 14 May 1865) was an Anglo-Irish politician and lawyer. He was the last surviving person to have been a member of the Irish House of Commons, albeit only having been in the House for a short time.

Staples was the son of John Staples and Henrietta Molesworth, a daughter of Richard Molesworth, 3rd Viscount Molesworth. Between March and April 1800 he was the Member of Parliament for Knocktopher in the Irish House of Commons, before resigning. In 1832 he inherited his cousin's baronetcy. Staples was a barrister in Dublin and was appointed a Queen's Advocate in Ireland in 1845.

He lived at Lissan House. Staples married Catherine Hawkins, daughter and heiress of Reverend John Hawkins and Anne Montgomery, on 27 October 1813; they had no children and his title was inherited by his nephew.

Parliament of Ireland
Preceded by Sir George Shee, Bt; Sir Hercules Langrishe, Bt	Member of Parliament for Knocktopher; March–April 1800; With: Sir George Shee, Bt	Succeeded by Sir George Shee, Bt; Stephen Mahon
Baronetage of Ireland
Preceded by Robert Staples	Baronet (of Lissan); 1832–1865	Succeeded by Nathaniel Staples
