= George Edward Dering =

George Edward Dering (1831–1911) was a British inventor and eccentric.

== Early life and career ==
His father was Robert Dering and his mother Leititia was the daughter of Sir George Shee, 1st Baronet (1754–1825). He was educated at Rugby School. He inherited the manor of Lockleys, Welwyn, Hertfordshire from his father in 1859 and an estate in Dunmore, County Galway estate from his uncle Sir George Shee, 2nd Baronet (1784–1870).

Dering gained an interest in telegraphy from his teacher Henry Highton. He invented a signal detector using a needle suspended to swing like a pendulum in 1850. This detector was used by the Bank of England in its company communication system on Threadneedle Street. The Electric Telegraph Company of Ireland used the system in 1852, and Dering was made a company director. Further use was made in experiments by European Telegraph company between London and Dover, and on Great Northern Railway.

== Personal life ==
He was interested in a range of scientific and technical subjects, obtaining some twenty patents relating to telegraphy, chemistry, iron- and brick-making. His principal interest was electricity: he had a standing order with booksellers for books on the subject and amassed a huge collection, subsequently bought by Theodore Newton Vail and presented to Massachusetts Institute of Technology. One of the booksellers that sold to him was David Nutt. He had standing orders for all publications on a number of subjects including electricity but also magnetism, animal magnetism, and aeronautics. Other subjects that entered into his collection had to do with the occult, witchcraft, demonology, and magic. He accumulated so many books that thousands of volumes were still in unopened shipping cartons when Dering died. He also acquired the Cuthbert aeronautical collection, eventually presented to the Royal Aeronautical Society. A portion of the Cuthbert aeronautical collection was also acquired by Vail for MIT.

Another of his interests was tight-rope walking. He was a friend of Charles Blondin and practised with him over the River Mimram on his estate.

His personal life and behaviour were eccentric. He was insistent on peace and quiet and paid for roads to be moved that ran too near his house. Around 1880, he disappeared from Lockleys, returning once a year to oversee the estate and finally returning again permanently in 1907. It transpired that he had been living in Brighton under another name, and had a family who had no knowledge of his real name and fortune.

He died in 1911 and his estates were inherited by relatives: Lockleys went to his daughter, Mrs. Neall.

== Publications ==
- Magnetism: A Sketch of the History and Principles of the Science and Its Various Useful Applications, Including Those of the Mariner's Compass and Electric Telegraph : a Lecture Delivered at the Hatfield Mutual Improvement Society, January 31st, 1853, Hatfield Mutual Improvement Society, 1853
