= Shee baronets =

Extinct baronetcy in the Baronetage of Ireland

- Escutcheon of the Shee baronets of Dunmore
- Creation date: 1794
- Status: extinct
- Extinction date: 1870

The Shee Baronetcy, of Dunmore in the County of Galway, was a title in the Baronetage of Ireland. It was created on 22 January 1794 for George Shee, who subsequently represented Knocktopher in the Irish House of Commons. The title became extinct on the death of the second Baronet in 1870.

== Shee baronets, of Dunmore (1794) ==
- Sir George Shee, 1st Baronet (1754–1825)
- Sir George Shee, 2nd Baronet (1785–1870)
