= Hazel Dolling =

British châtelaine

- Born: 13 June 1923
- Died: 24 April 2006 (aged 82)
- Education: School of St Mary and St Anne, Abbots Bromley, Staffordshire
- Spouse: Harry Dolling (1970-1986; his death)

Hazel Marion Radclyffe Dolling (née Staples; 13 June 1923–24 April 2006) was the châtelaine of Lissan House, a stately home near Cookstown, Northern Ireland. Lissan is set at the foot of the Sperrin Mountains. Dolling was the last surviving member of the Staples family.

== Life ==
Her father was Sir Robert Staples, 13th Baronet of Lissan and Faughanvale. Her grandfather was Sir Robert Staples, 12th Baronet, who was a well-known painter.

She was educated at the School of St Mary and St Anne, Staffordshire, England. She then worked as an air radio mechanic during World War II and was a third officer in the Women's Royal Naval Service.

Afterwards she worked as an assistant purser on the Southampton-New York route of the Cunard Line ships, RMS Mauretania, RMS Queen Mary and RMS Caronia (1947). Later, she owned a travel agency in Liverpool. After selling it, she moved to London. In 1970 her father died, and she married his land agent Harry Holbeche Radclyffe Dolling, who was 30 years older than she was. He was also a cousin. They moved to Lissan House to live with Hazel's mother. Harry Dolling died in 1986 and Hazel Dolling lived the rest of her life alone at Lissan without electricity, excepting that which was generated by the water turbine (which had been purchased second hand in 1902) at her house. She had to use a gas canister to cook food. When she went driving down her 1-mile-long avenue she always kept a chainsaw in her car boot in case the avenue was blocked by any trees that had fallen. She once attempted to create a bank account, and was told to bring an electricity bill for identity purposes. She replied "but I have never had an electricity bill."

== Restoration ==
In 2003, Lissan House was a candidate in the BBC 2 television show, Restoration. The prize was a £3,000,000 grant from the Heritage Lottery Fund to restore the winning building for use by the public. Instead of a celebrity making the case for the funding, she decided to try to persuade viewers to choose her home as the grant-winner. The Irish Independent described Mrs Dolling as a "natural television performer". Lissan House reached the final, but was very narrowly defeated by the Victoria Baths in Manchester.

Following the programme, Hazel oversaw the re-founding of the Friends of Lissan Trust (now the Lissan House Trust), in 2004. The Charitable Trust had originally been founded on 5 August 1997 with the aim of finding a sustainable future for the Lissan Estate which kept it at the heart of the local community.

== Death and legacy ==
Hazel Dolling died in 2006, aged 82, after a long battle with cancer. Before her death she donated her home, Lissan House, its contents and Estate to The Friends of Lissan House,. The trust has received a £45,000 grant from the Heritage Lottery Fund; it is believed that the restoration work will cost £5,000,000. In August 2006 it was revealed that there are plans for "tourist, community and heritage facilities".

In 2010, the first phase of restoration took place, securing the fabric of the house and restoring its exterior.
