= Lissan House =

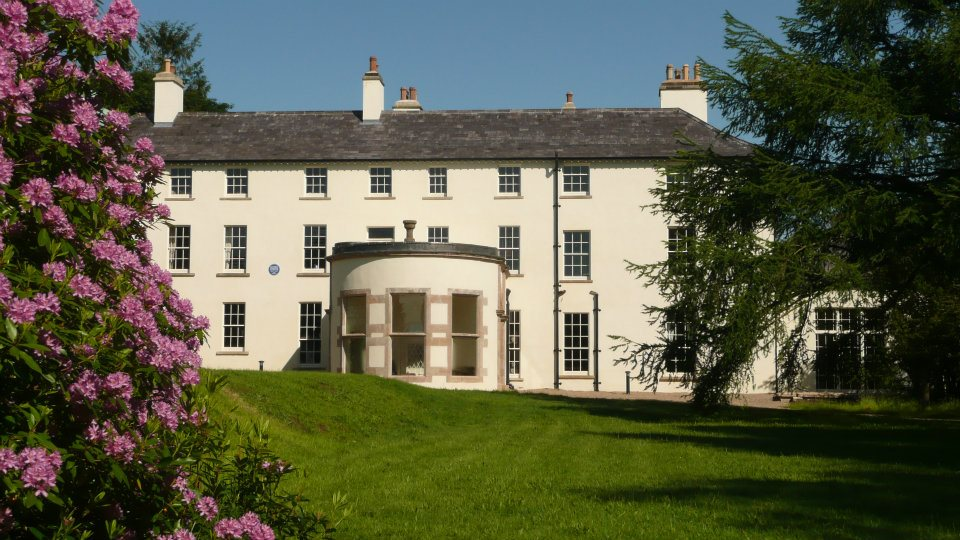
- Lissan House

- Location within Northern Ireland

General information
- Type: House
- Architectural style: Ulster Plantation House with Georgian and Victorian additions
- Location: Cookstown, County Tyrone
- Coordinates: 54.682702°N 6.764539°W
- Construction started: Evidence of building on site c.1580; first constructed c.1620; reconstructed c.1690 with notable alterations in c.1780, c.1840 and c.1880
- Governing body: Lissan House Trust

Design and construction
- Architect: Alterations by Davis Ducart

Website
- http://www.lissanhouse.com

Lissan House is a historic house and tourist attraction in County Tyrone, Northern Ireland, that was the seat of the Staples baronets. Lissan lies nestled at the foot of the Sperrin Mountains amid ancient woodland near the historic market town of Cookstown.

== The Staples family ==
The estate was home to the Staples family from about 1620 until the death of the last incumbent, Hazel Radclyffe-Dolling (née Staples), in April 2006, the longest known occupation by a single family of a domestic dwelling in Ireland.

Thomas Staples had originally come from Yate Court, near Bristol in Southwestern England, in about 1610 as part of the plantation of Ulster. He settled in the town of Moneymore (then being constructed as part of the terms of the Plantation Grant to the Worshipful Company of Drapers who had been granted large swathes of the new County in 1611) in County Londonderry and his stone house is marked on a Thomas Raven map of 1622 beside the Market Cross.

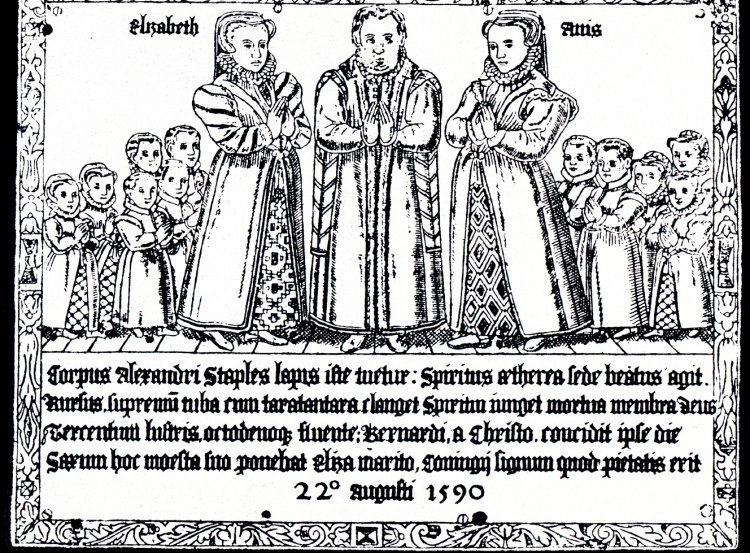
Rubbing of the Brass tomb plate of Alexander Staples of Yate Court (d. 1590). He is shown with his two wives and eleven children. His youngest son was Sir Thomas Staples, 1st Baronet Lissan & Faughanvale (d.1653)

In around 1622 Thomas Staples married Charity Jones, heiress of Sir Baptist Jones, Master of the Worshipful Company of Vintners. In 1628, he was created the first Baronet of Lissan and Faughanvale by King Charles I. Around the same date, he purchased several leases including the lands of the town of Cookstown and 180 acres (0.73 km^{2}) at Tatnagilta (now the Lissan estate). It is thought that a dwelling existed on the estate at this time along with an Iron Forge which was used to smelt the iron deposits found across the estate. Mainly as a result of the existence of the forge, the dwelling house survived the Rebellion of 1641 when the estate was seized by Niall Og O'Quinn who had marched with a troop of rebels from Moneymore. Prior to the rebellion Sir Staples had purchased the townland of Loy from O'Quinn. Charity, Lady Staples, and the couple's four children were imprisoned briefly in the Castle at Moneymore before being moved more permanently to the Castle at Castlecaulfield where they spent almost two years in captivity until Moneymore was relieved and the rebels suppressed. Throughout the Rebellion, the rebels used the estate and its workers to manufacture pikes, staves and other weapons as a result of which all the buildings on the estate survived despite the rebels' destruction of the town of Cookstown and the nearby plantation estate at Ballydrum (later Springhill). Testimonies taken from The Dowager Lady Staples and her son, the new Baronet, Sir Baptist Staples (which survive in Trinity College Dublin, describe the brutality of their treatment during these years. Lady Staples recounts witnessing Anglo-Irish families being murdered outside her prison window or those being tortured in chain-gangs begging to be killed to be done with their misery.

The present house substantially owes its existence to Sir Thomas' third son, the fourth Baronet, Sir Robert Staples. Having married another heiress in the person of Mary Vessey, he improved the estate, building mills and enlarging the iron forge as well as substantially constructing the present house (incorporating large parts of the pre-existent dwelling) in about 1690. He also created the 5-acre (20,000 m^{2}) walled garden which survives to this day. The main feature of his house was the huge oak staircase which still (following a reconstruction due to collapse in the 1880s) dominates the house today. Thomas Ashe writing his report to the Archbishop of Armagh, from whom the land was originally leased, said in 1703 "Robert Staples has built a very good stone house; the rooms are noble, lofty and large. There is a very handsome staircase which leads to chambers above with a large parlour and dining room. The house is well-shingled and stands near a small tenement with four pretty rooms. He has built a handsome stable, large barns and a turf house all well shingled." Sir Robert died in 1714.

== The eighteenth century ==
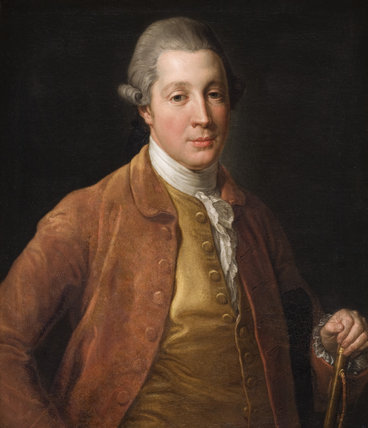
John Staples (1736–1820) by Pompeo Batoni

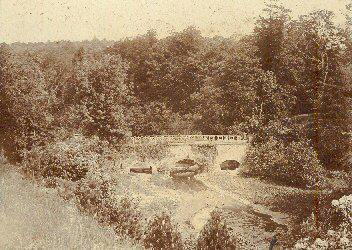
The White Bridge

As a result of a legal uncertainty contained in the Marriage Settlement executed by the fourth Baronet and his wife Mary Vesey at the request of Mary's father John Vesey the Archbishop of Tuam and dated 12 March 1682, ownership of the Estate became the subject of protracted legal proceedings following the death of the 4th Baronet in 1714 conducted between his four surviving children; Sir John the fifth Baronet, Sir Alexander the sixth Baronet, the Rev. Thomas Staples and their sister Mary Maurice (née Staples). These legal difficulties resulted in almost a century of court proceedings which were eventually conclusively settled in favour of Sir Alexander and Rev. Thomas in the wake of the House of Lords appeal in Sir Robert Staples v Margaretta Maurice (1774) Mews Dig. vi, 328; xii, 950, by which time all the original protagonists were dead. During the course of the proceedings, Sir Alexander and Rev. Thomas had effectively divided the Staples estates between them, with Sir Alexander tending to lands in Queen's County from his home at Dunmore House whilst Thomas operated the Estate at Lissan.

When this arrangement was confirmed in 1774, Lissan became the permanent seat of a junior branch of the family under the Rt. Hon. John Staples K.C., P.C., M.P., whilst the seventh and eighth Baronets remained at Dunmore. John Staples was a talented lawyer and one of the longest standing members of the Irish House of Commons before its dissolution in 1801. He went on two grand tours of Italy, furnishing Lissan with a fine collection of books, paintings and marbles and was painted twice by the famed Italian artist Pompeo Batoni.

He married, firstly, Harriet Conolly, daughter of William James Conolly of Castletown House. This marriage resulted in three children, a son, William Conolly Staples, and two daughters. Upon the death of Harriet Conolly in 1771, the two daughters, Louisa Anne and Henrietta Margaret were taken into the custody of Thomas Conolly and Lady Louisa Conolly of Castletown House. When Lady Louisa died in 1821, she bequeathed the Castletown estate to the eldest son of Louisa Anne Staples, Col. Edward Michael Packenham who thereupon adopted the name Conolly by Royal Licence on 27 August 1821. His descendants remained at Castletown until 1965. His second wife was Henrietta Molesworth, younger daughter of the 3rd Viscount Molesworth, one of the Duke of Marlborough's generals during the War of the Spanish Succession. He had saved the Duke from death by shouting to his equerry as the Duke mounted his horse just in time for the equerry to hoist the Duke up thus avoiding a cannonball which decapitated the equerry. Henrietta lost a leg in a fire in her mother's house during her youth. King George III had provided her dowry and also instructed the Court physician to fashion for her a wooden prosthetic leg. The children of the Rt. Hon. John Staples and his wife Henrietta married into some of the best connected families in Ireland including the Marquesses of Ormonde, Earls of Clancarty, Earls of Longford and Lords Ponsonby. The couple are also the great-great-grandparents of the writer C.S. Lewis.

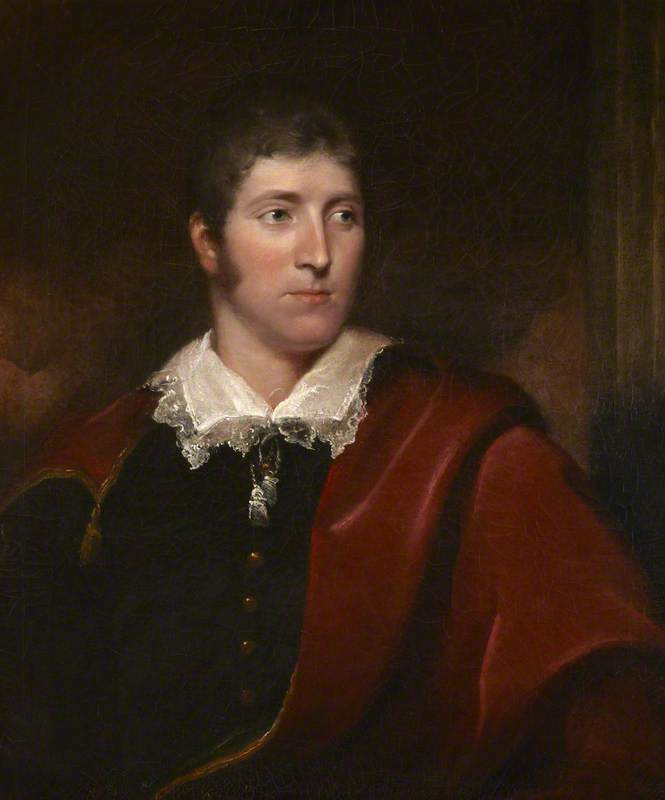
Sir Robert Staples, 8th Baronet (1772–1832)

John's father, Rev. Thomas Staples had entered into partnership with the Archbishop of Armagh, the Archbishop of Tuam, the Rev Hon Arthur Hill and Charles Caulfield to found the Tyrone Mining Company with a capital of £10,000. With this, they founded the coal mines in Coalisland and brought the Sardinian architect, Davis Ducart, to Ireland to design “dry hurries” which transported coal from the pits to the Canal for transport to Dublin. He also persuaded Ducart to design the White Bridge on the Lissan Estate along with an important water garden with fountains and cascades. These survive on the estate today but are in need of restoration. In the 1830s, the balustrade on the White Bridge was reconstructed according to the wishes of Catherine, Lady Staples, wife of the ninth Baronet Sir Thomas Staples Queen's Advocate in Ireland, to a design taken from a screen in the house.

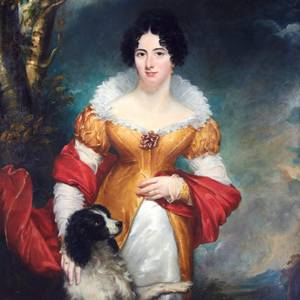
Catherine, Lady Staples (d.1872), wife of the 9th Baronet Sir Thomas, by Martin Cregan

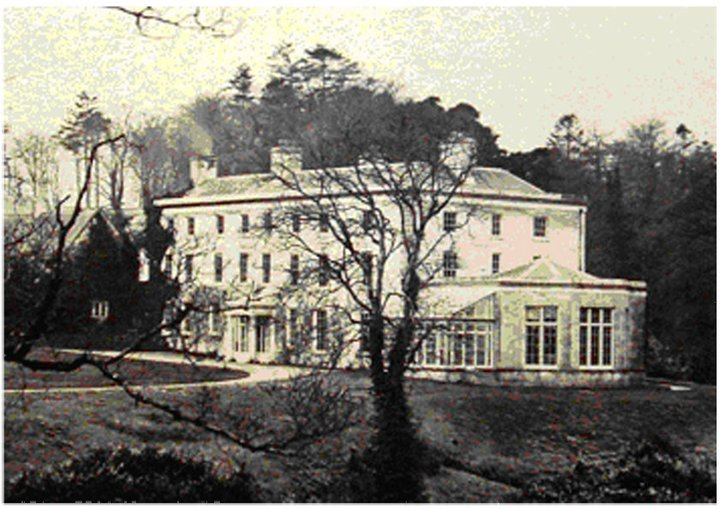
Lissan House c.1860

The eighth Baronet, Sir Robert, died without legitimate issue, so the Dunmore property was bequeathed to his eldest (illegitimate) son, while the Baronetcy was inherited by John Staples' eldest son Thomas who thus became the ninth Baronet and reunited the title with the Lissan Estate. Sir Thomas Staples Q.C. was a notable lawyer and was appointed Queen's Advocate in Ireland in 1845. He married Catherine Hawkins, another heiress. He purchased the largest town house on Merrion Square in Dublin (now the Irish Architectural Archive) and made several significant additions to Lissan House, most notably the large ballroom built to take advantage of views over the water gardens. No expense was spared on the construction of this room which was fitted with an early central heating system, was double glazed and which had sprung floorboards to aid dancing. The curious dovetail joints of the floor boarding are quite remarkable and it is clear that the timbers were set with neither nail nor screw. The room was decorated in a striking oriental scheme of scarlet and black and was decorated with vastly expensive hand-painted Chinese wallpaper possibly originally purchased by Sir Thomas' sister Grace, Marchioness of Ormonde for Kilkenny Castle. Small portions of this wallpaper survive today, touched up by the last owner.

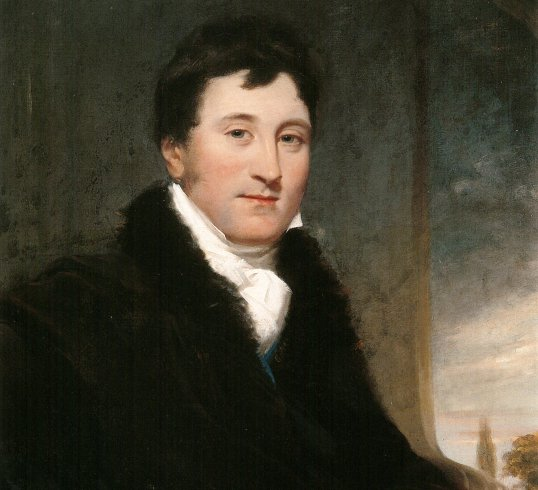
Sir Thomas Staples, 9th Baronet (1775–1865) by Martin Cregan

Sir Thomas' younger brother, the Rev. John Molesworth Staples, Rector of Moville in County Donegal and Lissan commissioned the Court architect to George IV, John Nash to design Lissan Rectory and Derryloran Parish Church in Cookstown. Nash had been introduced into his circle by his aunt, Elizabeth Stewart (née Molesworth), who had commissioned the architect to rebuild Killymoon Castle between 1801 and 1803.

== Decline of the estate ==
Sir Thomas died childless in 1865 as a result of which the title and estate were inherited by Rev. John Molesworth Staples' eldest son Nathaniel, the 10th Baronet. However, Sir Thomas left the contents of the house as well as the entirety of the family's fortune to his wife Catherine. On her death, while Lissan House and its Estate had already passed to Sir Nathaniel, the remainder of their property was bequeathed to two beneficiaries.

Sir Nathaniel Staples, 10th Baronet (1817–1899) by his son Robert Ponsonby Staples

The couple's godchild Mary Banks, (daughter of Sir John Banks), inherited the Staples' Dublin property including the fine portrait of Catherine, Lady Staples by Martin Cregan now restored to Lissan. Harriet Gage (née Lenox-Conyngham, a relative from Springhill House ) inherited the entire contents of Lissan House. Sir Nathaniel suddenly found himself the owner of a large, unfurnished house with little funds. Thus the estate began a process of very swift financial decline. When Sir Nathaniel eventually settled at Lissan during the 1880s, despite his straightened financial circumstances, he continued to live life to the full. He added a porte cochère to the front of the house and purchased the clock tower from the Market House in Magherafelt which he added to the West end of the house.

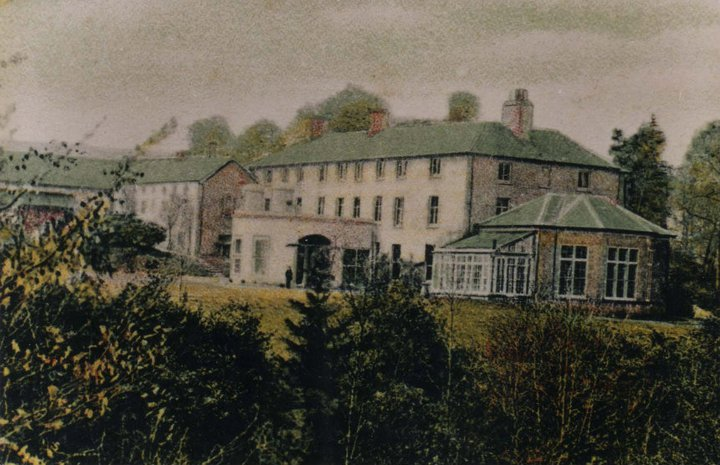
Lissan House c.1890 showing the Porte Cochère added by Sir Nathaniel Staples

This clock was made by Joshua Adams in 1820 and the great bell can be heard in Churchtown to this day. It is mentioned in the song Slieve Gallion's Braes. At the age of 55 Sir Nathaniel evicted Elizabeth, Lady Staples from the house and lived out his remaining years in the scandalous company of a young clairvoyant, Mary Potter, who was originally from Cookstown.

By the time of his death in 1899, the family were all but financially ruined. To compound their difficulties, the 11th Baronet, Sir John Staples was declared insane and spent the entire duration of his baronetcy in asylums in Belgium (from which he was rescued after the outbreak of the Great War) and Omagh until his death in 1933.

As a result of this, the estate was first occupied by the second eldest son of the family, James Head Staples who had originally settled in Braemar in Scotland. He and his wife built a creamery, took in boarders and Mrs Staples taught cookery and lace-making so that local girls would have some training to enable them to find work in Cookstown. James also fitted a second-hand water turbine on the Lissan Water in 1902 which supplied the house with its sole source of electricity until 2004 and which is still in working order today. The estate remained, however, in terminal decline.

== Sir Robert Ponsonby Staples, 12th Baronet ==
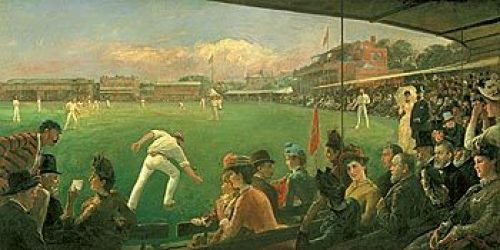
An Imaginary Cricket Match, Sir Robert Ponsonby Staples

By 1911, James Head Staples' health had declined to such an extent that he was no longer able to run the Estate. His eccentric younger brother, Robert Ponsonby Staples thus settled at Lissan in November 1912. Robert Ponsonby Staples was an exceptionally talented artist. He had gone to Leuven to study architecture at the age of twelve before moving to Dresden to study fine art. When he returned to London during the 1880s he quickly became one of the most renowned portrait artists of his day. He exhibited his first picture at the Royal Academy at 21 and was a founder member, along with Sir Coutts Lindsay, of the Grosvenor Gallery, which launched the careers of Whistler and Burne-Jones. His most famous paintings can be found in galleries across the world today. His most noted work, An Imaginary Cricket Match, hangs at Lord's Cricket Ground, while other large scale works can be found at the House of Lords (The Passing of the Home Rule Bill) and the Archiepiscopal Palace at Westminster (Cardinal Manning's Last Reception). Robert Ponsonby was also an infamous socialite and member of the Café Royal set. He was a friend and favourite of King Edward VII. His most famous attribute was his refusal to wear shoes. He believed that the earth exuded natural electricity which was beneficial to the health and thus shunned the wearing of shoes, listing his principal occupation as "barefoot walking" in the 1926 Who's Who.

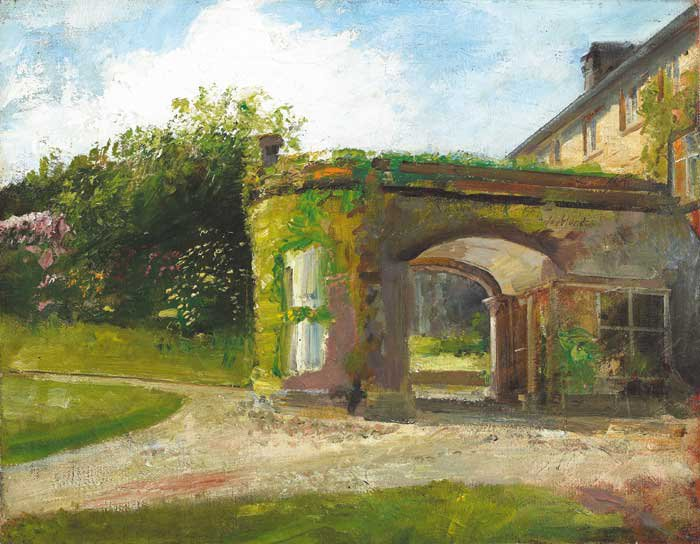
Lissan House from the East by Sir Robert Ponsonby Staples c. 1936

Today his paintings are hugely valuable but, while living at the centre of the social scene in fin de siecle London, his work did not make him a wealthy man. After settling at Lissan, his finances evaporated and he was known to often ask the postman for a loan or to pawn his own paintings to raise funds. A great sale was held during his tenure which lasted two full days and which saw the remaining pictures and fine furnishings sold off, many to the Lenox-Conyngham family at Springhill where they remain. He inherited the baronetcy aged 80 in 1933 and died 10 years later.

== The latter twentieth century ==
By 1943, the estate, stripped of its furnishings and its lands largely sold off, was virtually bankrupt. Sir Robert Ponsonby Staples' eldest son, Sir Robert George Alexander Staples, 13th Baronet, discovered that he could no longer afford to live at Lissan. He thus hired a distant relative, Harry Radclyffe-Dolling, as estate manager and settled in England where he could find work. Harry Dolling had the house divided into apartments, and from 1943 until the late 1960s the house was home to over a hundred people living in self-contained flats and tenements carved out of the once elegant public rooms and bedrooms. Many of the remaining contents (including the remnants of John Staples' Library) were sent to Springhill House for safekeeping and were not returned.

Sir Robert George Alexander feared that he would be the last Staples owner of Lissan. He had only two daughters as issue. The younger, Elizabeth, had settled with her own family in England while the elder, Hazel, (following a spell in the WRNS) had settled into a life on the seas with the Cunard Line as purser on the Queen Mary and RMS Caronia (1947). Neither had any interest in the now crumbling, rundown, and bankrupt estate. However, on the death of the 13th Baronet in 1970, the elder daughter Hazel visited Lissan with her mother and met the agent Harry Dolling. Within the year the pair were married and both settled at Lissan, returning the house to a single dwelling for the occupation of themselves and Vera, Lady Staples.

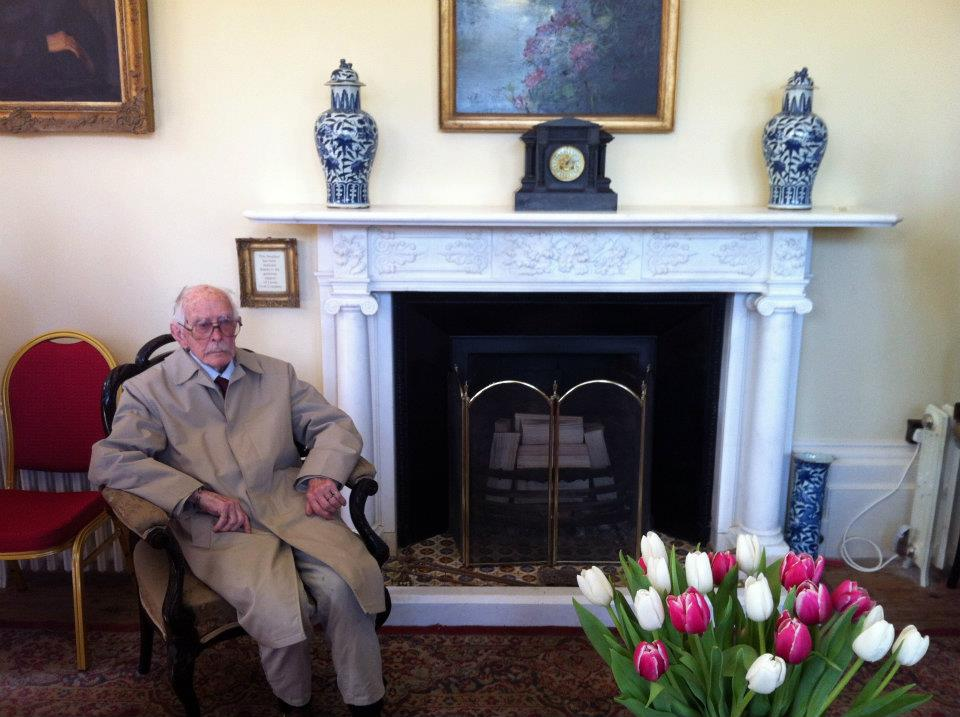
Sir Richard Molesworth Ponsonby Staples, 17th and last Baronet (1914–2013), photographed at the official opening of Lissan House, April 2010

While Hazel inherited the house and estate from her father, the Baronetcy passed to a distant cousin and descendant of Major General Thomas Staples (younger brother of the 10th Baronet), Sir Jack Staples, who became the 14th Baronet aged 64. Having himself only two daughters as issue, the Baronetcy passed from him to another cousin, Sir Thomas Staples, 15th Baronet (who had emigrated to Canada, married but with no issue) and from him to his younger brother Sir Gerald James Arland Staples who became 16th Baronet at the age of 88 and died only two years later in Hampshire, England, leaving wife Henrietta, Lady Staples and two daughters. The 17th Baronet, Sir Richard Molesworth Ponsonby Staples of Lismore, County Waterford, was Sir Gerald's youngest brother and inherited the Baronetcy in 1999 aged 85.

All three of the last Lissan Baronets inherited the title well into their eighties and none had any male heirs. As a result, a search was instigated by Debrett's in 1990 seeking the next Staples Baronet and a 10-year Genetic Research Programme started in 2002 which it was hoped would locate the 18th Baronet. Three candidates; Garth Staples and Gerald Staples of Nova Scotia, Canada, and David Staples of Massachusetts, USA, have been identified as within a sufficient genetic distance, and claim descent from Matthew Staples who emigrated to Canada in the late eighteenth century. Matthew Staples himself claimed descent from Rev. Alexander Staples, the younger brother of the Rt. Hon. John Staples. It is believed that Matthew Staples was in the company of Governor Cornwallis as a military blacksmith at Halifax in 1749 although the link with the Lissan family tree remains elusive and no one candidate has yet proved their claim. As a result, when Sir Richard Molesworth Staples died on 8 November 2013, the Baronetcy was declared dormant.

== Preservation ==
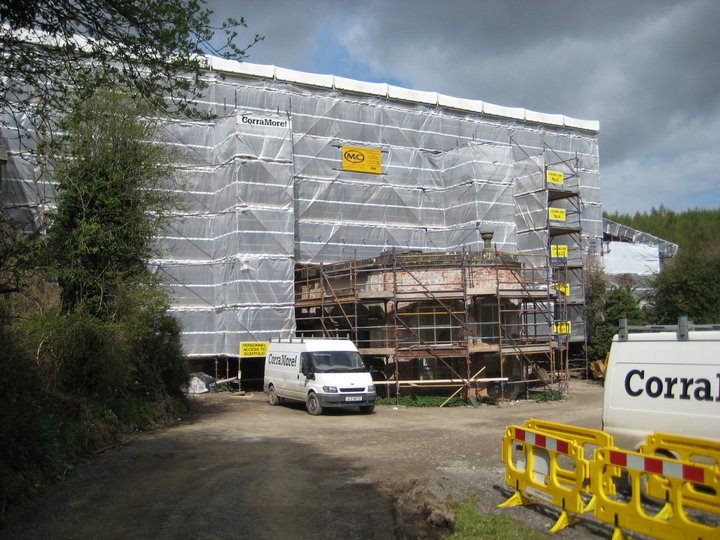
Phase I of the restoration begins, 2010

Following inheriting the house, Hazel lived with her husband and mother until the former's death in 1986 and the latter's death in 1990. From 1990 she lived at Lissan alone. By 1997, it had become clear to Hazel that no member of the family would be able financially or practically to inherit the estate. After a life devoted to the preservation of what was now an absolutely unique property of great antiquity and historic value, Hazel decided to establish a charitable trust which could begin to form a plan for a viable future for the estate. The farmyard and walled gardens were immediately put in the care of the Trust and a scheme was sought for the future of the estate.

In 2003, the property featured in the TV series Restoration which promised to the winner of a phone-in competition a fund in excess of £1,000,000 for the restoration of the building. Lissan and Hazel, its chatelaine, featured prominently and caught the imagination of the British public. As a result, Lissan beat off 28 other properties to make it to the grand final and lost out to the Victoria Baths in Manchester by only 140 votes. Sadly however while bringing the estate to huge public attention, the programme resulted in no funding for the project whatsoever.

The charitable trust was thus re-formed in 2004 as the Lissan House Trust. Hazel Radclyffe-Dolling died in April 2006 and under the terms of her will, the entire estate was bequeathed to the Charitable Trust on condition that a viable scheme of restoration was secured within three years of her death.

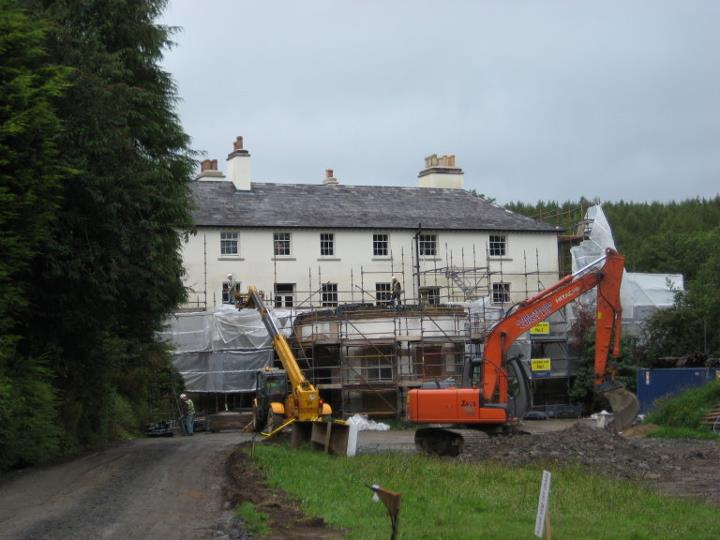
Phase I of the restoration complete, scaffolding is removed

Today, Lissan represents a unique and fascinating part of Ulster's history which has caught the public imagination. In August 2007, the Lissan House Trust opened the house to the public for the first time and almost 5,000 visitors made their way to the estate in the eight days of opening, making Lissan potentially one of the most popular tourist attractions in Ulster.

In 2010, Phase I of the Restoration of the Estate started and major structural restoration work was carried out on the main House including making the building structurally safe; re-roofing; removal of the 1940s cement render and its replacement with lime-washed lime mortar and re-fenestration with Georgian glazing. In addition, the interior of the house was re-presented, forest trails laid, an adventure playground constructed and an interpretative exhibition installed in the house.

Funding for Phase II (the restoration of the interior decorative schemes, re-building the Conservatory and the complete restoration of the farmyard and outbuildings) is currently being sought.

The house opened to the public for the first time as a tourist attraction and events location in Spring 2012.
