= Springhill House =

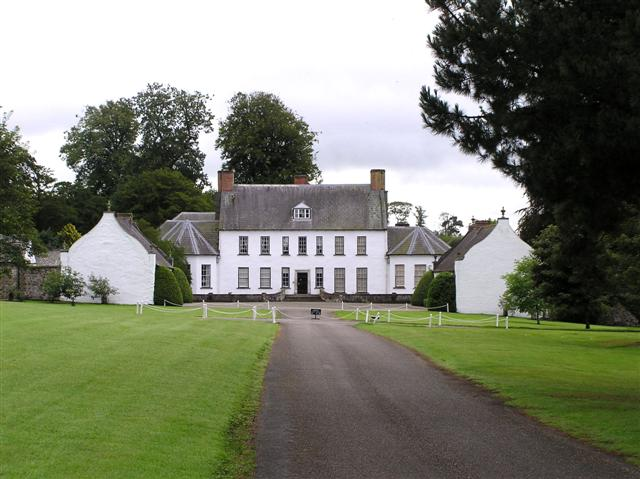

- Location within Northern Ireland

General information
- Type: House
- Location: Moneymore, County Londonderry, Northern Ireland
- Coordinates: 54.686°N 6.656°W
- Construction started: c.1680–1689 with notable extensions c.1765 and c.1820
- Governing body: National Trust

Springhill is a 17th-century plantation house in the townland of Ballindrum near Moneymore, County Londonderry in Northern Ireland. It has been the property of the National Trust since 1957 and, in addition to the house, gardens and park, there is a costume collection. It is open from March to June, and September on weekends, and is open to the public seven days a week during July and August.

== Features ==
This 17th-century unfortified house was built about 1680-1695 and was originally surrounded by a defensive bawn. Around 1765 two single-storey wings were added and the entrance front was modified to its present arrangement of seven windows across its width.

== History ==
=== The Conyngham family ===
The Conyngham family had come from Ayrshire in Scotland in about 1609, possibly from Glengarnock and the first of the family in Ulster was said to have been one of the family of the Earls of Glencairn. Alexander Conyngham, Dean of Raphoe, ancestor of the later Marquesses Conyngham, was probably a near relative – his son Sir Albert Cunningham's portrait is at Springhill and not Slane Castle. They were granted lands under James I's Plantation of Ulster in County Armagh and County Londonderry. The early history of the family is something of a mystery. Mina Lenox-Conynham asserted that a document previously held in the Public Records Office in Dublin asserted that the lands at Ballindrum (later Springhill) were in Conyngham hands as early as 1609, but she believed this record to have been destroyed during the Battle of Dublin and the shelling of the Four Courts It is believed that some form of farm dwelling was constructed on the estate in the second quarter of the seventeenth century (probably on the site of the present carpark) but this was destroyed during the Irish Rebellion of 1641.

=== William Conyngham I ===
William Conyngham I (referred to in family documents as "the elder") was a colonel in the Irish rebellion of 1641 and one of Cromwell's Commissioners for County Armagh and held land at Drumcrow in the county and property in the town of Armagh itself. He was granted new title deeds by Cromwell in 1652, 'the old ones having been destroyed in the recent wars'. He died in 1666, when High Sheriff of County Londonderry. In 1676 his widow lived in a house on the north side of Armagh with a garden and a little parke called Garreturne.

=== William Conyngham II ===
Marriage articles between William Conyngham II (known to the family as "Good Will") and Ann Upton of Castle Upton near Templepatrick executed 168, stated that he was required "to build a convenient house of lime and stone, two stories high ... with necessary office houses" for his wife-to-be. It is widely believed that the present house owes its origin to this document though dendrochronological examination of the roof timbers on the central part of the house date the beams to after 1690. At this time, many of the surviving outbuildings along with the rare Dutch styled gardens were created.

=== George Butle Conyngham ===
From William Conyngham II, the estate passed to George Butle in 1721. George was the son of William Conyngham II's sister Anne, who had married David Butle. George thereupon adopted the name Butle-Conyngham. Under the terms of the Plantation Grant, he reconstructed the village of Coagh in about 1755, naming the main square Hanover Square in deference to George II.

=== Col. William Conyngham ===
From George Butle Conyngham, the estate passed to his eldest son, Colonel William Conyngham of the 7th Dragoon Guards (known as the "Black Horse" regiment) in 1765. Col William added the two wings to either side of the house as a nursery and ballroom respectively.

=== George Lenox-Conyngham ===
Col. William Conyngham died without issue in 1784. The estate passed to his brother David Conyngham who also died childless four years later. As a result, the estate then passed to the son of their sister Ann who had married Clotworthy Lenox of Derry, grandson of James Lenox, Alderman of Derry (Mayor of Derry 1693 and 1697), remembered as one of the leaders of the Siege of Derry and the city's Member of Parliament 1703–1713. Col. George Lenox, upon inheriting the estate, adopted the name Lenox-Conyngham and his descendants lived in the house until 1961. George served under Castlereagh in the Irish Volunteers but, after being betrayed by Castlereagh, resigned his commission in disgrace in 1816. As a result of this, combined with his depressive nature, he committed suicide later that year. His 2nd wife Olivia (4th daughter of William Irvine of Castle Irvine, County Fermanagh) is said to haunt the house to this day and is reputed to be the best documented ghost in Ireland. George Lenox-Conyngham married as his first wife Jane Hamilton of Castlefin, by whom he had a son and heir William Lenox-Conyngham. Jane's mother was Jean Hamilton, daughter of John Hamilton of Brown Hall County Donegal; Jean married John Hamilton of Castlefin County Donegal, and after his death married George Lenox-Conyngham's uncle William Conyngham.

=== William Lenox-Conyngham, and the Lissan House connection ===
From George, the house passed to his eldest son William Lenox-Conyngham in 1816. He had been a talented lawyer in Glasgow but left his legal career to run the estate. In 1818 he married Charlotte Staples, daughter of John Staples of Lissan House near Cookstown. John Staples was a respected lawyer and member of the Irish House of Commons. Staples first wife was Harriet Conolly of Castletown House in County Kildare. The descendants of their eldest daughter Louisa Anne inherited Castletown House after the death of Lady Louisa Conolly in 1821. His second wife was Henrietta Molesworth, daughter of Field Marshal Richard Molesworth, 3rd Viscount Molesworth. Their son Thomas Staples became the 9th Lissan Baronet.

During William Lenox-Conyngham's tenure, the estate was drained and improved and a large well-appointed dining room was added to the rear of the house, complete with a 17th-century Italian chimneypiece salvaged from Frederick Hervey, 4th Earl of Bristol's Ballyscullion House near Bellaghy which was demolished in about 1825.

=== Sir William Fitzwilliam Lenox-Conyngham ===
When William Lenox-Conyngham died in 1858, the estate passed to his eldest son Lieutenant Colonel Sir William Lenox-Conyngham who had married Laura Arbuthnot, daughter of George Arbuthnot of Elderslie (Founder of the Indian bank, Arbuthnot & Co) in 1856. Her father's elder brother was Sir William Arbuthnot, 1st Baronet, Lord Provost of Edinburgh. Sir William Lenox-Conyngham was highly involved in military matters and was knighted (Knight Commander of the KCB) by Queen Victoria in 1881. During his tenure, the estate was largely sold off under the Purchase of Land (Ireland) Act 1885 and the Land Purchase (Ireland) Act 1903 and was reduced to around three hundred acres. Finances became a grave concern for the family. Sir William was the last Agent of The Drapers' Company, overseeing their remaining estate in Northern Ireland, which had been extensive and included Draperstown and Moneymore.

=== Decline of the Estate ===
By the time of Sir William's death in 1906, there was little left of the estate and as a result of some unwise investments, his son Lt. Col. William Arbuthnot Lenox-Conyngham found financial matters very trying. In 1899 he married Mina Lowry of Rockdale near Cookstown in County Tyrone. She was the last member of the family to live on the estate and she continued to do so even after the death of her son and the National Trust taking over in 1957, until her own death in 1961. Col. William Arbuthnot fought in both the Boer War and World War I and his younger brother Lt. Col. John Staples Molesworth Lenox-Conyngham was killed in action at Guillemont during the Battle of the Somme, on 3 September 1916, personally leading the 6th Battalion Connaught Rangers over the top and into the attack armed only with an ancient revolver. He is buried at Carnoy in France. The two wooden crosses that marked his grave were returned to Ireland and now lie inside St Patrick's Cathedral, Armagh, next to his memorial.

=== National Trust ===
William Arbuthnot Lenox-Conyngham died in 1938 and the estate passed to his elder son Capt. William Lowry Lenox-Conyngham who led the local Home Guard during the Second World War as a result of being invalided out of the National Defence Corps in 1940. Realising that the finances of the family were now in terminal decline and recognising that neither he nor his brother had any children to carry on the direct line, William Lowry entered into negotiations with the National Trust in 1956 with a view to handing over the house. This had followed a chance meeting with Nancy, Countess of Enniskillen who had presented Florence Court in County Fermanagh to the Trust the previous year. In the event, he signed his will bequeathing the house and estate to the National Trust only three days before his death in 1957.

William's uncle George Hugh Lenox-Conyngham married Barbara Josephine née Turton whose mother Lady Cecilia was the daughter of Joseph Leeson, 4th Earl of Milltown of Russborough County Wicklow. They had two sons Denis Hugh and Alwyn Douglas and two daughters Cecilia Laura and Eileen Mary, born in Edinburgh. Their father had, like previous members of the family, been educated in Edinburgh, in George's case at Fettes College where he was the first former pupil to return as a school master. After being Housemaster of Kimmerghame House, he became a priest. His first living was at Denver, Norfolk, then he was appointed Rector of Lavenham, a living that was held by his old Cambridge College Gonville & Caius. Eileen, Denis, their mother Barbara and aunt Alice Lenox-Conyngham travelled on the Titanic.

Following the death of William Lowry in 1957, the head of the family became Captain Alwyn Douglas Lenox-Conyngham RN, his elder brother Denis having died in China in 1928, whilst serving with his regiment The Cameronians. His eldest son Charles Denis Lenox-Conyngham, former managing director of Blue Funnel Line and chairman of Sealink is the current head of the family.

=== Restoration ===
Upon adopting the property, the National Trust undertook a large-scale programme of restoration and re-construction adopting the orthodoxy of 1950s conservation practice which saw the Victorian smoking room demolished, large portions of the house stripped back to stone and all the rooms re-arranged to reflect their appearance when first constructed.

== Present day ==
A 1920 catalogue of the library prior to the National Trust acquiring the property was compiled by Mina Lenox-Conyngham who played a key role in both the dispersal and the preservation of Springhill’s book collection. The Library contains one of the most important collections of 17th and 18th century books in Ireland and is composed of around 3000 volumes, the oldest of which is a small Latin psalter of 1541.

In the old laundry can be found the largest costume collection in Northern Ireland (established by Viscount Clanwilliam in 1960) and a selection from the collection is displayed annually in the costume museum.

The bedroom contains an intriguing medicine chest, once owned by the 3rd Viscount Molesworth.

Springhill was used for the location of the three-part adaptation of Eugene McCabe's modern Irish classic, Death and Nightingales, first broadcast in November 2018, featuring as the home of landowner Billy Winters.

== Wellbrook Beetling Mill ==
The National Trust owned Beetling Mill is a sister property of Springhill.

== Gallery ==
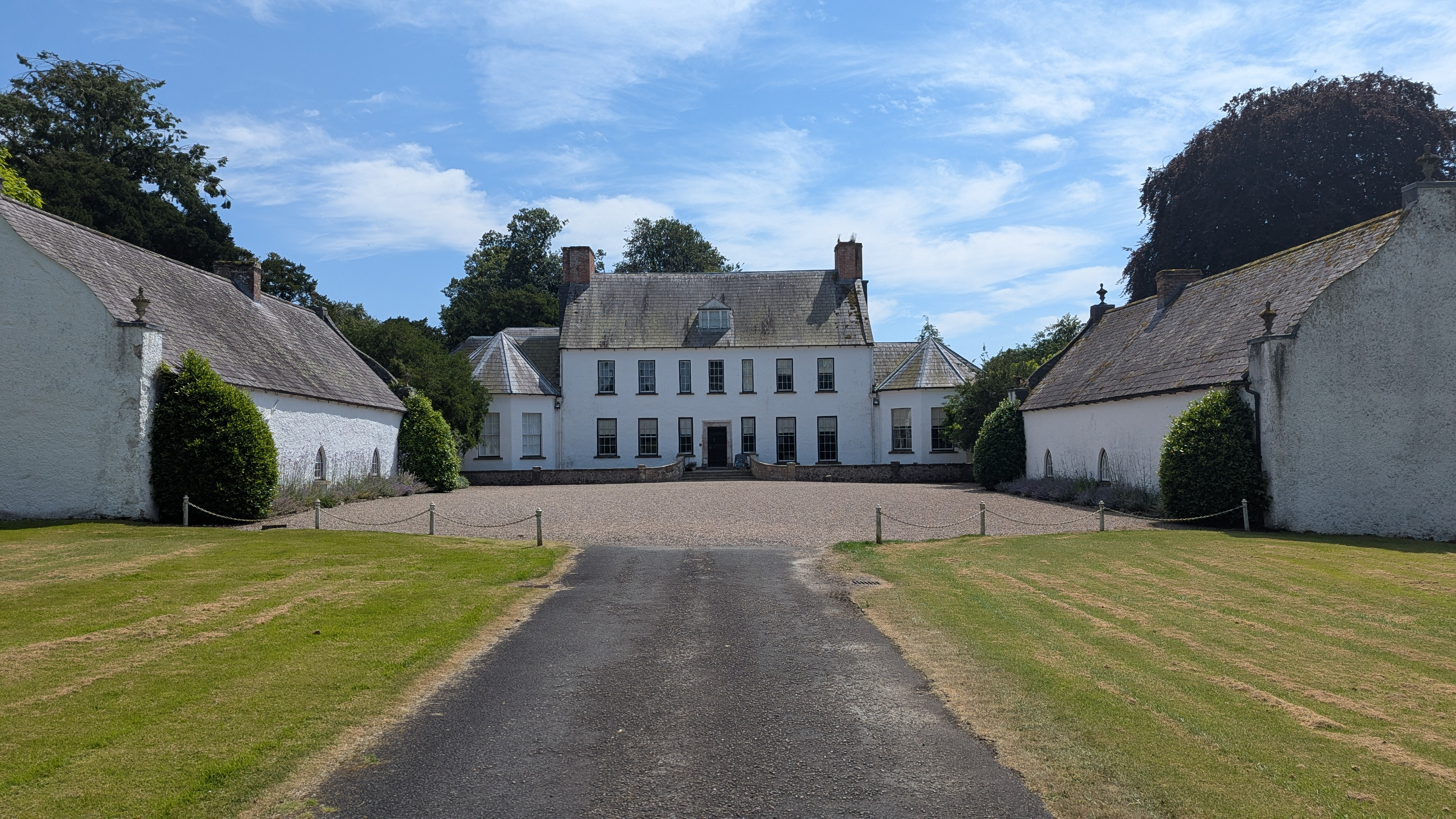

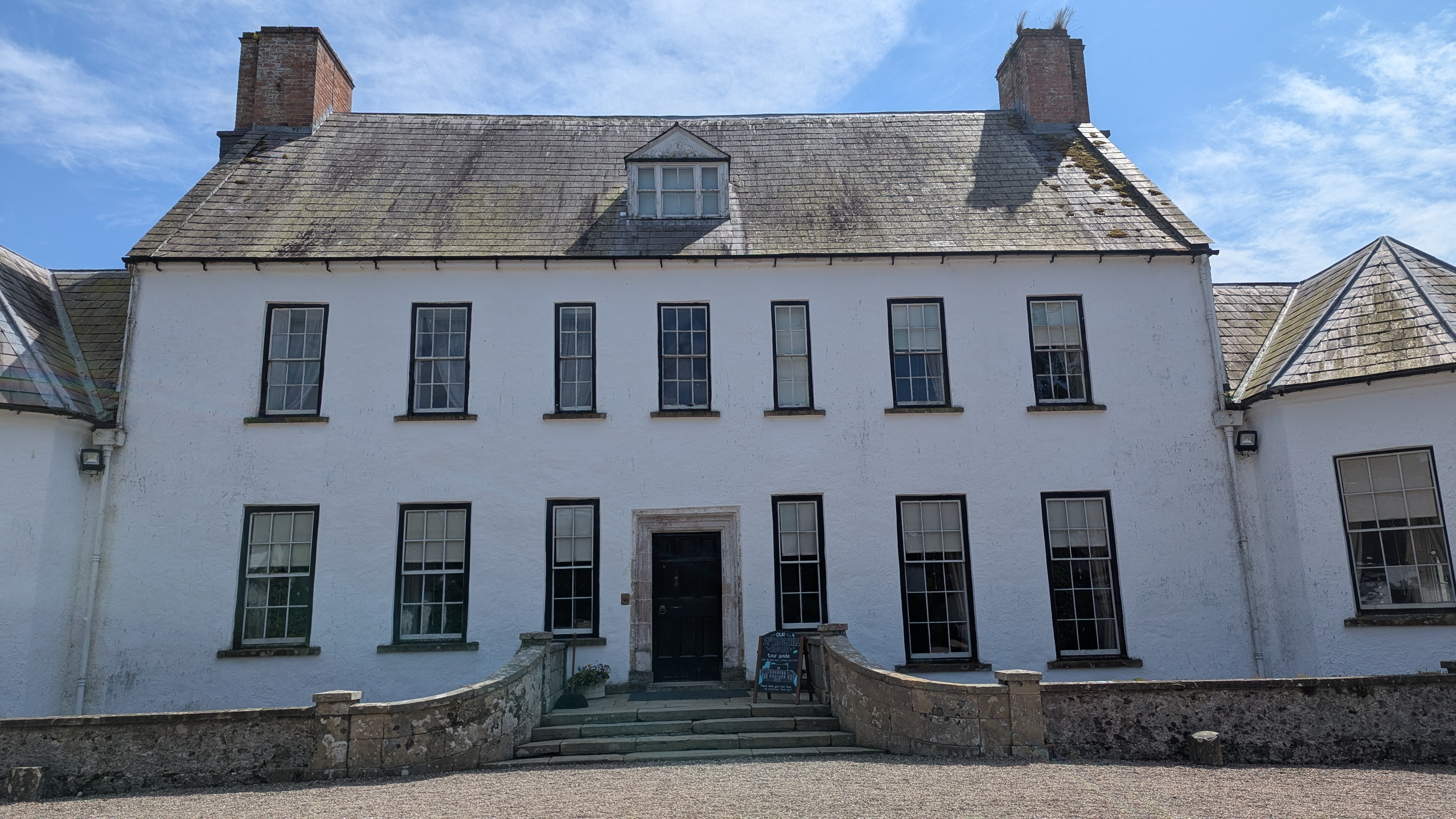

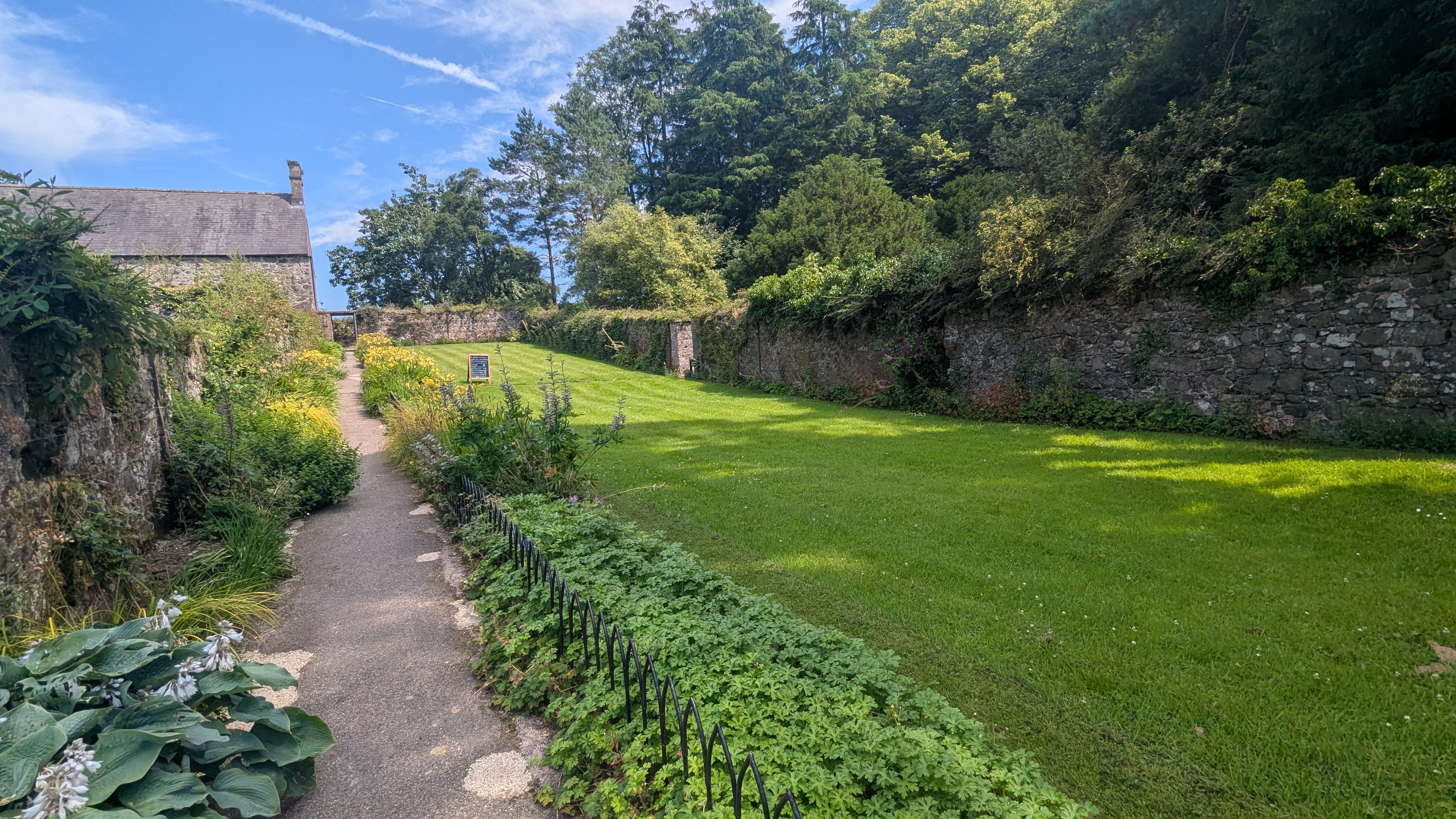

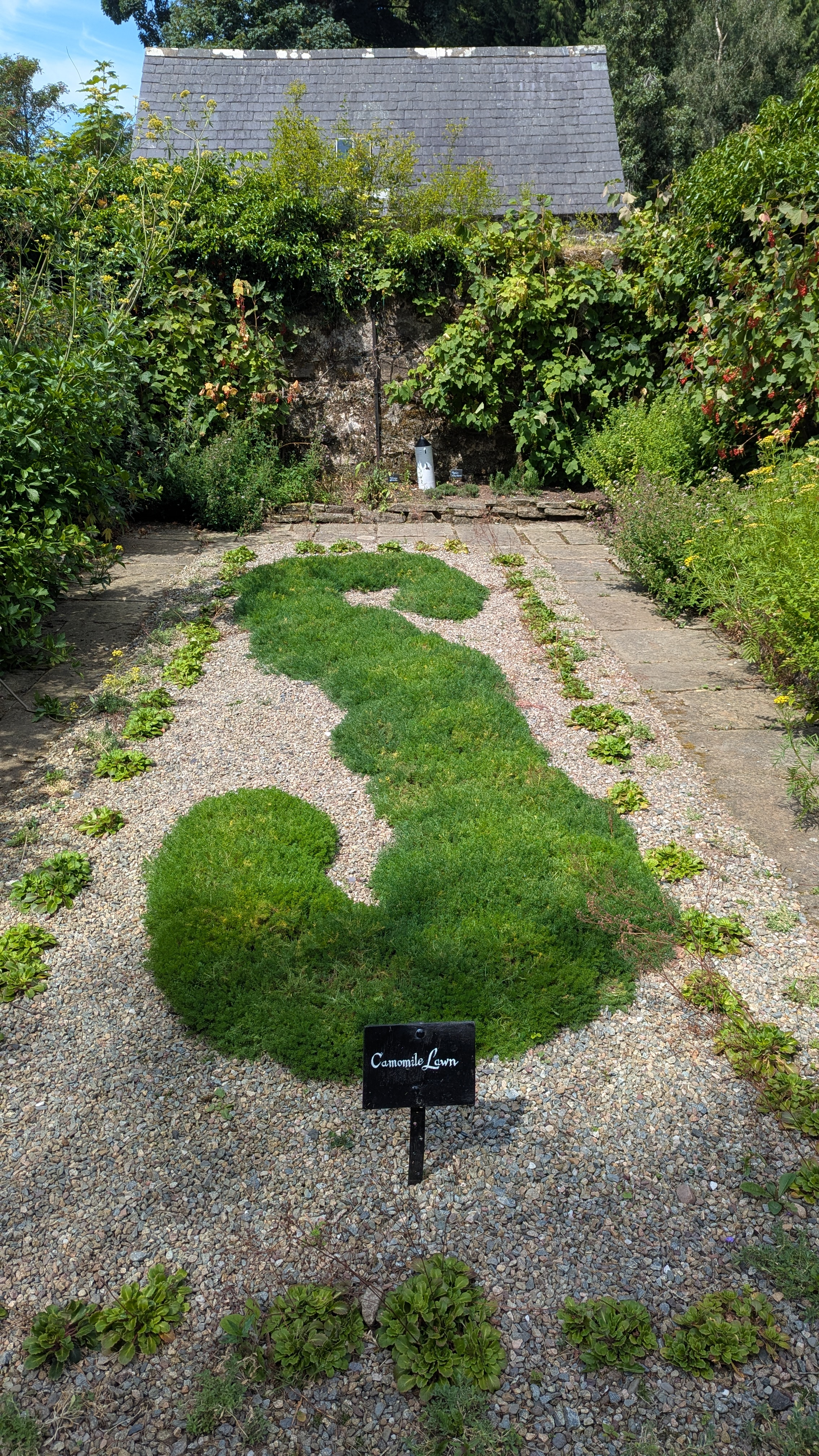

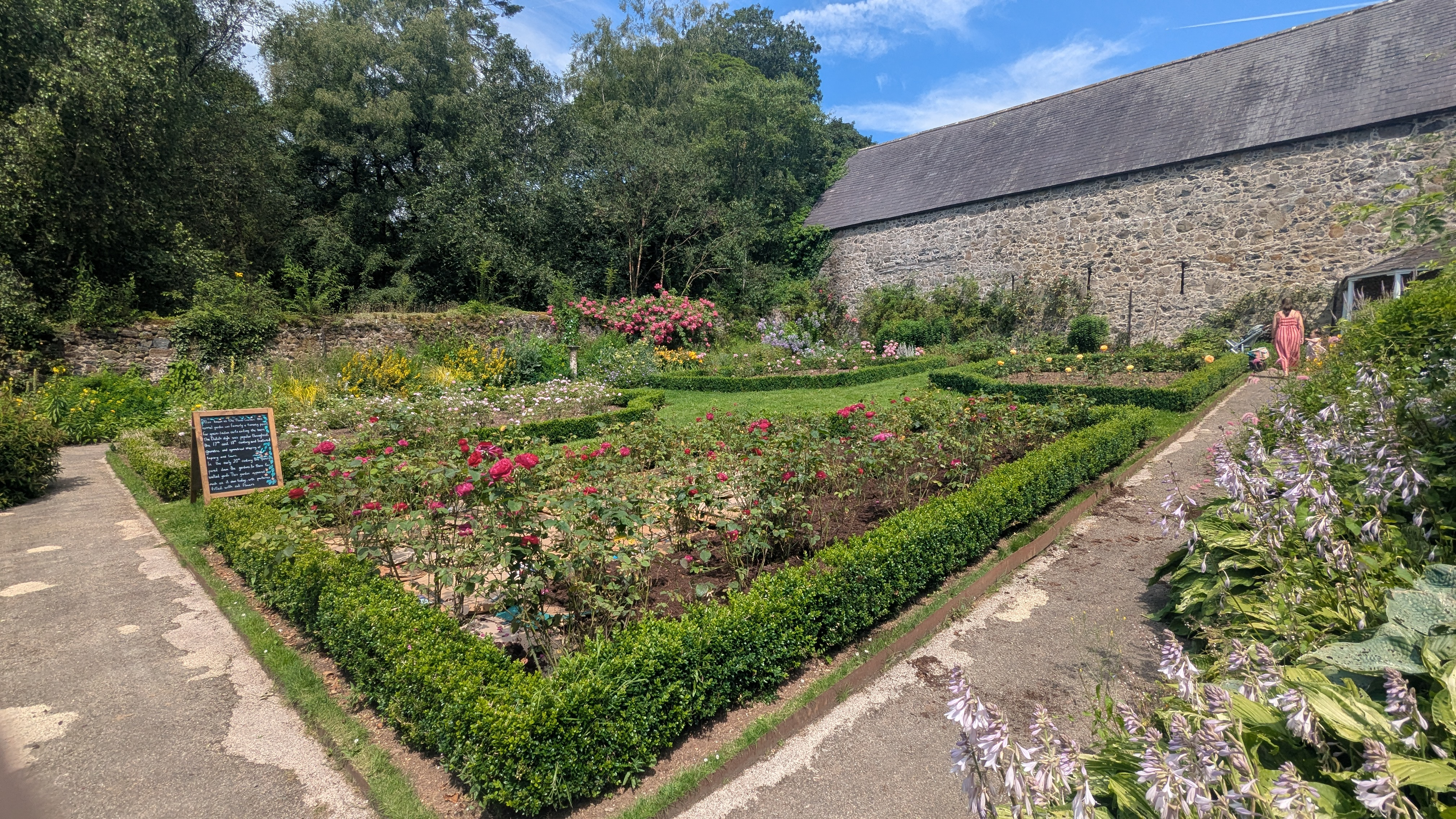

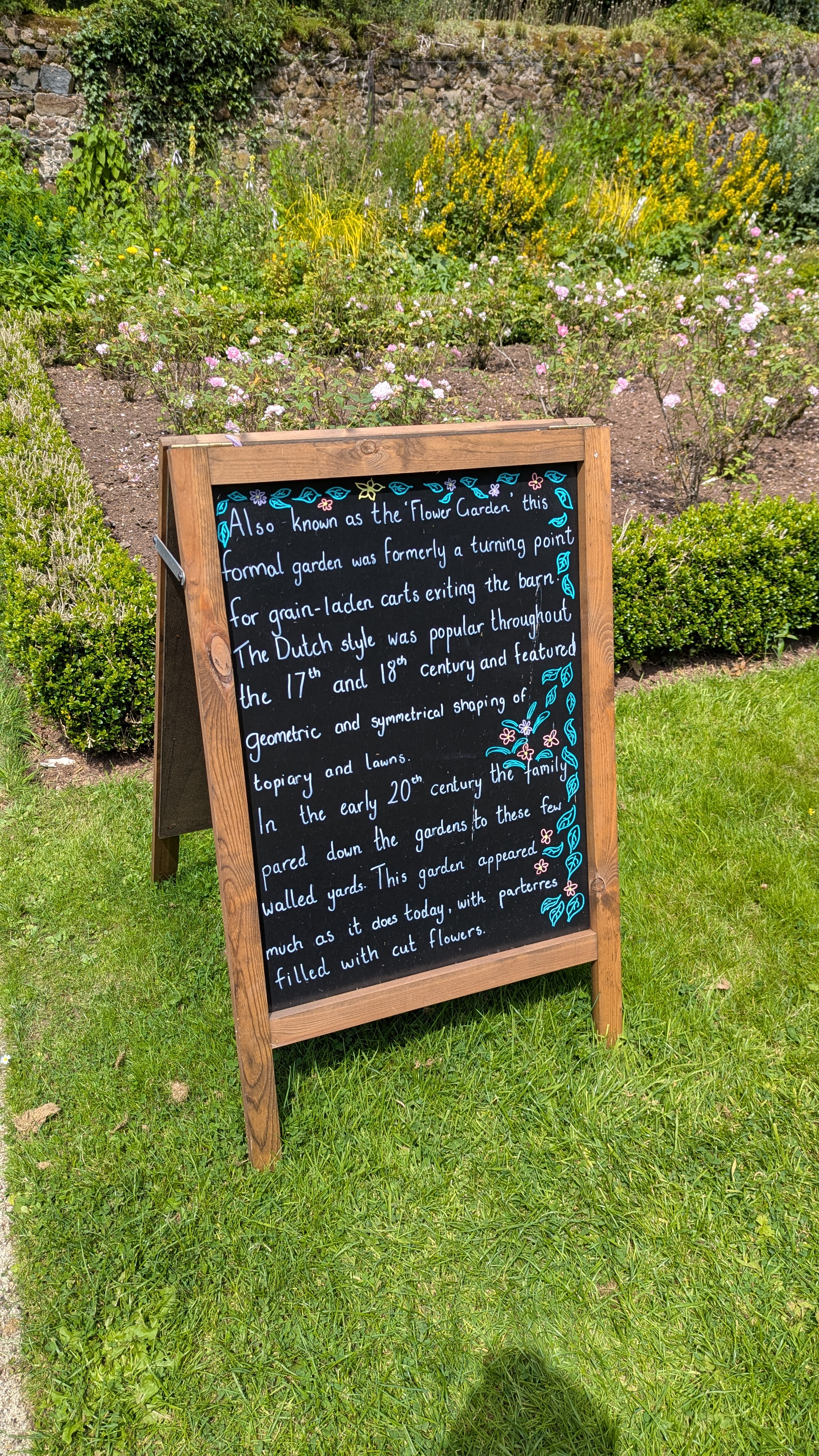

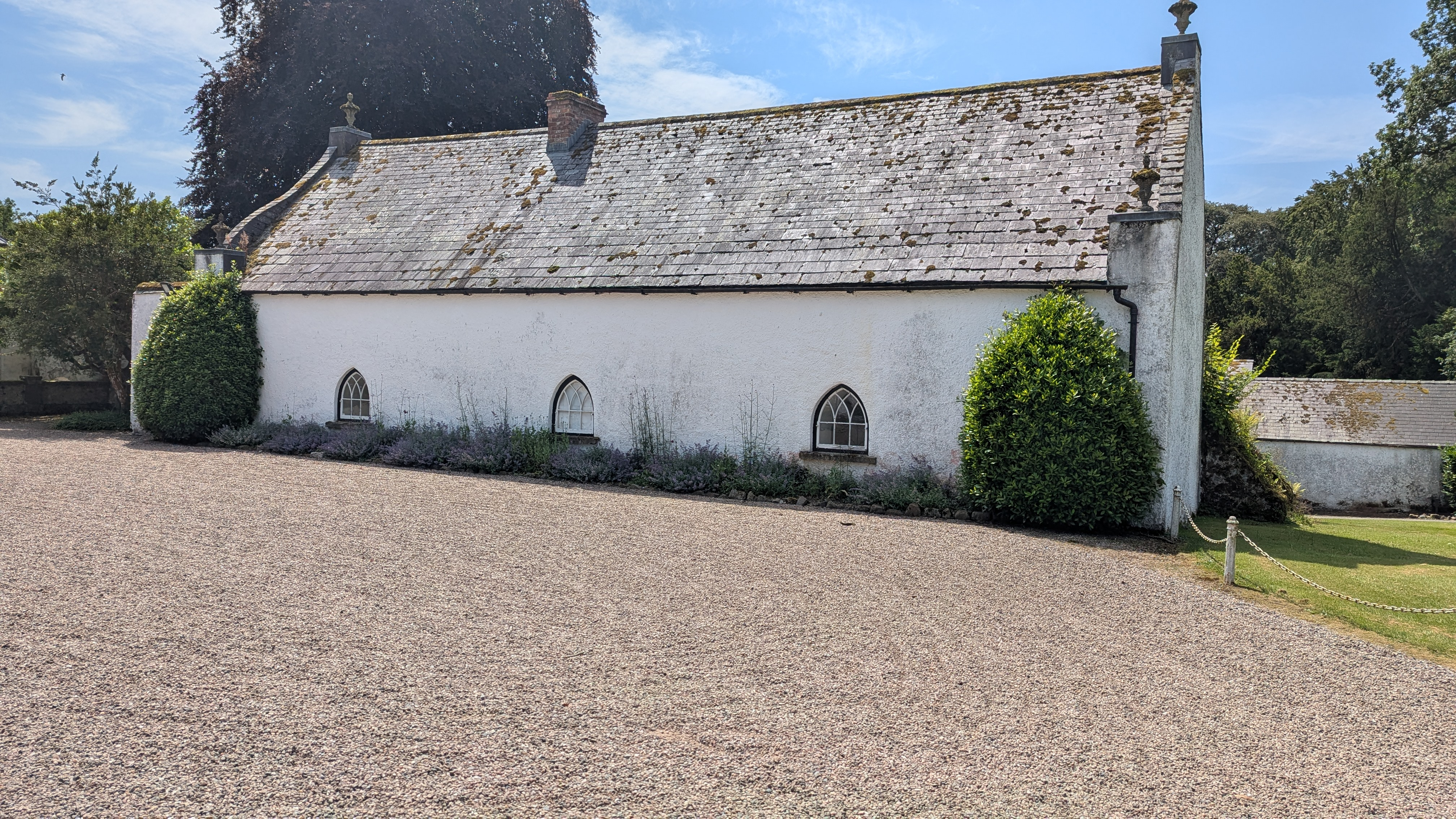

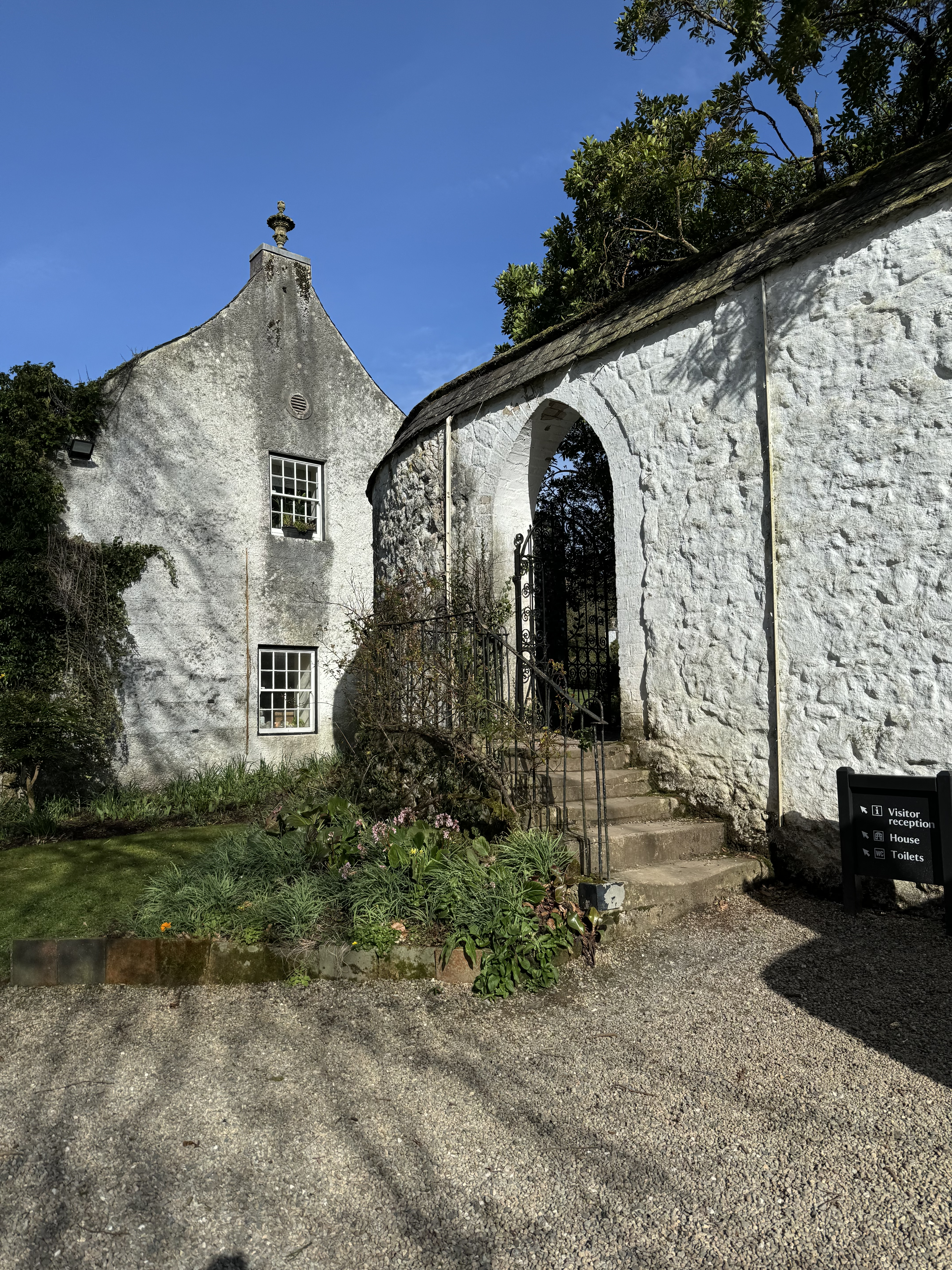

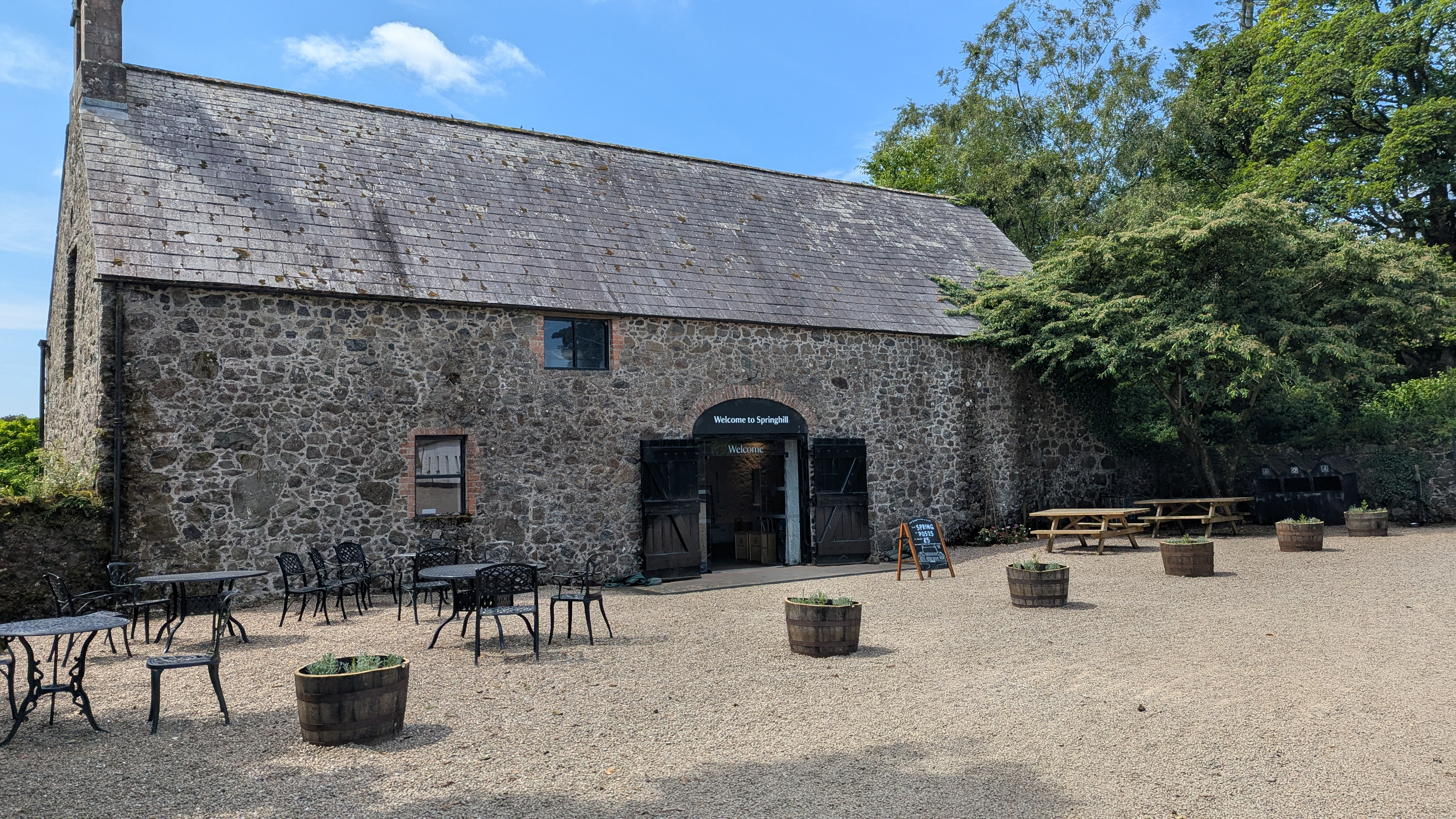

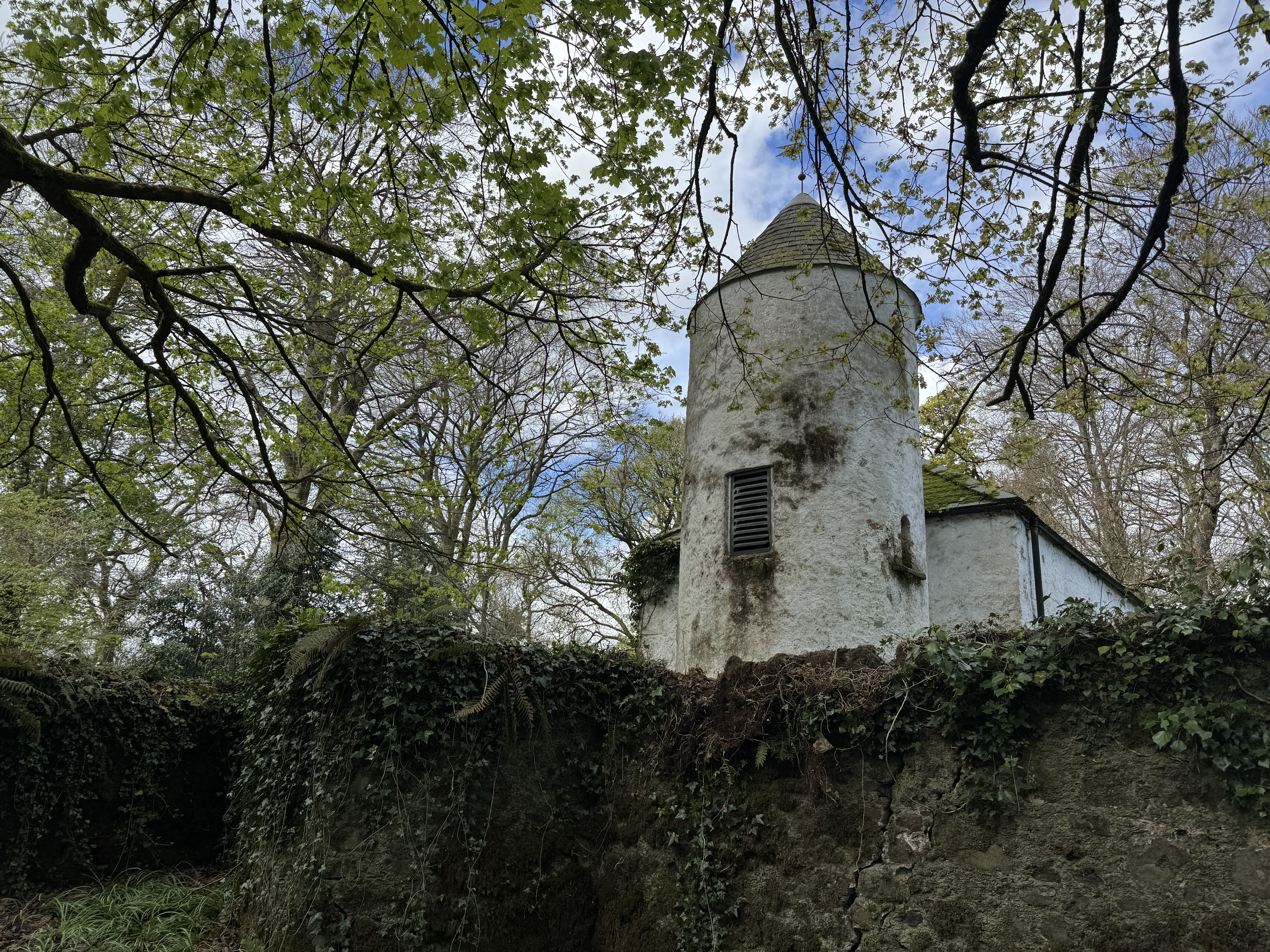

== Book ==
- Mina Lenox-Conyngham, An Old Ulster House; Springhill and the people who lived in it 1946 and 2005 ISBN 1-903688-38-8
