= John Staples =

Irish politician (1736–1820)

The Right Honourable John Staples KC PC
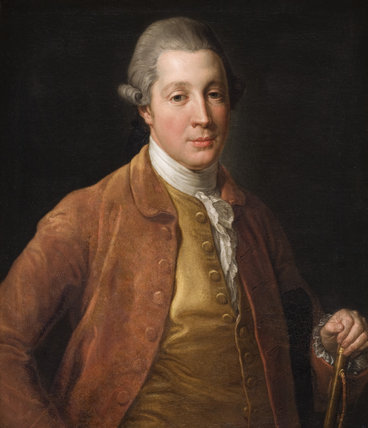

Personal details
- Born: 1 March 1736
- Died: 22 December 1820 (aged 84) Lissan House, County Tyrone
- Spouse(s): 1. Harriet Conolly (c. 1744 – 1771); 2. Henrietta Molesworth; (died 1813)
- Relatives: Sir Robert Staples, 4th Baronet (paternal grandfather); Sir Thomas Staples, 9th Baronet (son)

The Rt Hon. John Staples, M.P. (1 March 1736 – 22 December 1820), was an Irish Member of Parliament from 1765 to 1802.

He sat in the Irish House of Commons for Newtown Limavady from 1765 to 1768, for Clogher from 1768 to 1776, for Ballyshannon from 1776 to 1783, for Newtown Limavady again from 1783 to 1795 and for County Antrim from 1796 to 1801, and then for County Antrim in the new United Kingdom House of Commons from 1801 to 1802. He was made a member of the Irish Privy Council on 12 May 1801.

He was one of thirteen children of the Rev. Thomas Staples of Lissan House, and a grandson of Sir Robert Staples, 4th Baronet; his sister Alicia was the wife of Sir Robert Staples, 7th Baronet. John Staples married twice and also had thirteen children.

By his first wife Harriet (married 1764; died 1771), daughter of William James Conolly and sister of Thomas Conolly of Castletown House, his children were

- Louisa Anne (died 1833), who married Thomas Pakenham and whose son Edward inherited Castletown;
- William Conolly Staples (died 1798), who married Anne Stewart, daughter of Sir James Stewart, 7th Baronet
- Henrietta Margaret (1770–1847), who married The 2nd Earl of Clancarty.

By his second wife Henrietta (married 1774; died 1813), daughter of The 3rd Viscount Molesworth, his children included:

- Frances (died 1858), who married Richard Ponsonby, Bishop of Derry and Raphoe
- Grace Louisa (died 1860), who married The 1st Marquess of Ormonde, and
- Catherine (died 1830), who married the Ven. Robert Alexander and was the mother of Nathaniel Alexander.
- Richard Staples (died 1819)
- Charlotte Melosina (died 1847), who married William Lenox-Conyngham of Springhill House, County Londonderry;
- Elizabeth (1795–?), who married The Rev. Hugh Hamilton, Rector of Inishmacsaint, County Fermanagh, and son of Bishop Hugh Hamilton; great-grandparents of Clive Staples Lewis.
- Sir Thomas Staples, 9th Baronet (1775–1865);
- Rev. John Molesworth Staples (1776–1859), father of Sir Nathaniel Alexander Staples, 10th Baronet,
