= Sir Hercules Langrishe, 5th Baronet =

Irish peer, soldier and yachtsman

Sir Hercules Robert Langrishe (27 June 1859 - 23 October 1943) was an Irish Baronet, High Sheriff of Kilkenny. soldier and sailor, and a keen huntsman and yachtsman.

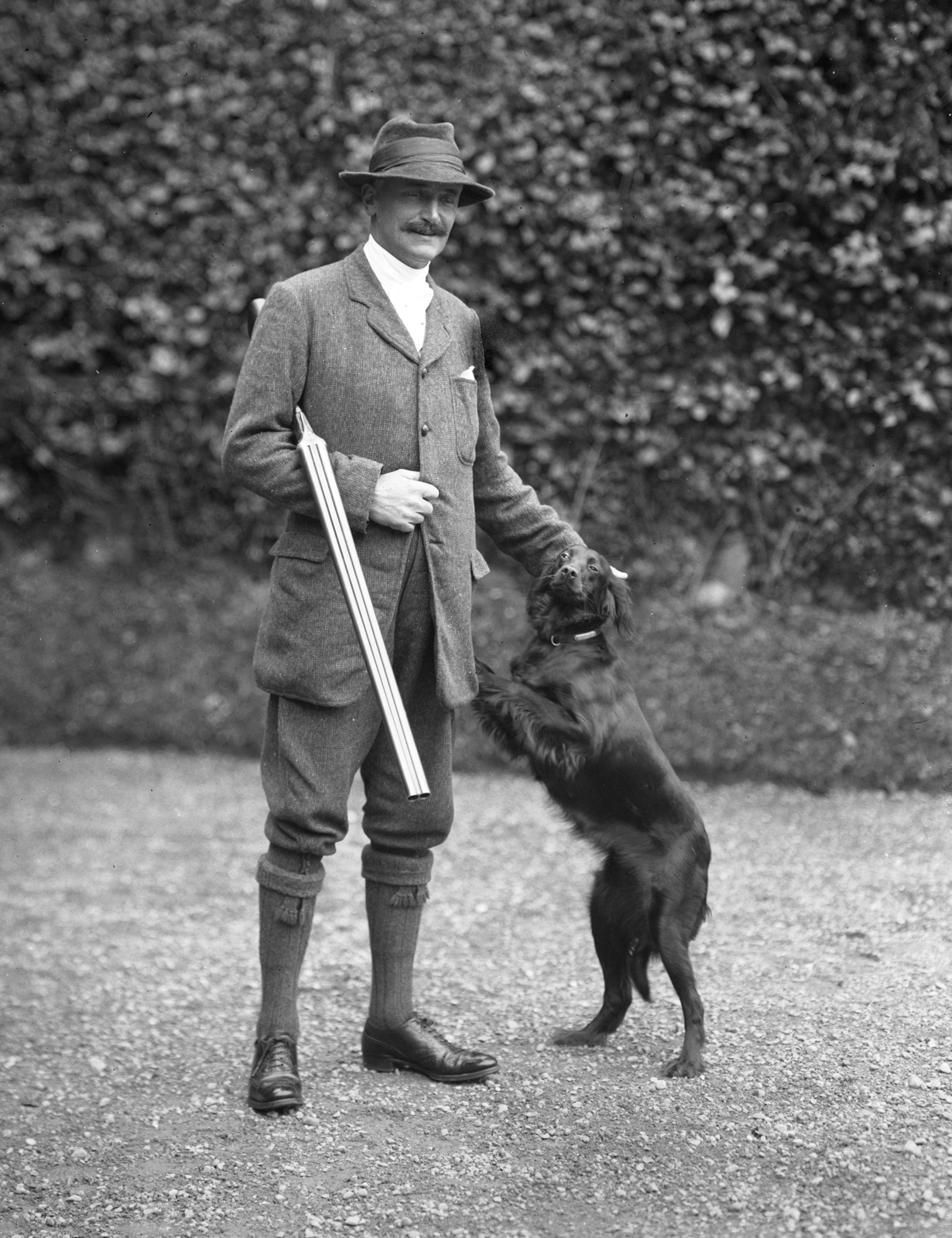
Sir Hercules Robert Langrishe (cropped)

The only son of Sir James Langrishe, 4th Baronet and Adela de Blois Eccles, daughter of Thomas de Blois Eccles of Charlemont, Staffordshire. He had five sisters, but two died in infancy. The other three, Adela, Beatrice and May, achieved some success as tennis players, as to a lesser extent did Hercules

He was educated at Malvern

In 1887 he married Helen, daughter of Rt Hon. Fitzwilliam Hume-Dick of Humewood, Co. Wicklow. They had two sons, Hercules Ralph (1888-1917) and Terence Hume(1895-1973.

He succeeded to the Baronetcy in 1910, on the death of his father, becoming the 5th of the Langrishe baronets.

His elder son, who was a Lieutenant in the Royal Flying Corps, died in a flying accident on 16 February 1917.

His younger son, therefore, succeeded to the title, as 6th Baronet.

== Military ==
He served in the 3rd Battalion of the Oxford Light Infantry, rising to the rank of Major.

He served with the Royal Navy, having been in the Royal Navy Volunteer Reserve, becoming a Commander.

== Public Service ==
He was a King's Messenger, carrying dispatches to Russia during the First World War.

He was High Sheriff of County Kilkenny in 1891.

== Yachting ==
He owned 3 yachts

- Samoena - a 94 tonne sailing yacht, for which he commissioned Charles E Nicholson to build a 20 ft cutter.
- Iernia - an 11 tonne an L&SA 5-rater designed by William Fife, built by Camper and Nicholson in 1891, which was not a success.
- Dacia - an 11 tonne L&SA 5-rater designed by Charles E Nicholson and built by Camper and Nicholsons in 1892, and was much more successful, winning, over a period of 6 weeks, every one of the 14 races she entered.

He was a member of the Royal Yacht Squadron, elected in 1887, and won the Queen's cup with Samoena in 1888.

While dining at the Squadron, in its clubhouse - Cowes Castle one night, Lord Crawford pointed to a star, observing that one day it may run into the earth. Sir Hercules Langrishe replied “If it does, I hope we will be on the starboard tack”. (Note: A reference to the Racing Rules of Sailing in which a vessel on the port tack must give way to a vessel on the starboard tack)

== Recreations and Clubs ==
In addition to Yachting his recreations included hunting and shooting. He was a Master of Foxhounds.

He was a member of the Kildare Street Club and the Marlborough Club.
