= Sir George Shee, 1st Baronet =

British official and baronet

Sir George Shee, 1st Baronet (1758–1825) was a British East India Company official, politician, and landlord. He was made a baronet in 1794.

He was Surveyor General of the Ordnance in Ireland from 1797 to 1799 and also sat in the Parliament of Ireland as the MP for Knocktopher from 1798 until the union with Great Britain in 1800.

After the union he was appointed Under-Secretary of State for the Home Department from 1800 to 1803 and Under-Secretary of State for War and the Colonies from 1806 to 1807. He was elected a Fellow of the Royal Society in 1810.

Baronetage of Ireland
New creation	Baronet (of Dunmore); 1794–1825	Succeeded by George Shee
Parliament of Ireland
Preceded by Richard Hardinge; Hercules Langrishe	Member of Parliament for Knocktopher; 1798–1801; With: Hercules Langrishe 1798–1800; Thomas Staples 1800; Stephen Mahon 1800–1801	Disenfranchised
