= Langrish (surname) =

Langrish is a surname. Notable people with this name include:

- Browne Langrish (died 1759), English physician and medical author
- Katherine Langrish (born 20th century), British author of fantasy for children and young adults
- Michael Langrish (born 1946), English Anglican bishop

== See also ==
- Langrish, a village in Hampshire, England
- Langrishe, a surname
