= Sir George Shee, 2nd Baronet =

Irish diplomat

Sir George Shee, 2nd Baronet (14 June 1785, in Calcutta – 25 January 1870, in London) was an Irish diplomat.

== Life ==
George Shee was the eldest son of Sir George Shee, 1st Baronet and Elizabeth Maria Crisp. He was educated at Sandy Mount, near Dublin, and St John's College, Cambridge, where he graduated B.A. in 1806 and M.A. in 1811. He was admitted to Gray's Inn in 1802. At Cambridge he formed a friendship with Henry John Temple, 3rd Viscount Palmerston, and supported him at elections. There resulted in 1810 an appointment for Shee as Agent-General from volunteers and disembodied militia. This position given to him by Palmerston lasted to 1817.

On 3 February 1825 Shee succeeded his father in the Shee Baronetcy, and lived at Dunmore House, Galway. He was J.P. and D.L. for Galway, and High Sheriff of County Galway in 1828.

From November 1830 to 1834 Shee served in the Whig Government as Under-Secretary of State for Foreign Affairs. He was Envoy Extraordinary and Minister Plenipotentiary to Prussia at Berlin from 1834 to 1835, Minister Plenipotentiary to Württemberg at Stuttgart from 1835 to 1844, and a diplomat to Baden from 1841 to 1844.

Shee also wrote articles on foreign policy for The Globe. He died without heir on 25 January 1870 in London.

== Family ==
On 4 January 1808 Shee married his first wife, Jane, the eldest daughter of William Young of Harley Street and Hexton Place, Hertfordshire. She died in October 1832, in a boating accident. Shee then married in 1841 Sarah, third daughter of Henry Barrett of Denton, his mistress, against social convention.

When Shee died, his estate including interests in County Durham mines passed to a nephew: he was George Edward Dering, son of Shee's sister Letitia.

Shee's maternal grandmother, Elizabeth Crisp, born Marsh, is the central character in Linda Colley's book, The Ordeal of Elizabeth Marsh.

Baronetage of Ireland
Preceded by George Shee	Baronet (of Dunmore); 1825–1870	Extinct
