= John Du Plessis Langrishe =

Lt Col John Du Plessis Langrishe FRSE DSO (11 September 1883 – 28 February 1947) was a British physician, soldier and landowner. As a trained physician he was a specialist in public health.

== Life ==
He was born on 11 September 1883 to Amitia (“Amelia”) Sneade Brown and Richard Langrishe (1834-1922). He was the great-great-grandson of Baronet Hercules Langrishe. He studied medicine at Trinity College Dublin and graduated MA MBChB around 1905.

In the First World War he served with distinction in the Royal Army Medical Corps, winning the Distinguished Service Order in 1918. After the war he remained in the RAMC and lectured in Tropical Hygiene and Public Health at the University of Edinburgh and served as Chairman of the Edinburgh University Joint Recruiting Board. In 1931 he was elected a Fellow of the Royal Society of Edinburgh. His proposers were Francis Albert Eley Crew, James Hartley Ashworth, Percy Samuel Lelean and Thomas Jones Mackie.

He died on 28 February 1947.

== Family ==
On 6 June 1914 he married Helen Dorothy Collins. They had three children, Philip John Duppa Langrishe, Dorothy Pratt Langrishe and Hugh Richard Langrishe.
