= Martin Cregan =

Irish portrait painter (1788–1870

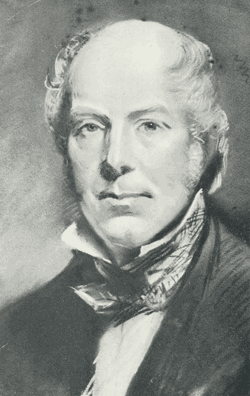
- Self portrait
- Born: circa 1788; County Meath, Kingdom of Ireland
- Died: 10 December 1870 (aged 81–82); Dublin, United Kingdom of Great Britain and Ireland
- Resting place: Mount Jerome Cemetery

Martin Cregan (1788 - 10 December 1870) was an Irish portrait painter.

== Early life and family ==
Cregan was born in 1788 in County Meath. He was raised by foster parents, called Creggan, in Martinstown, County Meath. He adopted their name, and later changed it to Cregan. While still a child, Cregan was placed in service to the Stewarts of Killymoon, County Tyrone. They recognised his artistic talent, and financed his education at the Dublin Society Schools from around 1804. While at the Schools, Cregan won medals in 1806 and 1807 for drawing. The Stewarts continued to finance his studies in London, where Cregan was a pupil of Martin Archer Shee. He was Shee's first and only pupil.

Cregan married Jane Schwertzel in London in 1816. Her father was Henry Schwertzel, from Hesse Cassel and an employee of the British Royal household. The couple had 16 children. William Stewart Cregan, the couple's fourth son, exhibited twice with the Royal Hibernian Academy (RHA) in 1860 and 1872. Cregan lived at 4 Smith's Buildings from 1834 to 1849, when he moved to 26 Kildare Street. When he retired, Cregan moved to 109 St Stephen's Green, and then later to a smaller house at 22 Lennox Street.

Cregan died at his home on Lennox Street on 10 December 1870. He was buried in Mount Jerome Cemetery. The Dublin National Gallery has a copy by him of Sir Joshua Reynolds's portrait of Master Crewe. In 1889, a posthumous portrait was painted of Cregan by Sir Thomas Jones.

== Career ==
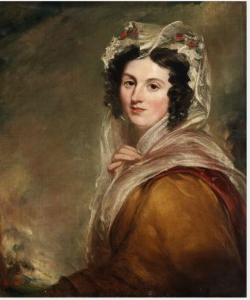
Portrait of Mrs Cregan (Jane Schwerzell)

From 1812 to 1821, whilst he resided in London, he exhibited yearly at the Royal Academy and the British Institution. He returned to Ireland, and moved to Dublin in 1822, and established himself as a portrait painter. His studio was in a residence belonging to the Stewarts at 6 Leinster Street. He was a member of the RHA from its foundation in 1823, was elected the Academy's first secretary. In 1826, at the Academy's first exhibition, he exhibited 26 paintings. He went on to exhibit with the RHA until 1859.

In October 1832, Cregan was elected the president of the RHA, after the resignation of William Cuming. He held that position for 23 years. Towards the end of his tenure, Cregan was criticised for the unsuccessful exhibitions and the growing debts of the RHA as well as his efforts to reform the organisation. Cregan supported the academy's secretary and leading reformer, Michael Angelo Hayes who was not popular with the older members. In 1856, Matthew Kendrick was elected president of the RHA, but Cregan did not accept the election and held onto the accounts, documents, and keys of the Academy. He admitted defeat in October 1857, when George Petrie was elected president. When the governmental Macleod report and a new constitution was adopted, Cregan and Hayes were reinstated.

During the height of his career, Cregan was considered one of the best portrait painters in Dublin. He painted portraits for a number of the most prominent members of Irish society and was the Lord Lieutenant's portrait painter. Later in his life, he faced competition from Stephen Catterson Smith, but Cregan continued to paint and was completing a commission for an altarpiece when he died.
