= Staples baronets =

Title in the Baronetage of Ireland

Baronet of Lissan and Faughanvale
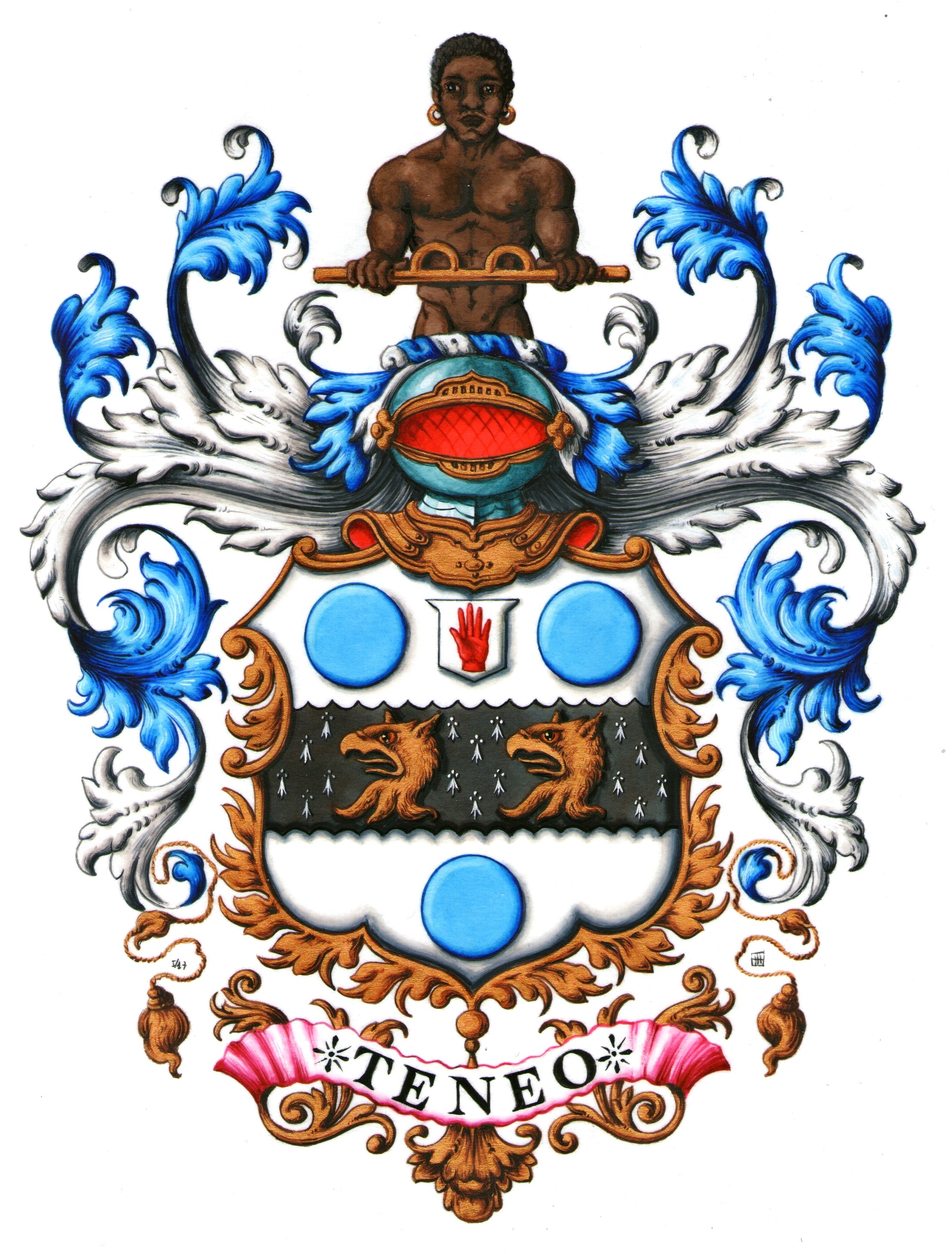
- Crest: A Demi-moor affrontee Proper holding a bolt-staple Or. Escutcheon: Argent, on a fesse engrailed sable between three hurts, as many ermine spots between two dragons’ heads erased or. Motto: Teneo (I Hold)
- Creation date: 18 July 1628
- Created by: Charles I of England
- First holder: Sir Thomas Staples
- Last holder: Sir Richard Molesworth Staples
- Status: Extinct or Dormant
- Former seat: Lissan House
- Motto: Teneo ("I Hold")

The Staples Baronetcy, of Lissan in the County of Tyrone and Faughanvale in the County of Londonderry, was a title in the Baronetage of Ireland. It was created on 18 July 1628 for Thomas Staples, who later served as High Sheriff of County Tyrone.

The long-serving MP John Staples was grandson of the fourth Baronet, brother-in-law of the seventh Baronet, father of the ninth Baronet and great-great-grandfather of the author C.S. Lewis. The lines of the Marquesses of Ormonde, Earls of Clancarty, and Barons Ponsonby and Clermont can be traced back to his daughters. The ninth Baronet was a prominent lawyer. Thomas Staples, younger brother of the tenth Baronet, was a Major-General in the British Army. The twelfth Baronet, Sir Robert Ponsonby Staples was a well-known artist, good friend of King Edward VII and member of the Café Royal set.

Following the death of the seventeenth Baronet in November 2013, the title become extinct.

The family seat was Lissan House, near Cookstown, County Tyrone.

== Staples baronets, of Lissan (1628) ==
- Sir Thomas Staples, 1st Baronet (died 1653)
- Sir Baptist Staples, 2nd Baronet (1630–1672)
- Sir Alexander Staples, 3rd Baronet (died 1673)
- Sir Robert Staples, 4th Baronet (died 1714)
- Sir John Staples, 5th Baronet (1684–1730)
- Sir Alexander Staples, 6th Baronet (1693–1741)
- Sir Robert Staples, 7th Baronet (1740–1816)
- Sir Robert Staples, 8th Baronet (1772–1832)
- Sir Thomas Staples, 9th Baronet (1775–1865)
- Sir Nathaniel Alexander Staples, 10th Baronet (1817–1899)
- Sir John Molesworth Staples, 11th Baronet (1848–1933)
- Sir Robert Ponsonby Staples, 12th Baronet (1853–1943)
- Sir Robert George Alexander Staples, 13th Baronet (1894–1970)
- Sir John Richard Staples, 14th Baronet (1906–1989)
- Sir Thomas Staples, 15th Baronet (1905–1997)
- Sir Gerald James Arland Staples, 16th Baronet (1909–1999)
- Sir Richard Molesworth Staples, 17th and last Baronet (1914–2013)

== Arms ==
Coat of arms of Staples baronets

Crest
A demi-negro affrontee Proper holding a bolt-staple Or.
Escutcheon
Argent on a fess engrailed Ermine between three hurts a dragon's head erased Or.
Motto
Teneo

== See also ==
- Lissan House (contains significantly more information about the baronets)
