= Sir Robert Staples, 12th Baronet =

Sir Robert Ponsonby Staples
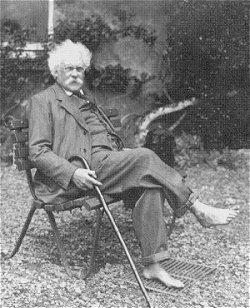
- Died: 18 October 1943 (aged 90)
- Education: Royal Academy
- Spouse: Ada Louise Stammers

Sir Robert Ponsonby Staples, 12th Baronet (1853–1943) was an artist, also remembered for his eccentricity.

== Life ==
He was the third son of Sir Nathaniel Staples, 11th Baronet of Lissan House near Cookstown in County Tyrone. He became one of Ulster's best known artists. Known as the "barefoot baronet", he refused to wear shoes as he believed that leather soles would block out natural electricity from the earth and thus impair the health. He would travel to Belfast solely to walk on the tramlines as he believed this extra boost of electricity would be especially beneficial.

Staples was born in Dundee and began the study of architecture at the Catholic University of Leuven at the age of 12 followed by spells in Dresden, Paris and London where he trained as an artist.

Staples lived in Edwardian London and was in the Café Royal set that included Sir William Orpen, Lily Langtry, Sophie Guilbert and King Edward VII. He was also involved in the establishment of the Grosvenor Gallery, founded by Sir Coutts Lindsay and his wife Blanche Fitzroy as an alternative exhibition space to the Royal Academy.

Staples finally settled at Lissan in 1912 after the death of his elder brother James Head Staples who had been looking after the estate while Sir John Staples, their eldest brother, was in an asylum. He remained there for the rest of his life, sketching and painting his children, grandchildren and local people. He made sketches on his travels. By the time of his death in 1943, his family were financially very strained.

A memorial plaque was unveiled at Lissan House by the Ulster History Circle.

== Works ==
His first picture was accepted by the Royal Academy when he was only 22 years old and he exhibited there throughout his life. His place in London society is reflected in his paintings, which include portraits of important politicians, actors, churchmen, artists, and monarchy in England. Staples also worked as an illustrator and cartoonist to 'The Sketch', 'The Illustrated London News' and 'The Graphic'.

In 1905 he produced several triptychs depicting shipbuilding and linen manufacture, to be exhibited in the new city hall at Belfast; however, these were rejected by the city council, possibly for political reasons.

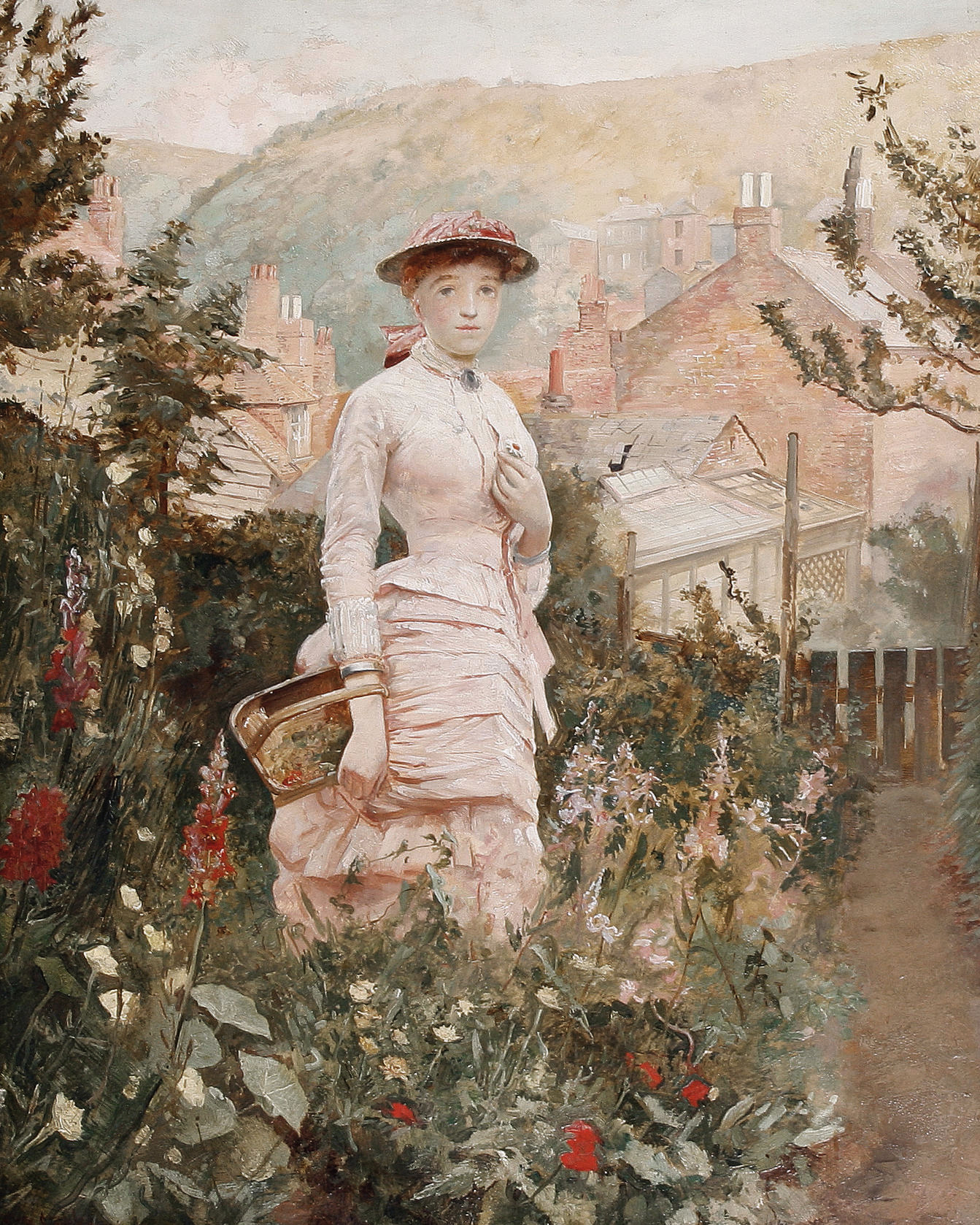
Ada Louise Stammers, the artist's wife (Robert Ponsonby Staples)

His most famous painting, The Ideal Cricket Match, now hanging in the Pavilion at Lord's Cricket Ground, shows an imaginary match founding the Ashes tournament between Australia and England. Other noted works include Cardinal Manning’s Last Reception (at the Archiepiscopal Palace of the Archbishop of Westminster), The Last Shot at Queen's Club (now in Worthing Museum & Art Gallery) and Gladstone Introducing the Home Rule Bill (now hanging in the House of Lords).

Staples's diaries survived at Lissan House. Its collection of his paintings was mostly sold in a studio auction at Phillips in London in 1991 which was organised by his granddaughter, Hazel Radclyffe Dolling, to fund restoration work. The Lissan collection is now composed mainly of family portraits.

== Arms ==
Coat of arms of Sir Robert Staples, 12th Baronet

Crest
A demi-negro affrontee Proper holding a bolt-staple Or.
Escutcheon
Argent on a fess engrailed Ermine between three hurts a dragon's head erased Or.
Motto
Teneo

Baronetage of Ireland
Preceded by John Molesworth Staples	Baronet (of Lissan); 1933–1943	Succeeded by Robert George Alexander Staples
