= Knocktopher (Parliament of Ireland constituency) =

Pre-1801 Irish constituency

- Former borough constituency for the Irish House of Commons
- County: County Kilkenny
- Borough: Knocktopher

–1801
- Seats: 2
- Replaced by: Disfranchised

Knocktopher was a potwalloper constituency represented in the Irish House of Commons until 1800, based on the parliamentary borough of Knocktopher in County Kilkenny.

== History ==
In the Patriot Parliament of 1689 summoned by James II, Knocktopher was represented with two members. Thereafter electors had to be Protestant and an inhabitant six months resident before the election. The person in the office of potreeve rather than the seneschal of the manor made the return.

In the eighteenth century two prominent families nominated the constituency's two parliamentary members; the Langrishes of Knocktopher Abbey, and the Ponsonbys, who paid them £500 for the privilege. This arrangement lasted up to 1783. Knocktopher had Sir Hercules Langrishe as the one qualified voter in 1783-4. He contrived to possess or manage control of all the properties with houses in the town, ensuring they were not let to potential Protestants voters, and so the right of election was concentrated in his family and their immediate connections.

== Members of Parliament ==
- 1661–1666 Sir Patrick Weymes (died and replaced 1661 by James Weymes) and Oliver Jones (died and replaced 1664 by Sir Maurice Eustace, junior, representative to 1666)

=== 1689–1801 ===
Election	First MP	Second MP
1689	Harvy Morris	Henry Meagh
1689	Harvy Morris	Redmond Purcell
1692	William Robinson	Anthony Maude (Note: Declared not duly elected in 1692.)
1695	Edward Worth	Blayney Sandford
1713	Edward Worth	Roscarrick Dunkin
1715	Edward Worth	William Wall
1741	Benjamin Burton	William Wall
1747	Benjamin Burton	Richard Ponsonby
1761	Sir William Fownes, 2nd Bt	Hercules Langrishe (Note: Created a baronet in 1777.)
1776	Andrew Caldwell	Hercules Langrishe
1783	Robert Langrishe	Hercules Langrishe
1796	Richard Hardinge	Hercules Langrishe
1798	Sir George Shee, 1st Bt	Hercules Langrishe
March 1800	Sir George Shee, 1st Bt	Thomas Staples (Note: Last surviving member of the Irish House of Commons.)
April 1800	Sir George Shee, 1st Bt	Stephen Mahon
1801	Disenfranchised	

== Bibliography ==
- O'Hart, John (2007). The Irish and Anglo-Irish Landed Gentry: When Cromwell came to Ireland. Vol. II. Heritage Books. ISBN 978-0-7884-1927-0.
- Leigh Rayment's historical List of Members of the Irish House of Commons. Cites: Johnston-Liik, Edith Mary (2002). The History of the Irish Parliament 1692-1800 (6 volumes). Ulster Historical Foundation.
