= Langrishe baronets =

Title in the Baronetage of Ireland

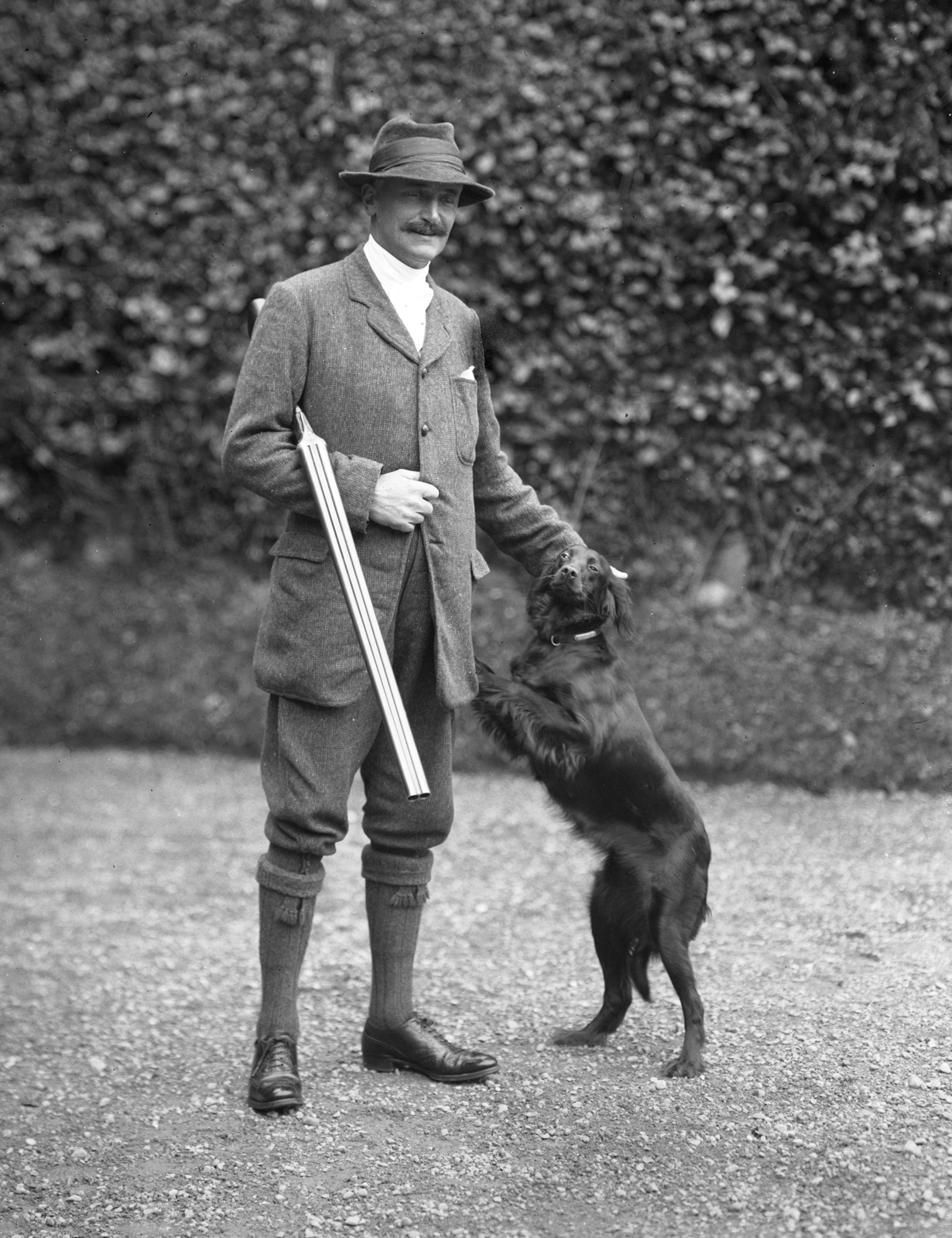
Sir Hercules Langrishe, 5th Bt. 25 March 1913

The Langrishe Baronetcy, of Knocktopher Abbey in the County of Kilkenny, is a title in the Baronetage of Ireland. It was created on 19 February 1777 for Sir Hercules Langrishe, who represented Knocktopher in the Irish House of Commons.

The family seat from 1679 to 1981 was Knocktopher Abbey, near Knocktopher, County Kilkenny.

== Langrishe baronets, of Knocktopher Abbey (1777) ==
- Sir Hercules Langrishe, 1st Baronet (1731–1811)
- Sir Robert Langrishe, 2nd Baronet (1756–1835)
- Sir Hercules Richard Langrishe, 3rd Baronet (1782–1862)
- Sir James Langrishe, 4th Baronet (1823–1910)
- Sir Hercules Robert Langrishe, 5th Baronet (1859–1943)
- Sir Terence Hume Langrishe, 6th Baronet (1895–1973)
- Sir Hercules Ralph Hume Langrishe, 7th Baronet (1927–1998), married Grania Wingfield
- Sir James Hercules Langrishe, 8th Baronet (born 1957)

The heir apparent is the present holder's son Richard James Hercules Langrishe (born 1988).

Coat of arms of Langrishe baronets
| Crest A lion rampant per fess Or and Sable. Escutcheon Quarterly Or and Sable four covered cups counterchanged. Motto Medio Tuttissimus Ibis |

== Family history ==
The Langrishes were probably its most famous residents of Knocktopher, their influence and impact lasting through the generations to the present day. The Langrishe's seat for nearly 300 years, until 1981, was Knocktopher Abbey.

We are indebted to the permission of Art Kavanagh for these detailed references in the chapter of his book, "Langrishe of Knocktopher", in a book entitled Kilkenny: The Landed Gentry & Aristocracy (pub 2004).

It is believed that John Langrishe (1660–1735) was the first to arrive in Knocktopher. After his first wife, Sarah Sanford, died in 1684 he then married Hon. Alice Blaney, daughter of Harry the 2nd Lord Blaney and widow of Thomas Sandford. Alice inherited the lands at Knocktopher when Thomas died in 1679. After Alice died, John became owner of those lands and married for a third time in 1695, to Mary Grace, with whom he had a child. According to Kilkenny: History and Society (1990), by Willian Nolan and Kevin Phelan, Robert Langrishe completed the outright purchase of the fee simple of their Knocktopher lands of over 800 acres in 1757, lands that had previously been held by them on a lease of lives renewable since 1698. Although John was married five times he had only one child, a son Robert (1706–1770), who succeeded John when he died in 1735. Robert was married twice, and he had one surviving son, Hercules Langrishe (Herky, 1731–1811). Five of the eight Langrishe Baronets were named Hercules, and the current heir to the 9th Baronet title is also called Hercules (born 1988).

Hercules was one of the members of the Irish House of Commons for Knocktopher for 40 years, from 1761 until coming into effect of the Act of Union 1800 on 1 January 1801, when the borough was disfranchised. It is claimed that he achieved that remarkable feat of that time by buying up Knocktopher property and leasing it to Catholic residents. Hercules held posts of Commissioner of Revenue from 1774 to 1801 and of Excise from 1780 to 1801. He was honoured by being created a baronet in 1777, thus becoming the 1st Langrishe Baronet, and was appointed privy councillor in 1786. He is, arguably, best remembered for his pro-Catholic Relief stance and his exchanges with his friend Edmund Burke on the issue. Sir Hercules introduced the landmark Catholic Relief Bill in 1792. He seconded the second Bill in 1793, passed as the Roman Catholic Relief Act 1793, giving the vote to Catholic landowners of a certain value. Sir Hercules and his wife Sarah Myhill of Killerney had six children, three sons and three daughters.

Their eldest son, Robert (1756–1835), graduated from the King's Inns and was called to the bar. He became an MP for Knocktopher (1783–1796), where both father and son sat together in the Houses of Parliament. In 1782 he married an heiress, Anne Boyle, a granddaughter of the Archbishop of Armagh. In 1796 he too became a Revenue Commissioner. After Sir Hercules died in 1811, Robert became the 2nd Baronet, Sir Robert Langrishe. He was heavily involved in theatre. And after he died in 1835 his second son, Hercules Richard (1782–1862), who had entered the Church, became the 3rd Baronet, Rev Sir Hercules Langrishe. They had eight children with his wife, Maria Cottingham. Sir James Langrishe (1823–1910) as 4th Baronet succeeded Rev Sir Hercules when he died in 1862. He married twice, became Lt Col. in the Army and High Sheriff of County Kilkenny 1866. They had one son, Hercules, and five daughters. Hercules Robert ("Herky", 1859–1943) graduated from Trinity College Dublin in 1753 and succeeded Robert when he died in 1770 as Sir Hercules Robert Langrishe the 5th Baronet. He was by all accounts a dashing young aristocrat, who developed connections to Edward VII. In 1904 Hercules invited Edward VII, whom he knew well, and Queen Alexandra to visit Knocktopher Abbey. The invitation was accepted but it backfired over a prank and the visit never happened. He was High Sheriff in 1891 and reached deputy lieutenant of the county and served in Russia. He married Lady Helen Hume Dick and they had two sons.

In 1943 his son Sir Terence Hume Langrishe (Pingo, 1895–1973) became the 6th Baronet and served in World War I and World War II. He became a Lloyd's name. He married Joan Grigg with whom he had three sons and the eldest, Sir Hercules Ralph Hume Langrishe (Heck, 1927–1998), succeeded him as the 7th Baronet in 1973. He had attended Eton before joining the Army and marrying Lady Grania Wingfield, daughter of The 9th Viscount Powerscourt. They had four children, including one son who succeeded him in 1998 - Sir James Hercules Langrishe, the 8th Baronet (1957– ). Another son, Patrick, was the father of the actress Caroline Langrishe.

The 9th Baronet's heir apparent is the present holder's son, Richard James Hercules Langrishe (born 1988).
