= Sir Hercules Langrishe, 1st Baronet =

Irish politician, died 1811

Sir Hercules Langrishe, 1st Baronet (1729 – 1 February 1811) was an Irish politician.

== Life and career ==
He was the only son of Robert Langrishe of Knocktopher, County Kilkenny and Anne Whitby, daughter of Jonathan Whitby of Kilcreggan, and educated at Trinity College, Dublin, where he graduated B.A. in 1763. He was a commissioner of barracks 1766–74, supervisor of accounts 1767–75, commissioner of revenue 1774–1801, and commissioner of excise 1780–1801. After the Act of Union 1800 he played no further role in politics.

He was first elected to represent Knocktopher in the Irish House of Commons in May 1761, and sat until he resigned his seat in March 1800. In 1776 he was also returned for Callan, but was declared not duly elected. He was strongly attached to the "unreformed" Parliament, but also supported Henry Grattan in his move to make it genuinely independent of the British Parliament.

He was a strong supporter of relaxation of the Penal Laws against Catholics, and was one of the principal sponsors of the Catholic Relief Act 1793. His views are said to have been influenced by his lifelong friendship with Edmund Burke, who wrote an open "Letter to Sir H. Langrishe" in 1792, encouraging his efforts to secure relief for Catholics from the rigours of the Penal Laws.

On 19 February 1777 he was created a Baronet, of Knocktopher, County Kilkenny, in the Baronetage of Ireland. On 27 February 1792, he was appointed to the Irish Privy Council. Though he frequently supported the Government in the Commons, he prided himself on his independence of mind. He was noted for his wide culture and personal charm.

In Dublin, he was a member of Daly's Club.

== Family ==
He married Hannah, the daughter and coheiress of Robert Myhill of Killerney, County Kilkenny, and sister of Jane Myhill, who married Charles Loftus, 1st Marquess of Ely. He and Hannah had two sons and three daughters. The elder son Robert succeeded as second baronet, and died in 1835, having sat in the Irish parliament as M.P. for Knocktopher from 1796 to 1800. The second son James was archdeacon of Glendalough, dean of Achonry, and rector of Newcastle Lyons, and Killishin, County Carlow. Langrishe's daughter Elizabeth married the Reverend Christopher Robinson, Rector of Granard, only son of the eminent judge Christopher Robinson and had several children, including Sir Bryan Robinson, who was a judge like his grandfather, and Admiral Hercules Robinson, father of Hercules Robinson, 1st Baron Rosmead.

Hercules Langrishe was the great-great-grandfather of Lt Col John Du Plessis Langrishe FRSE.

== Arms ==
Coat of arms of Sir Hercules Langrishe, 1st Baronet
Crest A lion rampant per fess Or and Sable. Escutcheon Quarterly Or and Sable four covered cups counterchanged. Motto Medio Tuttissimus Ibis

Baronetage of Ireland
New creation	Baronet (of Knocktopher Abbey); 1777–1811	Succeeded by Robert Langrishe
