= Desart Court =

Former Palladian house and estate in County Kilkenny

- Lios Loinín
- Interactive map of the Desart Court area

General information
- Status: Private dwelling house
- Type: House
- Architectural style: Palladian
- Location: County Kilkenny, Ireland, Ireland
- Coordinates: 52.58678°N 7.35264°W
- Completed: 1733
- Renovated: 1923 destroyed by fire and rebuilt
- Demolished: 1957

Technical details
- Material: blue limestone
- Floor count: 3

Design and construction
- Architect: Edward Lovett Pearce
- Developer: John Cuffe, 1st Baron Desart

Renovating team
- Architect: Richard Orpen (1923)

Desart Court was a palladian house in County Kilkenny, Ireland, built around 1733 for the first Lord Desart, John Cuffe. The architect is believed to have been Sir Edward Lovett Pearce.

== History ==
Around 5,000 acres of confiscated land near the barony of Shillelogher, County Kilkenny were granted to Cromwellian adventurer Joseph Cuffe in 1654. From 1666, the lands of lislonen (Lios Loinín) were to be known as Cuffe's Desert while Tullaghane were to be known as Cuffe's Grove.

Around 1733, John Cuffe, 1st Baron Desart, son of Williamite soldier Agmondesham Cuffe, developed a modern house on the lands.

On the death of the 1st Baron Desart in 1749, the house and title passed to his son John Cuffe, 2nd Baron Desart who died without a male heir in 1767.

Circa 1758-62, the architect James Hoban was born on the estate. He later went on to design the White House in Washington, D.C..

The house then passed down to Otway Cuffe on 25 November 1767. He was soon raised to Earl of Desart on 4 December 1793 and was succeeded by his eldest son John Otway Cuffe, 2nd Earl of Desart in 1804.

William Cuffe, 4th Earl of Desart, the 4th Earl is recorded as having 8,000 acres in County Kilkenny in 1876 with a valuation of £5,778 as well as 932 acres in Tipperary. He married Odette Bischoffsheim, later Ellen Cuffe, Countess of Desart.

=== 1923 destruction and rebuild ===
The house was largely destroyed by fire in February 1923 when it was burned by the IRA as part of a larger episode of the Destruction of Irish country houses that were linked to the ascendancy.

A new house was rebuilt on the site in 1926 using some of the original building materials by Lady Kathleen Milborne-Swinnerton-Pilkington and designed by Richard Orpen. Much of the grounds and house were later sold to the Land commission in 1934 with the wings being demolished in the 1940s ⁣⁣and the main house subsequently torn down in 1957.

=== Building ===
The house was a two-storey core building with a raised basement, linked to two-storey wings, and was designed in what was then a fashionable Palladian style. The roof was surrounded by a balustrade and topped with urns while a split staircase with balustrade lead to the raised first floor and Piano nobile at the front of the house. Inside there were elaborate plasterwork ceilings and two notable staircases described as "handsome carved scroll-work in oak, in lieu of balusters" which was found no place else in Ireland although Sopwell Hall and Cashel Palace both contain two staircases.

The interior of the house contained fine rococo plasterwork and cornices featuring unusual heads and masks similar to that which appears at Florence Court and furnishings from the middle of the 18th century including Chinese Chippendale chairs and inlaid Dutch cabinetry. The plasterwork looks to have been completed later than the main house around 1750-60.

The house was considered a superlative example of its kind. The architect has been referenced often as Edward Lovett Pearce who was the pre-eminent architect working in Ireland at the time and who died in 1733, although no firm evidence survives. A few feet above one of the main doors, a carved stone entablature contained "Anno Don. [sic] 1733" although this could also be a reference to John Cuffe being made a baron in the same year. Another possible candidate is Richard Castle who was active around the same period and took over many of Lovett Pearce's engagements upon his death. The plan of the house was also similar to the Cashel Palace which was likely designed by Lovett Pearce.

=== Gallery ===
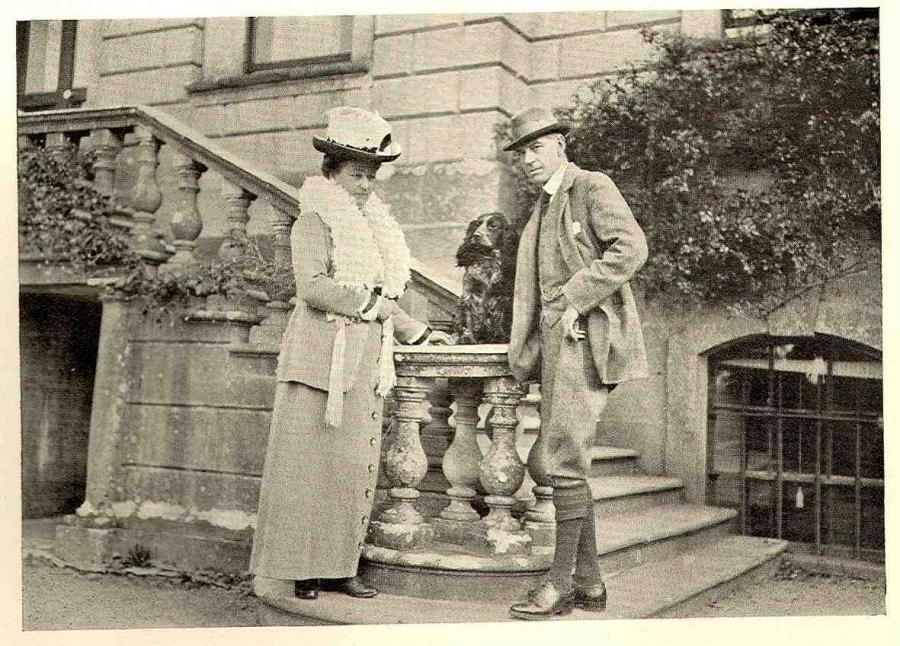
William and Ellen Cuffe on the lower front steps of Desart Court

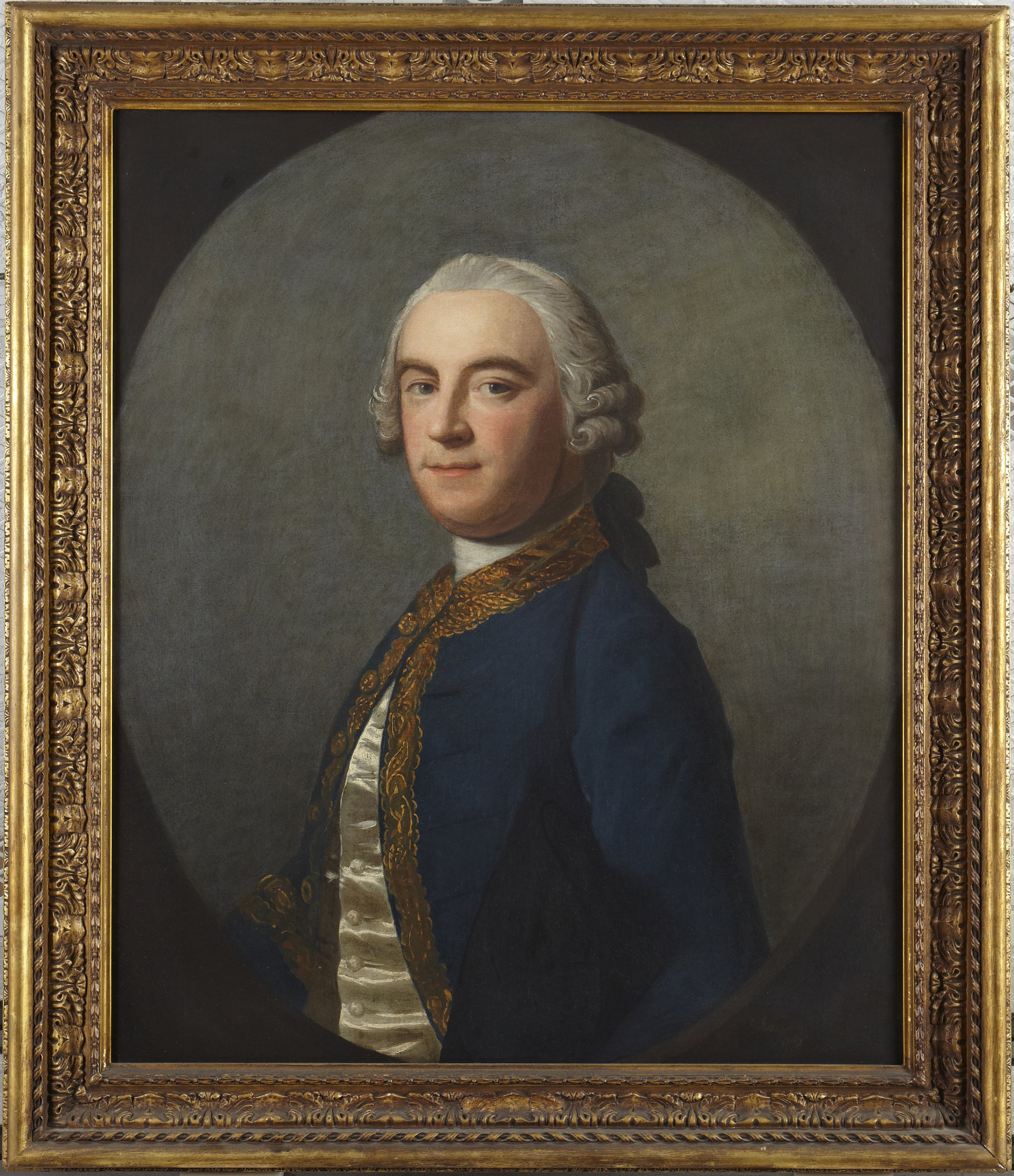
John Cuffe, Second Baron Desart, 1751

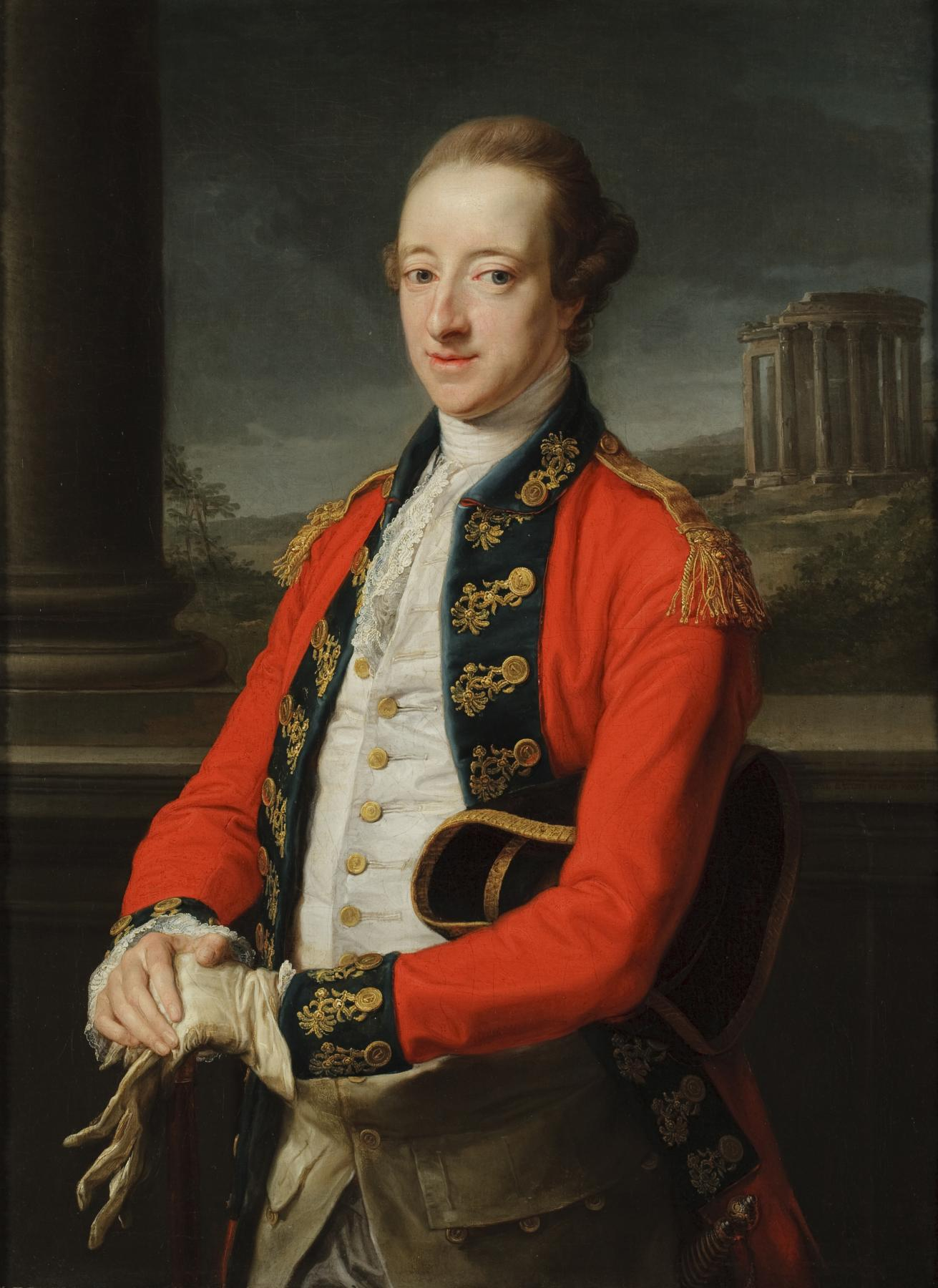
Otway Cuffe, 1st Earl of Desart, by Pompeo Girolamo Batoni, 1769

== See also ==
- Summerhill House
