= John Cuffe (disambiguation) =

John Cuffe was a cricketer.

John Cuffe may also refer to:

- John Cuffe, 1st Baron Desart (died 1749), Anglo-Irish politician and peer
- John Cuffe, 2nd Earl of Desart
- John Cuffe, 3rd Earl of Desart (1818–1865), Irish Conservative politician.
