= Hamilton Cuffe, 5th Earl of Desart =

Irish peer and barrister (1848–1934)

The Right Honourable The Earl of Desart KP KCB PC
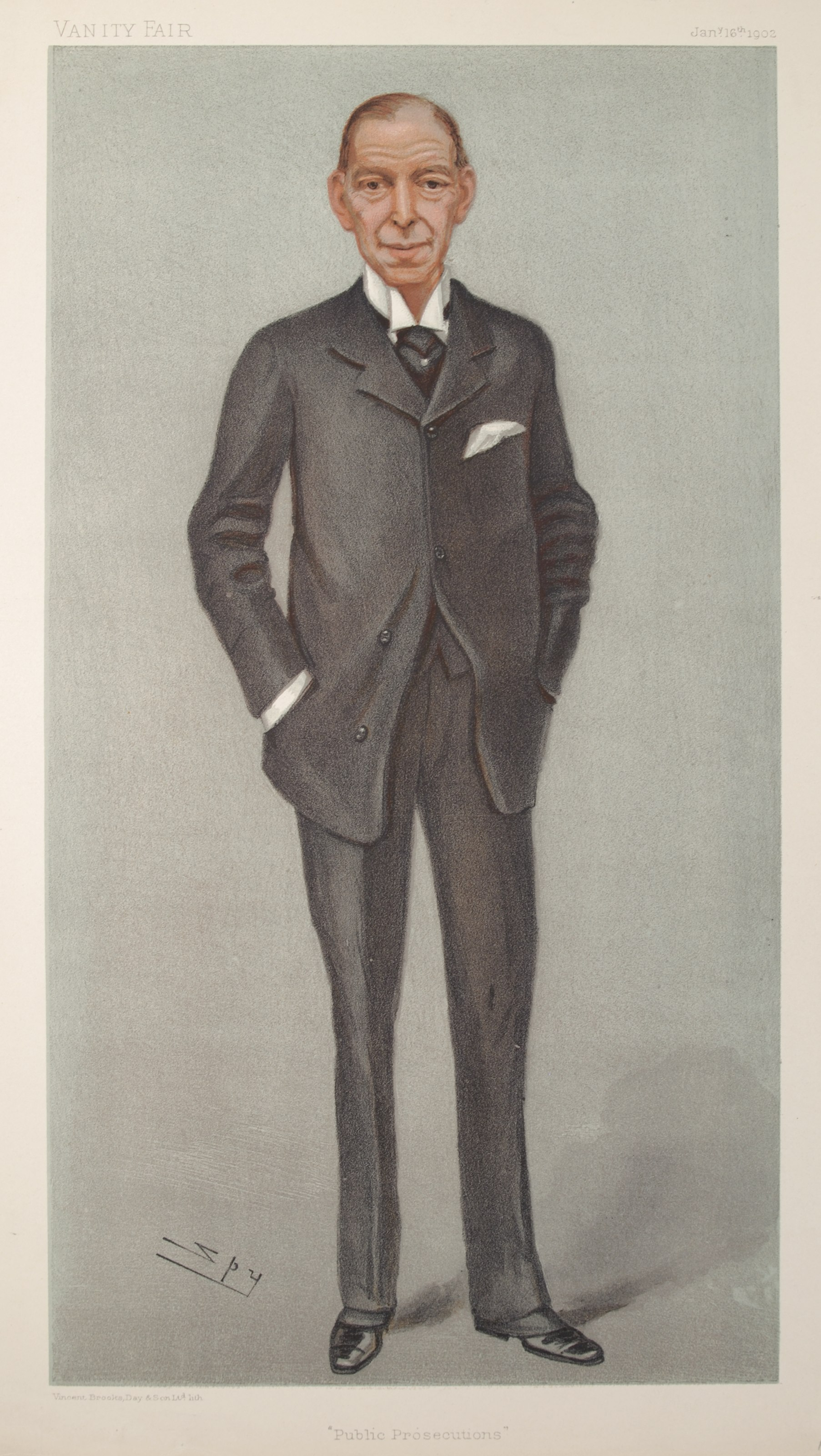
- "Public Prosecutions"; The Earl of Desart as caricatured by Spy (Leslie Ward) in Vanity Fair, January 1902.

Lord Lieutenant of Kilkenny
- In office 1920–1922
- Preceded by: The Marquess of Ormonde
- Succeeded by: Post abolished

HM Procurator General and Treasury Solicitor
- In office 1894–1909
- Preceded by: Sir Augustus Stephenson
- Succeeded by: Sir John Mellor, Bt.

Director of Public Prosecutions
- In office 1894–1908
- Preceded by: Sir Augustus Stephenson
- Succeeded by: Sir Charles Mathews, Bt.

Personal details
- Born: 30 August 1848 Richmond, Surrey
- Died: 4 November 1934 (aged 86) Marylebone, London
- Party: Conservative
- Spouse: Lady Margaret Joan Lascelles (m. 1876; died 1927)
- Children: Lady Joan Elizabeth Cuffe; Lady Sybil Marjorie Cuffe
- Parent(s): The 3rd Earl of Desart; Lady Elizabeth Campbell

Hamilton John Agmondesham Cuffe, 5th Earl of Desart, KP, KCB, PC (30 August 1848 – 4 November 1934), was an Irish peer and barrister.

== Early life ==
Cuffe was the second son of the 3rd Earl of Desart and his wife, Lady Elizabeth Campbell. He had an older sister, Lady Alice Mary Cuffe, and brother, William Cuffe, and a younger brother, Captain Otway Cuffe. His older sister married the 5th Baron Henniker, and was the mother of twelve children.

His paternal grandparents were the 2nd Earl of Desart and Catherine, daughter of Maurice O'Connor. His mother was the third daughter of the 1st Earl of Cawdor (a son of the 1st Baron Cawdor) and Lady Elizabeth Thynne, daughter of the 2nd Marquess of Bath.

== Career ==
In his early life, he was a midshipman in the Royal Navy, before becoming a barrister in 1872. In 1877, he was appointed as a secretary to the Judicature Committee and as a solicitor to The Treasury a year later. In 1894, he was appointed a Companion of the Order of the Bath and as Treasury Solicitor that year, as well as Queen's Proctor and Director of Public Prosecutions.

From 1917 to 1918, Lord Desart participated as an Unionist delegate to the Irish Convention.

In 1920, he was also appointed Lord Lieutenant of Kilkenny, a post he held until the Irish Free State was formed in December 1922, when all lord lieutenancies of Ireland (bar those of Northern Ireland) were abolished.

=== Peerage ===
In 1898, he inherited the earldom of Desart from his elder brother, William (who died without heirs male) and was promoted as a Knight Commander of the Order of the Bath.

In 1909, Desart was created Baron Desart in the Peerage of the United Kingdom, which enabled him to sit in the House of Lords (his other titles being in the Peerage of Ireland, which did not entitle him to a seat). In 1913, he was sworn of the Privy Council and appointed a Knight of the Order of St Patrick in 1919.

== Personal life ==
On 19 July 1876, the future Lord Desart had married his second cousin, Lady Margaret Joan Lascelles (1853–1927), the second daughter of the 4th Earl of Harewood by his first wife, Lady Elizabeth Joanna de Burgh, daughter of the 1st Marquess of Clanricarde. They had two daughters:

- Lady Joan Elizabeth Mary Cuffe (1877–1951), who married Sir Harry Lloyd-Verney. They had issue; three sons and one daughter, Joan Verena Verney (who died aged 30), mother of the 10th Viscount Boyne (1931–1995).
- Lady Sybil Marjorie Cuffe (1879–1943), who married (1) 30 April 1901 William Bayard Cutting Jr. (1878-1910), son of William Bayard Cutting and then secretary to the US embassy to the Court of St. James's, by whom she had one daughter, Iris Origo (1902–1988); (2) 23 April 1918 (div 1926) Geoffrey Scott (1884–1929), Bernard Berenson's secretary and an architectural historian, by whom she had no issue; (3) 8 December 1926 Percy Lubbock (1879–1965), nephew of the 1st Baron Avebury. Lady Sybil Lubbock died on 31 December 1943, and was survived by her third husband, her daughter Iris Origo, and two surviving granddaughters.

As Desart was the last male descendant of the 1st Earl and died without male heirs in 1934, his titles became extinct.

Legal offices
Preceded by Sir Augustus Stephenson	HM Procurator General and Treasury Solicitor; 1894–1909	Succeeded by Sir John Mellor, 1st Baronet
Preceded by Sir Augustus Stephenson	Director of Public Prosecutions; 1894–1908	Succeeded by Sir Charles Mathews
Honorary titles
Preceded by The Marquess of Ormonde	Lord Lieutenant of Kilkenny; 1920–1922	Post abolished (Irish Free State)
Peerage of Ireland
Preceded by William Cuffe	Earl of Desart; 1898–1934	Extinct
Peerage of the United Kingdom
New creation	Baron Desart; 1909–1934	Extinct
