= La Foce =

Villa in Tuscany, Italy

La Foce is a large estate that lies close to the towns of Montepulciano, Chiusi, and Chianciano Terme in the Southern Tuscan region of Val d'Orcia, midway between Florence and Rome.

== History ==
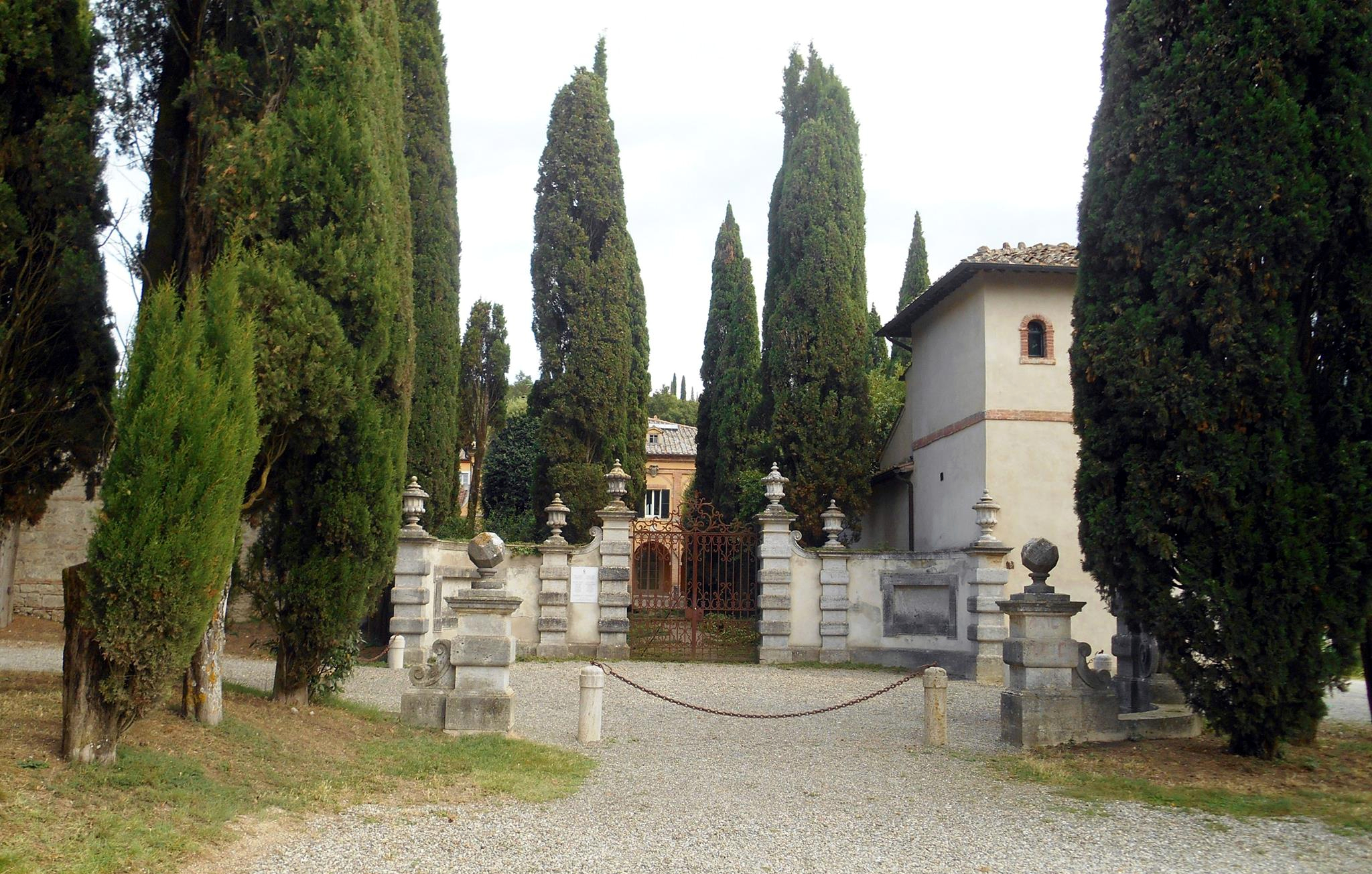
La Foce in 2016

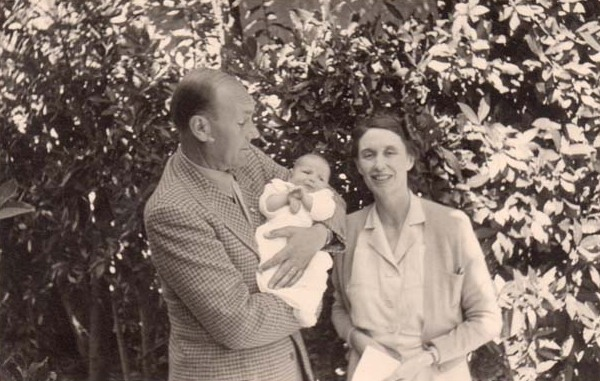
Antonio and Iris Origo with daughter Donata at La Foce, 1943

La Foce lies on the Via Francigena, the ancient road and pilgrim route running from France to Rome). It has been inhabited continuously for many centuries. The Villa was built in the late 15th century as a hospice for pilgrims and merchants traveling on the Via Francigena. It is located near an Etruscan settlement, and a burial-place from the 7th century BC to the 2nd century AD has been excavated there.

=== Restoration ===
In 1924, writer Iris Origo, granddaughter of William Bayard Cutting and Hamilton Cuffe, 5th Earl of Desart, joined Antonio Origo, son of Marchese Clemente Origo in buying the dilapidated estate. They moved there after their marriage. The late 15th-century villa was restored by the Origos in the 1920s with government financial assistance. The fine gardens were designed by the English architect Cecil Pinsent – "the last great Italian garden by Pinsent" in the words of horticulturist television presenter Monty Don. Pinsent had created several other gardens in Tuscany, including those at Villa Le Balze and Villa I Tatti, where Iris's mother was a frequent guest of Bernard Berenson, who had commissioned Pinsent's first Italian garden about twenty years earlier.

The Origos employed 25 families and started a school to teach and ensure the well-being of some 50 local children. They also built 35 dwellings in the 1920s to 1930s for tenant farmers.

After the deaths of Iris and Antonio, their daughters Benedetta and Donata sold off about two-thirds of the estate and divided the rest between them. Descendants of the family still own the property today and operate it as a resort.

== In popular culture ==
The book War in Val d'Orcia by Iris Origo is set at this estate, which at the time contained 57 farms on 7,000 acres (2833 ha).

The gardens of La Foce as well as a short interview with Benedetta Origo are featured in an episode of Monty Don's Italian Gardens.

== Legacy ==
Incontri in Terra di Siena, an international music festival, is held at Castelluccio, a medieval castle on the property. It is held in memory of the Origos each July.
