= Images and Shadows =

Book by Iris Origo

- Author: Iris Origo
- Genre: Autobiography
- Publisher: John Murray
- Publication date: 1970

Images and Shadows: Part of a Life is a book by Iris Origo, the Irish-American writer who spent most of her life in Italy. She owned and lived in the Tuscan estate of La Foce. It was first published by John Murray in 1970.

The autobiography encompasses Origo's affluent New York/Long Island background, her childhood in Villa Medici in Fiesole and her progression to the Anglo-American artistic coterie in Florence; it then goes on to her marriage to an Italian (Antonio Origo) and, after the war, her life as an established author.
