= Standish James O'Grady =

Irish author, journalist, and historian

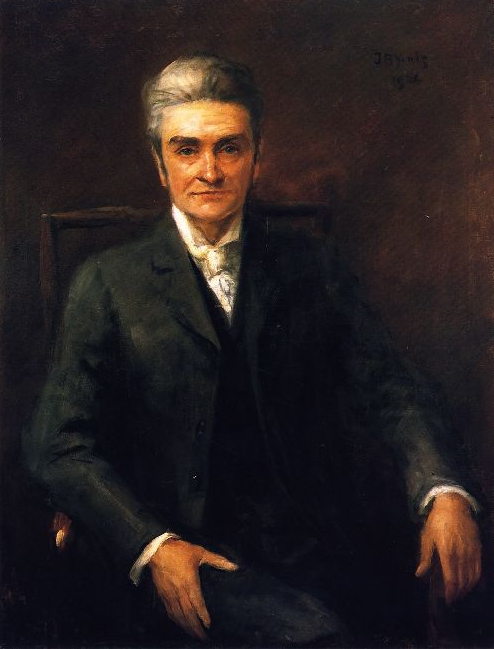
- Born: 22 March 1846; Castletownbere, County Cork, Ireland
- Died: 18 May 1928 (aged 81); Shanklin, Isle of Wight, Hampshire, England
- Education: Trinity College, Dublin
- Occupations: Journalist, historian, writer
- Writing career
- Notable work: History of Ireland: Heroic Period
- Movement: Celtic Revival

Standish James O'Grady (18 September 1846 – 18 May 1928) was an Irish author, journalist, and historian. O'Grady was inspired by Sylvester O'Halloran and played a formative role in the Celtic Revival, publishing the tales of Irish mythology, as the History of Ireland: Heroic Period (1878), arguing that the Gaelic tradition had rival only from the tales of Homeric Greece. O'Grady was a paradox for his times, proud of his Gaelic heritage, he was also a member of the Church of Ireland, a champion of aristocratic virtues (particularly decrying bourgeois values and the uprooting cosmopolitanism of modernity) and at one point advocated a revitalised Irish people taking over the British Empire and renaming it the Anglo-Irish Empire.

O'Grady's influence crossed the divide of the Anglo-Irish and Irish-Ireland traditions in literature. His influence was explicitly stated by the Abbey Theatre set with Lady Gregory, W. B. Yeats and George William Russell attributing their interest in the Fenian Cycle of Gaelic tradition in part to him. Yeats is quoted on the influence of Standish: "he started us all". Some of the figures associated with the political party Sinn Féin, including its founder Arthur Griffith, had positive things to say about his efforts in helping to retrieve from the past the Gaelic heroic outlook.

== Family ==
His father was the Reverend Thomas O'Grady, the scholarly Church of Ireland minister of Castletown Berehaven, County Cork, and his mother Susanna Doe (or Dowe). Standish O'Grady's childhood home – the Glebe – lies a mile west of Castletownbere near a famine mass grave and ruined Roman Catholic chapel. He was a cousin of Standish Hayes O'Grady, another noted figure in Celtic literature, and of Standish O'Grady, 1st Viscount Guillamore.

He married Margaret Allen Fisher, daughter of William Allen Fisher and had three sons. Advised to move away from Ireland for the sake of his health, he passed his later years living with his eldest son, a clergyman in England, and died on the Isle of Wight.

His eldest son, Hugh Art O'Grady, was for a time editor of the Cork Free Press before he enlisted in the Great War early in 1915. He became better known as Dr Hugh O'Grady, later Professor of the Transvaal University College, Pretoria (later the University of Pretoria), who wrote the biography of his father in 1929.

After a rather severe education at Tipperary Grammar School, Standish James O'Grady followed his father to Trinity College, Dublin, where he won several prize medals and distinguished himself in several sports.

== Career ==
He proved too unconventional of mind to settle into a career in the church, and took a job as a schoolmaster at Midleton College, then in a period of expansion. He also qualified as a barrister, while earning much of his living by writing for the Irish newspapers. Reading Sylvester O'Halloran's "General history of Ireland" sparked an interest in early Irish history. After an initial lukewarm response to his writing on the legendary past in "History of Ireland: Heroic Period" (1878–81) and "Early Bardic Literature of Ireland" (1879), he realised that the public wanted romance, and so followed the example of James Macpherson in recasting Irish legends in literary form, producing historical novels including "Finn and his Companions" (1891), "The Coming of Cuculain" (1894), "The Chain of Gold" (1895), "Ulrick the Ready" (1896) and "The Flight of the Eagle" (1897), and "The Departure of Dermot" (1913).

He also studied Irish history of the Elizabethan period, presenting in his edition of Sir Thomas Stafford's "Pacata Hibernia" (1896) the view that the Irish people had made the Tudors into kings of Ireland to overthrow their unpopular landlords, the Irish chieftains. His "The Story of Ireland" (1894) was not well received, as it shed too positive a light on the rule of Oliver Cromwell for the taste of many Irish readers. He was also active in social and political campaigns in connection with such issues as unemployment and taxation.

Until 1898, he worked as a journalist for the Daily Express of Dublin, but in that year, finding Dublin journalism in decline, he moved to Kilkenny to become editor of the Kilkenny Moderator, which was printed at number 28 High Street. It was here he became involved with Ellen Cuffe, Countess of Desart and Captain Otway Cuffe. He engaged in the revival of the local woollen and woodworking industries. In 1900 he founded the All-Ireland Review, and returned to Dublin to manage it until it ceased publication in 1908. O'Grady contributed to James Larkins' The Irish Worker paper.

O'Grady's works were an influence on W. B. Yeats and George Russell and this led to him being known as the "Father of the Celtic Revival". Being as much proud of his family's Unionism and Protestantism as of his Gaelic Irish ancestry – identities that were increasingly seen as antithetical in the late 1800s – he was described by Augusta, Lady Gregory as a "fenian unionist".

== Published works ==
- The Emigrant: A Poem in Four Cantos (1842)
- History of Ireland: The Heroic Period (Vol.1, 1878 and Vol.2, 1880)
- Early Bardic Literature of Ireland (1879)
- History of Ireland: Cuculain and His Contemporaries (1880)
- Toryism and the Tory Democracy (1886)
- Red Hugh's Captivity: A Picture of Ireland, Social and Political, in the Reign of Queen Elizabeth (1889)
- Finn and his Companions (1891)
- The Bog of the Stars (1893)
- Lost On Du-Corrig Or Twixt Earth And Ocean (1894)
- The Coming of Cuculain (1894)
- The Chain of Gold (1895)
- In the Wake of King James, Or, Dun-Randal on the Sea (1896)
- Ulrick the Ready (1896)
- The Flight of the Eagle (1897)
- All Ireland (1898)
- Hugh Roe O'Donnell: A Sixteenth Century Irish Historical Play (1902)
- The Departure of Dermot (1913)
- Sun and Wind (1928)

== See also ==
- Gaelic League
- Douglas Hyde
