= Otway Cuffe =

Mayor of Kilkenny

Captain the Honourable Otway Frederick Seymour Cuffe
- Born: 11 January 1853; London,
- Died: 3 January 1912; Fremantle, Australia
- Spouse: Elizabeth St. Aubyn

Captain Otway Cuffe (11 January 1853 – 3 January 1912) was twice mayor of Kilkenny and a notable person in Kilkenny, founding businesses and organisations to profit the local people.

== Background ==
Born the Honourable Otway Frederick Seymour Cuffe to John Cuffe, 3rd Earl of Desart, and Lady Elizabeth Lucy Campbell. He had an older sister and two older brothers. The second eldest of his brothers, Hamilton, succeeded the eldest, William as Earl of Desart. As the 5th Earl had no male heirs himself, Cuffe was nominally his heir. However, as Cuffe also died without heirs, when the 5th Earl died the line became extinct.

== Family ==
Cuffe married Elizabeth St. Aubyn on 22 July 1891. She was the daughter of John St. Aubyn, 1st Baron St. Levan of St. Michaels Mount and Lady Elizabeth Clementina Townshend. When he became the heir to the Kilkenny-based title he moved to Ireland and lived nearby the main house, in Sheestown Lodge, Kilkenny, County Kilkenny. Cuffe had been in the Army. He had been Aide-de-camp to the Duke of Connaught for 1880–81. He was Groom of the Privy Chamber to Queen Victoria from 1893 to her death in 1901 and Gentleman Usher to both King Edward VII from 1901 until his death in 1910 and King George V until 1911. His rank in the army was Captain in the Rifle Brigade.

== Activities ==
Dedicated to ensuring a strong Irish identity in the area Cuffe worked with his sister-in-law Lady Desart. He joined the Gaelic League soon after his arrival in Kilkenny. He was elected president of its Kilkenny branch in 1904 and remained so until his death. He was replaced by Lady Desart. Together they opened the theatre in Kilkenny in 1902 and Cuffe was the first President of the Kilkenny Drama Club. Cuffe would also perform on stage.

He was first elected Mayor of Kilkenny in 1907 and again in 1908. With Lady Desart he built the Kilkenny Woollen Mills, Desart Hall, the Talbot's Inch model village and the Kilkenny Woodworkers factory. He laid the foundation stone for Kilkenny's Carnegie library. He was also President of the Irish Industrial Association

Cuffe was a friend of William Morris whom he had met on a trip to Iceland. He believed in the Arts and Crafts movement and tried to implement it in the projects which he drove. He was also a friend and supporter of Standish James O'Grady and helped him found the weekly radical conservative paper The All-Ireland Review and run it between 1900 and 1906.

In 1911 he became ill and was forced to move to warmer climates until he recovered. He decided to go to the south of Europe but then a visit to Australia seemed appropriate. However, on the journey there he became ill and died. He was buried in Fremantle where he died.
