= William Greene (MP) =

British politician

William Greene (17 January 1748 – 3 June 1829) was an Anglo-Irish parliamentarian and public official. He was a member of the second Parliament of the United Kingdom after the Act of Union 1801, representing the constituency of Dungarvan from 1802 to 1806.

Greene was the fourth son of John Greene of Greenville townland, County Kilkenny, and his wife the former Frances Nicholson. He was commissioned as a cadet in the East India Company's Bengal Army in 1769, and promoted lieutenant in 1772, captain in 1779, and major in 1785. He then returned to Ireland and invested in land in counties Kilkenny and Waterford. In 1789, he married Jane Massy, the daughter of Hugh Massy, 2nd Baron Massy. They had four sons and four daughters. Some of their descendants used the surname Massy Greene or Massy-Greene.

With the patronage of George Beresford, 1st Marquess of Waterford, Greene followed his oldest brother Godfrey Greene into politics – he had represented Dungarvan in the Parliament of Ireland. William held the Dungarvan seat from the 1802 general election until the dissolution of parliament in October 1806, as a Whig. He did not stand for re-election. According to an agent of William Cavendish, 5th Duke of Devonshire, a political opponent, he was "extremely unpopular in the town, from his being an harsh landlord, and from his having been long in India he has contracted some very arbitrary habits". In 1823, Greene was chosen as High Sheriff of County Kilkenny.

== See also ==
- Members of the 3rd UK Parliament from Ireland

Parliament of the United Kingdom
Preceded by Edward Lee	Member of Parliament for Dungarvan; 1802–1806	Succeeded by George Walpole
Honorary titles
Preceded by William Tighe	High Sheriff of County Kilkenny; 1823	Succeeded by William Ponsonby
