= Val d'Orcia =

Region of Tuscany, Italy

UNESCO World Heritage Site
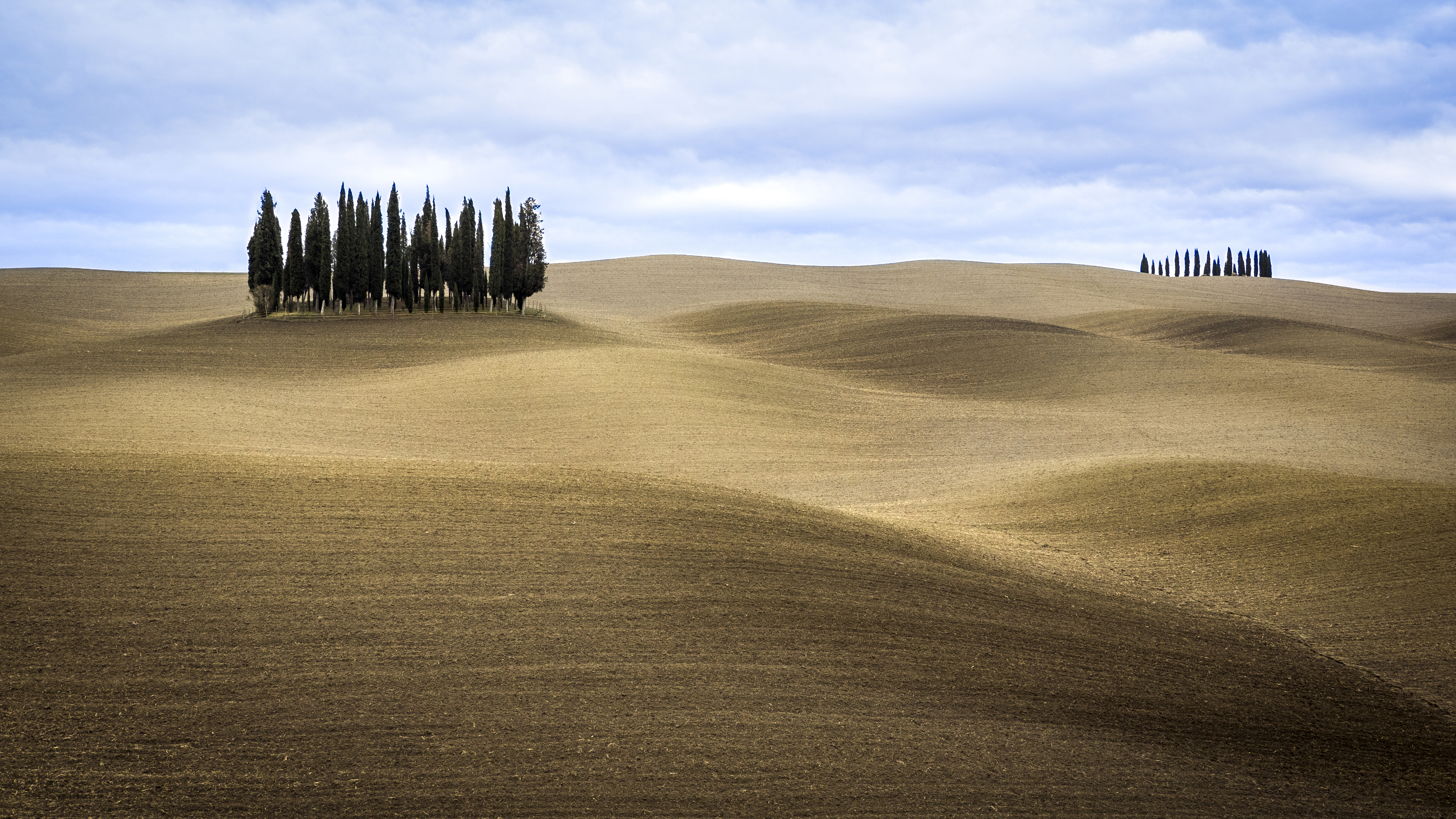
- Typical landscape of the Val d'Orcia

- Location within Tuscany Location within Italy
- Location: Provinces of Siena and Grosseto, Tuscany, Italy
- Criteria: Cultural: (iv), (vi)
- Reference: 1026rev
- Inscription: 2004 (28th Session)
- Area: 61,188 ha (151,200 acres)
- Buffer zone: 5,660 ha (14,000 acres)
- Website: www.parcodellavaldorcia.com/en/
- Coordinates: 43°04′N 11°33′E

The Val d'Orcia or Valdorcia (Italian: [valˈdortʃa]) is a region of Tuscany, Central Italy, which extends from the hills south of Siena to Monte Amiata, between the provinces of Siena and Grosseto. Its gentle, cultivated hills are occasionally broken by gullies and by towns and villages such as Pienza (rebuilt as an "ideal town" in the 15th century under the patronage of Pope Pius II), Radicofani (home to the notorious brigand-hero Ghino di Tacco) and Montalcino (the Brunello di Montalcino is counted among the most prestigious of Italian wines). Its landscape has been depicted in works of art from Renaissance painting to modern photography.

== World Heritage ==
The Val d'Orcia was added to the UNESCO list of World Heritage Sites in 2004.

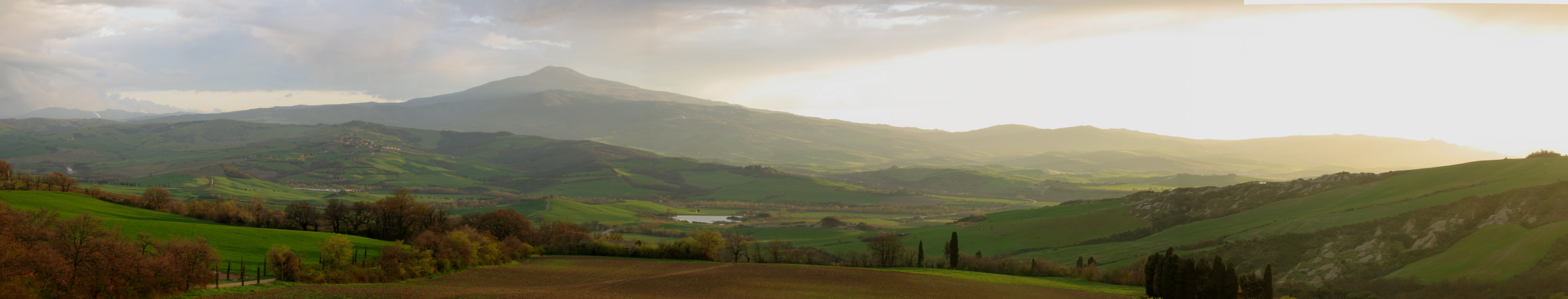
Val d'Orcia with Monte Amiata, view to the west from La Foce

== Orcia DOC ==
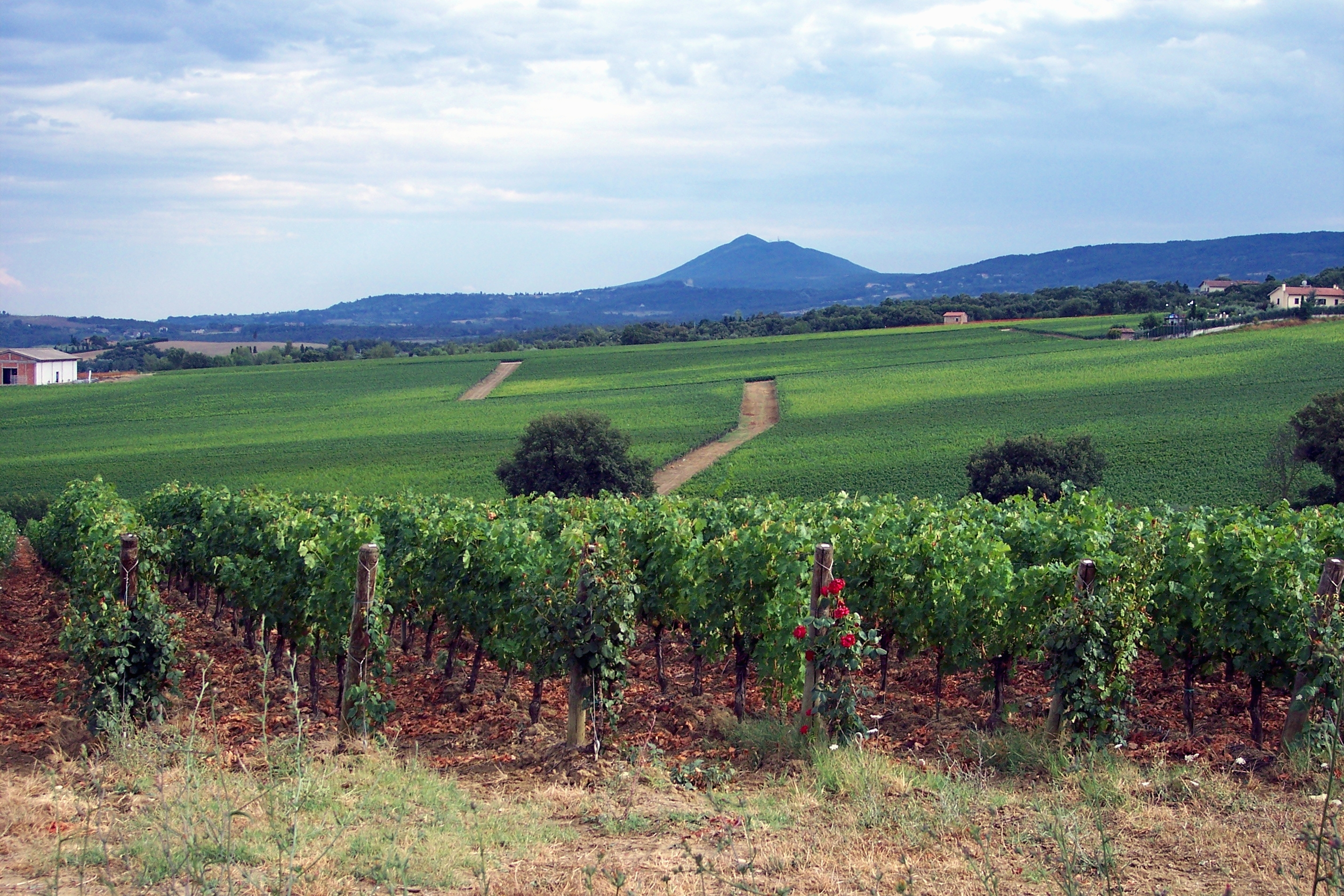
Sangiovese vineyards in the Val D'Orcia, Monte Amiata in the background.

Within the Val d'Orcia is a strip of land following the Orcia river between the DOCG zones of Brunello di Montalcino and Vino Nobile di Montepulciano. Here Sangiovese and Trebbiano-based wines are produced under the Orcia Denominazione di origine controllata (DOC) status.

The DOC red wine is composed of at least 60 per cent Sangiovese with other local varieties, such as Abrusco, permitted to fill in the remainder of the blend. The dry white wine and Vin Santo style DOC wines are composed of at least 50 per cent Trebbiano filled out with other local varieties. All grapes destined for DOC wine production are limited to a maximum harvest yield of 10 tonnes/hectare, with the finished wines required to have a minimum alcohol level of at least 12 per cent.

== Historic railways heritage site ==
Val d'Orcia is crossed by a 19th-century railway, whose tracks, stations and tunnels are continually maintained in working order, the normal railway service provided by the state having been discontinued in 1994. The scenic line connects the small town of Asciano with Monte Antico using historic steam engines and carriages on selected dates throughout the year, to serve visitors to local festivals.

== Film locations ==
Val d'Orcia has been a location for many well-known films, including:

- 8½ by Federico Fellini (1963)
- Brother Sun, Sister Moon by Franco Zeffirelli (1972)
- Nostalghia by Andrei Tarkovsky (1983)
- The English Patient by Anthony Minghella (1996)
- Stealing Beauty by Bernardo Bertolucci (1996)
- A Midsummer Night's Dream by Michael Hoffman (1999)
- Gladiator by Ridley Scott (2000)

== In popular culture ==
=== Literature ===
The book War in Val d'Orcia by Iris Origo (1902–1988) is a detailed, first-hand account of the World War II events of 1943–1944 in the region, written as a diary in English.

=== Film and drama ===
Netflix series Can This Love Be Translated? which follows the romance between interpreter Joo Ho-jin and actress Cha Mu-hee, was filmed collaboration with the Tuscany Film Commission. The crew spent a week across Tuscany through December 4, utilizing Montalcino's stone streets and scenic viewpoints overlooking the Val d'Orcia

== Gallery ==
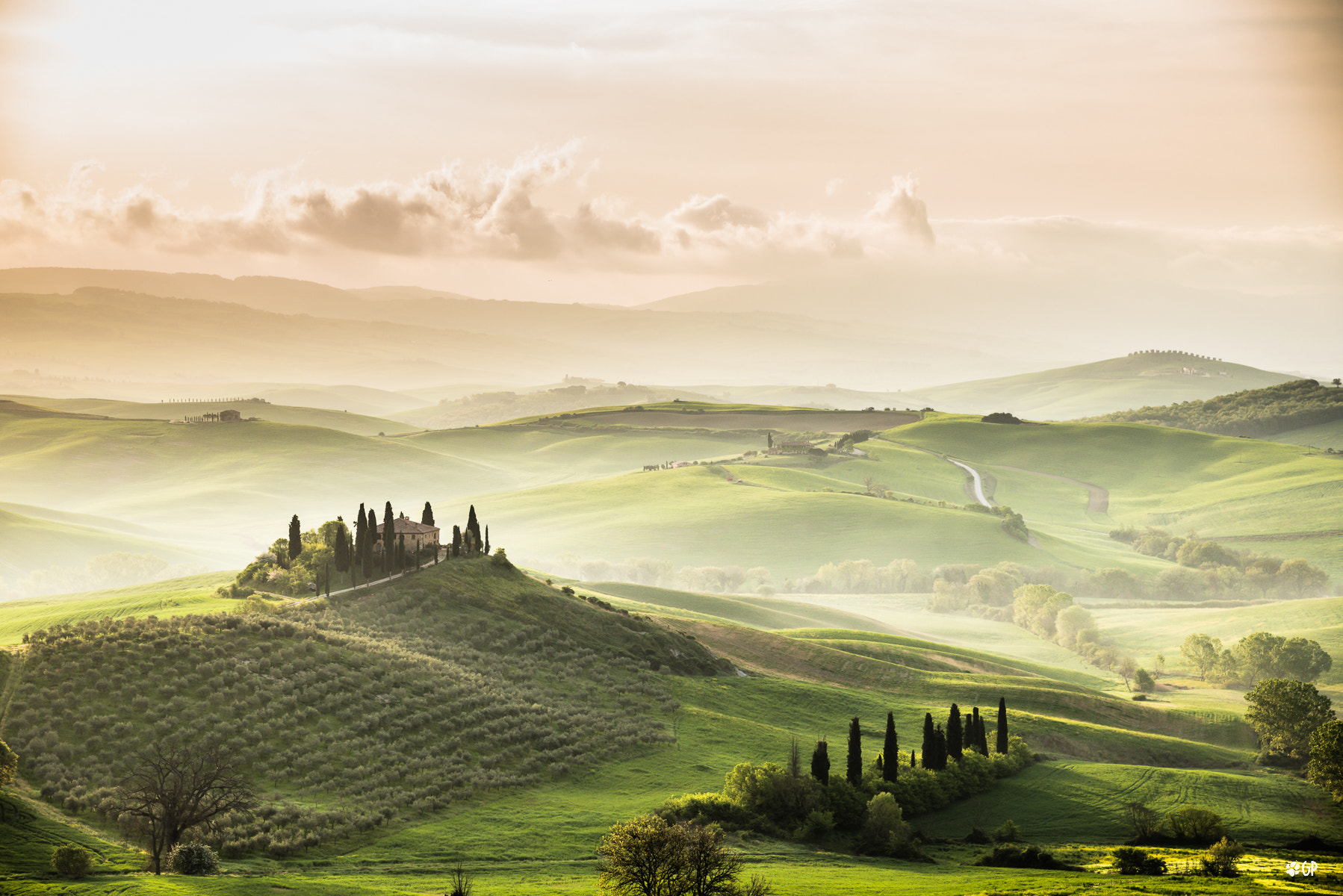

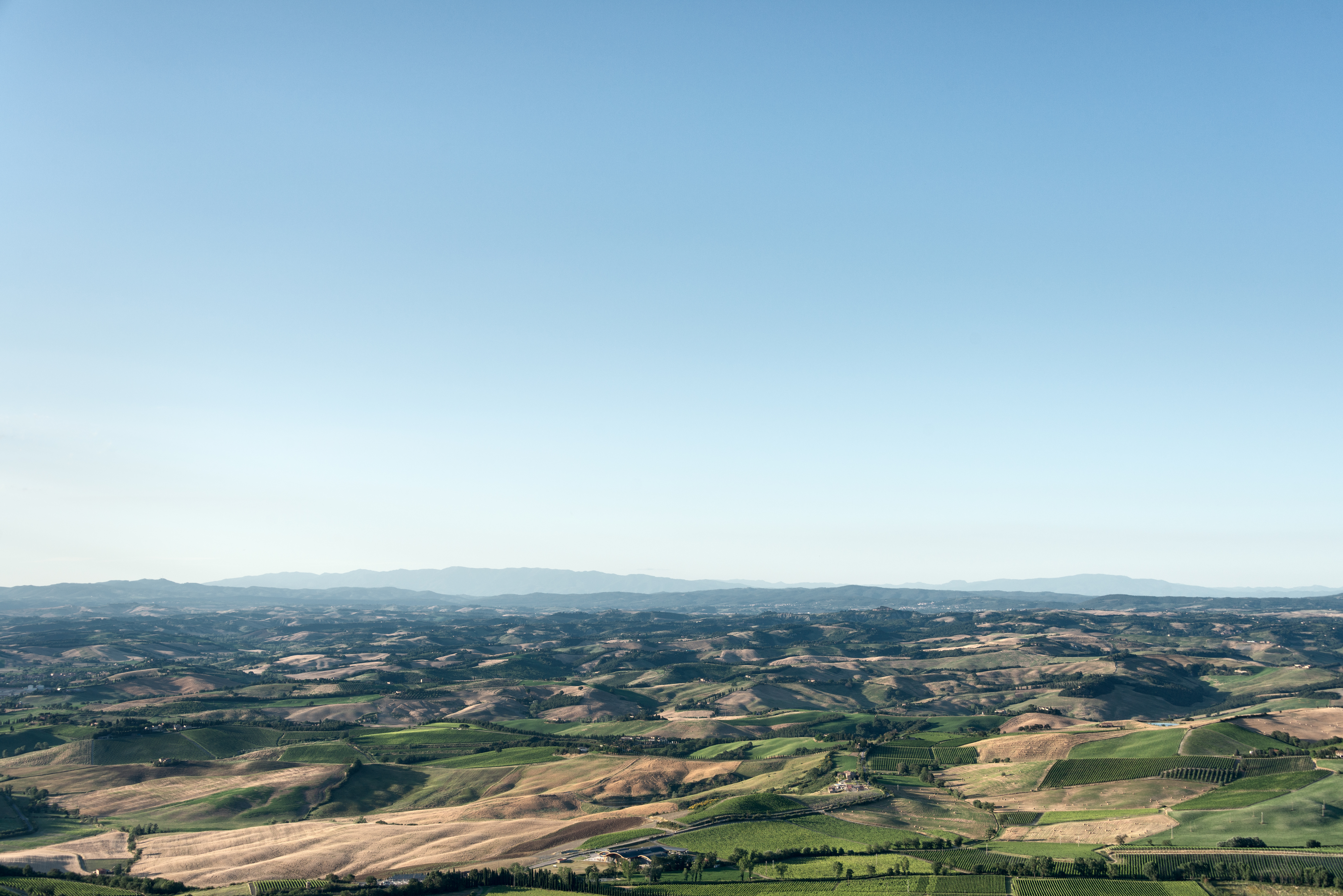

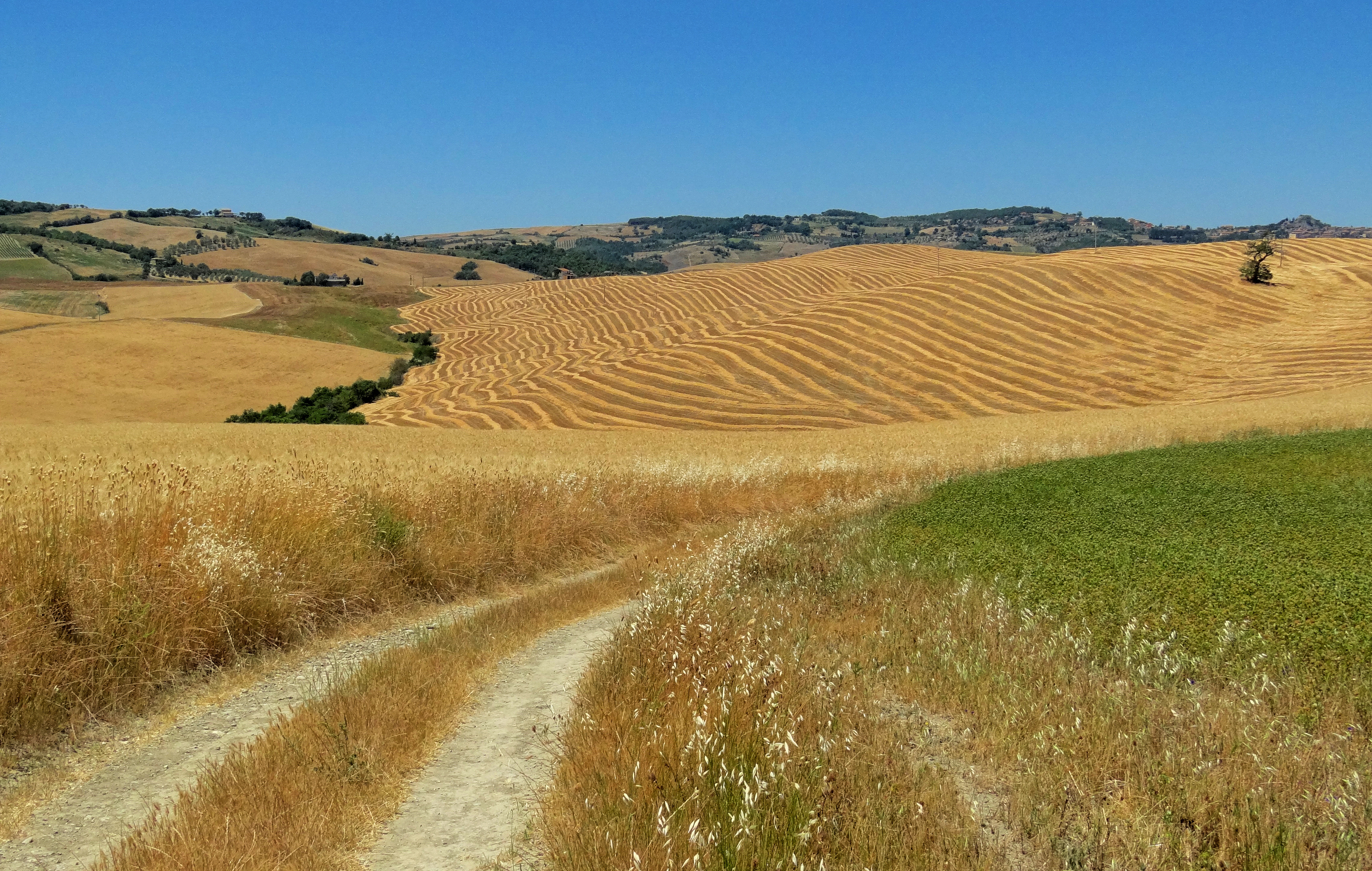

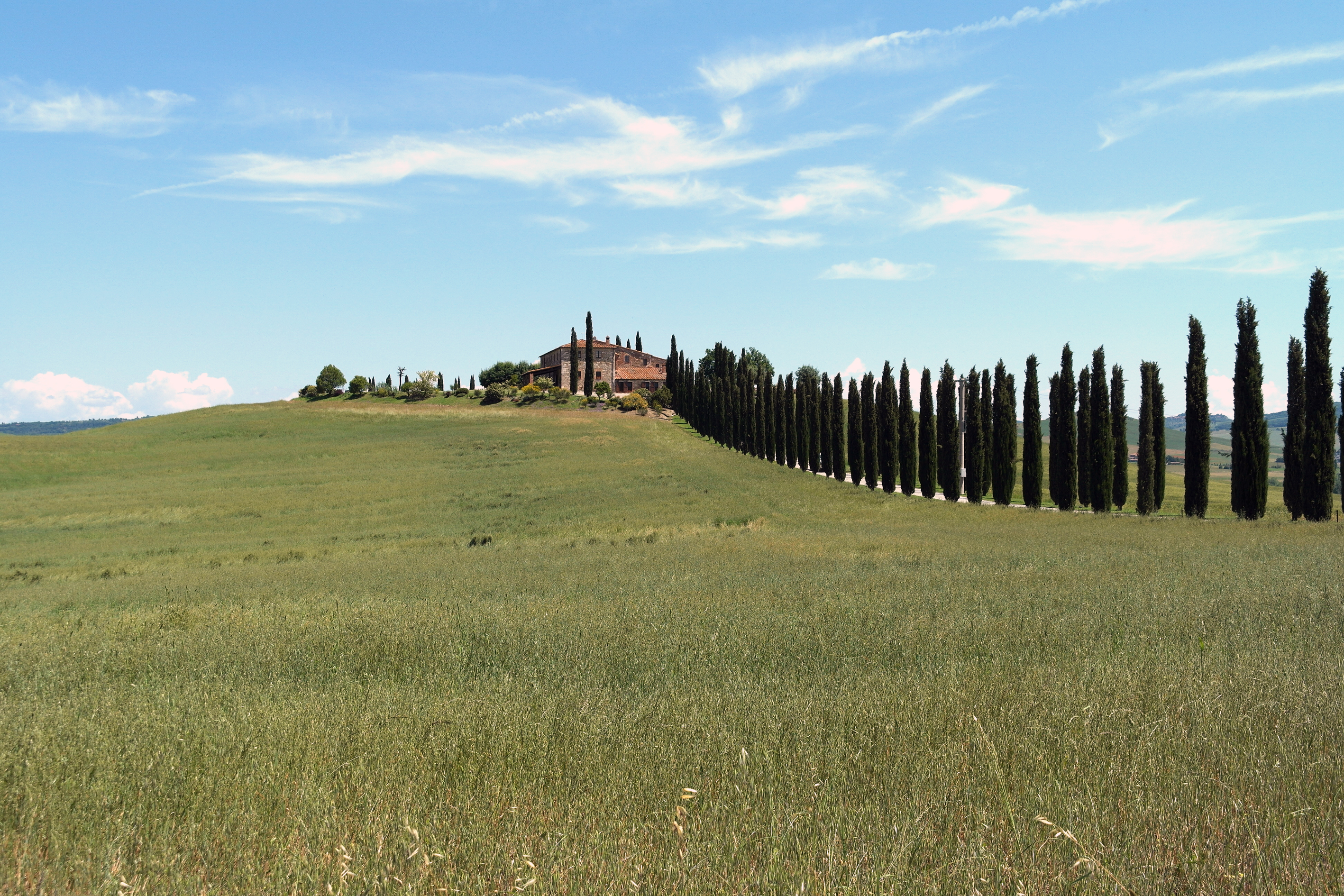

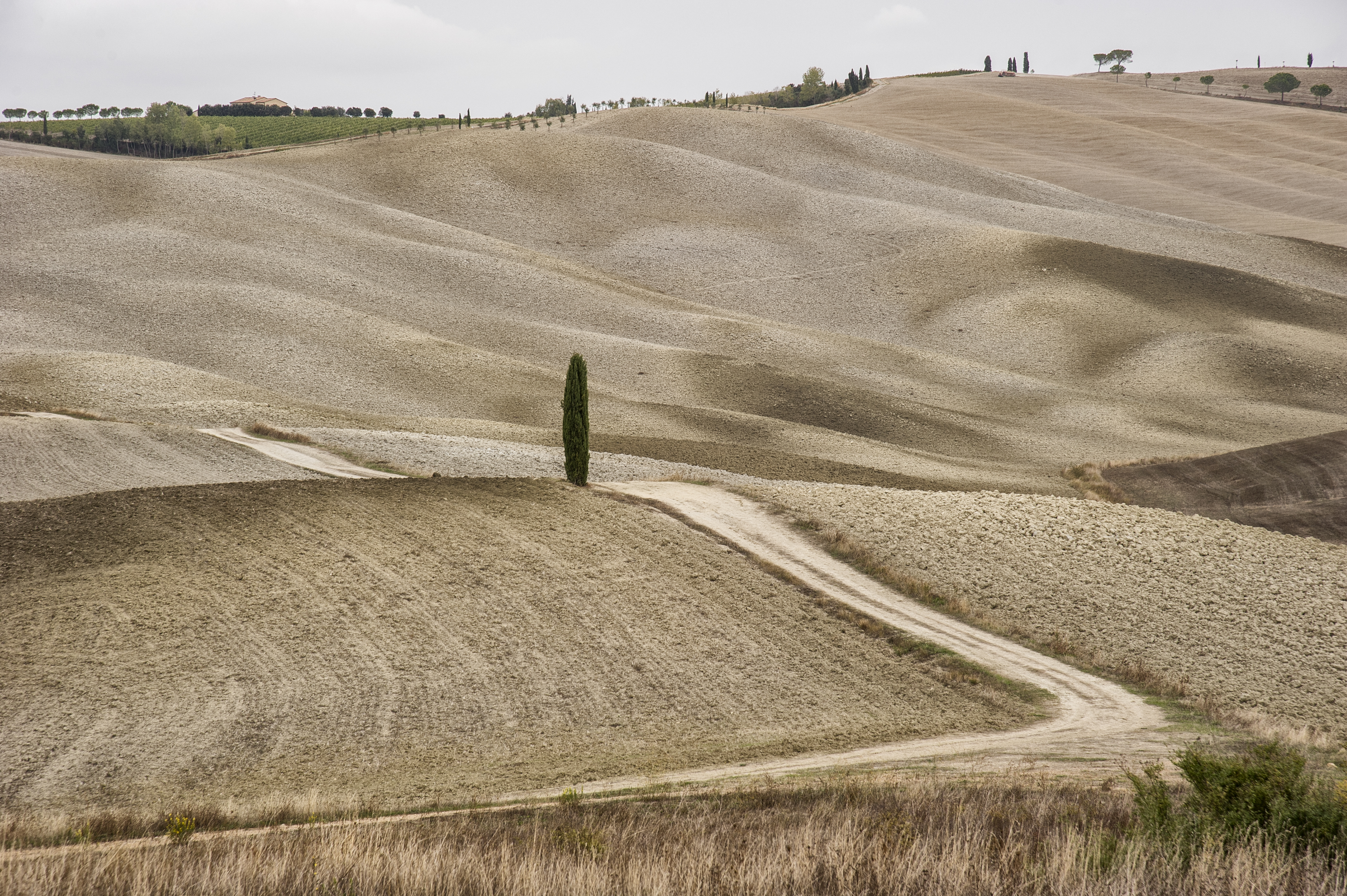

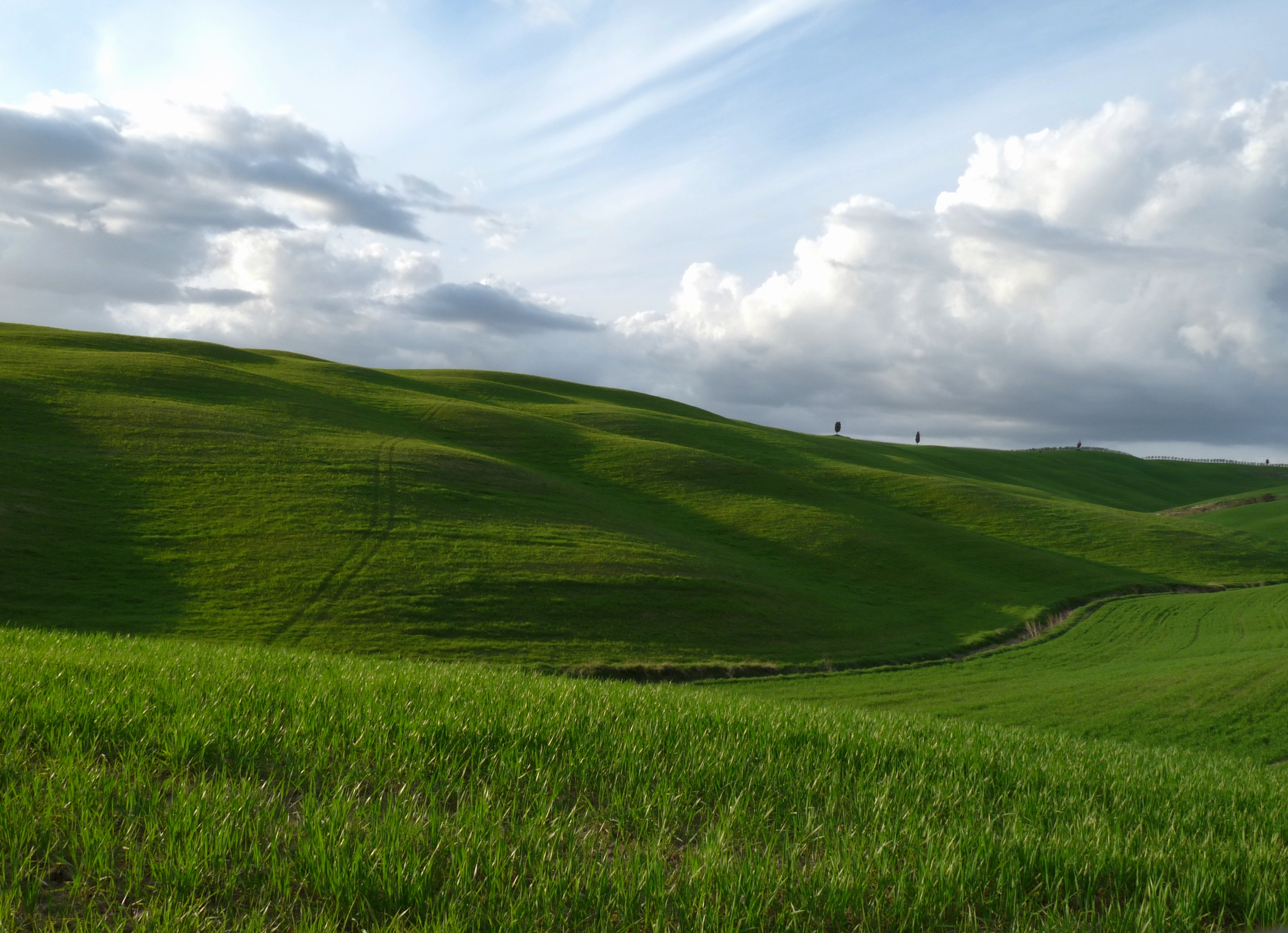

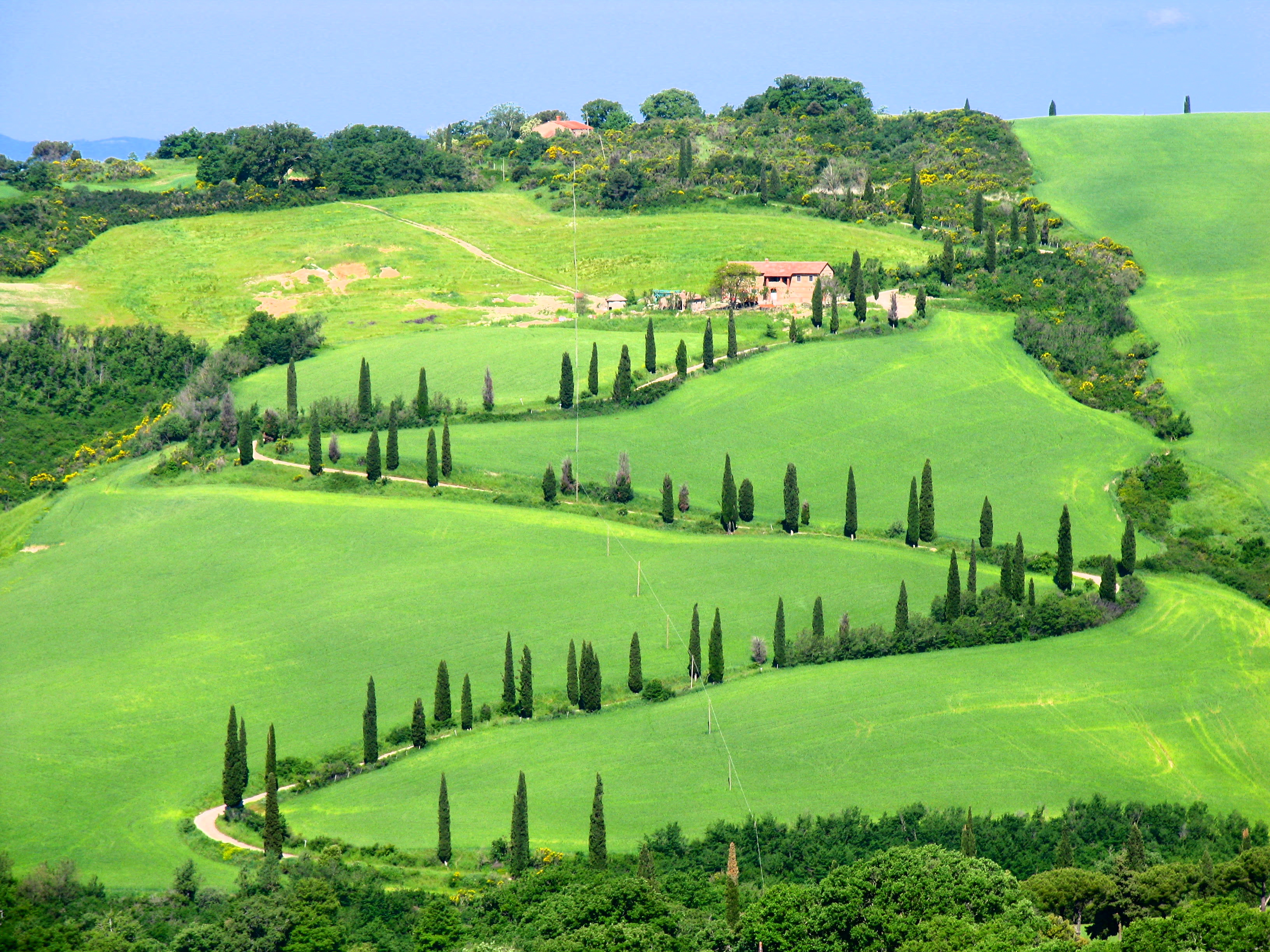

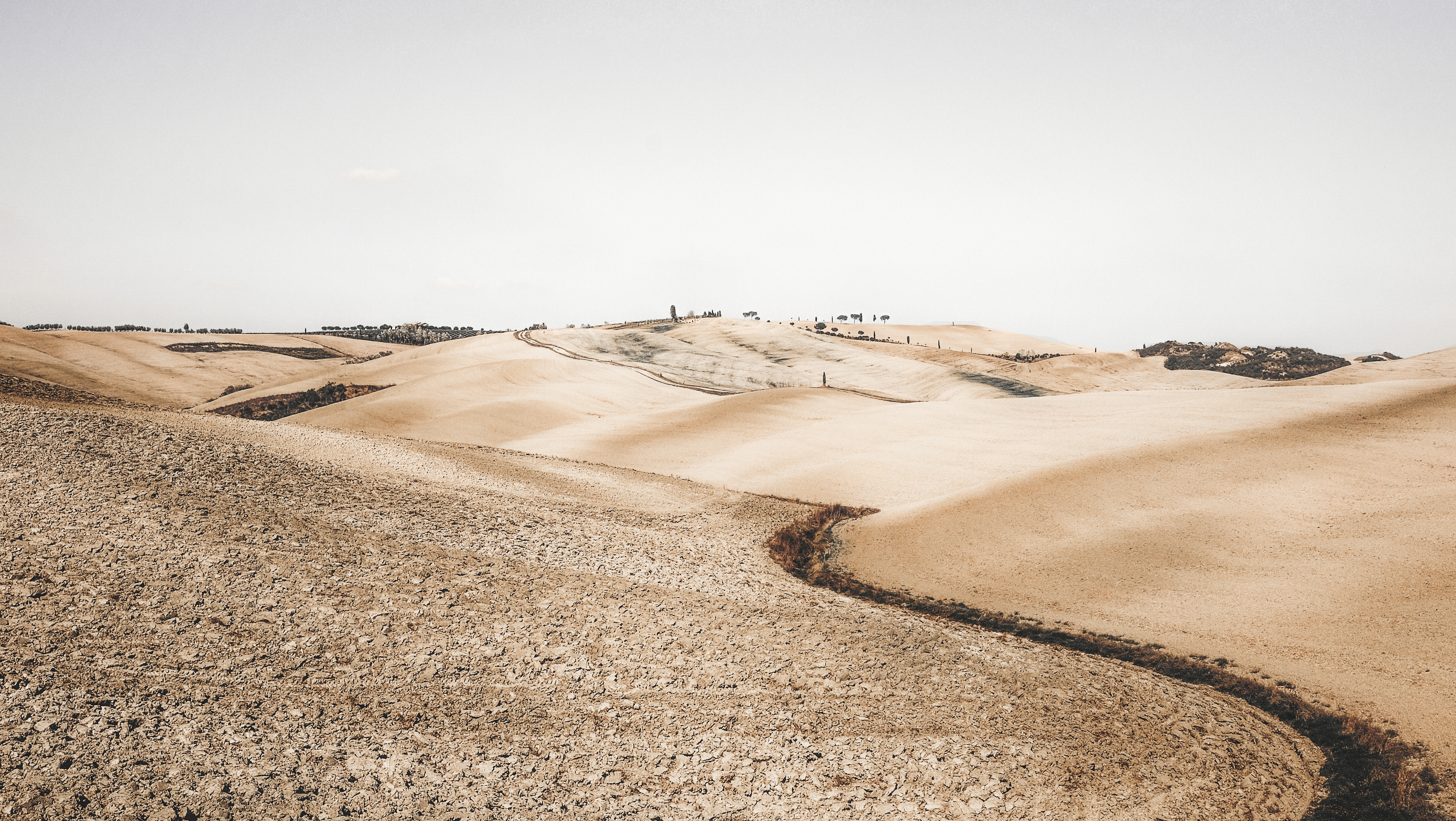

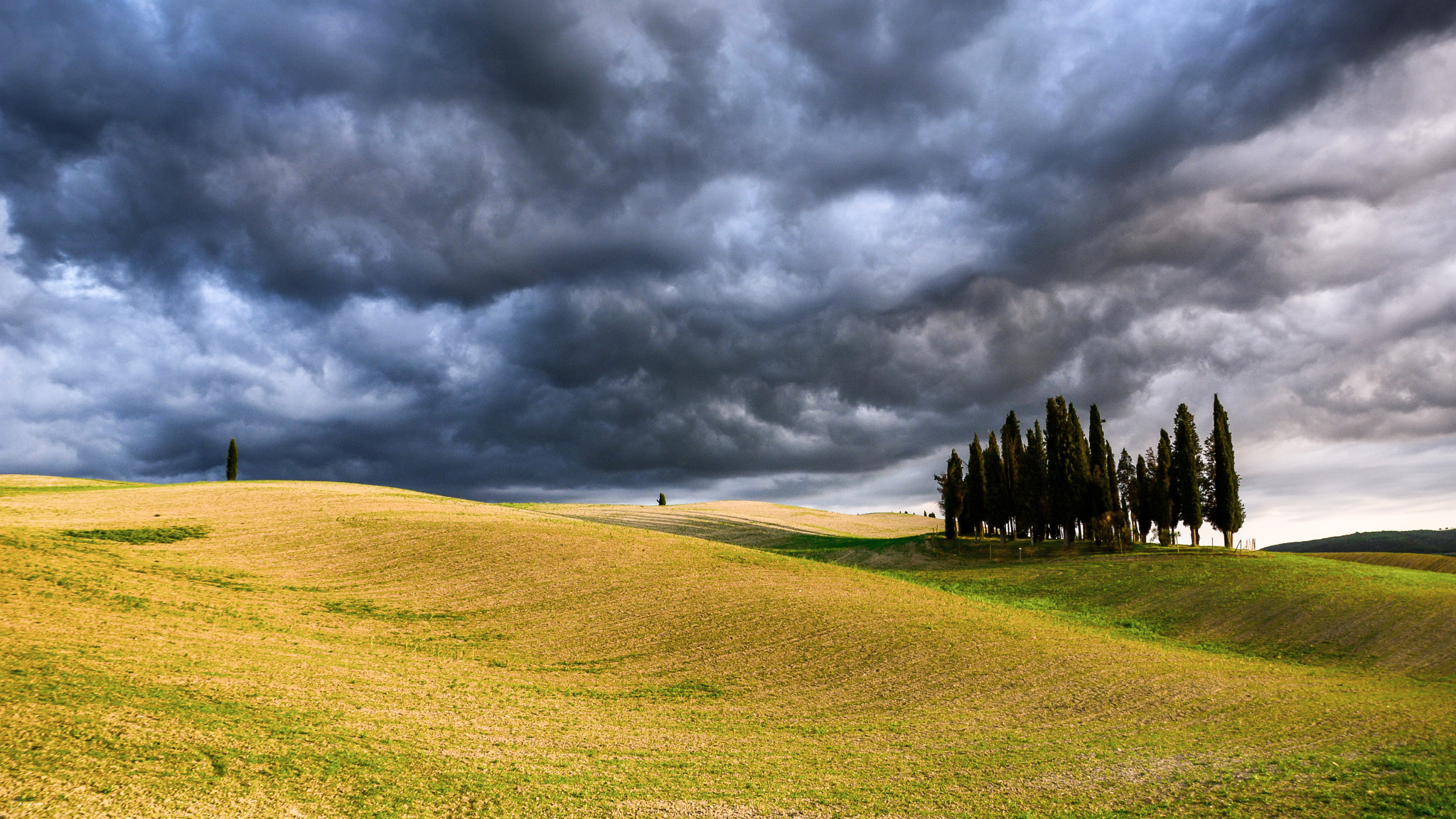
