= Earl of Desart =

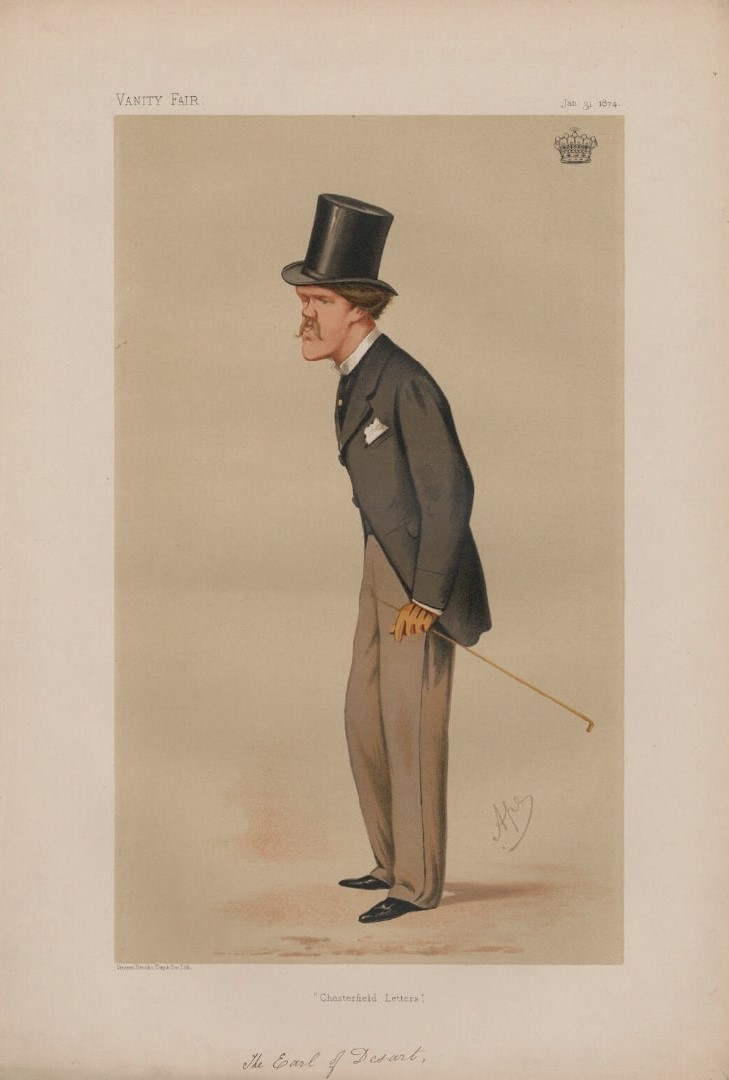
4th Earl caricatured by Ape for Vanity Fair, 1874

Earl of Desart was a title in the Peerage of Ireland. It was created in 1793 for Otway Cuffe, 1st Viscount Desart. He had already succeeded his elder brother as third Baron Desart in 1767 and been created Viscount Desart, in the County of Kilkenny, in the Peerage of Ireland in 1781. He was also made Viscount Castlecuffe in the Peerage of Ireland at the same time as he was granted the earldom. He later sat in the House of Lords between 1800 and 1804 as one of the 28 original Irish representative peer. Lord Desart was the younger son of John Cuffe, who represented Thomastown in the Irish House of Commons between 1715 and 1727. In 1733 he was raised to the Peerage of Ireland as Baron Desart, in the County of Kilkenny.

The first Earl was succeeded by his son, the second Earl. He sat as Member of Parliament for Bossiney between 1809 and 1817. On his early death the titles passed to his son, the third Earl. He served as Under-Secretary of State for War and the Colonies between March and December 1852 in the Earl of Derby's first administration. His younger son, the fifth Earl (who succeeded his elder brother in 1898, was a prominent lawyer and notably served as Queen's Proctor between 1894 and 1909 and as Director of Public Prosecutions between 1894 and 1908. In 1909 he was created Baron Desart, of Desart in the County of Kilkenny, in the Peerage of the United Kingdom. Lord Desart had no sons and on his death in 1934 all his titles became extinct. His daughter Lady Sybil Cuffe was the mother of the writer Iris Origo through her first husband William Bayard Cutting Jr., an American with Dutch and Huguenot ancestry who was the secretary to the U.S. embassy to the Court of St. James's and whose father was a successful American merchant.

The family seat was Desart Court, County Kilkenny, in the Republic of Ireland. The manor house itself was burnt down in the early 1920s as a result of an IRA attack.

== Barons Desart (1733) ==
- John Cuffe, 1st Baron Desart (died 1749)
- John Cuffe, 2nd Baron Desart (1730–1767)
- Otway Cuffe, 3rd Baron Desart (1737–1804) (created Viscount Desart in 1781 and Earl of Desart in 1793)

== Earls of Desart (1793) ==
- Otway Cuffe, 1st Earl of Desart (1737–1804)
- John Otway Cuffe, 2nd Earl of Desart (1788–1820)
- John Otway O'Connor Cuffe, 3rd Earl of Desart (1818–1865)
- William Ulick O'Connor Cuffe, 4th Earl of Desart (1845–1898)
- Hamilton John Agmondesham Cuffe, 5th Earl of Desart (1848–1934)
