= William Tighe =

Lord Lieutenant of Kilkenny from 1847 to 1878

William Frederick Fownes Tighe (17 March 1794 - 11 June 1878), PC, JP was Lord Lieutenant of Kilkenny from 1847 to 1878.

He was educated at Trinity College Dublin. He married Lady Louisa Maddelena Lennox, daughter of General Charles Lennox, 4th Duke of Richmond and Lady Charlotte Gordon, on 18 April 1825. They lived at Woodstock. County Kilkenny.

He died on 11 June 1878.

Honorary titles
Preceded by John Ponsonby, 4th Earl of Bessborough	Lord Lieutenant of Kilkenny; 1878–1919	Succeeded by James Butler, 3rd Marquess of Ormonde
