= War in Val d'Orcia =

Memoir of World War II by Iris Origo

War in Val d'Orcia is a civilian Second World War memoir in diary form, set in Tuscany. The author was the Anglo-Irish writer and philanthropist Iris Origo.

== Setting ==
Origo, with her Italian husband Antonio, a nobleman, owned and managed the estate of La Foce, covering 57 farms on some 7000 acres (c. 2833 ha). The early parts of the book recount events in Italy from the end of January 1943 as seen and heard from the author's locality in rural Tuscany. The account begins with the arrival of the first refugee children, sent by parents with local links, in response to the Allied bombing of cities, particularly Genoa and Turin. Detailed information is given on the opinions and allegiances of local people and officials. "The intention, presumably of the raids was to produce panic: the immediate result was rather resentment. Partly of the kind that the Allies wished to produce, resentment against Fascism.... But there was also... a healthy, elemental reaction of resentment against those who were dropping the bombs."

The overthrow of Mussolini on 24 July 1943 was followed by a short chaotic period of "Fascist Republican" rule under the Italian Social Republic, whose actions were progressively superseded by the weight of German occupation and military reinforcements from Germany. Public desires for a separate peace were tempered by feelings of shame at the idea of capitulation. The couple's tasks were complicated by having some 50 British prisoners of war billeted on them, in addition to over 20 child evacuees, many other outlawed people, partisans, and others who had fallen foul of the Fascists and/or the German occupiers at various times. Meanwhile Origo's second daughter was born on 9 June.

The events of those years and the feelings toward them in ordinary people are described in vivid detail. These include the deportation or arbitrary murder of the Jews of Italy.

== Allied advance ==
The Allied invasion of Sicily (9 July 1943 onwards) and the Italian mainland (from 3 September 1943) affected Val d'Orcia through the Allied bombings of major cities elsewhere, the increasing partisan activities, and the reprisals made by the Republican Fascists and the occupying Germans. Many of the prisoners of war at La Foce set out to join the Allied forces, in a few cases successfully. They were more than replaced by new arrivals: "Indeed, our woods [round La Foce] seem likely to be thickly populated this autumn, sheltering not only Italian soldiers [evading re-enlistment], but an ever-increasing number of Allied escaped prisoners..." Allied advance was felt to be painfully slow: "The B.B.C. exhorts its listeners in England to be patient – but this is less easy for those living here, who are still enduring Allied bombings, as well as increasingly severe German and Fascist repressive measures." "Allied progress imperceptible." "Daily the B.B.C. tells of 'four miles' progress, two miles' progress'; it seems infinitesimal. The B.B.C. reports, too, with satisfaction, the results of the Moscow Conference, but here it seems very remote indeed.... Everywhere the screw is being tightened."

Origo is critical also of the way the Allied air attacks were conducted: "Such incidents [as the bombing of a trainload of Allied prisoners and civilians evacuated from Rome] ... are part of war. But the bombing of a little town like Arezzo, including the districts farthest away from the railway – and of country churches, like the Convento dell'Osservanza outside Siena – these, and the machine-gunning of the civilian population, cannot easily be explained. It is difficult to believe that public opinion in England, if fully informed, would approve of all this." She notes also the variant Italian and Allied accounts of air attacks: "the pot calling the kettle black."

Later German personnel and equipment were also billeted on them. Personal possessions and food stocks had to be concealed. A further, more detailed account of the deep divisions in Italian opinion appears in the 15 October entry, but Origo adds that "the great mass of the Italian people... hold none of these extreme opinions – but tira a campare (just rubs along)." On 17 November she notes, "Daily the procession continues of the fugitives, the homeless, the old and the hungry. Today... I interviewed... (1) Three fugitive Italian soldiers ... (2) Two other fugitives, Italian airmen from Albania .... We find a place for them on one of our farms. (3) Four of the British POWs from our own camp who (unknown to us) have been living all this time in a cave not far from here, fed by the farmers. (4) More families of evacuees .... (5) A destitute old woman from Chianciano, with five small grandchildren .... And so it goes on – an unending stream of human suffering."

After several false alarms, Origo and her family and those dependent on them were forced to leave La Foce, as battle between the Germans and the Allies for control of the district heated up. The account of the flight with the evacuee children is a chilling one, but largely successful. The house survived but not its contents. "Destruction and death have visited us, but now – there is hope in the air."

== Reception ==
The New York Times called Origo's book "a remarkably moving document that, like the best of the elemental war stories, eventually becomes a statement about the unplanned nature and folly of war." Dr Rick Price, an American reader, commented in 2010: "Iris Origo is remarkable for the ease with which she documents, almost daily, the progress of the war in Italy through her diary." The New Yorker is quoted as saying, "War in Val D'Orcia is the simple, day-to-day record of the terrible years 1943–44 in Italy, set down by a woman who was always too busy, she noted, to remember to feel afraid."

== Editions ==
Originally published by Jonathan Cape, London (1947), the book was reissued in The Travellers Library (Cape, 1951) and by Penguin UK (1956); John Murray (1984); David R. Godine, Boston USA (1984–2002); Century Hutchinson (1985); Allison & Busby, UK (1999); HarperCollins, Australia (2002); and The New York Review of Books, USA (2018). Page references here are to the 1951 edition.
