= Lord Lieutenant of Kilkenny =

Ceremonial officer in Kilkenny, Ireland

This is a list of people who have served as the Lord Lieutenant of Kilkenny.

There were lieutenants of counties in Ireland until the reign of James II, when they were renamed governors. The office of Lord Lieutenant was recreated on 23 August 1831.

== Governors ==
- James Butler, 2nd Duke of Ormond -1715 (attainted 1715)
- Christopher Wandesford, 2nd Viscount Castlecomer 1715–1719
- William Ponsonby, 2nd Earl of Bessborough
- Walter Butler, 1st Marquess of Ormonde –1820
- James Butler, 1st Marquess of Ormonde –1831

== Lord Lieutenants ==
- James Butler, 1st Marquess of Ormonde 7 October 1831 – 18 May 1838
- John Ponsonby, 4th Earl of Bessborough November 1838 – 16 May 1847
- William Frederick Fownes Tighe 25 June 1847 – 11 June 1878
- James Butler, 3rd Marquess of Ormonde 5 October 1878 – 26 October 1919
- Hamilton Cuffe, 5th Earl of Desart 23 June 1920 – 1922
