= William Cuffe, 4th Earl of Desart =

Irish earl and writer (1845–1898)

The Right Honourable The Earl of Desart
- Monarch: Victoria

Personal details
- Born: 10 July 1845
- Died: 15 September 1898
- Spouse(s): Maria Emma Georgina Preston; 1871-1878; Ellen Cuffe, Countess of Desart 1881-1898

William Ulick O'Connor Cuffe, 4th Earl of Desart (10 July 1845 – 15 September 1898). He succeeded to the title of 6th Baron Desart, 4th Viscount Desart and 4th Earl of Desart on 1 April 1865.

== Background ==
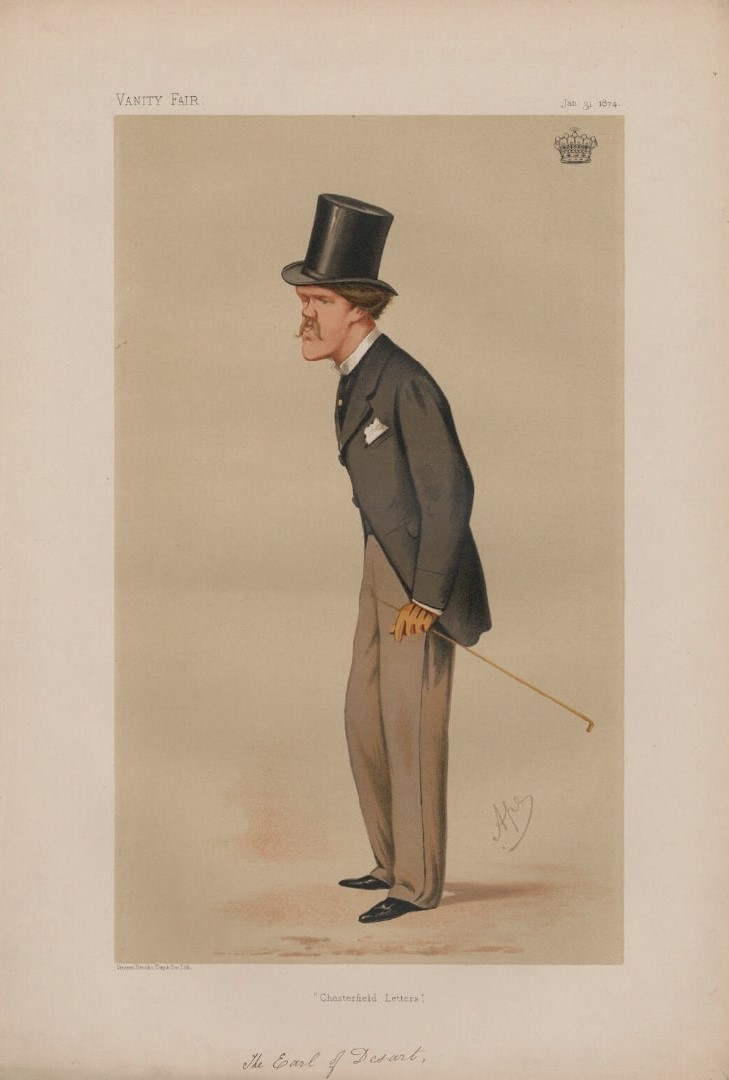
4th Earl caricatured by Ape for Vanity Fair, 1874

Desart was the son of John Cuffe, 3rd Earl of Desart, and Lady Elizabeth Lucy Campbell. He had an older sister and two younger brothers. One of his brothers, Hamilton, succeeded him as 5th Earl. The other, Captain Otway Cuffe went on to be mayor of Kilkenny and a notable person with the community.

== Activities ==
Desert was also a literary man who wrote fifteen novels during his life. His most successful works were mystery thrillers.

- Only a Woman's Love (1869), Herne Lodge (1888) and The Little Chatelaine (1889)
- Beyond These Voices (1870) was set against the background of the Fenian Rising.

Other titles included:

- Children of Nature: A Story of Modern London (1878)
- The Honourable Ella (1879)
- Lord and Lady Piccadilly (1887)
- Mervyn O'Connor and other tales (1880)
- Grandborough (1894)
- The raid of the "Detrimental" (1897)
- Kelverdale (1879)
- Helen's vow (1891)
- Love and pride on an iceberg and other tales (1887)

He owned a total of 9,000 acres in Kilkenny and Tipperary.

== Family ==
Lord Desart married Maria Emma Georgina Preston, daughter of Captain Thomas Henry Preston and Georgina Geneviève Louisa Campbell, on 1 June 1871. They had one daughter, Kathleen. They divorced in 1878.

He then married Ellen Cuffe, Countess of Desart, daughter of Henri Louis Bischoffsheim on 27 April 1881. Lord Desart died in 1898 at age 53 after a short illness on his yacht, and was succeeded in the earldom by his brother, Hamilton. The Countess of Desart went on to become a politician in her own right and died in June 1933, aged 75.

Peerage of Ireland
| Preceded by John Cuffe | Earl of Desart; 1865–1898 | Succeeded by Hamilton Cuffe |
