= Ellen Cuffe, Countess of Desart =

Irish politician and company director (1857–1933)

Ellen Cuffe
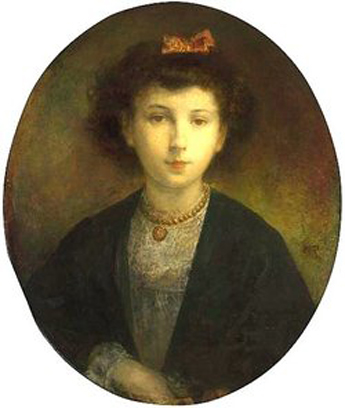
- Portrait of a young Ellen Cuffe
- Born: Ellen Odette Bischoffsheim; 1 September 1857; London, England
- Died: 29 June 1933 (aged 75); Waterloo Road, Dublin, Ireland
- Resting place: Falmouth, Cornwall, England
- Occupations: Irish politician; Company director; Philanthropist
- Known for: Philanthropy and Politics
- Notable work: Kilkenny Library; Aut Even Hospital; The Woollen Mills; Kilkenny Woodworkers; Kilkenny Theatre; Tobacco Growers Association; Desart Hall; Talbots Inch Village; Talbots Inch Suspension Bridge
- Title: Countess of Desart
- Movement: Gaelic League
- Spouse: William Cuffe (m. 1881)
- Father: Henri Louis Bischoffsheim

Senator
- In office 11 December 1922 – 29 June 1933

Personal details
- Party: Independent

Ellen Odette Cuffe, Countess of Desart (née Bischoffsheim; 1 September 1857 – 29 June 1933) was a London-born Jewish woman who was best known as an Irish politician, company director, Gaelicist and philanthropist in Ireland. She has been called '"the most important Jewish woman in Irish history".

== Family ==
She was the daughter of Henri Louis Bischoffsheim, a wealthy Jewish banker of German origin. He was responsible for founding three of the largest banks in the world: the Deutsche Bank, the Paribas Bank, and Société Générale. Her younger sister, Amélie Bischoffsheim, was married to Sir Maurice FitzGerald, 20th Knight of Kerry.

She married William Cuffe, the 4th Earl of Desart on 29 April 1881 at Christ Church in Down Street, Mayfair.

== Life in Ireland ==
=== Interest in Gaelic Revival ===
After the death of her husband Lady Desart left the house in Cuffesgrange and moved to her home in Aut Even (a transcription of Áit Aoibhinn, the Irish for Beautiful Place) on the outskirts of Kilkenny city. She was interested in the Gaelic revival of the time and became a member of the Gaelic League and was elected the president of the Kilkenny branch, succeeding her brother-in-law, Captain Otway Cuffe, who was mayor of Kilkenny.

She commissioned the village of Talbot's Inch to be built by the architect William Alphonsus Scott. along with several other projects she and Capt. Cuffe developed together. These included Kilkenny Library, Aut Even Hospital, the Woollen Mills, Kilkenny Woodworkers, Kilkenny Theatre, the Tobacco Growers Association, Desart Hall, and Talbots Inch Suspension Bridge.

In relation to her support of the Irish language, Lady Desart reminded the people that her own people, the Jews, had revived a forgotten language in Mandate Palestine and used it to re-unite the scattered remnants of their nation.

On 3 November 1910, Lady Desart formally opened the Carnegie Library for the very first time with a silver key supplied by P.T. Murphy, Jeweller, High St., Kilkenny.

=== Irish Free State politics ===
She was appointed to the Irish Free State Seanad Éireann as an independent member in December 1922 by the President of the Executive Council. She was one of four women elected or appointed to the first Seanad in 1922. She was the first Jew to serve as a Senator in Ireland. She was appointed for 12 years in 1922 and served until her death in 1933. Desart's rise to the role of one of the first women ever to serve in a political role in Ireland is somewhat ironic given that she had previously actually opposed women's suffrage: It was noted in her 1933 obituary that she had played an "energetic part" in opposing women having a place in politics, and believed that "women should not compete against men at work or play".

Lady Desart, as president of the Women's Committee from 1908 to 1933, was directly involved in the rescue of approximately 300,000 women and children. She is buried along with her Anglo-Irish husband William Cuffe (from Desart Cuffsgrange, County Kilkenny) in Falmouth, Cornwall. The tombstone reads "They were together in their lives, and in their deaths they shall not be divided". She died on 29 June 1933 at Waterloo Rd, Dublin, aged 75. On her death her probate recorded a will of £1,500,000. All of this money was donated to the various charities that she was associated with.

She is commemorated in the city of Kilkenny's Lady Desart pedestrian bridge, which was unveiled by Kilkenny City Borough Council in 2014.

A biography of Lady Desart titled The Countess of Desart was published by Dun Emer Press (2021) by Gabriel Murray.

== Gallery ==
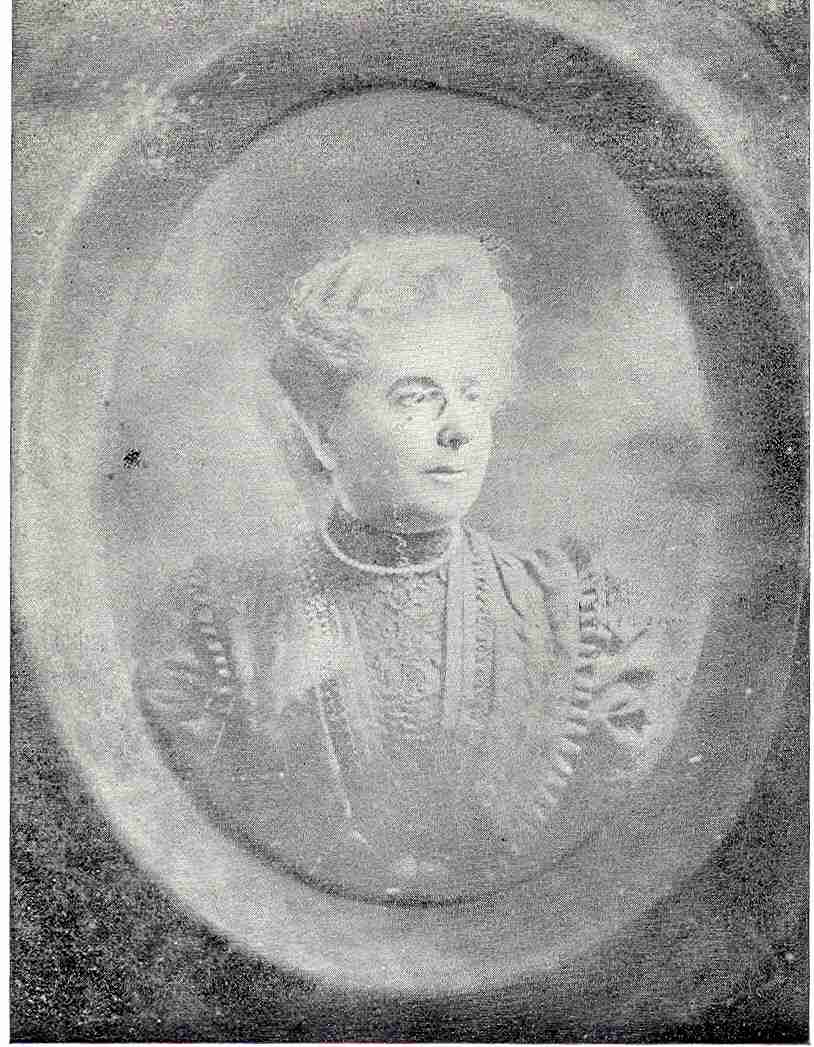
Portrait of Ellen Cuffe, Countess of Desart

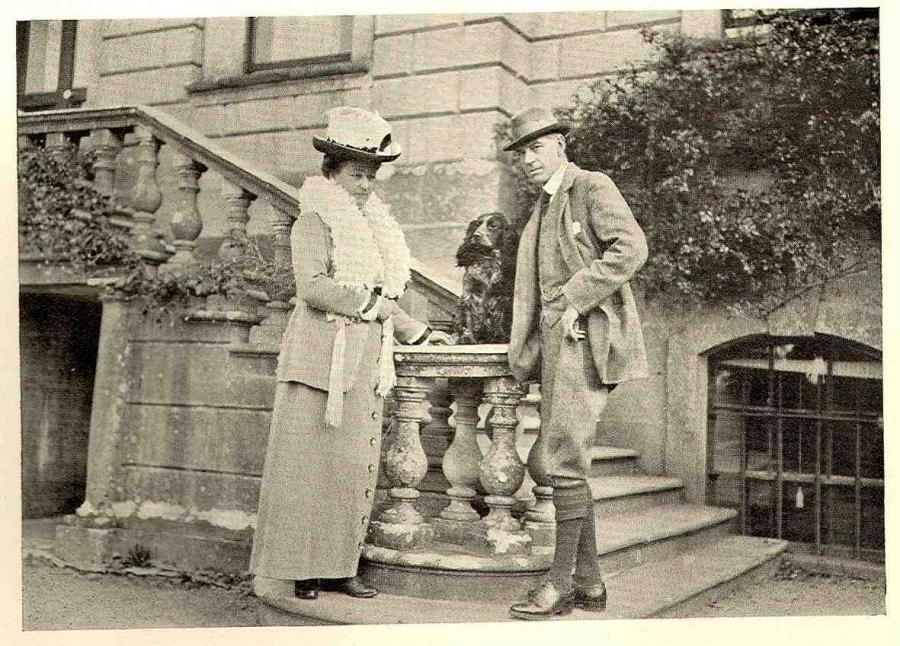
Ellen Cuffe with husband William Cuffe

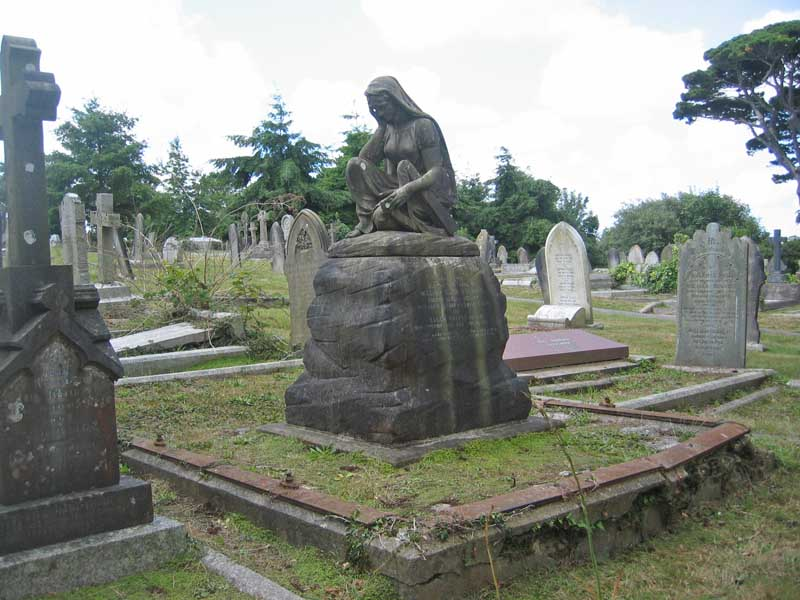
The grave of Ellen and William Cuffe

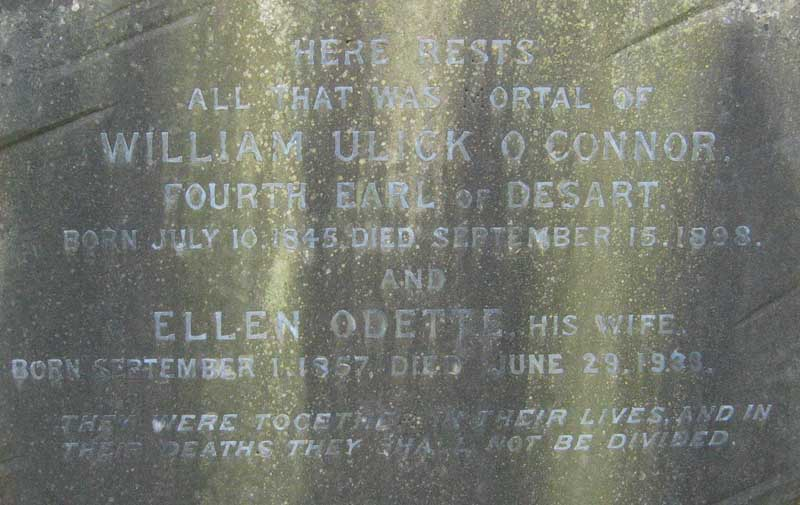
The inscription on the grave of Ellen and William Cuffe

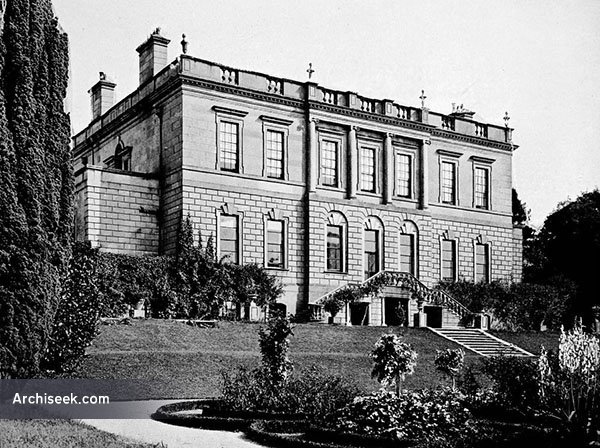
Desart Court

== Selected publications ==
- Ellen, Countess of Desart, Constance Hoster, Style and Title: a Complete Guide to Social Forms of Address (London: Christopher's, 1925)
