= Iris Origo =

British writer (1902–1988)

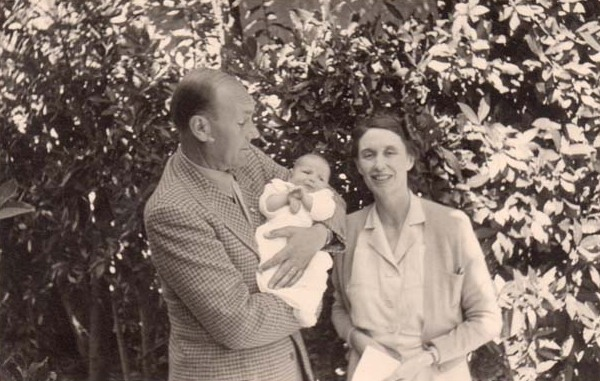
Antonio and Iris Origo with baby daughter Donata, at La Foce in 1943

Dame Iris Margaret Origo, DBE (née Cutting; 15 August 1902 – 28 June 1988) was an English-born biographer and writer. She lived in Italy and devoted much of her life to improving the Tuscan estate at La Foce, near Montepulciano, which she bought with her husband in the 1920s.

During the Second World War, she persistently sheltered refugee children and helped many escaped Allied prisoners of war and partisans, in defiance of Italy's fascist regime and Nazi occupation forces.

== Origins and upbringing ==
Origo was born as Iris Margaret Cutting at Beechwood Cottage, Birdlip, Gloucestershire, England, to the American diplomat William Bayard Cutting Jr. and Lady Sybil Marjorie Cuffe (daughter of Lord Desart, an Irish peer).

The Cutting family was a known, wealthy and philanthropic New York family – Origo was a granddaughter of William Bayard Cutting and a niece of New Mexico progressive Senator Bronson M. Cutting. Her parents travelled widely after their marriage, particularly in Italy, where her father contracted tuberculosis. He then travelled the world in search of relief from the symptoms of the disease, which killed him in 1910 at the age of 29. Before he died, William wrote to his wife that he wanted their young daughter to grow up in Italy, "free from all this national feeling which makes people so unhappy. Bring her up somewhere where she does not belong, so she cannot have it."

Iris and her mother settled in Italy, buying Villa Medici in Fiesole, one of Florence's most spectacular villas. There they became close friends with Bernard Berenson, who lived at nearby I Tatti. Iris was briefly enrolled at a London school, but mainly taught at home by Professor Solone Monti and a series of French and German governesses.

In April 1918 her mother remarried, to the architectural historian Geoffrey Scott, also of the Berensonian circle. She divorced him in 1926 and took a third husband, the essayist Percy Lubbock.

== Personal life ==
Iris Cutting travelled to England and the United States, so as to be launched into society in both countries. In 1922, she met Colin Mackenzie, a young Scottish businessman working in Milan; a romantic correspondence was followed by a passionate affair.

On 4 March 1924, Iris married Antonio Origo, an illegitimate son of Marchese Clemente Origo. They moved to their purchased 7,000 acres (2,800 ha) estate, La Foce, near Chianciano Terme in the Province of Siena. It was in an advanced state of disrepair, but their hard work, care and attention managed to transform it. Their son, Gian or Gianni Clemente Bayard (24 June 1925 – 30 April 1933), died of meningitis at the age of seven. They also had two daughters, Benedetta (born 1 August 1940) and Donata (born 9 June 1943).

== Writing career ==
After the death of her son, Iris Origo began a writing career with a well-received biography of Giacomo Leopardi, published in 1935. A reviewer noted that "an unobtrusive scholarship gives alimentation to a deft power in narrative, and the style is always alive and sometimes very beautiful." She followed this in 1938 with a life of Cola di Rienzo, a 14th-century populist revolutionary and would-be dictator in Rome. After discovering love letters between Byron and the Countess Teresa Guiccioli she wrote The Last Attachment about their relationship. The Merchant of Prato is about everyday 14th-century life, a book Origo wrote after examining a huge cache of medieval documents.

The Origos spent the Second World War at La Foce caring for refugee children, and after Italy (but not Germany) surrendered, helping escaped Allied prisoners of war trying to cross German lines or simply survive. After the war, she divided her time between La Foce and Rome, where the Origos had bought an apartment in the Palazzo Orsini, and devoted herself to writing.

War in Val d'Orcia (1947) was her first book to be popular as well as a critical success. Her 1957 book The Merchant of Prato was found to be a valuable source for students of Italian city and mercantile life, based on research in the archives of the merchant Francesco di Marco Datini (1335–1410). She also cast light on a little-known facet of medieval and early Italian life in an article, "The Domestic Enemy: the Eastern Slaves in Tuscany in the Fourteenth and Fifteenth Centuries".

The Origos holidayed at Gli Scafari, a house built by the architect Cecil Pinsent for Iris's mother, at Lerici on the Gulf of Spezia. Antonio Origo died on 27 June 1976. Iris Origo died at her estate in Tuscany on 28 June 1988, aged 85.

== Honours ==
Iris Origo was elected a Fellow of the American Academy of Arts and Sciences in 1967.

On 31 December 1976 she was appointed Dame Commander of the Order of the British Empire (DBE) "for services to British cultural interests in Italy and to Anglo-Italian relations".

La Foce is the birthplace of a chamber music festival held in Iris Origo's memory, organised by her grandson, the cellist Antonio Lysy.

== Works ==
- Allegra (1935), a short life of Byron's daughter
- Leopardi: A Study in Solitude (1935; second edition 1953), a biography of Giacomo Leopardi
- Gianni, a privately printed memorial to Iris's son
- Tribune of Rome: A Biography of Cola di Rienzo (1938), on the 14th-century Roman revolutionary
- War in Val d'Orcia (1947; NYRB edition 2018), a diary of the last years of fascism and the liberation of Italy
- The Last Attachment: The Story of Byron and Teresa Guiccioli (1949)
- Giovanni and Jane (1950), a children's book
- A Measure of Love (1957), biographical essays
- The Merchant of Prato: Francesco di Marco Datini, 1335-1410 (1957)
- "Pope Pius II" (1961), in J. H. Plumb et al., The Horizon Book of the Renaissance, Collins 1961
- Images and Shadows: Part of a Life (1970), an elegiac autobiography
- The Vagabond Path (1972), an anthology
- The World of San Bernardino (1963), a life of Bernardino of Siena
- A Need to Testify: Portraits of Lauro de Bosis, Ruth Draper, Gaetano Salvemini, Ignazio Silone and an essay on Biography (1984) (four opponents of fascism)
- Un'amica. Ritratto di Elsa Dallolio (1988), a memoir of an old friend
- A Chill in the Air: An Italian War Diary, 1939–1940 (2017), Pushkin Press, and (2018) New York Review of Books
