= John Otway Cuffe, 2nd Earl of Desart =

Anglo-Irish politician and peer

The Right Honourable The Earl of Desart

Member of Parliament for Bossiney
- In office 13 December 1808 – May 1817 Serving with James Stuart-Wortley
- Preceded by: Peter Thellusson; James Stuart-Wortley
- Succeeded by: James Stuart-Wortley; William Yates Peel

Personal details
- Born: 20 February 1788
- Died: 23 November 1820 (aged 32)
- Spouse: Catherine O'Connor (m. 1817)
- Relations: Earl of Altamont (grandfather)
- Children: John Cuffe, 3rd Earl of Desart
- Parent(s): Earl of Desart; Lady Anne Browne
- Education: Eton College
- Alma mater: Christ Church, Oxford; University of Edinburgh

John Otway Cuffe, 2nd Earl of Desart (20 February 1788 – 23 November 1820) was an Anglo-Irish politician and peer.

== Early life ==
Born on 20 February 1788, Cuffe was the son of Lady Anne Browne, daughter of Peter Browne, 2nd Earl of Altamont and Otway Cuffe, 1st Earl of Desart. His father was the second son of John Cuffe, 1st Baron Desart, a High Sheriff of County Kilkenny, by his second wife, Dorothea Gorges.

He was educated at Eton College (1802), Christ Church, Oxford (1805) and the University of Edinburgh (1807). He succeeded to his father's titles in 1804.

== Career ==
Desart served as Member of the Parliament of the United Kingdom for Bossiney, in Cornwall, between 13 December 1808 and May 1817. He held the post of one of the Lords Commissioners of the Treasury in 1809–10.

He had a home at Desart Court, County Kilkenny, Ireland, and was Mayor of Kilkenny for 1809–10.

== Personal life ==
On 7 October 1817, Catherine O'Connor (c. 1799–1874), the daughter and co-heiress of Maurice Nugent O'Connor of Mount Pleasant, King's County, and Maria Burke, daughter of Sir Thomas Burke, Bt. Together, they were the parents of one son:

- John Otway O'Connor Cuffe (1818–1865), who married Lady Elizabeth Lucy, daughter of John Campbell, 1st Earl Cawdor, in 1842.

The Earl of Desart died on 23 November 1820 and was succeeded in his titles by his only son and heir, John Otway O'Connor Cuffe, who became the 3rd Earl of Desart. After his death, his widow remarried to Rose Lambart Price, son and heir apparent to Sir Rose Price, 1st Baronet.

Parliament of the United Kingdom
Preceded by Peter Thellusson; James Stuart-Wortley	Member of Parliament for Bossiney; 1808 – 1817; With: James Stuart-Wortley	Succeeded by James Stuart-Wortley; William Yates Peel
Peerage of Ireland
Preceded by Otway Cuffe	Earl of Desart; 1804 – 1820	Succeeded by John Otway O'Conner Cuffe
