= High Sheriff of County Kilkenny =

The High Sheriff of County Kilkenny was the British Crown's judicial representative in County Kilkenny, Ireland from the 16th century until 1922, when the office was abolished in the new Free State and replaced by the office of Kilkenny County Sheriff. The sheriff had judicial, electoral, ceremonial and administrative functions and executed High Court Writs. In 1908, an Order in Council made the Lord-Lieutenant the Sovereign's prime representative in a county and reduced the High Sheriff's precedence. However, the sheriff retained his responsibilities for the preservation of law and order in the county. The usual procedure for appointing the sheriff from 1660 onwards was that three persons were nominated at the beginning of each year from the county and the Lord Lieutenant then appointed his choice as High Sheriff for the remainder of the year. Often the other nominees were appointed as under-sheriffs. Sometimes a sheriff did not fulfil his entire term through death or other event and another sheriff was then appointed for the remainder of the year. The dates given hereunder are the dates of appointment. All addresses are in County Kilkenny unless stated otherwise.

== High Sheriffs of County Kilkenny ==
- 1263: Geoffrey Forrestal
- 1302: William le Kyteler
- 1327: Fulk de la Freyne
- 1346: Roger de la Freyne
- 1382: John Sweetman
- 1385: Fulk de la Freyne, the younger
- 1388: Gilbert Blancheville
- 1390: John Sweetman, second term
- 1391: John Sweetman, third term
- 1398: John FitzRichard Blancheville
- 1422: Robert Shorthalls
- 1422: Anselm Grace
- 1447–1448: David Blanchewille
- 1450: David Blanchewille
- 1489: Piers Butler, 8th Earl of Ormond
- 1507: Walter Cowley
- 1536: Rowland Fitzgerald (alias Barron), Baron of Burnchurch
- 1543: James Eweetman
- 1564: William Sweetman
- 1579: Richard Fitzgerald, Baron of Burnchurch
- 1579–1586: Walter Walsh of Castlehale
- 1588: Sir Richard Shee
- 1640: Edward Butler, 1st Viscount Galmoye
- 1654: John Ponsonby
- 1665: Edward Evans
- 1669: Tobias Cramer of Ballyfoyle
- 1678: Henry Webb of Ballinrobe
- 1683: Balthazer Cramer
- 1694: Ebenezer Warren of Lodge
- 1693: George Reade

== 18th century ==
- 1702: James Agar
- 1703:
- 1706: Amyas Bushe of Kilfane
- 1707: Arthur Webb of Webbsborough
- 1708: John Cuffe
- 1710: Edward Deane of Terenure
- 1713: Brabazon Ponsonby, 1st Earl of Bessborough
- 1714: Oliver Cramer of Ballyfoyle
- 1715:
- 1718 :Edward Deane of Terenure
- 1720: Edward Warren of Lodge
- 1721: Toby Foley Caulfeild
- 1722:
- 1730: William Gore of Barrowmount
- 1731: William Flower, 1st Baron Castle Durrow
- 1732: James Bryan
- 1733: Amyas Bushe of Kilfane
- 1734:
- 1736: Arthur Bushe of Kilmurry
- 1740: Robert Langrishe
- 1741: Sir William Evans Morres, 1st Baronet
- 1742: Nicholas Aylward of Shankhill
- 1744: Edmond Butler
- 1745:
- 1752: Humphrey Jones of Mullinabro'
- 1753: Folliott Warren of Lodge
- 1755: Sir William Fownes, 2nd Baronet
- 1756:
- 1757: Nicholas Aylward of Shankhill
- 1758:
- 1761: Benjamin Kearney of Blanchville
- 1762: John Jones of Mullinabro'
- 1763:
- 1766: John Greene of Greeneville
- 1768: Gervase Parker Bushe of Kilfane
- 1789:
- 1777: William Power Keating Trench, 1st Earl of Clancarty
- 1778: Francis Flood
- 1782: James Kearney of Kearneyville
- 1783: Lodge Morris of Frankford
- 1784: Luke Roche of Kilkenny
- 1785: William Ridge of Durrow
- 1787: Edward Butler
- 1788:
- 1792: John Greene of Greeneville
- 1793:
- 1797: Jonah Wheeler-Denny-Cuffe, later Sir Jonah Wheeler-Denny-Cuffe, 1st Baronet, of Leyrath

== 19th century ==
- 1801: Sir Nicholas Loftus, 2nd Baronet of Mount Loftus
- 1802: Hon. Charles Harward Butler of Castlecomer
- 1804: George Roth
- 1805: Sir John Blunden, 2nd Baronet
- 1806: John Power
- 1807: Thomas Kavanagh
- 1808: Joseph Greene of Low Grange and Lake View
- 1809: Ralph Gore
- 1810: William (Nixon) Izod of Chapel Izod
- 1811: Hon. Pierce Butler
- 1812: Somerset Richard Butler, 3rd Earl of Carrick
- 1813: Sir John Blunden, 2nd Baronet
- 1814: William Morris
- 1815: Henry Wemys of Danesfort
- 1816: Nicholas Aylward
- 1817: Thomas Neville
- 1818: John Flood
- 1819: Michael Cox of Castletown
- 1820: Sir Joshua Coghill Coghill
- 1821: William Waring
- 1822: Robert Flood
- 1823: William Frederick Fownes Tighe of Woodstock
- 1823: William Greene of Lota, Co. Cork
- 1824: William Ponsonby of Bayswell
- 1825: Clayton Bayly, of Norelands
- 1827: John Fowler jnr, of Kilfane Thomastown
- 1831: John Baker of Kilcoran
- 1833: John Hawtrey Jones, of Mullinabro, Waterford
- 1834: Henry Flower, 5th Viscount Ashbrook
- 1836: Harvey Pratt (de Montmorency)
- 1836: Peter Connellan of Coolmore, Thomastown
- 1837: James Kearney Aylward of Shankhil Castle, Gore's Bridge
- 1838: John Butler Wandersforde
- 1839: Sir Theophilus John St George, 3rd Baronet of Woodsgift, Freshford
- 1841: John Power of Sion
- 1842: Robert Neville of Marymount. (died 14 September 1843)
- 1843: Sir John Blunden, 3rd Baronet
- 1844: Robert Tyndall of Oaklands.
- 1845: Charles Hely, of Foulks Court.
- 1846: George Bryan of Jenkinstown.
- 1847: Sir John Blunden, 3rd Baronet.
- 1848: William Villiers-Stuart of Castletown, Carrick-on-Suir.
- 1849: William Lloyd Flood of Farmley Castle, Callan.
- 1850: John De Montemorency of Castle Morde, Knocktopher.
- 1851:
- 1854: Purefoy Poe of Harley Park.
- 1855: James Charles Kearney of Blanchville.
- 1856: Arthur MacMurrough Kavanagh, The MacMorrough of Borris
- 1858: Howard St George of Kilrush, Freshford
- 1860: John William Smithwick
- 1861: Edward Lewis Waren of Lodge.
- 1862: Henry William Meredyth.
- 1863: Michael Richard Cahill.
- 1863: Sir Charles Frederick Denny Wheeler-Cuffe.
- 1866: Sir James Langrishe, 4th Baronet.
- 1869: Arthur Poe of Harley Park.
- 1870: Michael Sullivan of Lacken Hall.
- 1872: Harvey John de Monmorency.
- 1873: John Murphy Loftus of Mount Loftus.
- 1879: Charles Butler-Clarke-Southwell-Wandesforde of Castlecomer and Kirklington.
- 1880:
- 1883: Lt. Col. Paul Helsham Hunt.
- 1884: William Pitt Blunden.
- 1885: William Henry Izod of Chapel Izod House.
- 1886: Hector James Charles Toler-Aylward of Shankhill Castle.
- 1887: Henry John Richard Villiers-Stuart of Castletown and Castlane.
- 1888: Henry Bayly Meredyth, lately Sir Henry Bayly Meredyth, 5th Baronet
- 1889: Raymond de la Poer of Kilcronagh.
- 1890: James Hercules Fitzwalter Henry Connellan of Coolmore.
- 1891: Sir Hercules Robert Langrishe of Knocktopher Abbey.
- 1892: Godwin Butler Meade Swifte of Swiftesheath and Lionsden.
- 1893: Somerset James Butler of Kilmurry.
- 1894: Richard Henry Prior–Wandesforde of Castlecomer.
- 1895: Edward Kenrick Bunbury Tighe, of Woodstock, Inistioge.

== 20th century ==
- 1900: Thomas Brabazon Ponsonby of Kilcooley Abbey, Thurles
- 1901: George Butler of Maiden Hall.
- 1903: Charles James Butler-Kearney of Drom, Co. Tipperary and Three Castles.
- 1904: Sir William Blunden, 4th Baronet.
- 1905: Lindesay Knox of Bonnettstown.
- 1908: John Edward Blake Loftus of Mount Loftus.
- 1910: Stanislas Thomas Eyre of Uppercourt.
- 1911: Walter Charles Lindsay of Ballykinch House.
- 1914: Windham Wyndham-Quin, 5th Earl of Dunraven and Mount-Earl.
- 1917: Godfrey Herbert Bloomfield.
- 1920: Alfred John Mockler of Castle Annagh, New Ross.
- 1921: John Pratt Montmorency.
