= Otway Cuffe, 1st Earl of Desart =

Anglo-Irish peer and lawyer

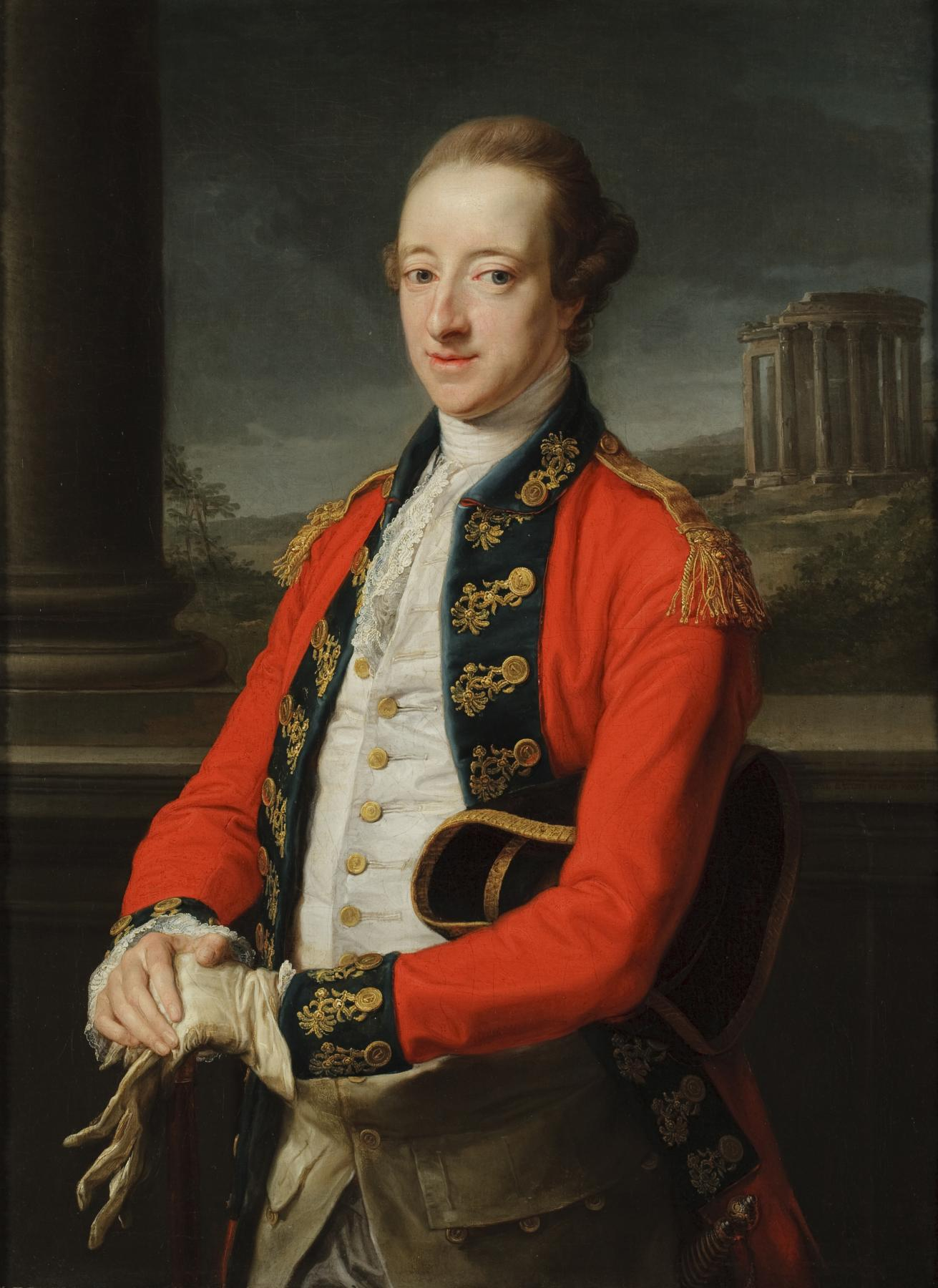
Third Baron Desart, by Pompeo Girolamo Batoni, 1769

Otway Cuffe, 1st Earl of Desart (25 November 1737 – 9 August 1804), was an Anglo-Irish peer and lawyer.

== Biography ==
Desart was the second son of John Cuffe, 1st Baron Desart, by his second wife, Dorothea Gorges. He was educated at Christ Church, Oxford. He was a barrister and became a member of the Inner Temple in 1756. On 25 November 1767 he succeeded his elder brother, John Cuffe, 2nd Baron Desart, in his title, and assumed his seat in the Irish House of Lords. Desart served as Mayor of Kilkenny between 1771 and 1772 and again between 1779 and 1780. On 6 January 1781 he was created Viscount Desart, of Desart in the County of Kilkenny, in the Peerage of Ireland. He was further honoured when he was made Earl of Desart and Viscount Castlecuffe, also titles in the Peerage of Ireland, on 4 December 1793. Following the implementation of the Acts of Union 1800, Desart was elected as one of the original 28 Irish representative peers, and attended the House of Lords until his death four years later.

He married Lady Anne Browne, daughter of Peter Browne, 2nd Earl of Altamont, and Elizabeth Kelly, on 18 August 1785. Together they had three children. He was succeeded by his eldest son, John Otway Cuffe.

Parliament of the United Kingdom
New post	Representative peer for Ireland; 1800–1804	Succeeded by The Earl of Caledon
Peerage of Ireland
New creation	Earl of Desart; 1793–1804	Succeeded by John Otway Cuffe
New creation	Viscount Desart; 1781–1804	Succeeded by John Otway Cuffe
Preceded by John Cuffe	Baron Desart; 1767–1804	Succeeded by John Otway Cuffe
