= Clemente Origo =

Italian painter

Clemente Origo, Marchese Origo (28 February 1855 in Rome – 29 September 1921 in Florence) was an Italian painter.

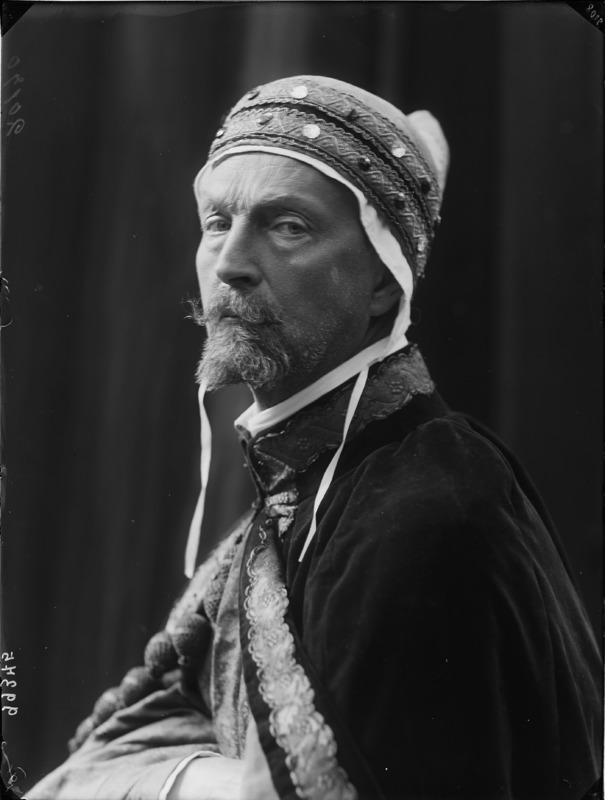
Clemente Origo

== Biography ==
He was a resident of Florence. His subjects commonly display cattle and horses and scenes of herding in the Italian lowlands. he also painted landscapes, often exhibiting at the Promotrice of Florence and other Italian exhibitions. Among his works are Testa dì cavallo, studio dal vero; Cavalli al trotto; Mandria al pascolo; Strada di Larici, studio dal vero, Cavallino caduto (1902, Uffizi), Morte del cervo (1907), and plans for the Monument to Alexander III at St Petersburg, Russia. Origo had studied design briefly with Cesare Fracassini and with Guglielmo de Sanctis. He later dedicated himself to sculpture, working with P. Trubeckoj.
