= John Cuffe, 1st Baron Desart =

Anglo-Irish politician and peer

John Cuffe, 1st Baron Desart (died 26 June 1749) was an Anglo-Irish politician and peer.

He was the son of Agmondisham Cuffe and his wife, Anne Otway. He was educated at Trinity College, Dublin. In 1708 he was High Sheriff of County Kilkenny. He served in the Irish House of Commons as the Member of Parliament for Thomastown between 1715 and 1727. On 10 November 1733 he was raised to the Peerage of Ireland as Baron Desart, of Desart in the County of Kilkenny, and assumed his seat in the Irish House of Lords.

He was succeeded in his title by his eldest son from his second marriage, John Cuffe. His second son, Otway Cuffe, was made Earl of Desart in 1793.

Political offices
Preceded by Arthur Webb	High Sheriff of County Kilkenny; 1708	Succeeded by Edward Deane
Parliament of Ireland
Preceded by Amyas Bushe; Arthur Bushe	Member of Parliament for Thomastown; 1715–1727; With: William Flower (1715); William Despard (1715–1721); Richard Bettesworth (1721–1727)	Succeeded by Luke Gardiner; Nicholas Aylward
Peerage of Ireland
New creation	Baron Desart; 1733–1749	Succeeded by John Cuffe
