= John Cuffe, 3rd Earl of Desart =

Irish Conservative politician

The Right Honourable The Earl of Desart
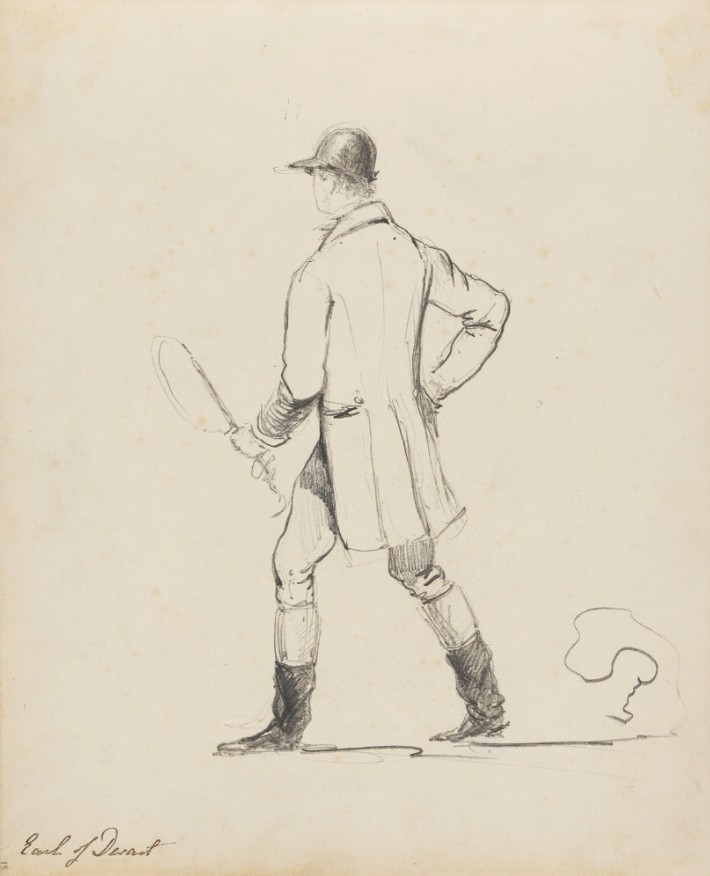
- Drawing of Cuffe by Henry Richard Graves, 1848

Under-Secretary of State for War and the Colonies
- In office 2 March 1852 – 17 December 1852
- Monarch: Victoria
- Prime Minister: The Earl of Derby
- Preceded by: Frederick Peel
- Succeeded by: Frederick Peel

Personal details
- Born: 12 October 1818
- Died: 1 April 1865 (aged 46)
- Party: Conservative
- Spouse(s): Lady Elizabeth Campbell (1822-1898)

John Otway O'Conner Cuffe, 3rd Earl of Desart (12 October 1818 – 1 April 1865), styled Viscount Castlecuffe until 1820, was an Irish Conservative politician. He served as Under-Secretary of State for War and the Colonies between March and December 1852 in the Earl of Derby's first administration.

== Background ==
Desart was the son of John Cuffe, 2nd Earl of Desart, and Catherine, daughter of Maurice O'Connor. He succeeded in the earldom in November 1820, aged two, on the early death of his father. He was educated at Eton College and entered Christ Church, Oxford in 1836 but took no degree.

== Political career ==
Desart sat in the House of Commons as Member of Parliament for Ipswich between June and July 1842, when his election was declared void. He didn't stand in the subsequent by-election. In 1846 he was elected an Irish representative peer and thus took a seat in the House of Lords, which he held until his death in 1865. He served as Under-Secretary of State for War and the Colonies in Lord Derby's short-lived protectionist government of 1852.

== Family ==
Lord Desart married Lady Elizabeth Lucy, daughter of John Campbell, 1st Earl Cawdor, in 1842. They had three sons and a daughter. He died at his London home in Eaton Square on 1 April 1865, through a fall suffered during an attack of paralysis, aged 46. He was succeeded in the earldom by his son, William. The Countess of Desart died in April 1898, aged 76.

Parliament of the United Kingdom
Preceded by Rigby Wason; George Rennie	Member of Parliament for Ipswich; 3 June - 17 August, 1842; With: Thomas Gladstone	Succeeded by John Neilson Gladstone; Sackville Walter Lane-Fox
Preceded by The Marquess of Thomond	Representative peer for Ireland; 1846–1865	Succeeded by The Viscount Gort
Political offices
Preceded by Frederick Peel	Under-Secretary of State for War and the Colonies; 1852	Succeeded by Frederick Peel
Peerage of Ireland
Preceded by John Cuffe	Earl of Desart; 1820–1865	Succeeded by William Cuffe
