= Earl of Bessborough =

Title in the peerage of Ireland

Earldom of Bessborough
- Arms of the Earl of Bessborough Blazon Arms: Gules, a chevron between three combs argent. Crest: Out of a ducal coronet azure, three arrows, one in pale, two in saltire, points downwards, entwined by a snake, proper. Supporters: Two lions regardant proper. Motto: Pro rege, lege, grege (For king, law and people).
- Creation date: 6 October 1739
- Created by: King George II
- Peerage: Peerage of Ireland
- First holder: Brabazon Ponsonby, 1st Earl of Bessborough
- Present holder: Myles Ponsonby, 12th Earl of Bessborough
- Heir apparent: Frederick Ponsonby, Viscount Duncannon
- Remainder to: the 1st Earl's heirs male of the body lawfully begotten.
- Subsidiary titles: Viscount Duncannon; Baron Bessborough; Baron Duncannon of Bessborough; Baron Ponsonby of Sysonby
- Seat: Stansted Park
- Former seats: Bishopscourt House; Bessborough House; Parkstead House
- Arms: Gules, a chevron between three combs argent

Earl of Bessborough is a title in the Peerage of Ireland. It was created in 1739 for Brabazon Ponsonby, 2nd Viscount Duncannon, who had previously represented Newtownards and County Kildare in the Irish House of Commons. In 1749, he was given the additional title of Baron Ponsonby of Sysonby, in the County of Leicester, in the Peerage of Great Britain, which entitled him to a seat in the British House of Lords. The titles Viscount Duncannon, of the fort of Duncannon in the County of Wexford, and Baron Bessborough, of Bessborough, Piltown, in the County of Kilkenny, had been created in the Peerage of Ireland in 1723 and 1721 respectively for Lord Bessborough's father William Ponsonby, who had earlier represented County Kilkenny in the Irish House of Commons.

The first Earl was succeeded by his eldest son, the second Earl. He was a Whig politician and served as a Lord of the Treasury, a Lord of the Admiralty and as Joint Postmaster General. His son, the third Earl, represented Knaresborough in the House of Commons as a Whig and like his father served as a Lord of the Admiralty. He was succeeded by his eldest son, the fourth Earl. He was a prominent Whig politician and served as First Commissioner of Woods and Forests, as Home Secretary, as Lord Privy Seal and as First Lord of the Admiralty. In 1834, ten years before he succeeded his father, he was raised to the Peerage of the United Kingdom in his own right as Baron Duncannon, of Bessborough in County Kilkenny. His eldest son, the fifth Earl, was a Liberal politician and held office under Lord Russell and William Ewart Gladstone as Lord Steward of the Household. He was childless and was succeeded by his younger brother, the sixth Earl. He never married and on his death in 1906, the titles passed to his younger brother, the seventh Earl. He was a clergyman. His grandson, the ninth Earl, was a Conservative politician and also served as Governor General of Canada from 1931 to 1935. In 1937, he was created Earl of Bessborough in the Peerage of the United Kingdom. His son, the tenth Earl, sat on the Conservative benches in the House of Lords and served as Joint Under-Secretary of State for Education in 1964 and as Minister of State at the Ministry of Technology in 1970. He was later a member of the European Parliament. Lord Bessborough had one daughter but no sons, and on his death in 1993, the 1937 earldom became extinct. He was succeeded in the other titles by his first cousin, who became the eleventh Earl. He was the son of Major the Hon. Cyril Myles Brabazon Ponsonby, second son of the eighth Earl. As of 2017, the titles are held by his son, the twelfth Earl, who succeeded in 2002.

Several other members of the family have gained distinction. The Hon. John Ponsonby, second son of the first Earl, served as Speaker of the Irish House of Commons and was the father of William Ponsonby, 1st Baron Ponsonby, and George Ponsonby, Lord Chancellor of Ireland. Major-General the Hon. Sir Frederick Ponsonby, second son of the third Earl, was the father of General Sir Henry Ponsonby, who was the father of Frederick Ponsonby, 1st Baron Sysonby, and Arthur Ponsonby, 1st Baron Ponsonby of Shulbrede. The Hon. William Ponsonby, third son of the third Earl, was created Baron de Mauley in 1838 while Lady Caroline Ponsonby, only daughter of the third Earl, was the wife of Prime Minister William Lamb, 2nd Viscount Melbourne, but is perhaps best remembered for her affair with Lord Byron. Sir Spencer Ponsonby-Fane, sixth son of the fourth Earl, was for many years Comptroller of the Lord Chamberlain's Department and was admitted to the Privy Council in 1901.

== Family seat ==
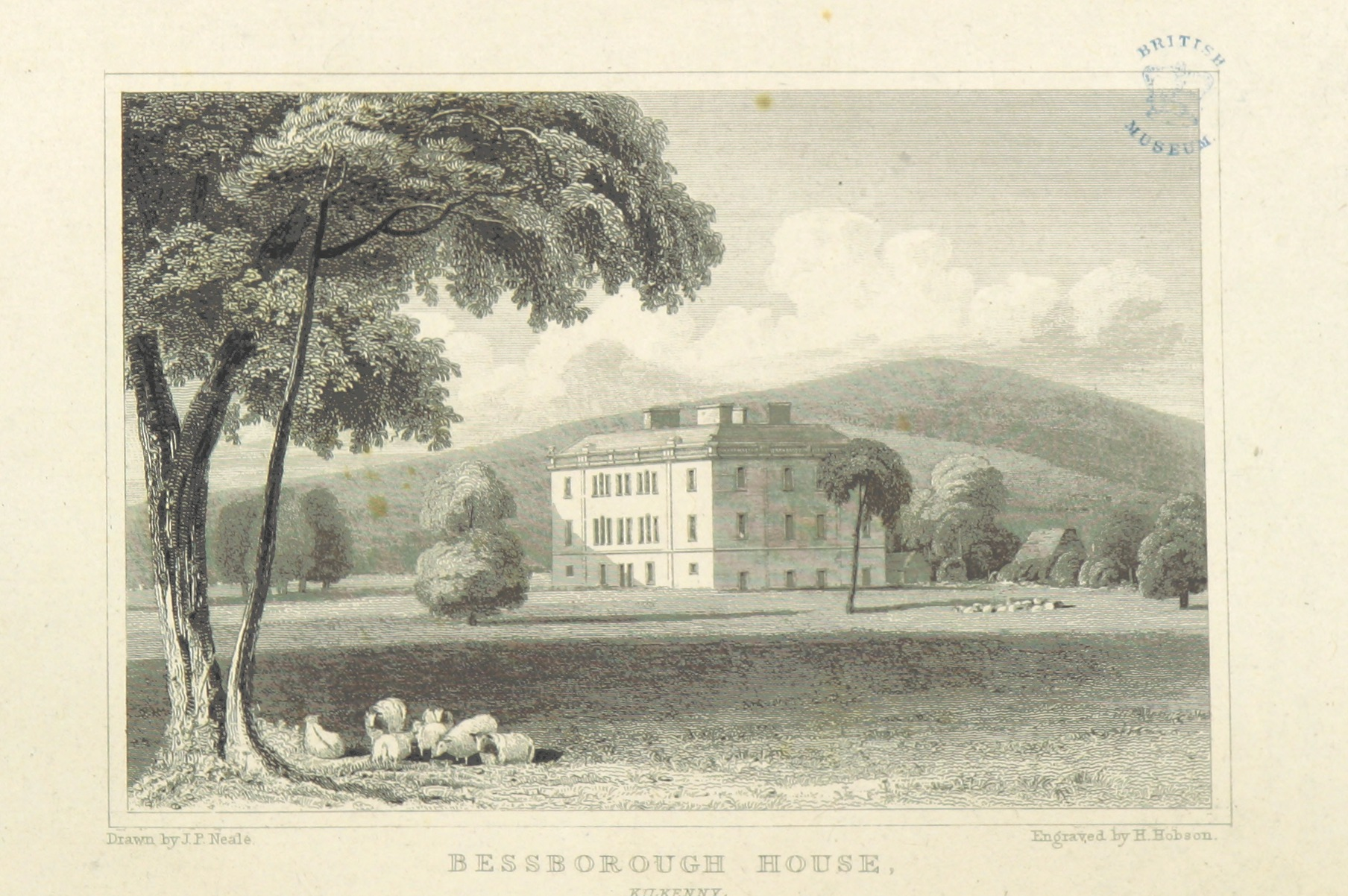
Bessborough House (1818) (by John Preston Neale)

The present family seat is Stansted Park, near Stoughton, West Sussex, acquired by the 9th Earl in 1924. Previous family seats include Bishopscourt House near Bishopscourt, County Kildare, and Parkstead House in Roehampton, London. The family's former main seat in Ireland was Bessborough House, built in the 1740s for the 1st Earl. Located near the village of Piltown in the south of County Kilkenny, the house was sold by the 9th Earl in the late 1930s. Bessborough House is now part of Kildalton Agricultural College.

== Baron Bessborough (1721) ==
- William Ponsonby, 1st Baron Bessborough (1659–1724; created Viscount Duncannon in 1723)

=== Viscount Duncannon (1723) ===
- William Ponsonby, 1st Viscount Duncannon (1659–1724)
- Brabazon Ponsonby, 2nd Viscount Duncannon (1679–1758; created Earl of Bessborough in 1739)

=== Earl of Bessborough (1739) ===
- Brabazon Ponsonby, 1st Earl of Bessborough (1679–1758; created Baron Ponsonby of Sysonby [GB] in 1749)
- William Ponsonby, 2nd Earl of Bessborough (1704–1793)
- Frederick Ponsonby, 3rd Earl of Bessborough (1758–1844)
- John William Ponsonby, 4th Earl of Bessborough (1781–1847; created Baron Duncannon [UK] in 1834)
- John George Brabazon Ponsonby, 5th Earl of Bessborough (1809–1880)
- Frederick George Brabazon Ponsonby, 6th Earl of Bessborough (1815–1895)
- Walter William Brabazon Ponsonby, 7th Earl of Bessborough (1821–1906)
- Edward Ponsonby, 8th Earl of Bessborough (1851–1920)
- Vere Brabazon Ponsonby, 9th Earl of Bessborough (1880–1956; created Earl of Bessborough [UK] in 1937)
- Frederick Edward Neuflize Ponsonby, 10th Earl of Bessborough (1913–1993)
- Arthur Mountifort Longfield Ponsonby, 11th Earl of Bessborough (1912–2002)
- Myles Fitzhugh Longfield Ponsonby, 12th Earl of Bessborough (born 1941)

=== Present peer ===
Myles Fitzhugh Longfield Ponsonby, 12th Earl of Bessborough (born 16 February 1941), is the son of the 11th Earl and his wife Patricia Minnigerode. He was educated at Harrow School and Trinity College, Cambridge, where he graduated MA. He is also a Fellow of the Institute of Chartered Accountants in England and Wales.

He was styled as Viscount Duncannon between 1993 and 5 April 2002, when he succeeded his father as Earl of Bessborough (I., 1739), Viscount Duncannon (I., 1723), Baron Bessborough (I., 1721), Baron Ponsonby of Sysonby (G.B., 1749), and Baron Duncannon of Bessborough (U.K., 1834).

In 2003 he was living at Stansted Park, Rowland's Castle, Hampshire.

In 1972, he married Alison Marjorie Storey, daughter of William Henry Storey (1905–1975) and Marjorie Egerton Shakerley (1908–2001). They have three children:

- Frederick Arthur William Ponsonby, Viscount Duncannon (born 1974), heir apparent, whose heir is his son, the Hon. William August Longfield Ponsonby (born 2008)
- Lady Chloë Patricia Ponsonby (born 1975)
- Hon. Henry Ponsonby (born 1977)

=== Title succession chart ===
Title succession chart

Title succession chart, Barons Bessborough, Viscounts Duncannon, and Earls of Bessborough.

Baron Bessborough; Viscount Duncannon
William Ponsonby; 1st Viscount Duncannon; 1st Baron Bessborough; 1659–1724
Earl of Bessborough (Ireland); Baron Ponsonby of Sysonby (Great Britain)
Brabazon Ponsonby; 1st Earl of Bessborough; 1679–1758
William Ponsonby; 2nd Earl of Bessborough; 1704–1793
Frederick Ponsonby; 3rd Earl of Bessborough; 1758–1844
Baron Duncannon (United Kingdom)
John Ponsonby; 4th Earl of Bessborough; 1781–1847
John Ponsonby; 5th Earl of Bessborough; 1809–1880 | William Ponsonby; 1812–1831 | Frederick Ponsonby; 6th Earl of Bessborough; 1815–1895 | George Ponsonby; 1820–1841 | Walter Ponsonby; 7th Earl of Bessborough; 1821–1906
Edward Ponsonby; 8th Earl of Bessborough; 1851–1920
Earl of Bessborough (United Kingdom)
Vere Ponsonby; 9th Earl of Bessborough; 1880–1956 | Maj. Hon. Myles Ponsonby; 1881–1915
Frederick Ponsonby; 10th Earl of Bessborough; 1913–1993 | Hon. Desmond Ponsonby; 1915–1925 | Hon. George Ponsonby; 1931–1951 | Arthur Ponsonby; 11th Earl of Bessborough; 1912–2002
UK earldom extinct
Myles Ponsonby; 12th Earl of Bessborough born 1941
Frederick Ponsonby; Viscount Duncannon born 1974
Hon. William Ponsonby born 2008

=== Relationship with other Ponsonby families ===
The baronies Ponsonby of Shulbrede and de Mauley are in the remainder for the earldom of Bessborough. The present holders – Frederick Ponsonby, 4th Baron Ponsonby of Shulbrede, and Rupert Ponsonby, 7th Baron de Mauley – are both fifth cousins of the 12th Earl of Bessborough (and of each other, both being descendants of younger sons of the 3rd Earl; see chart below).

It is however unlikely that either of them would inherit the earldom, as the 12th Earl has two sons and a grandson, as well as two younger halfbrothers, both of whom with male issue. There is also an unbroken line of male descendants from the fourth son of the 7th Earl.

Relationship with other Ponsonby families

Relationship with the Barons Sysonby (extinct), the Barons Ponsonby of Shulbrede, the Barons de Mauley, and the Barons Ponsonby of Imokilly (extinct).

Baron Bessborough; Viscount Duncannon
William Ponsonby; 1st Viscount Duncannon; 1st Baron Bessborough; 1659–1724
Earl of Bessborough (Ireland); Baron Ponsonby of Sysonby (Great Britain)
Brabazon Ponsonby; 1st Earl of Bessborough; 1679–1758
William Ponsonby; 2nd Earl of Bessborough; 1704–1793 | Hon. John Ponsonby
Frederick Ponsonby; 3rd Earl of Bessborough; 1758–1844 | William Ponsonby; 1st Baron Ponsonby of Imokilly
For descendants, see Baron Ponsonby of Imokilly.
Baron Duncannon (United Kingdom)
John Ponsonby; 4th Earl of Bessborough; 1781–1847 | Maj. Gen. Hon. Frederick Ponsonby | William Ponsonby; 1st Baron de Mauley
For descendants, see Baron de Mauley
John Ponsonby; 5th Earl of Bessborough; 1809–1880 | William Ponsonby; 1812–1831 | Frederick Ponsonby; 6th Earl of Bessborough; 1815–1895 | George Ponsonby; 1820–1841 | Walter Ponsonby; 7th Earl of Bessborough; 1821–1906 | Maj. Gen. Rt. Hon. Henry Ponsonby
Edward Ponsonby; 8th Earl of Bessborough; 1851–1920 | Maj. Gen. John Ponsonby | Frederick Ponsonby; 1st Baron Sysonby | Arthur Ponsonby; 1st Baron Ponsonby of Shulbrede
For descendants, see title succession chart above | For descendants, see Baron Sysonby | For descendants, see Baron Ponsonby of Shulbrede

== See also ==
- Baron Sysonby
- Baron Ponsonby of Shulbrede
- Baron de Mauley
- Ponsonby baronets of Wootton
- Baron Ponsonby of Imokilly
