= William Ponsonby =

William Ponsonby may refer to:

- William Ponsonby (publisher) (died 1604), English publisher in the Elizabethan era
- William Ponsonby, 2nd Earl of Bessborough (1704–1793), British & Irish MP, Chief Secretary for Ireland, Postmaster-General of Great Britain
- William Ponsonby, 1st Baron Ponsonby (1744–1806), Member of Parliament for Bandonbridge and Kilkenny, Postmaster-General of Ireland
- William Ponsonby (British Army officer) (1772–1815), British major-general in the Battle of Waterloo, Irish Member of Parliament
- William Ponsonby, 1st Baron de Mauley (1787–1855), British Member of Parliament for Poole, Knaresborough and Dorset
- William Ponsonby, 1st Viscount Duncannon (1659–1724), Anglo-Irish peer
