= Sysonby =

Sysonby may refer to:

- Sysonby (horse) (1902–1906), an American Thoroughbred racehorse
- Sysonby, Leicestershire, England
- Sysonby Handicap, a horse race named after the horse
- Baron Sysonby, a title in the Peerage of the United Kingdom
- Victoria Ponsonby, Baroness Sysonby (1874 – 1955), a British cookbook author
