= Baron Ponsonby of Imokilly =

Extinct title in the Peerage of the United Kingdom

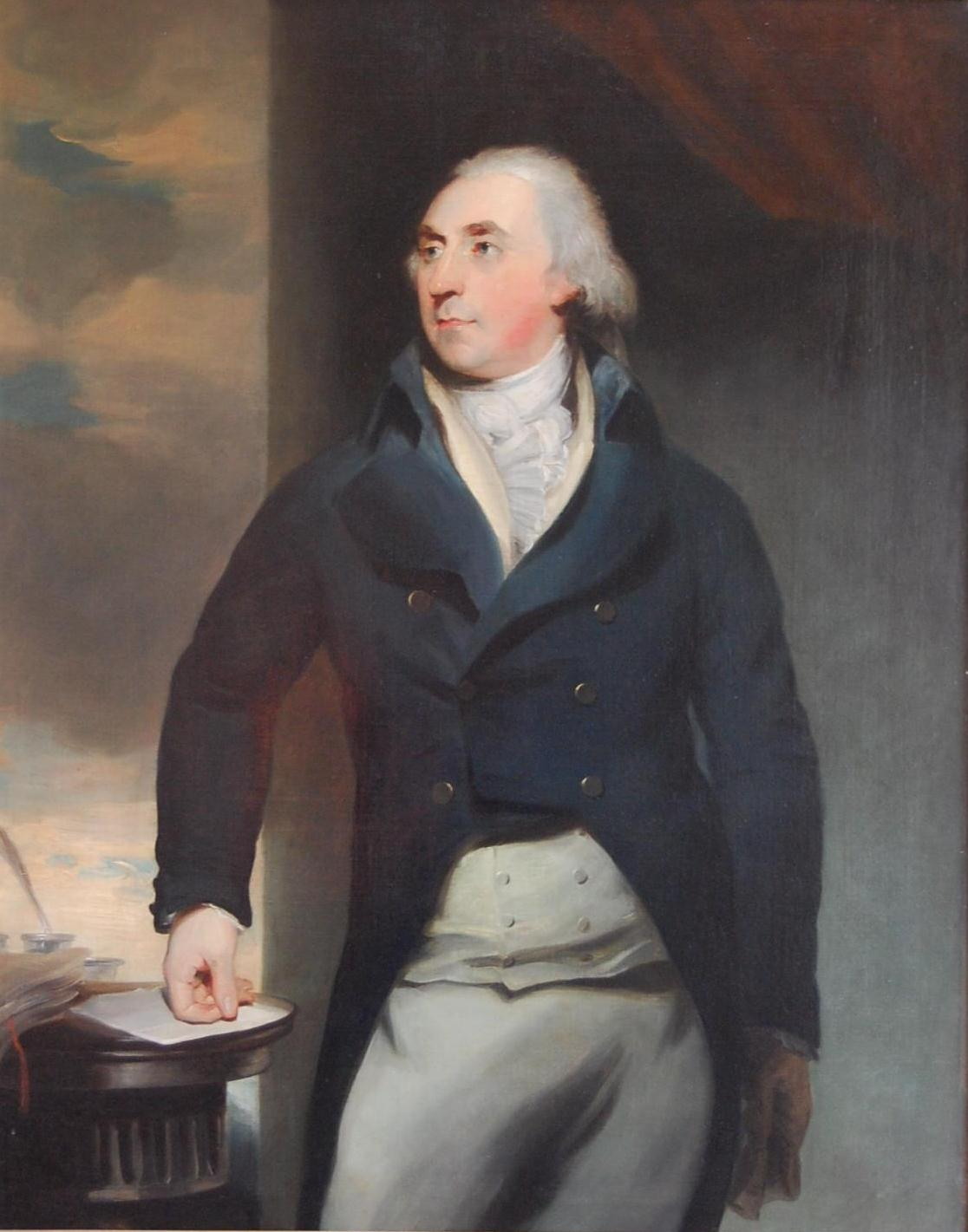
William Ponsonby, 1st Baron Ponsonby.

Baron Ponsonby, of Imokilly in County Cork, also referred to as Baron Ponsonby of Imokilly, in the County of Cork, was a title in the Peerage of the United Kingdom. It was created in 1806 for the William Ponsonby, who had previously represented Cork City, Bandonbridge and County Kilkenny in the Irish House of Commons and County Kilkenny in the British House of Commons. A member of the influential Ponsonby family, he was the eldest son of the Honourable John Ponsonby, second son of Brabazon Ponsonby, 1st Earl of Bessborough (see Earl of Bessborough for earlier history of the family). His son, the second Baron, was a prominent diplomat and notably served as Ambassador to the Ottoman Empire and Austria. In 1839 he was created Viscount Ponsonby, of Imokilly in the County of Cork, in the Peerage of the United Kingdom. He was childless and the viscountcy became extinct on his death in 1855. He was succeeded in the barony by his nephew, the third Baron. He was the posthumous son of the Honourable Sir William Ponsonby, second son of the first Baron. Lord Ponsonby died childless and was succeeded by his first cousin, the fourth Baron. He was the son of the Right Reverend the Honourable Richard Ponsonby, third son of the first Baron. He died unmarried in 1866 when the barony became extinct.

The aforementioned the Honourable Sir William Ponsonby, second son of the first Baron, was a Major-General in the British Army and was killed in action at the Battle of Waterloo. The aforementioned the Right Reverend the Honourable Richard Ponsonby, third son of the first Baron, was Bishop of Derry and Raphoe. The Hon. Mary Elizabeth, only daughter of the first Baron, was the wife of Prime Minister Charles Grey, 2nd Earl Grey. George Ponsonby, brother of the first Baron, was Lord Chancellor of Ireland.

== Barons Ponsonby (1806) ==
- William Ponsonby, 1st Baron Ponsonby (1744–1806)
- John Ponsonby, 2nd Baron Ponsonby (c. 1770–1855, created Viscount Ponsonby in 1839)

=== Viscounts Ponsonby (1839) ===
- John Ponsonby, 1st Viscount Ponsonby (c. 1770 – 1855)

=== Barons Ponsonby of Imokilly (1806; reverted) ===
- William Ponsonby, 3rd Baron Ponsonby (1816–1861), nephew of the Viscount
- William Ponsonby, 4th Baron Ponsonby (1807–1866), cousin of the preceding

=== Title succession chart ===
Title succession chart, Barons Ponsonby of Imokilly.

William Ponsonby; 1st Baron Ponsonby; 1744–1806
Viscount Ponsonby
John Ponsonby; 1st Viscount Ponsonby; 2nd Baron Ponsonby c. 1770 – 1855	Maj. Gen. Hon. William Ponsonby; 1772–1815	Rt. Rev. Hon. Richard Ponsonby; 1772–1853	Hon. George Ponsonby died 1863	Hon. Frederick Ponsonby died 1849
Viscountcy extinct
William Ponsonby; 3rd Baron Ponsonby; 1816–1861	William Ponsonby; 4th Baron Ponsonby; 1807–1866	William Ponsonby; 1808–1841	Robert Ponsonby; 1814–1840
Barony extinct

== See also ==
- Earl of Bessborough
- Baron de Mauley
- Baron Sysonby
- Baron Ponsonby of Shulbrede
