= Bessborough House =

Palladian house in County Kilkenny, Ireland

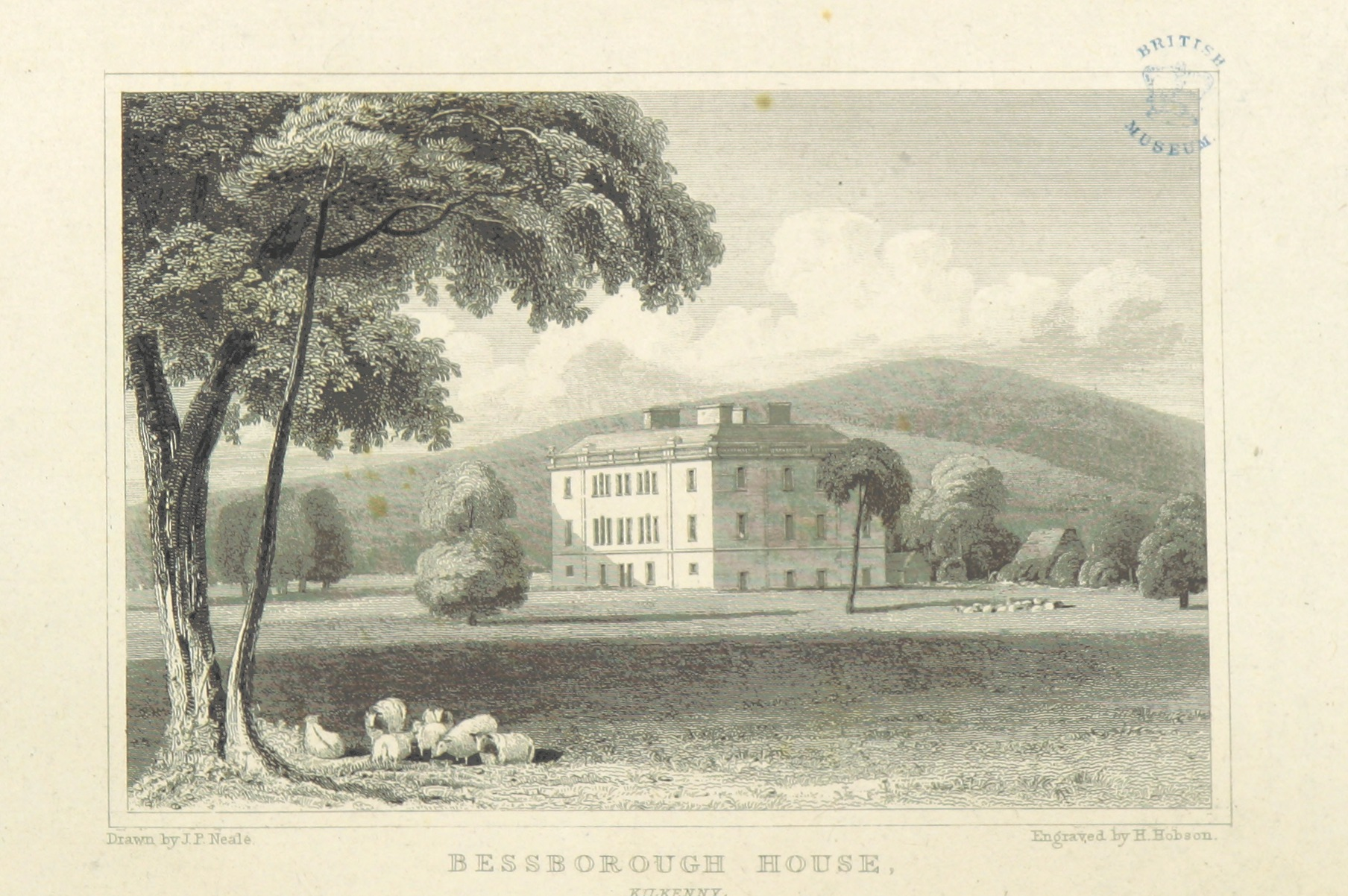
- 1818 illustration of the house

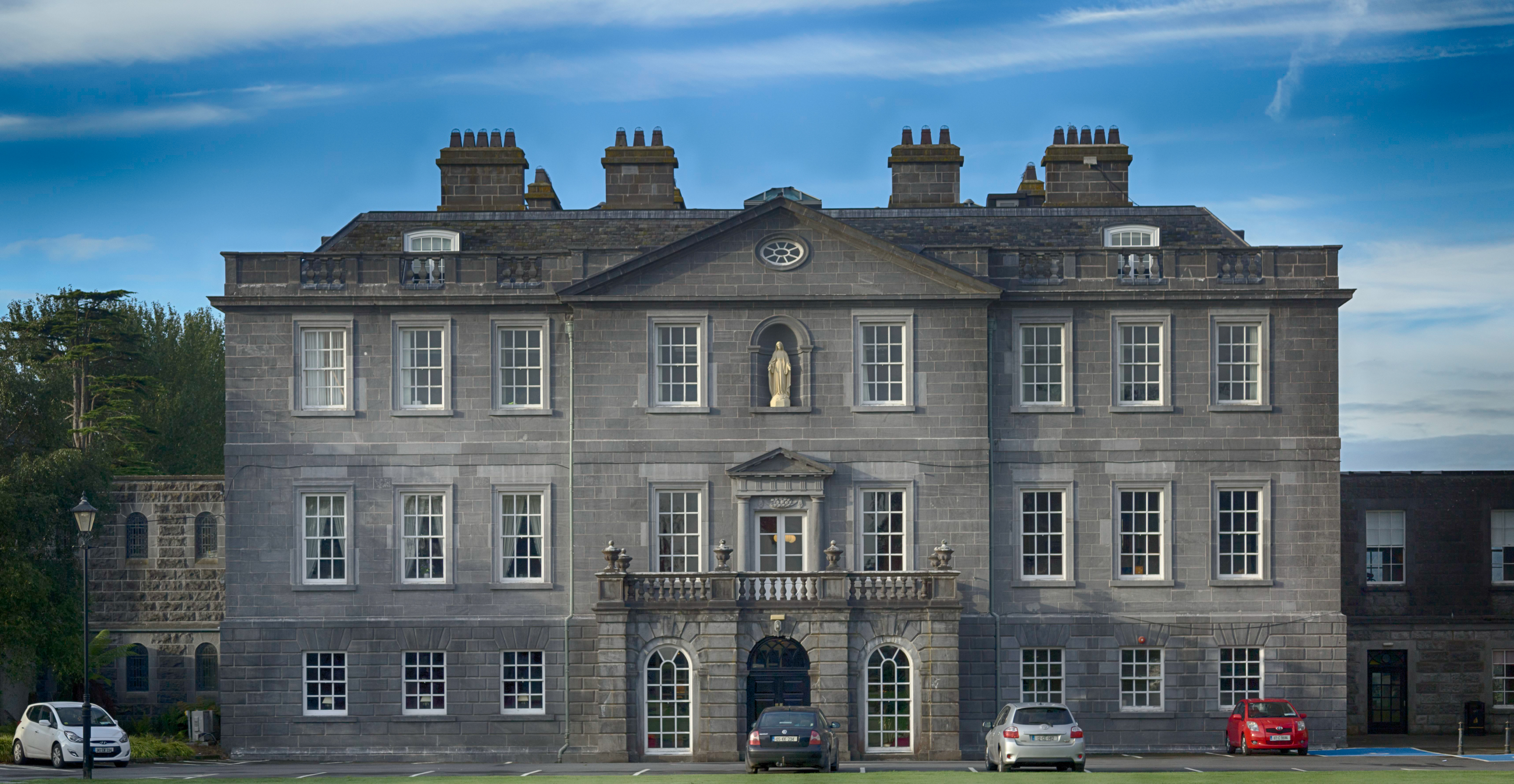
- Modern day appearance of the house
- Interactive map of the Bessborough House area

General information
- Type: House
- Architectural style: Palladian
- Location: Piltown, Ireland
- Coordinates: 52.354125°N 7.3141555°W
- Current tenants: Kildalton Agricultural College (Teagasc)
- Named for: Elizabeth Folliott, wife of Sir John Ponsonby
- Construction started: 1744
- Renovated: 1925-30 following arson in 1923
- Owner: Department of Agriculture, Food and the Marine

Height
- Height: 30 m (98 ft)

Technical details
- Material: limestone
- Floor count: 3

Design and construction
- Architect: Francis Bindon
- Developer: Brabazon Ponsonby, 1st Earl of Bessborough
- Main contractor: William Colles

Renovating team
- Architect: Harry Stuart Goodhart-Rendel

Bessborough House is a large Georgian house near Piltown, County Kilkenny that was the family seat of the Ponsonby dynasty, Earls of Bessborough.

== History ==
Kildalton Castle and estate were owned by the Dalton Family, and was awarded to Colonel John Ponsonby, one of the leaders of the Cromwellian invasion of Ireland.

The Georgian house was originally built in the 1740s for the 1st Earl of Bessborough. It was likely designed by Francis Bindon.

The house was gutted by fire in February 1923, during the Irish Civil War. However, it was rebuilt in late 1929 for The 9th Earl of Bessborough, who served as the 14th Governor General of Canada in the early 1930s. The 9th Lord Bessborough sold the house in the late 1930s.

The Oblate Fathers who established a seminary there in 1941, over the following 30 years some 360 were ordained for the order there, they would study philosophy at UCD and theology at the Our Lady's Scholasticate in Bessbrough.

Bessborough House was sold by the Oblates in 1971 to the Department of Agriculture and was opened in 1980 as Kildalton Agricultural College.

== See also ==
- Castletown Cox
