= Piltown =

Town in County Kilkenny, Ireland

Piltown Irish: Baile an Phoill
- Town
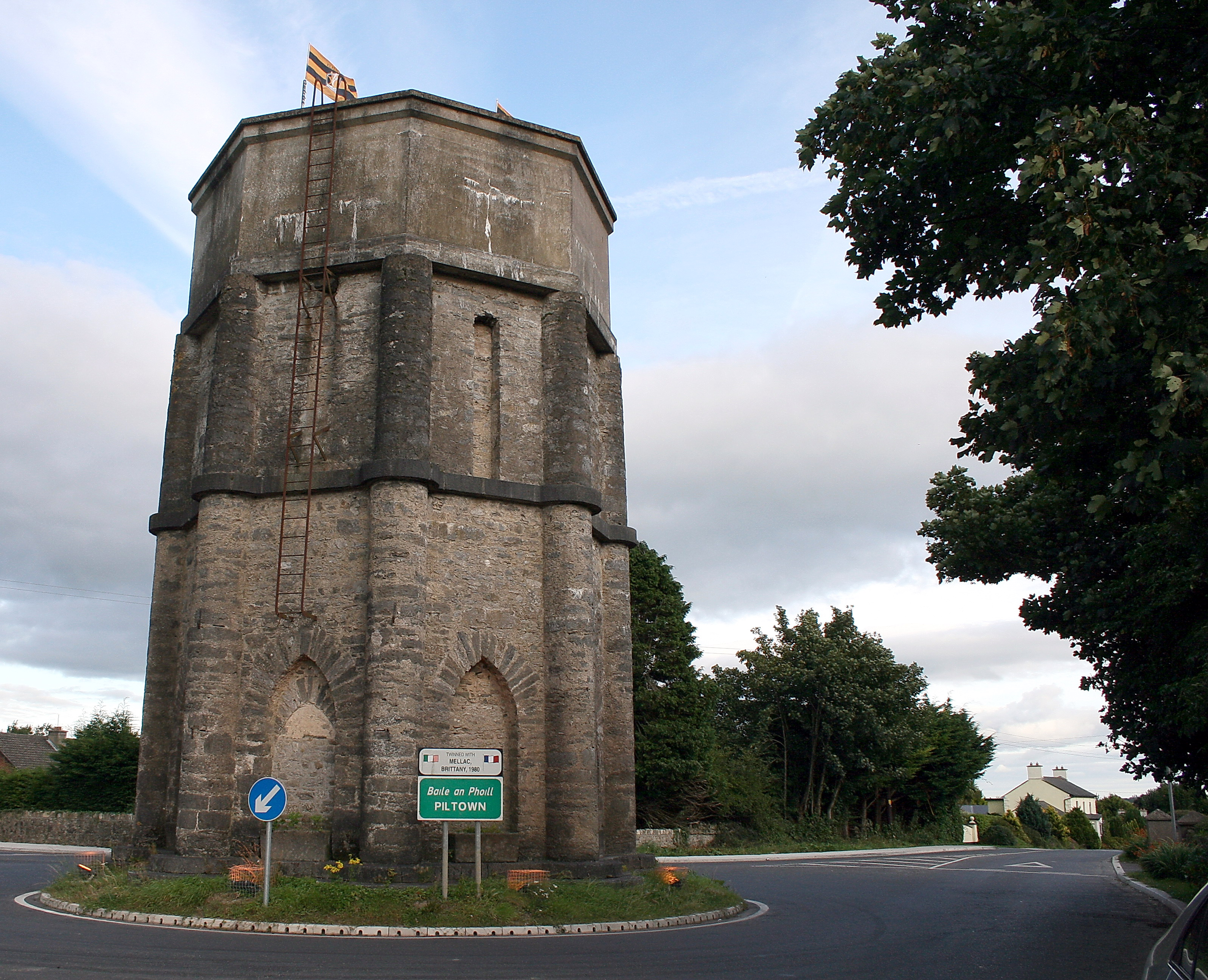
- Sham Castle, Piltown

- Location in Ireland
- Coordinates: 52°21′00″N 7°20′00″W
- Country: Ireland
- Province: Leinster
- County: County Kilkenny
- Elevation: 10 m (33 ft)

Population (2016)
  - Total: 1,220
- Time zone: UTC+0 (WET)
  - Summer (DST): UTC-1 (IST (WEST))
- Irish Grid Reference: S456226
- Website: www.kilkennycoco.ie

Piltown (Irish: Baile an Phoill), historically known as Ballyfoyle, is a small town in County Kilkenny, Ireland. 5 km east of Carrick-on-Suir, it is on the R698 road and near the N24 national primary road.

Approaching Piltown from Carrick-on-Suir in the west is the landmark of "the Tower" (Sham Castle) which forms a roundabout in the road. This monument, dedicated to the son of a local landowner, dates back to the Napoleonic era. The son was enlisted in the War. During this time, he went missing, and he was presumed dead. His father instructed the tower be built in his honour. It was never completed, as the son returned during construction. Today, its upper section serves as a water tower.

Piltown is also home to Ireland's largest horticultural and agricultural college, Kildalton College. The college hosts a fair called the Iverk Show, named after the Barony of Iverk, on the fourth Saturday in August each year.

Piltown is a local electoral area of County Kilkenny and includes the electoral divisions of Aglish, Ballincrea, Brownsford, Castlegannon, Dunkitt, Dysartmoon, Farnoge, Fiddown, Jerpoint West, Kilbeacon, Kilbride, Kilcolumb, Kilculliheen, Kilkeasy, Killahy, Kilmakevoge, Listerlin, Muckalee, Piltown, Pollrone, Portnascully, Rathpatrick, Rosbercon Rural, Rossinan, Shanbogh, Templeorum, The Rower, Tubbrid, Ullid and Whitechurch.

== History ==
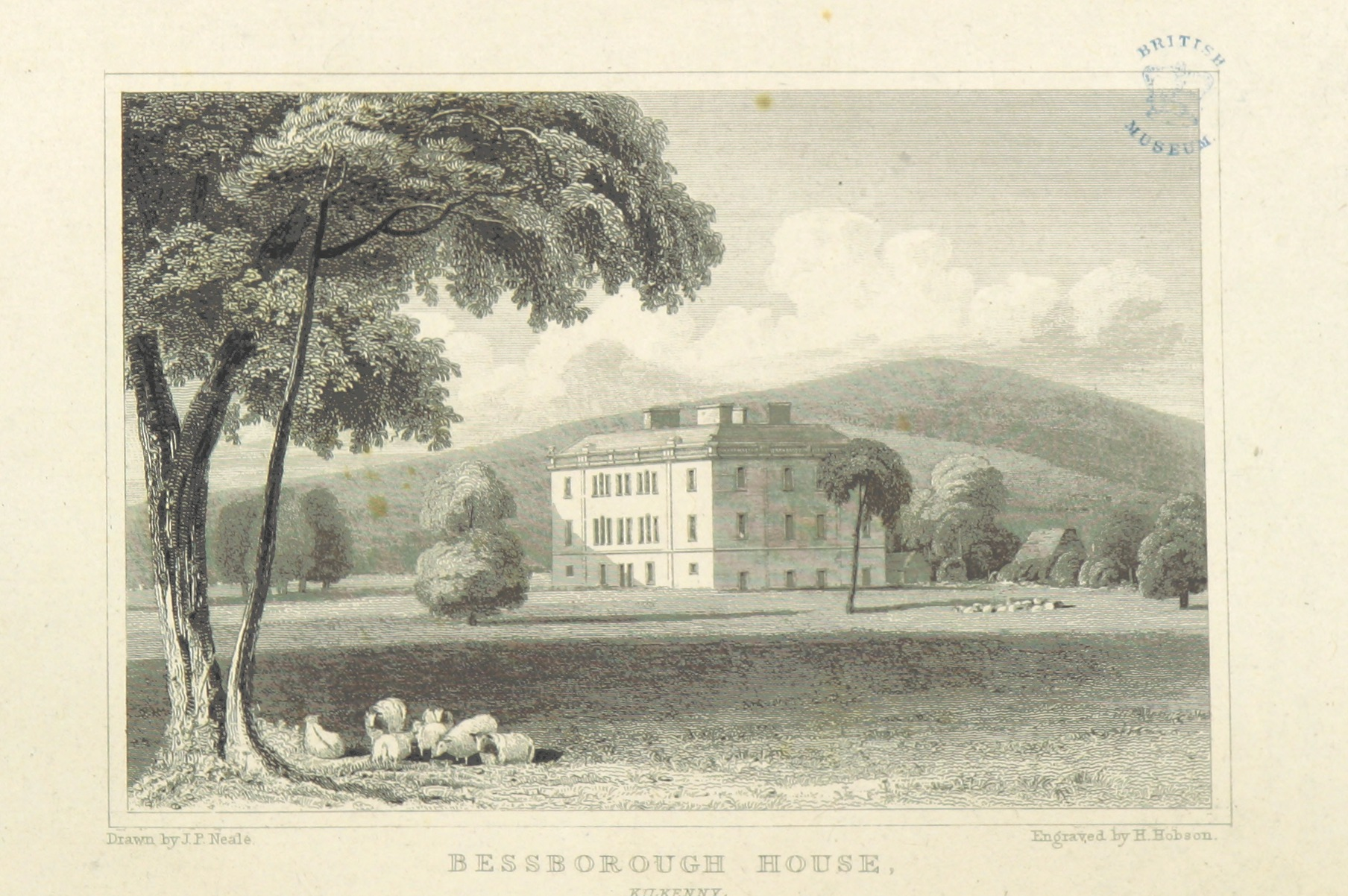
Bessborough House (as depicted in Views of the Seats of Noblemen and Gentlemen in England, Wales, Scotland and Ireland (1818) by John Preston Neale)

Piltown also has a unique place in English history as it was the only place on the island of Ireland to see a battle in the Wars of the Roses. In the Battle of Piltown (1462) Thomas FitzGerald, 7th Earl of Desmond, on the side of the House of York, defeated the Butlers of Kilkenny, fighting for the House of Lancaster, resulting in more than 400 casualties for the Butlers. Local folklore claims that the battle was so violent that the local river ran red with blood, hence the names Pill River and Piltown (Baile an Phuill - Town of the blood).

From the early eighteenth century up until the late 1930s, the main landlords in Piltown and its surrounding area were the Ponsonby dynasty, Earls of Bessborough. The family seat was Bessborough House, just outside Piltown, built in the 1740s for the 1st Earl. The house was gutted by fire in February 1923, during the Irish Civil War. However, it was rebuilt in the late 1920s for The 9th Earl of Bessborough, who served as the 14th Governor General of Canada in the early 1930s. The 9th Lord Bessborough sold the house in the late 1930s. Bessborough House now forms the main part of Kildalton Agricultural College.

== Education ==
Piltown is also home to one Ireland's largest horticultural and agricultural colleges, Kildalton College.

== Culture ==
Host to Ireland's longest-running agricultural show, called the Iverk Show, on the fourth Saturday in August each year. The Iverk Agricultural Show, started in 1826, was founded by a member of the Bessborough family. The family resided at Bessborough House, which is now Kildalton Agricultural College. This show has grown to become one of Ireland's largest one-day Agricultural and Family shows.

== Sport ==
Piltown GAA club was initially formed in 1887 and then reformed in 1953. The club played in two Senior County Finals in 1904 and 1910. The original grounds were purchased from the Land Commission in 1947. Piltown GAA club had one of its most successful years in 2003, winning the Southern Junior Hurling League (beating Tullogher Rosbercon), Southern Junior Hurling Championship (beating Tullogher Rosbercon), County Junior Hurling Championship (beating St. Patrick's Ballyragget after a replay), Leinster Junior Hurling Championship (beating St. Vincents of Dublin after extra-time) and were crowned AIB Kilkenny Club of the Year.

Piltown Camogie club are play at the Senior level of the championship, having won their first Intermediate county final in 2014. They followed up this victory with Leinster Intermediate and All-Ireland Intermediate titles beating Camross of County Laois and Lismore of County Waterford. They contested the Senior county final in 2018, 2019 and 2021, being narrowly defeated by Thomastown on a scoreline of 0–11 to 0–9 in 2018, Dicksboro by 1–7 to 0–8 in 2019, and by Dicksboro again 0–15 to 2–8 in 2021. The club has five players representing the Kilkenny senior camogie panel: goalkeeper Aoife Norris, back Kellyann Doyle, midfielder Laura Norris and forwards Aoife Doyle and Katie Power.

== Twin towns ==
Piltown is twinned with the village of Mellac in France.

== See also ==
- List of towns and villages in the Republic of Ireland
- Market Houses in the Republic of Ireland
