= Sysonby, Leicestershire =

Former hamlet in Leicestershire, England

Coordinates: 52.763°N 0.906°W

Sysonby
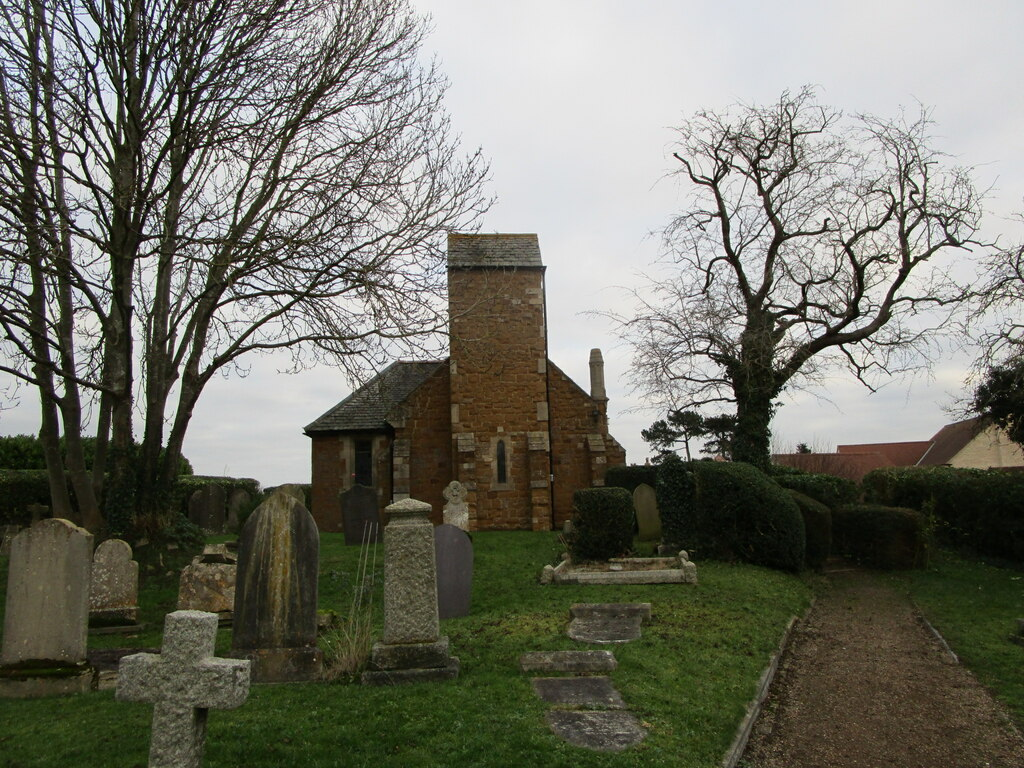
- St Leonard's church in 2021

- Location within Leicestershire
- District: Melton
- Shire county: Leicestershire
- Region: East Midlands
- Country: England
- Sovereign state: United Kingdom
- Police: Leicestershire
- Fire: Leicestershire
- Ambulance: East Midlands

Sysonby is a former hamlet and former civil parish in Leicestershire, England, about one mile west of Melton Mowbray and immediately west of the River Wreake.

The Domesday Book records Sysonby as being in Framland hundred with a population of 25 households.

Wilson's Imperial Gazetteer of England and Wales of 1870-1872 describes Sysonby:

SYSONBY, a chapelry in Melton-Mowbray parish, Leicester; 1 mile W of Melton-Mowbray r. station. Post town, Melton-Mowbray. Acres, 980. Real property, £1,920. Pop., 67. Houses, 11. The manor belongs to Earl Dysart. The living is annexed to Melton-Mowbray. The church is good.

The civil parish of Sysonby was abolished on 1 October 1930 and the area became part of the then parish of Melton Mowbray and its successor Melton Mowbray Urban District. In 1921 the parish had a population of 191. Since 1974 it has been in an unparished area of the Borough of Melton.

St Leonard's church, Sysonby, is a grade II listed building and is still used for occasional services. The Church of England's Church Heritage Record says "The church appears to be basically thirteenth-century in its present form", and it is locally thought to have been built around 1344, but Historic England dates it to the 15th or 16th century. There are ten graves under the care of the Commonwealth War Graves Commission. The church was previously incorrectly recorded in the NHLE as "Church of St Mary".

Melton Sysonby ward is a ward for elections to Melton Borough Council, but it is further north and does not include Sysonby. Sysonby Lodge is within that ward, near the A606 Nottingham Road, and is a grade II listed house, converted to apartments in the 2020s.

Nothing remains of the hamlet of Sysonby except its church: in the words of Historic England "the associated settlement has now vanished".

The American racehorse Sysonby was sired by Melton, winner of the 1885 Epsom Derby.

== See also ==
- Baron Ponsonby of Sysonby
- Baron Sysonby
