= Edward Ponsonby =

Edward Ponsonby may refer to:

- Edward Ponsonby, 8th Earl of Bessborough, British peer
- Edward Ponsonby, 2nd Baron Sysonby, British Army officer and peer
