= Edward Ponsonby, 2nd Baron Sysonby =

British Army officer and peer

Lieutenant Colonel The Right Honourable The Lord Sysonby DSO

Member of the House of Lords
- Lord Temporal
- In office 20 October 1935 – 21 January 1956
- Preceded by: The 1st Baron Sysonby
- Succeeded by: The 3rd Baron Sysonby

Personal details
- Born: Edward Gaspard Ponsonsby; 7 June 1903 England
- Died: 21 January 1956 (aged 52) Nairobi, Kenya
- Spouse: Sallie Sanford (m. 1936)
- Children: 2
- Parents: Frederick Ponsonby (father); Victoria Kennard (mother)
- Relatives: Loelia Lindsay (sister); Henry Ponsonby (grandfather); Edmund Kennard (grandfather)
- Military career
- Branch: British Army
- Rank: Lieutenant Colonel
- Units: West Surreys; 131st (Surrey) Infantry Brigade
- Wars: World War II

Lieutenant Colonel Edward Gaspard Ponsonsby, 2nd Baron Sysonby (7 June 1903 – 21 January 1956), was an officer of the British Army and a member of the House of Lords.

== Family ==
Edward Ponsonby was born in 1903, the only surviving son of Frederick Ponsonby, 1st Baron Sysonby, and the cookbook author Victoria "Ria" Sysonby (née Kennard).

The Ponsonby family has played a prominent role in British life for two centuries. In addition to his father's role as trusted adviser to three British monarchs, his grandfather was the Sir Henry Ponsonby, who was Private Secretary to Queen Victoria. His great-grandfather was badly wounded at the Battle of Waterloo, but survived to become General Sir Frederick Ponsonby. The father of the two siblings, Edward's great-great-grandfather, was the 3rd Earl of Bessborough. Edward's sister, Loelia, married the 2nd Duke of Westminster, before remarrying, after the Second World War, to become the alliterative Lady Loelia Lindsay.

Edward Ponsonby was educated at Eton College.

== Career ==
Ponsonby's father died in the year that he was granted a peerage and Edward became the 2nd Lord Sysonby in 1935.

On 2 October 1936, the Lord Sysonby married Sallie Whitney Sanford, the daughter of Dr. Leonard Cutler Sanford. There were two children from the marriage. A daughter, Hon. Carolyn Ponsonby, was born in 1938 (died 2023), but the long absences during the war years meant that it was not until 1945 that John, the sole heir to the title, was born.

When Lord Sysonby joined the British Army, he chose the local "county" regiment, the Queen's Royal Regiment (West Surrey), otherwise known as the West Surreys. He served initially in the Territorial Army, in the 5th Battalion, Queen's Royal Regiment, part of the 131st (Surrey) Infantry Brigade. During the Second World War, Lord Sysonby volunteered for the Commandos became a Commando officer and rose to the rank of Lieutenant Colonel. He was decorated with the Distinguished Service Order in 1940 during the Battle of France and retreat to Dunkirk where he was evacuated.

In 1948, Lord Sysonby and his young family emigrated to Africa, in search of a better life than that on offer in post-war Britain. Initially they moved to what was then called Southern Rhodesia, now Zimbabwe, but were unable to find a suitable home there and stayed only two years in the country. In 1950, the family moved on to Kenya and in this colony they were able to make a home. The family settled in Kitale in the uplands of Western Kenya, in the Rift Valley region, where Lord Sysonby hoped to make a living in farming. Unfortunately, he died only a few years later.

Lord Sysonby died in Nairobi on 21 January 1956, at the age of 52, and the title passed to his only son, John Ponsonby, 3rd Baron Sysonby. Lady Sysonby died in 1977.

When John died without issue in Wonersh, Surrey, in 2009, the title became extinct.

== Notes ==
Peerage of the United Kingdom
Preceded by Frederick Ponsonby	Baron Sysonby; 1935–1956; Member of the House of Lords (1935–1956)	Succeeded by John Ponsonby
