= Lady Lindsay =

Lady Lindsay may refer to:

- Joan Lindsay (1896–1984), Australian novelist, playwright, essayist, and visual artist.
- Loelia Lindsay (1902–1993), British socialite, needlewoman and magazine editor.
