= John Ponsonby, 1st Viscount Ponsonby =

Anglo-Irish diplomat, politician and peer

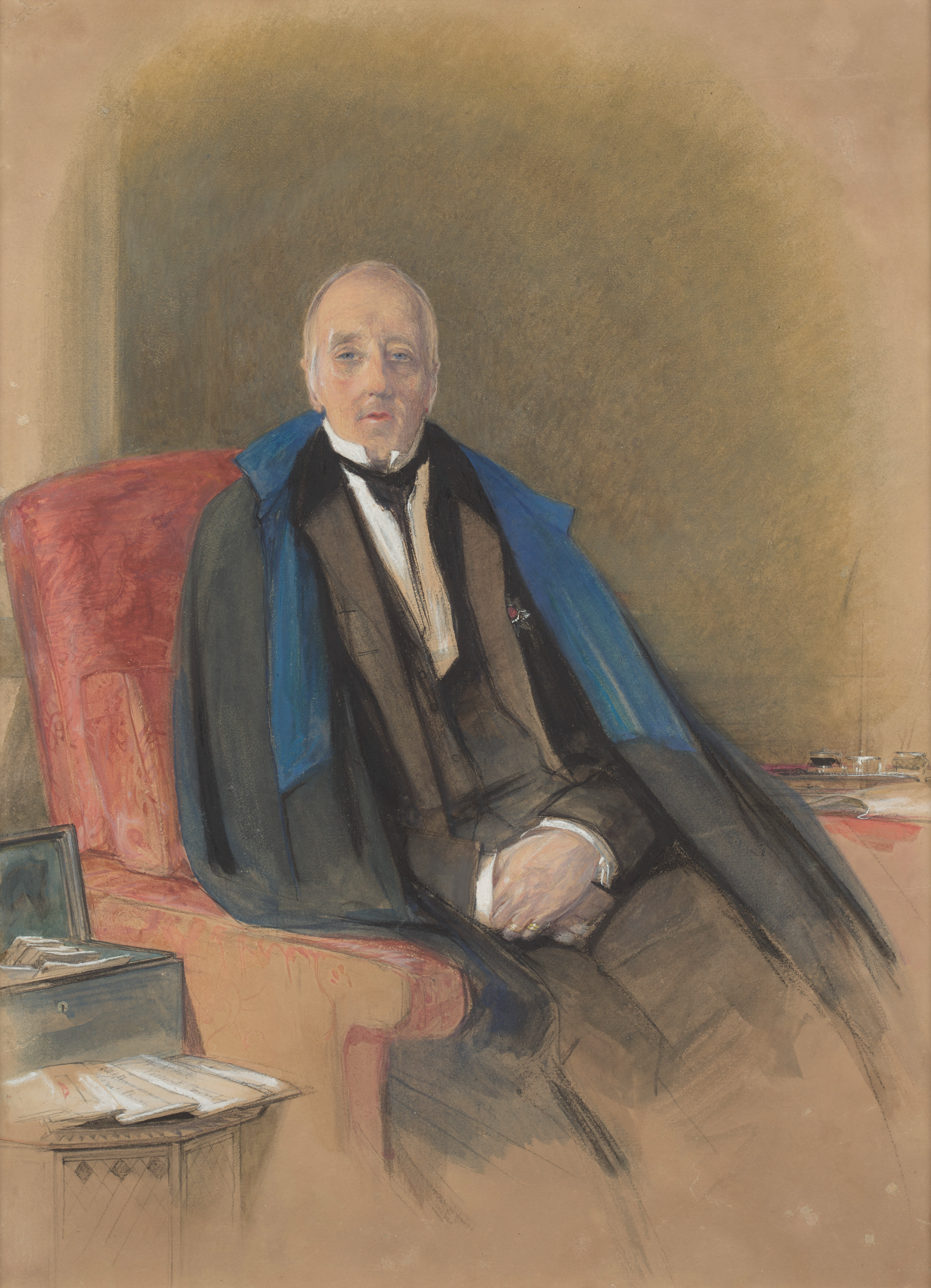
An 1840–41 portrait of Lord Ponsonby by John Frederick Lewis

John Brabazon Ponsonby, 1st Viscount Ponsonby, GCB (c. 1770 – 21 February 1855) was an Anglo-Irish diplomat, politician and peer.

== Political career ==
Ponsonby, born about 1770 in County Kilkenny, was the eldest son of William Ponsonby, 1st Baron Ponsonby, and Louisa Molesworth, and brother of Major-General Sir William Ponsonby. He served as a Member of Parliament (MP) in the Irish House of Commons for Tallow between 1793 and 1797. Elected in 1798 for both Banagher and Dungarvan, he chose to sit for the latter from 1798 to the Act of Union in 1800/01. He then represented Galway Borough in the House of Commons of the United Kingdom until 1802.

== Diplomatic career ==
On the death of his father on 5 November 1806, Ponsonby succeeded him as Baron Ponsonby, and for some time held an appointment in the Ionian Islands. On 28 February 1826, he went to Buenos Aires as envoy-extraordinary and minister-plenipotentiary until 1828, and moved then to Rio de Janeiro in the same capacity. An exceptionally handsome man, he was sent, it was reported, to South America by George Canning to please King George IV, who was envious of the attention paid him by Lady Conyngham. Once there he greatly fostered the independence of Uruguay as a buffer state between Argentina and Brazil, to the benefit of British commerce and overall peace. In December 1830 he was entrusted with a special mission to Belgium, in connection with the candidature of Prince Leopold of Saxe-Coburg to the Belgian throne, and remained in Brussels until Leopold was elected king on 4 June 1831. His dealings in this matter were adversely criticised in The Guet-à-Pens Diplomacy, or Lord Ponsonby at Brussels, … London, 1831, but the Prime Minister, Lord Grey, eulogised him in the House of Lords on 25 June 1831. Thus, as a diplomat, he was sent twice by the British Empire to promote the instauration of buffer states to protect its interests, Uruguay and Belgium, both of which survive to this very day, still deeply similar to their bigger neighbours. In addition to this, Ponsonby served as envoy to Naples from 8 June to 9 November 1832, as ambassador at Constantinople from 27 November 1832 to 1841, and as ambassador at Vienna from 10 August 1846 to 31 May 1850.

== Later life ==
Through Lord Grey, who had married his sister Mary Elizabeth, he had great influence, but his conduct as an ambassador sometimes caused official embarrassment, notably when he accompanied the emperor to Innsbruck in 1848. He was a keen diplomat of the "old school", a shrewd observer, and a man of large views and strong will. He was gazetted G.C.B. on 3 March 1834, and created Viscount Ponsonby, of Imokilly in the County of Cork, on 20 April 1839. He had previously married, on 13 January 1803, Lady Frances Villiers, seventh daughter of George Villiers, 4th Earl of Jersey. She died at 62 Chester Square, London, on 14 April 1866, having had no issue. Ponsonby published "Private Letters on the Eastern Question, written at the date thereon", Brighton, 1854, and died at Brighton on 21 February 1855. The viscountcy thereupon became extinct, but the barony devolved on his nephew William, son of Sir William Ponsonby.

Parliament of Ireland
Preceded by John Egan; Hugh Cane	Member of Parliament for Tallow; 1793–1798; With: John Egan	Succeeded by John Egan; John Metge
Preceded by Edward Hoare; John Metge	Member of Parliament for Banagher; 1797–1798; With: John Metge 1797–1798; Arthur Dawson 1798	Succeeded by John Metge; Arthur Dawson
Preceded by Marcus Beresford; Chambré Brabazon Ponsonby	Member of Parliament for Dungarvan; 1798–1801; With: Marcus Beresford 1798; Edward Lee 1798–1801	Succeeded by Parliament of the United Kingdom
Parliament of the United Kingdom
Preceded by St. George Daly	Member of Parliament for Galway Borough; 1801–1802	Succeeded by Denis Bowes Daly
Diplomatic posts
Preceded by Woodbine Parish	British Minister at Buenos Aires; 1826–1828	Succeeded by Woodbine Parish as Chargé d'Affaires
Preceded by Sir Robert Gordon	British Minister to Brazil; 1828–1832	Succeeded by Stephen Henry Fox
Preceded by William Noel Hill	British Minister at Naples; 1832–1833	Succeeded by Hon. William Temple
Vacant No diplomatic relations Title last held by Stratford Canning	British Ambassador to the Sublime Porte; 1833–1837	Succeeded by Sir Charles Richard Vaughan
Preceded by Sir Robert Gordon	British Ambassador to Austria; 1846–1850	Succeeded by The Earl of Westmorland
Peerage of the United Kingdom
New creation	Viscount Ponsonby; 1839–1855	Extinct
Preceded by William Ponsonby	Baron Ponsonby; 1806–1855	Succeeded by William Ponsonby
