= Frederick Ponsonby, 1st Baron Sysonby =

British soldier and courtier

Brevet Lieutenant Colonel The Right Honourable The Lord Sysonby GCB GCVO PC
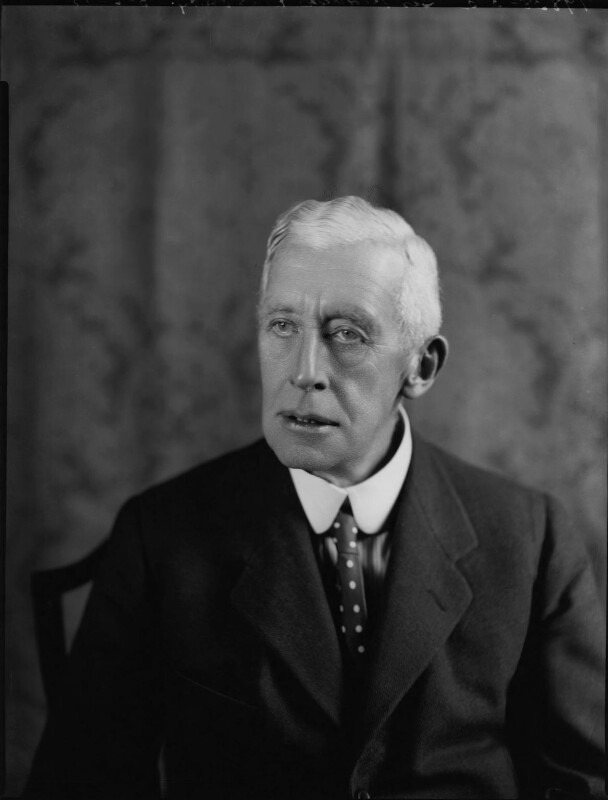
- Lord Sysonby, 1935

Keeper of the Privy Purse
- In office 1914–1935

Personal details
- Born: 16 September 1867
- Died: 20 October 1935 (aged 68) London, England
- Spouse: Victoria Kennard (m. 1899)
- Children: 3, including Loelia and Edward
- Parent: Henry Ponsonby (father)
- Relatives: John Ponsonby (brother); Arthur Ponsonby (brother); Frederick Ponsonby (grandfather)
- Military career
- Rank: Brevet Lieutenant-Colonel
- Units: Duke of Cornwall's Light Infantry; Grenadier Guards
- Wars: Second Boer War; World War I

Frederick Edward Grey Ponsonby, 1st Baron Sysonby (16 September 1867 – 20 October 1935), was a British soldier and courtier.

== Background ==
Known as Fritz, Ponsonby was the second of three sons of General Sir Henry Ponsonby and his wife the Hon. Mary Elizabeth Bulteel. A member of a junior branch of the Ponsonby family, he was the grandson of General Sir Frederick Ponsonby and the great-grandson of Frederick Ponsonby, 3rd Earl of Bessborough. Arthur Ponsonby, 1st Baron Ponsonby of Shulbrede, was his younger brother.

His godparents were German Emperor Frederick III and Empress Victoria.

== Military career ==
After attending Eton, Ponsonby received a commission in the Duke of Cornwall's Light Infantry as a second lieutenant. He transferred to the Grenadier Guards and was promoted to lieutenant on 2 July 1892. He was promoted to captain on 15 February 1899, and served with the 3rd Battalion of his regiment in the Second Boer War. Wounded at the end of the war, he returned to the United Kingdom in April 1902. He was later promoted to major and brevet lieutenant-colonel and served in the First World War. Sir John French mentioned him in despatches. He wrote the standard history: The Grenadier Guards in the Great War of 1914–1918. 3 vols., published in 1920.

== Courtier ==
He also held several court positions, notably as Equerry-in-Ordinary to Queen Victoria from 1894 to 1901, as Assistant Keeper of the Privy Purse and Assistant Private Secretary to Queen Victoria from 1897 to 1901, to King Edward VII from 1901 to 1910 and to King George V from 1910 to 1914; as Keeper of the Privy Purse from 1914 to 1935, and as Lieutenant Governor of Windsor Castle from 1928 to 1935.

In 1906, Ponsonby was appointed to the Order of the Bath as a Companion (CB). In 1910, he was promoted to be a Knight Commander of the Royal Victorian Order (KCVO) and was promoted to Knight Grand Cross (GCVO) in the 1921 New Year Honours. In 1913 he was made a Grand Cross in the Order of the Griffon of Mecklenburg-Strelitz. In 1914, he was sworn of the Privy Council. In the 1935 Birthday Honours, he was raised to the peerage as Baron Sysonby, of Wonersh in the County of Surrey.

== Family ==
Lord Sysonby married Victoria, daughter of Colonel Edmund Hegan Kennard, on 17 May 1899, at the Guards' Chapel, Wellington Barracks. She later became a well-known cookbook author. They had three children:

- Victor Alexander Henry Desmond Ponsonby (19 June 1900 – 24 November 1900)
- Hon. Loelia Mary Ponsonby (1902–1993)
- Hon. Edward Gaspard Ponsonby (1903–1956)

Lord Sysonby died in London in October 1935, aged 68, only four months after his elevation to the peerage, and was cremated at Golders Green Crematorium. He was succeeded in the barony by his surviving son Edward. Lady Sysonby, who died in 1955, was denied a pension by George V and was required to vacate St. James's Palace, where she had lived with her husband throughout their married life.

His autobiography Recollections of Three Reigns, edited and published posthumously in 1951, is full, frank and entertaining. Nancy Mitford wrote to Evelyn Waugh that there was "a shriek on every page". He also edited Letters of the Empress Frederick (1928) and published Sidelights on Queen Victoria (1930).

== Notes ==
Court offices
Preceded by Sir Fleetwood Edwards	Assistant Private Secretary to the Sovereign; 1895–1914	Succeeded by Sir Alexander Hardinge
Preceded by Sir William Carington	Keeper of the Privy Purse; 1914–1935	Succeeded by The Lord Wigram
Preceded by The Viscount Esher	Lieutenant-Governor of Windsor Castle; 1928–1935	Succeeded by The Lord Wigram
Peerage of the United Kingdom
New creation	Baron Sysonby; 1935	Succeeded by Edward Ponsonby
