= William Ponsonby, 1st Viscount Duncannon =

Anglo-Irish peer

William Ponsonby, 1st Viscount Duncannon (1659 – 17 November 1724), was an Anglo-Irish peer.

== Background ==
He was born in 1659, the third son of Sir John Ponsonby (c. 1608/9 – 1678) of Bessborough in County Kilkenny, a Cromwellian colonel of Horse in the Commonwealth service, and the third son by Sir John's second wife Elizabeth, widow of Richard Wingfield and of Edward Trevor, and daughter of Henry Folliott, 1st Baron Folliott.

He had two full siblings, Henry and Elizabeth, and two half-brothers. Folliott Wingfield, 1st Viscount Powerscourt, was his older half-brother on his mother's side. He also had an older half-brother, John, on his father's side.

Bessborough, formerly known as Kildalton, had been confiscated from Edmund Dalton, whose family had held it since the 13th century, for his part in the Irish Rebellion of 1641. It was granted to Sir John Ponsonby who renamed it after his second wife Elizabeth (Bess).

== Early life ==
William Ponsonby matriculated as a fellow-commoner at Trinity College Dublin, on 14 November 1677, at the age of eighteen. He succeeded his elder brother Sir Henry Ponsonby (eldest son of Sir John and Elizabeth) during the reign of King William III, and served as a colonel in the Army.

== Political career ==
Ponsonby sat in the Irish House of Commons for County Kilkenny from 1692 to 1693, from 1695 to 1699 and from 1703 to 1721; he was appointed a member of the Irish Privy Council on 11 November 1715. On 11 September 1721 he was created Baron Bessborough, of Bessborough, County Kilkenny, in the Peerage of Ireland, and took his seat in the Irish House of Lords on 23 September. He was further created Viscount Duncannon, of the fort of Duncannon, county Wexford, on 28 February 1723.

== Family ==
Ponsonby married Mary, daughter of the Hon. Randle Moore and granddaughter of Charles Moore, 2nd Viscount Drogheda, by whom he had nine children, three sons and six daughters. She died aged 51 on 26 May 1713, and he died on 17 November 1724, when he was succeeded by his eldest son Brabazon. Lord Duncannon and his wife are buried in the church at Fiddown.

Parliament of Ireland
Preceded by John Grace; Robert Walsh	Member of Parliament for County Kilkenny; 1692–1721; With: Richard Coote 1692–1693; Agmondisham Cuffe 1695–1699; Sir Henry Wemys 1703–1715; William Flower 1715–1721	Succeeded by William Flower; Patrick Wemyss
Peerage of Ireland
New creation	Viscount Duncannon; 1723–1724	Succeeded by Brabazon Ponsonby
New creation	Baron Bessborough; 1721–1724	Succeeded by Brabazon Ponsonby
