= Richard Ponsonby (bishop) =

Irish clergyman (1772–1853)

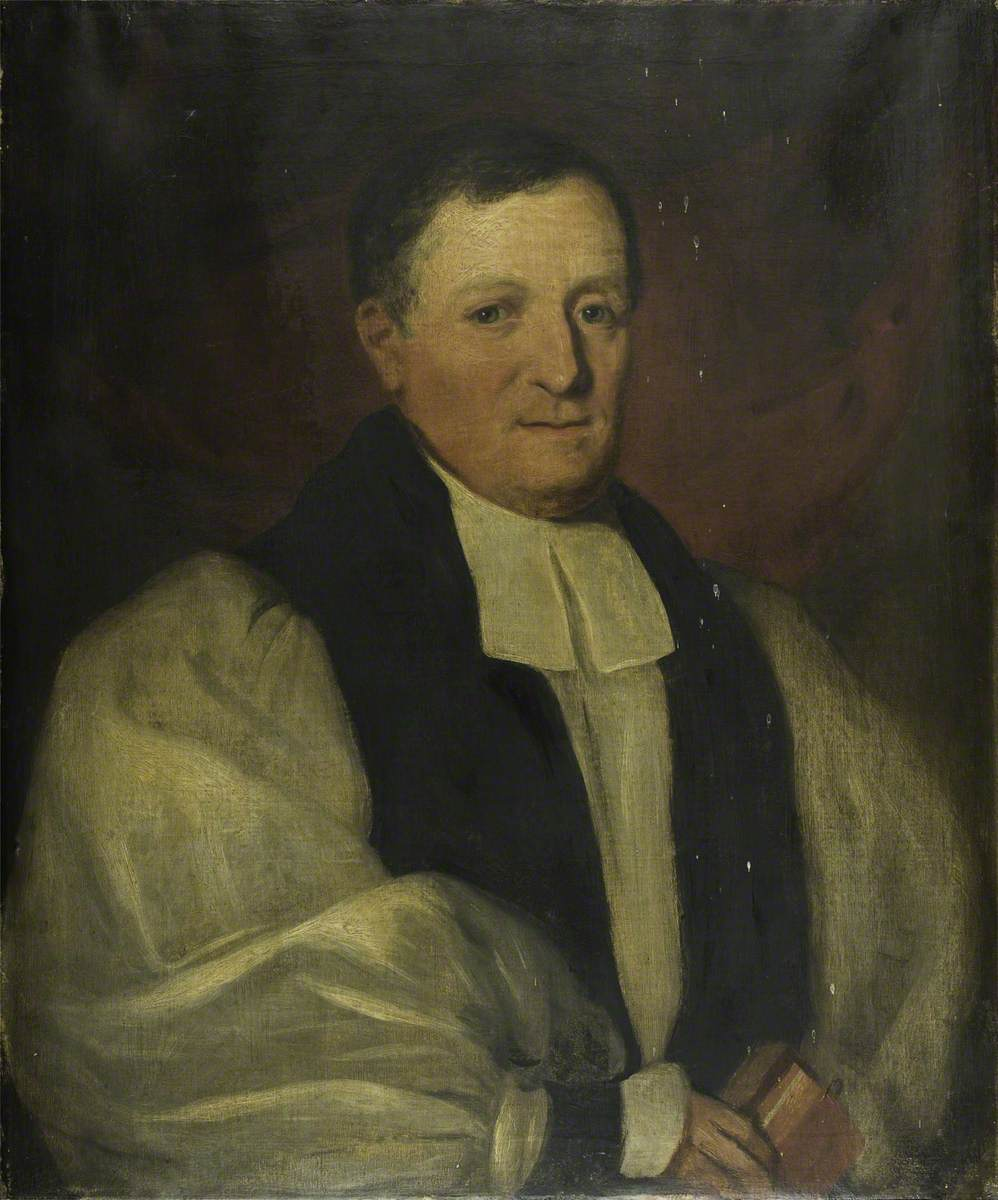
Richard Ponsonby

The Rt. Rev. and Hon. Richard Ponsonby (1772–1853) was an Irish clergyman who held high office in the Church of Ireland.

== Life ==
He was born at Dublin in 1772, the third son of William Ponsonby, 1st Baron Ponsonby of Imokilly and Louisa Molesworth. He was educated at Kilkenny College, and at Trinity College Dublin, where he graduated with a Bachelor of Arts in 1794, and Master of Arts in 1816.

During 1795, he was ordained deacon on 1 March and priest on 27 November, and was installed prebendary of Tipper in St. Patrick's Cathedral, Dublin on 2 December. He succeeded by patent to the precentorship of St. Patrick's on 25 July 1806, and dean on 3 June 1817. Ponsonby was elevated the episcopate when he was consecrated bishop of Killaloe and Kilfenora on 16 March 1828, and was translated to Derry on 21 September 1831. Under the Church Temporalities (Ireland) Act 1833 (3 & 4 Will. 4. c. 37), he became bishop of Derry and Raphoe on 5 September 1834 when the two dioceses were united. He was president of the Church Education Society, and died at the Episcopal palace in Derry on 27 October 1853.

== Family ==
He married, in 1804, his cousin Frances, second daughter of The Rt Hon. John Staples, MP for Antrim and Privy Councillor, and his second wife Henrietta Molesworth, daughter of Richard Molesworth, 3rd Viscount Molesworth and Mary Ussher. She died on 15 December 1858, having had a son, William Brabazon, fourth and last Baron Ponsonby of Imokilly, who died on board his yacht, the Lufra, off Plymouth, on 10 September 1866.

The couple also has four daughters, Harriet, Elizabeth, Frances and Emily. Frances and Emily kept an interesting joint diary, of which the surviving fragments were published in the 1970s, recording their impressions of County Donegal in 1837, when they accompanied their father on his visit. Harriet married the Reverend Thomas Lindesay, Rector of Tamlaght. Emily married the Reverend Charlton Maxwell, Rector of Leckpatrick, and had issue. Elizabeth married Simon Purdon, of the well-known landowning family of Tinerana, County Clare. They were the parents of Commander George Purdon, RN, and the great-grandparents of the British Conservative politician James Thomas, 1st Viscount Cilcennin.

Church of Ireland titles
Preceded by John William Keatinge	Dean of St. Patrick's Cathedral, Dublin; 1818–1828	Succeeded by Henry Richard Dawson
Preceded by Alexander Arbuthnot	Bishop of Killaloe and Kilfenora; 1828–1831	Succeeded by Edmund Knox
Preceded by William Knox	Bishop of Derry; 1831–1834	Succeeded by Last separate bishop of the diocese
Preceded by First bishop of the united diocese	Bishop of Derry and Raphoe; 1834–1853	Succeeded by William Higgin
