= Edmund Butler, 11th Viscount Mountgarret =

Irish peer and politician (1745–1793)

Edmund Butler, 11th Viscount Mountgarret (27 July 1745 – 16 July 1793) was an Irish peer and politician.

He was the son of Edmund Butler, 10th Viscount Mountgarret and Charlotte Bradstreet, daughter of Sir Simon Bradstreet, 1st Bart. He married Henrietta Butler, daughter of Somerset Hamilton Butler, 1st Earl of Carrick on 7 October 1768 and had issue. He was a member of parliament (MP) in the Irish House of Commons for County Kilkenny from 1776 to 1779.

== Marriage and Children ==
Lord Mountgarret and his wife Henrietta Butler had five children:

- Edmund Butler, 12th Viscount Mountgarret (1771–1846), married Mildred Fowler, daughter of Robert Fowler, Archbishop of Dublin, they had no children.
- Hon. Somerset Richard Butler (1771–1826), married Jane French, daughter of Arthur French. They had no children.
- Hon. Henry Butler (1773–1842), married Anne Harrison, daughter of John Harrison and had issue. Father of the 13th Viscount
- Colonel Hon. Pierce Butler (1774–1846) MP, married Anne March, daughter of Thomas March, had issue
- Hon. Charlotte Juliana Butler (died 26 October 1830), married Colonel John Carrington Smith

Parliament of Ireland
Preceded by Hon. John Ponsonby; James Agar	Member of Parliament for County Kilkenny; 1776–1779; With: Hon. John Ponsonby	Succeeded by Hon. John Ponsonby; Joseph Deane
Peerage of Ireland
Preceded by Edmund Butler	Viscount Mountgarret; 1779–1793	Succeeded by Edmund Butler
