= Agmondisham Cuffe =

Irish politician

Agmondisham Cuffe was an Irish politician.

Cuffe was educated at Trinity College Dublin.

Cuffe represented County Kilkenny from 1698 to 1699. He died in December 1717.
