= Bishopscourt, County Kildare =

Bishopscourt
- Townland
- Location in Ireland
- Coordinates: 53°18′N 6°30′W
- Country: Ireland
- Province: Leinster
- County: County Kildare
- Elevation: 61 m (200 ft)
- Time zone: UTC+0 (WET)
  - Summer (DST): UTC-1 (IST (WEST))

Bishopscourt is a townland in County Kildare, Ireland, near Kill, Ardclough and Straffan and beside the N7 road. The Bishopscourt estate, the main estate house for which was known as Bishopscourt House or Bishops Court House, was once held by the Bishops of Kildare.

== History ==
=== Calendar and historical references ===
In 1527, Thomas, Bishop of Kildare, granted Bishopscourt to Piers Butler, 8th Earl of Ormond, and his wife Margaret. In 1537 it passed to John Alen, Lord Chancellor of Ireland. In 1676 it passed to John Margetson, later to die at the Siege of Limerick in 1690 fighting for William of Orange. His daughter married Brabazon Ponsonby, recorded in folklore as a fortune hunter.

=== Ponsonby family ===
The Ponsonby family became the most powerful political dynasty in 17th century Ireland. John Ponsonby was speaker of the Irish House of Commons (1753–1761), and William Ponsonby was leader of the Irish Whigs (1789–1803) and birthplace of his brother George Ponsonby (1755–1817) leader of the Whig Party in the British House of Commons at Westminster (1808–1817), his uncle Major-General Sir William Ponsonby (1772–1815) whose inept charge at the Battle of Waterloo resulted in his death at the hands of the Polish Lanciers and was studied as an example of failed battle strategy for generations afterwards, and of his sister Mary Ponsonby, wife of The 2nd Earl Grey, British Prime Minister from 1830 to 1834 and best known nowadays as the Earl Grey of the tea brand.

=== House ===
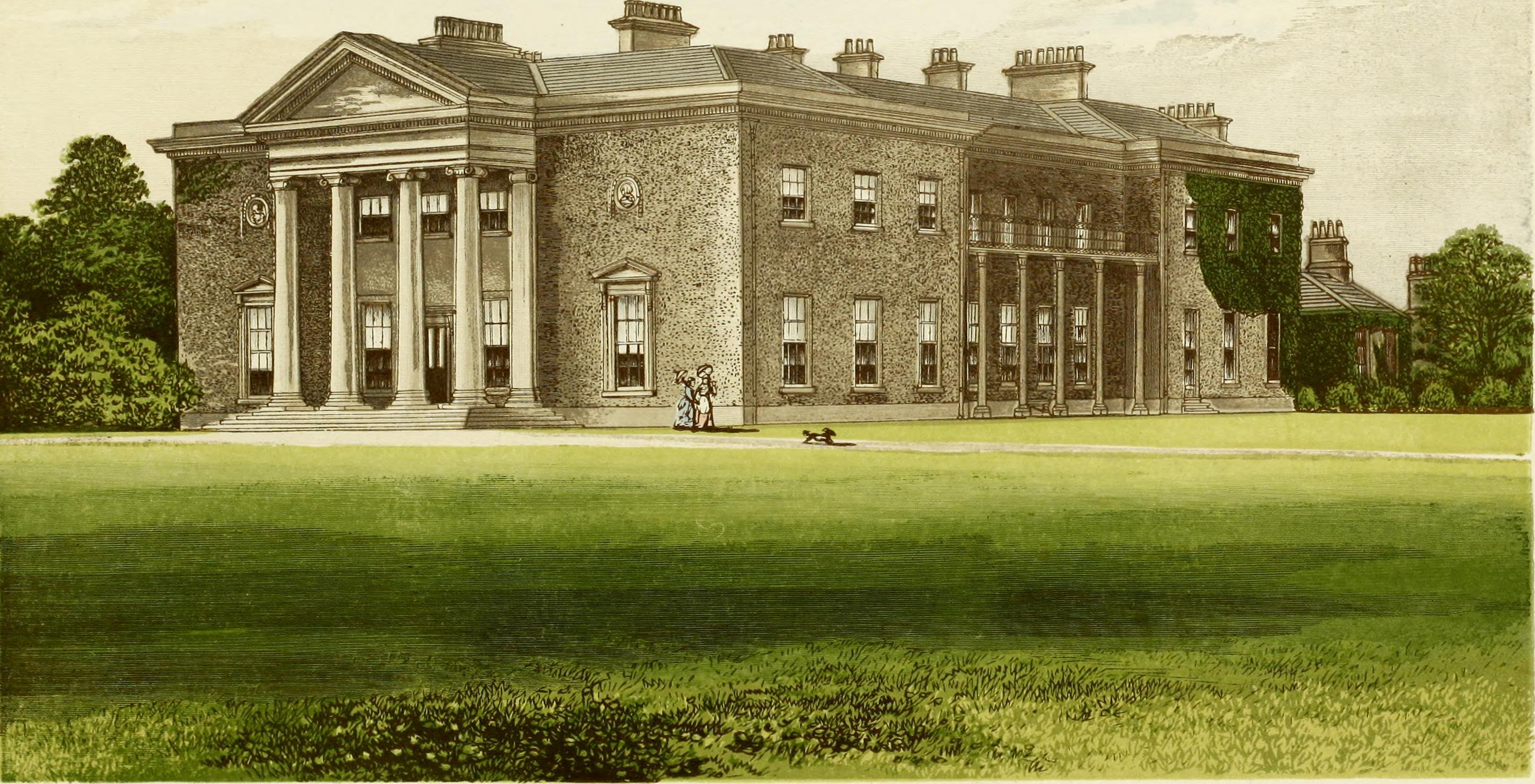
Bishopscourt House in 1879, from The County Seats of the Noblemen and Gentlemen of Great Britain and Ireland, by Francis Orpen Morris.

The fabric of the house at Bishopscourt was reconstructed to the design of Sir Richard Morrison in 1790. It was on the grounds of the estate that Daniel O'Connell fought a duel with John d'Esterre on 1 February 1815. Subsequently, the house burnt down in the 1950s and was rebuilt.

At the walled west corner of the estate is a small blue door, and the adjacent road junction on the Straffan-Kill road is referred to as the Blue Door.

In 1838, Bishopscourt was sold by Frederick Ponsonby to John Henry Scott, the 3rd Earl of Clonmell, and in 1914 sold on to Edward Kennedy from Baronrath, at the time one of the most famous breeders of racehorses in Ireland. Kennedy's stallion The Tetrarch, standing at Bishopscourt, was the most successful sire in the world in 1919. In 1938 the house passed to Edward's daughter Patricia (Tiggie) Kennedy and her husband, Dermot McGillycuddy, heir to Senator McGillycuddy of the Reeks, an ancient clan chiefdom from County Kerry. Edward Kennedy's son Major DM (John) Kennedy won an MC at Anzio whilst serving with 1st Battalion Irish Guards and was later killed at Terporten Castle in Germany in February 1945.

Bishopscourt house is now home to the Farrell family.

== Notable people ==
- Charles FitzClarence, recipient of the Victoria Cross

== Bibliography ==
- Tony Carr: Time to Kill: Memories of Kill Village (2004)
- Eoghan Corry and Jim Tancred: The Annals of Ardclough (2004).
- Journal of the Kildare Archaeological Society, Volume II : 278. Volume III : 489. Volume IV : 114, 240. Volume V : 214. Volume VI : 479. Volume XII : 340. Volume XVII : 35.
- Bishopscourt by James Fleming, published 31 October 1936 in the Weekly Irish Times
