= Loelia Lindsay =

British magazine editor and needlewoman

The Honourable Lady Lindsay
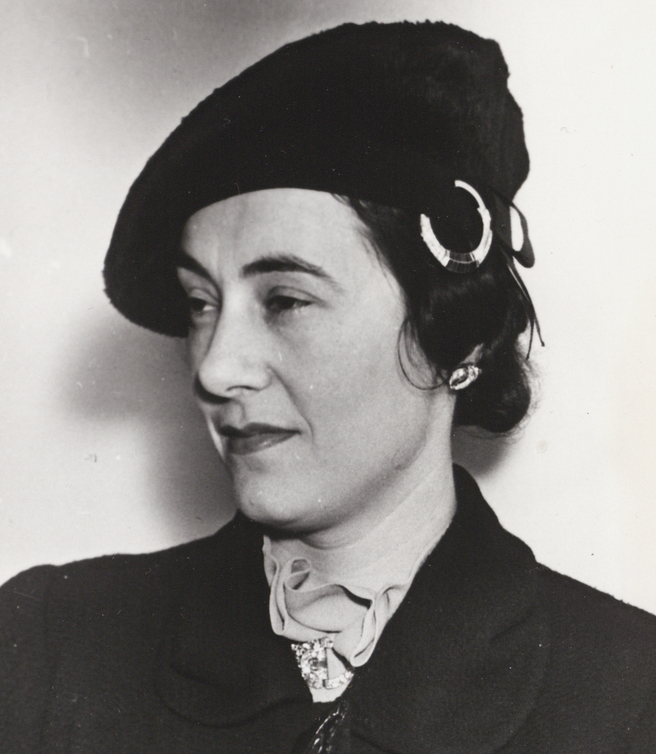

Personal details
- Born: Loelia Mary Ponsonby; 6 February 1902
- Died: 1 November 1993 (aged 91)
- Spouse(s): Hugh Grosvenor, 2nd Duke of Westminster (m. 1930; div. 1947) Sir Martin Lindsay, 1st Baronet (m. 1969)
- Parent(s): Frederick Ponsonby, 1st Baron Sysonby; Victoria Kennard
- Occupation: embroiderer, socialite, magazine editor

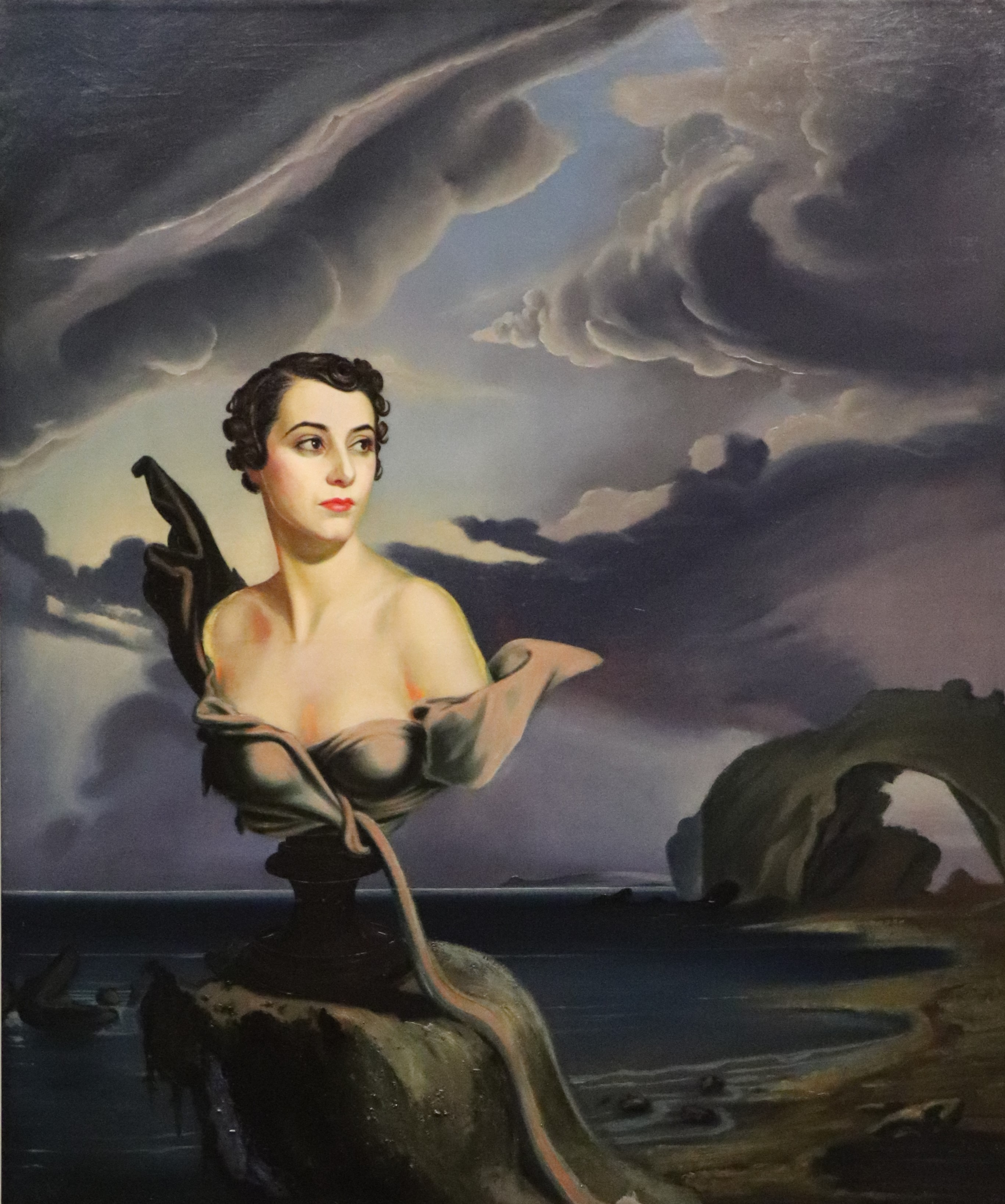
Loelia, Duchess of Westminster, by William Acton

Loelia Mary, Lady Lindsay, formerly Loelia Grosvenor, Duchess of Westminster, (née Ponsonby; 6 February 1902 – 1 November 1993), was a British socialite, needlewoman and magazine editor.

== Family and first marriage ==
Lindsay was the only daughter of the courtier Sir Frederick Ponsonby, later 1st Baron Sysonby, and the cookbook author Victoria Ponsonby (née Kennard). She spent her early years at St James's Palace, Park House at Sandringham, and Birkhall. One of the Bright Young People, she met the twice-divorced, 22-years senior, Hugh Grosvenor, 2nd Duke of Westminster. They were married on 20 February 1930 in a blaze of publicity, with Winston Churchill as the best man, but were unable to have children. Her marriage to the enormously wealthy peer was described by James Lees-Milne as "a definition of unadulterated hell". It was dissolved in 1947 after years of separation.

== Life after divorce ==
After her divorce, Loelia, Duchess of Westminster, established herself as a skilful hostess at Send, Surrey, occupying herself with needlework and gardening, passions she had inherited from her mother. Her needlework collection was bequeathed to the National Trust. During the 1950s she worked as a feature editor for House & Garden magazine, and covered the wedding of Prince Rainier III of Monaco and Grace Kelly.

Lindsay is believed to have popularised the aphorism (falsely attributed to Margaret Thatcher): "Anybody seen in a bus over the age of 30 has been a failure in life", which appears to have been coined by poet Brian Howard.

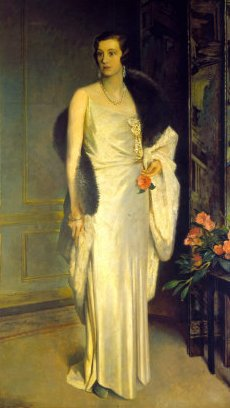
The Duchess of Westminster by Glyn Philpot

Lindsay's second marriage, to the divorced explorer Sir Martin Lindsay, 1st Baronet, came as a surprise to her friends but was more successful. The couple married on 1 August 1969. Sir Martin, a devoted husband, died in 1981, and Lady Lindsay chose to spend her last years in nursing homes. Her memoirs, written in 1961 and titled Grace and Favour: The Memoirs of Loelia, Duchess of Westminster, are a significant record of aristocratic life between the First and Second World Wars.
