= William Ponsonby, 2nd Earl of Bessborough =

Anglo-Irish politician (1704–1793)

The Right Honourable The Earl of Bessborough
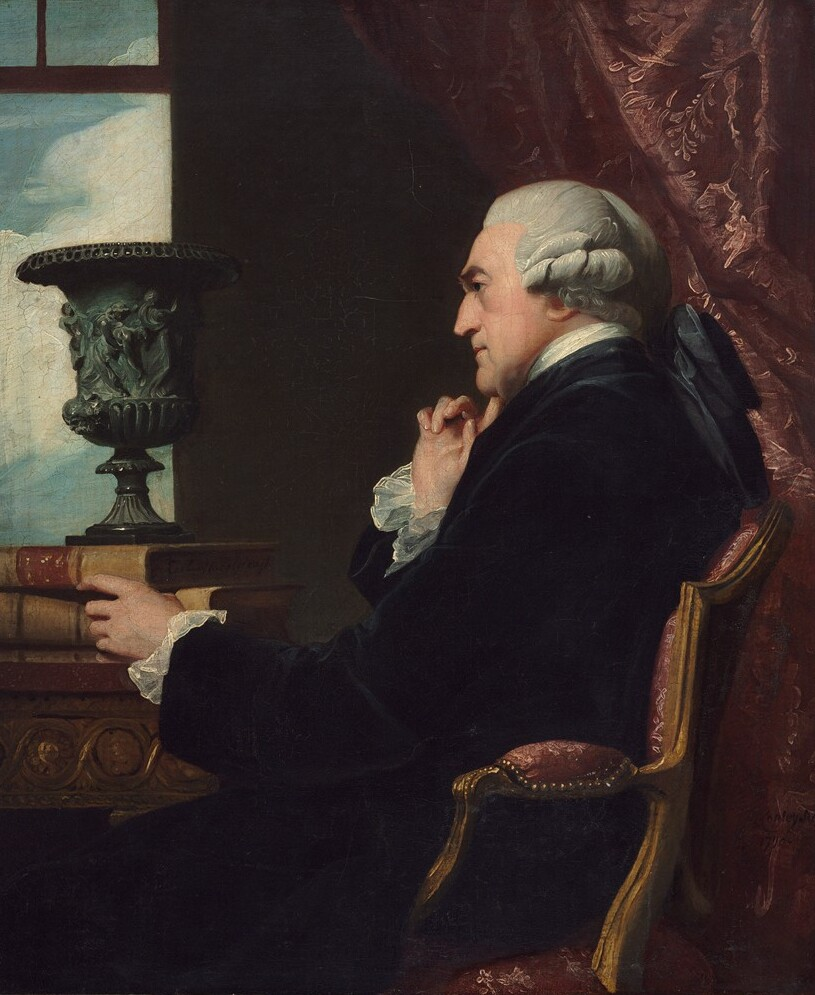
- Portrait by John Singleton Copley, 1790
- Born: 1704
- Died: 11 March 1793 (aged 88–89)
- Spouse: Caroline Cavendish
- Children: Catherine Beauclerk, Duchess of St Albans; Charlotte Fitzwilliam, Countess Fitzwilliam; Frederick Ponsonby, 3rd Earl of Bessborough
- Parents: Brabazon Ponsonby, 1st Earl of Bessborough (father); Sarah Margetson (mother)

William Ponsonby, 2nd Earl of Bessborough PC PC (Ire) (1704 – 11 March 1793) was an Anglo-Irish politician. He was an Irish and English peer and member of the House of Lords (styled Hon. William Ponsonby from 1723 to 1739 and Viscount Duncannon from 1739 to 1758). He served in both the Irish and the British House of Commons, before entering the House of Lords, and held office as a Lord Commissioner of the Admiralty, Lord Commissioner of the Treasury, and as Postmaster General of the United Kingdom. He was also a Privy Counsellor, Chief Secretary for Ireland and Earl of Bessborough.

== Education ==
Ponsonby was educated at Trinity College Dublin.

== Political life ==
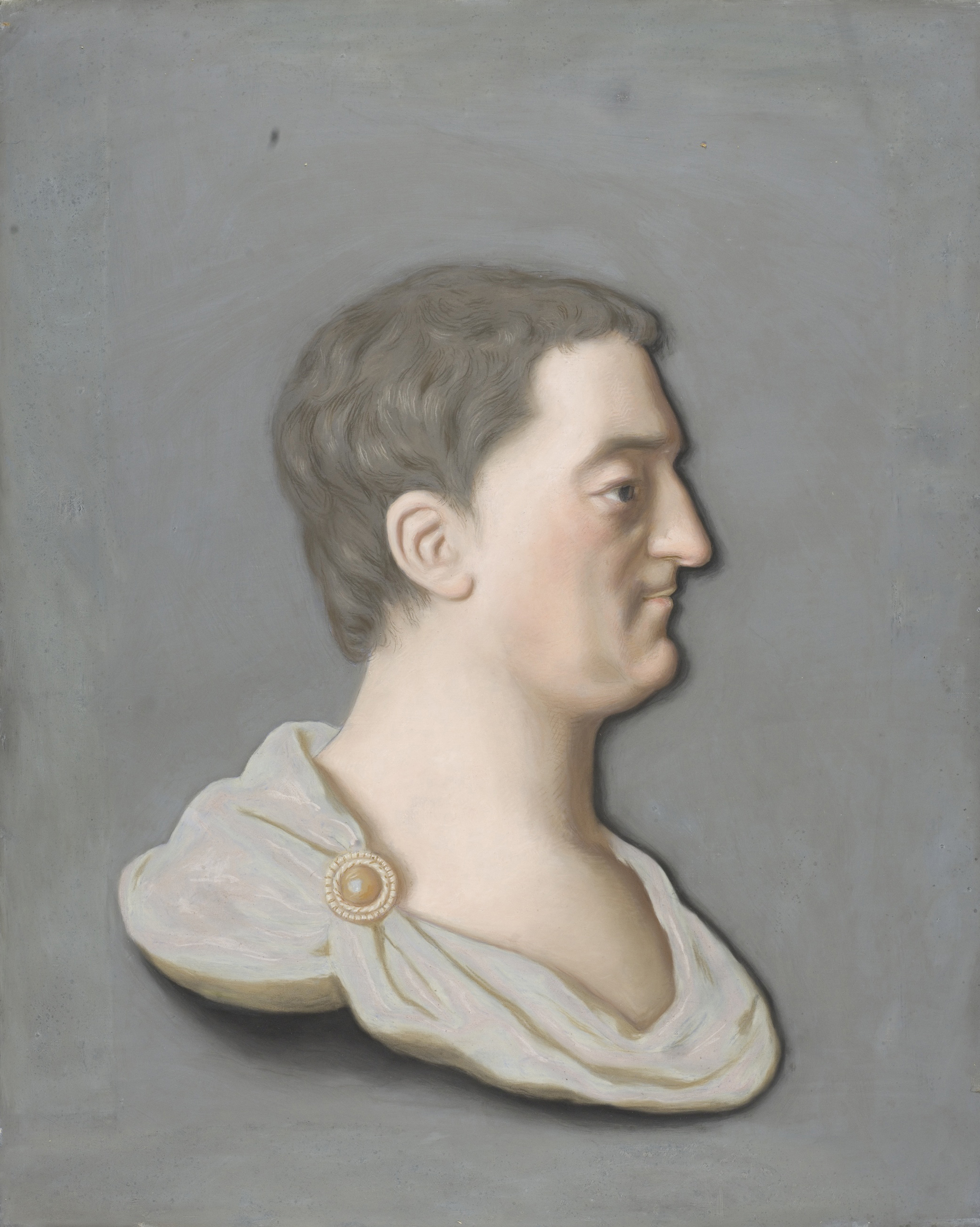
Sir William Ponsonby pastel by Jean-Étienne Liotard

In 1725 Ponsonby was returned to the Irish House of Commons for Newtownards and in 1727 for County Kilkenny, holding the seat until 1758, when his father died and he took his father's titles. From 1741 to 1745, he served as Chief Secretary for Ireland under his father-in-law, then Lord Lieutenant of Ireland.

As Viscount Duncannon, Ponsonby was first appointed a Lord Commissioner of the Admiralty on 27 June 1746, a position he held until 1756, when he was appointed a Lord Commissioner of the Treasury. He also represented the British constituencies of Derby from 1742 to 1754, Saltash from 1754 to 1756 and Harwick from 1756 to 1758. Upon the death of his father on 4 July 1758, Ponsonby succeeded him in the House of Lords under the title Baron Ponsonby of Sysonby on 23 November of that year.

=== Postmaster General ===
On 2 June 1759 Ponsonby left the Treasury and was appointed Postmaster General of Great Britain jointly with Robert Hampden-Trevor, 1st Viscount Hampden. He resigned the position when his brother-in-law, William Cavendish, 4th Duke of Devonshire, was dismissed as Lord Chamberlain in October 1762. He was reappointed to the position (and sworn of the Privy Council) in July 1765 jointly with Thomas Robinson, 1st Baron Grantham, until he resigned in 1766, his initial offer to resign having been refused.

Upon William Ponsonby's death on 11 March 1793 his son, Frederick Ponsonby, succeeded to his titles.

== Family ==
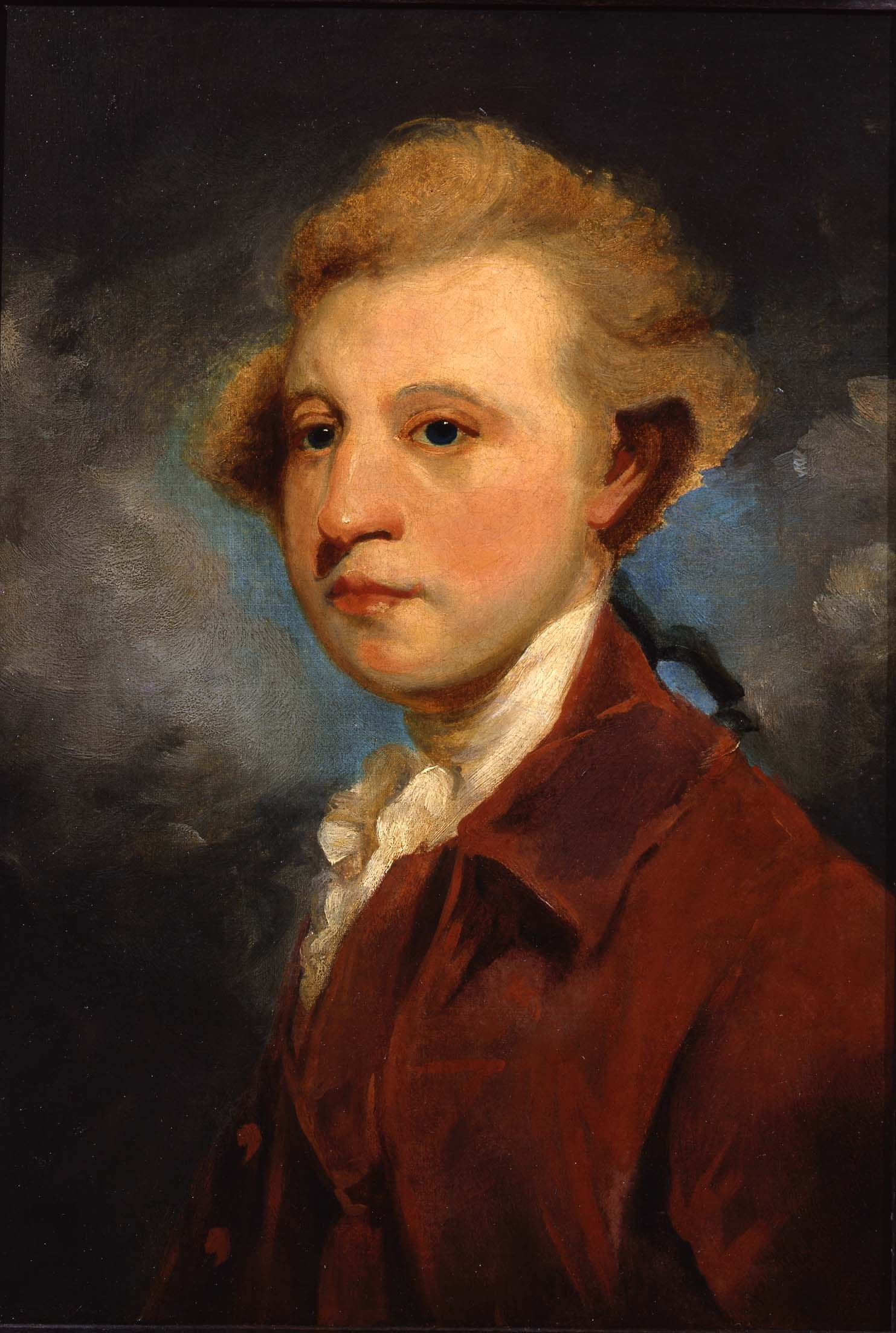
1760 portrait of Bessborough by Sir Joshua Reynolds

William Ponsonby was the son of Brabazon Ponsonby, 1st Earl of Bessborough, and his wife Sarah Margetson, and elder brother of John Ponsonby.

On 5 July 1739, William married Lady Caroline Cavendish, eldest daughter of William Cavendish, 3rd Duke of Devonshire, who died in 1760 aged 40.

They had three surviving children:

- Lady Catherine Ponsonby (b. 1742), married Aubrey Beauclerk, 5th Duke of St Albans
- Lady Charlotte Ponsonby (b. 1747), married William Fitzwilliam, 4th Earl Fitzwilliam
- Frederick Ponsonby, 3rd Earl of Bessborough (1758–1844)

Parkstead House, Roehampton, was built in 1750 for William Ponsonby, and now forms part of Roehampton University.

== Arms ==
Coat of arms of William Ponsonby, 2nd Earl of Bessborough
Crest Out of a ducal coronet Azure three arrows one in pale and two in saltire points downward entwined by a snake Proper. Escutcheon Gules a chevron between three combs Argent. Supporters On either side a lion reguardant Proper. Motto Pro Rege Lege Grege (For king, law and people).

Parliament of Ireland
Preceded by Charles Campbell; Richard Tighe	Member of Parliament for Newtownards; 1725–1727; With: Richard Tighe	Succeeded by John Vesey; Robert Jocelyn
Preceded by William Flower; Patrick Wemyss	Member of Parliament for County Kilkenny; 1727–1758; With: Patrick Wemyss 1727–1747; Patrick Wemys 1747–1758	Succeeded by Patrick Wemys; Henry Flood
Parliament of Great Britain
Preceded by Lord James Cavendish; John Stanhope	Member of Parliament for Derby; 1742–1754; With: John Stanhope 1742–1748; Thomas Rivett 1748–1754	Succeeded by Lord Frederick Cavendish; George Venables-Vernon
Preceded by Stamp Brooksbank; George Brydges Rodney	Member of Parliament for Saltash; 1754–1756; With: George Clinton	Succeeded by George Clinton; Charles Townshend
Preceded by John Phillipson; Wenman Coke	Member of Parliament for Harwich; 1756–1758; With: Wenman Coke	Succeeded by Wenman Coke; Thomas Sewell
Political offices
Preceded by Hon. Henry Bilson-Legge	Chief Secretary for Ireland; 1741–1745	Succeeded by Richard Liddell
Preceded by The Earl of Leicester; Everard Fawkener	Postmaster General of Great Britain; 1759–1762; With: The Lord Trevor	Succeeded by The Lord Trevor; The Earl of Egmont
Preceded by The Lord Trevor; The Lord Hyde	Postmaster General of Great Britain; 1765–1766; With: The Lord Grantham	Succeeded by The Viscount Hillsborough; The Lord le Despencer
Peerage of Ireland
Preceded by Brabazon Ponsonby	Earl of Bessborough; 1758–1793	Succeeded by Frederick Ponsonby
Preceded by Brabazon Ponsonby	Viscount Duncannon; 1758–1793	Succeeded by Frederick Ponsonby
Preceded by Brabazon Ponsonby	Baron Bessborough; 1758–1793	Succeeded by Frederick Ponsonby
Peerage of Great Britain
Preceded by Brabazon Ponsonby	Baron Ponsonby of Sysonby; 1758–1793; Member of the House of Lords (1758–1793)	Succeeded by Frederick Ponsonby
