= County Kilkenny (Parliament of Ireland constituency) =

Pre-1801 Irish constituency

- Former county constituency for the Irish House of Commons
- County: County Kilkenny

–1801
- Seats: 2
- Replaced by: County Kilkenny (UKHC)

County Kilkenny was a constituency represented in the Irish House of Commons until 1800.

== History ==
In the Patriot Parliament of 1689 summoned by James II, County Kilkenny was represented with two members.

== Members of Parliament ==
- 1376: Alexander de Balscot, Bishop of Ossory (replaced by Walter, son of William Coterelle of Kenlys) and Godfrey Forstall were elected to come to England to consult with the king and council about the government of Ireland and about an aid for the king.
- 1531 Rowland Fitzgerald, 2nd Baron of Burnchurch citing, citing
- 1559 Nicholas White and Walter Gall
- 1585 Gerard Blancheville and Robert Rothe
- 1613–1615 Lucas Shee and Robert Grace, Baron of Courtown
- 1634–1635 Robert Grace, Baron of Courtown and Edmund Butler of Polestown
- 1639–1649 Pierce Butler (expelled) and Walter Walsh
- 1661–1666 Sir John Ponsonby and Colonel Daniel Redman

=== 1689–1801 ===
Election	First MP		Second MP	
1689	John Grace		Robert Walsh	
1692	Richard Coote		William Ponsonby	
1695	Agmondisham Cuffe		William Ponsonby	
1703	Sir Henry Wemys		William Ponsonby	
1715	William Flower		William Ponsonby	
1721	William Flower		Patrick Wemyss	
1727	Hon. William Ponsonby (Note: Styled as Viscount Duncannon from 1739)		Patrick Wemyss	
1747	Hon. William Ponsonby		Patrick Wemys	
1759	Henry Flood	Patriot	Patrick Wemys	
1761	Hon. John Ponsonby	Patriot	James Agar	
1776	Hon. John Ponsonby	Patriot	Hon. Edmund Butler	
1779	Hon. John Ponsonby	Patriot	Joseph Deane	
1783	William Brabazon Ponsonby	Patriot (to 1789) Irish Whig (from 1789)	Hon. Henry Welbore Agar	Patriot/Irish Whig
1790	William Brabazon Ponsonby	Patriot (to 1789) Irish Whig (from 1789)	Walter Butler (Note: Styled as Viscount Thurles from 1792)	
February 1796	William Brabazon Ponsonby	Patriot (to 1789) Irish Whig (from 1789)	Hon. John Wandesford Butler	
1797	William Brabazon Ponsonby	Patriot (to 1789) Irish Whig (from 1789)	Hon. James Wandesford Butler	Irish Whig
1801	Succeeded by the Westminster constituency County Kilkenny			

== Bibliography ==
- O'Hart, John (2007). The Irish and Anglo-Irish Landed Gentry: When Cromwell came to Ireland. Vol. II. Heritage Books. ISBN 978-0-7884-1927-0.
- Leigh Rayment's historical List of Members of the Irish House of Commons. Cites: Johnston-Liik, Edith Mary (2002). The History of the Irish Parliament 1692-1800 (6 volumes). Ulster Historical Foundation.
- Clarke, Maude V. (1932–34). "William of Windsor in Ireland, 1369-1376". Proceedings of the Royal Irish Academy: Archaeology, Culture, History, Literature. 41: 55–130. JSTOR 25515963.
