= Mary Grey, Countess Grey =

British aristocrat and wife of Charles Grey, 2nd Earl Grey

The Right Honourable The Countess Grey
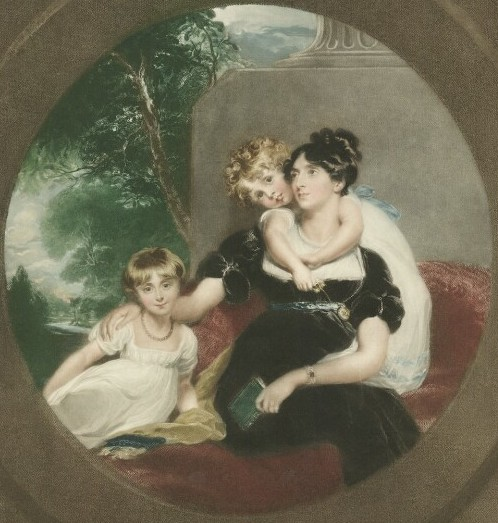
- Countess Grey with her children Caroline and Georgiana, in a print after Sir Thomas Lawrence, 1831
- Born: Mary Elizabeth Ponsonby; 4 March 1776; Whitehaven
- Died: 26 November 1861 (aged 85); Eaton Square, London
- Known for: Spouse of the prime minister of the United Kingdom (1830–1834)
- Spouse: Charles Grey, 2nd Earl Grey (m. 1794; died 1845)
- Children: 15, including Henry, Charles, and Frederick
- Parents: Lord Ponsonby; Louisa Molesworth

Mary Elizabeth Grey, Countess Grey (née Ponsonby; 4 March 1776 – 26 November 1861) was a British aristocrat and political hostess. She is notable for being the wife of the prime minister in the 1830s through her marriage to Charles Grey, 2nd Earl Grey.

== Biography ==
Mary Elizabeth Ponsonby was born on 4 March 1776 in Whitehaven. She was the only daughter of William Ponsonby (1744–1806), the future 1st Baron Ponsonby and his wife, the Honourable Louisa Molesworth (1749–1824), daughter of Richard Molesworth, 3rd Viscount Molesworth.

== Personal life ==
She married on 18 November 1794 Charles Grey MP (1764–1845), the future 2nd Earl Grey and Prime Minister of the United Kingdom of Great Britain and Ireland. He was the son of Charles Grey (1729–1807), later 1st Baron Grey and 1st Earl Grey, and his wife Elizabeth Grey née Grey (1743–1822). They had ten sons and five daughters:

- Lady Louisa Elizabeth Grey (7 April 1797 – 26 November 1841); married John Lambton, 1st Earl of Durham (known for the Durham report)
- Lady Elizabeth Grey (10 July 1798 – 8 November 1880); married John Crocker Bulteel (d. 10 September 1843)
- Lady Caroline Grey (30 August 1799 – 28 April 1875); married Capt. The Hon. George Barrington
- Lady Georgiana Grey (17 February 1801 – 13 September 1900); never married
- Henry George Grey, 3rd Earl Grey (28 December 1802 – 9 October 1894), eldest son, who became a politician like his father
- General Charles Grey (15 March 1804 – 31 March 1870), father of Albert Grey, 4th Earl Grey
- Admiral Sir Frederick William Grey (23 August 1805 – 2 May 1878)
- Lady Mary Grey (2 May 1807 – 6 July 1884); married Charles Wood, 1st Viscount Halifax
- Hon. William Grey (13 May 1808 – 11 February 1815)
- Admiral Hon. George Grey (16 May 1809 – 3 October 1891); married Jane Frances, daughter of Gen Hon Sir Patrick Stuart
- Hon. Thomas Grey (29 December 1810 – 8 July 1826)
- Rev. Hon. John Grey MA, DD (2 March 1812 – 11 November 1895); married Lady Georgiana Hervey (daughter of Frederick William Hervey, 1st Marquess of Bristol). Remarried Helen Spalding (maternal granddaughter of John Henry Upton, 1st Viscount Templetown)
- Rev. Hon. Francis Richard Grey MA (31 March 1813 – 22 March 1890); married Lady Elizabeth Howard (1816–1891), daughter of George Howard, 6th Earl of Carlisle, and Lady Georgiana Cavendish (daughter of Georgiana Cavendish, Duchess of Devonshire and William Cavendish, 5th Duke of Devonshire)
- Hon. Henry Cavendish Grey (16 October 1814 – 5 September 1880); Army Captain
- Hon. William George Grey (15 February 1819 – 19 December 1865); married Theresa Catherine, only daughter of Maj-Gen Count Stedink, Insp-Gen of Cavalry, Sweden.

Additionally, they had a female stillborn in 1796.

== Later life and death ==
Charles Grey, 2nd Earl Grey, was Prime Minister of the United Kingdom of Great Britain and Ireland from 22 November 1830 to 16 July 1834. Mary Grey, Countess Grey, was widowed on 17 July 1845. She lived until 26 November 1861, when she died at age 85 in Eaton Square, London.
