= William Ponsonby, 1st Baron Ponsonby =

Anglo-Irish politician (1744–1806)

The Right Honourable The Lord Ponsonby of Imokilly PC (Ire)
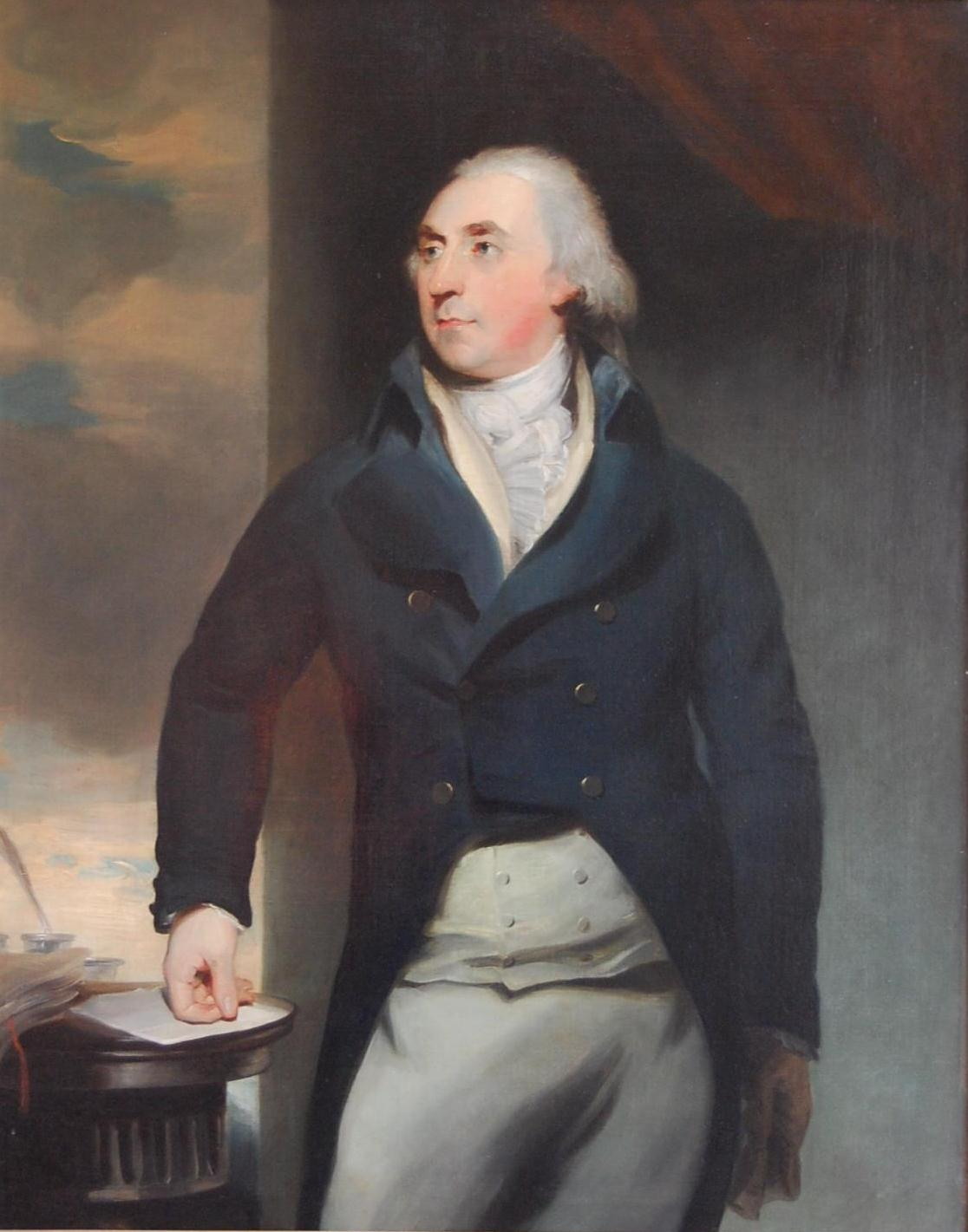
- Portrait after Sir Thomas Lawrence, c. 1795

Joint Postmaster General of Ireland
- In office 1784–1789
- Monarch: George III
- Succeeded by: The Earl of Bellomont
Parliamentary offices
Member of the House of Lords
Lord Temporal
Hereditary peerage 13 March 1806 – 5 November 1806
Preceded by	Newly created
Succeeded by	John Ponsonby
County Kilkenny (United Kingdom)
In office 1801–1806
Preceded by	New constituency
Succeeded by	Hon. George Ponsonby
County Kilkenny (Ireland)
In office 1783–1801
Preceded by	Hon. John Ponsonby
Succeeded by	Parliament of the United Kingdom
Newtownards
In office 1783–1783
Preceded by	Sir John Browne, 7th Bt
Succeeded by	Hon. John Ponsonby
Bandonbridge
In office 1776–1783
Preceded by	Francis Bernard
Succeeded by	Francis Bernard
Cork City
In office 1764–1776
Preceded by	Sir John Freke, 3rd Bt
Succeeded by	Richard Longfield

Personal details
- Born: William Brabazon Ponsonby; 15 September 1744 Dublin, Ireland
- Died: 6 November 1806 (aged 62) London, England
- Spouse: Louisa Molesworth m. 1769 d. 1824
- Children: John Ponsonby, 1st Viscount Ponsonby of Imokilly; Sir William Ponsonby; Richard Ponsonby; George Ponsonby; Frederick Ponsonby; Mary Grey, Countess Grey
- Parent(s): John Ponsonby; Elizabeth Cavendish
- Occupation: Politician

William Brabazon Ponsonby, 1st Baron Ponsonby (of Imokilly), PC (Ire) (15 September 1744 – 5 November 1806) was an Anglo-Irish Whig politician, being a member of the Irish House of Commons, and, after 1800, of the United Kingdom parliament. Ponsonby was the son of the Hon. John Ponsonby, the Speaker of the Irish House of Commons, and Lady Elizabeth Cavendish, daughter of the 3rd Duke of Devonshire. He was invested as a Privy Counsellor of Ireland in 1784. He served as Joint Postmaster-General of Ireland (1784–1789).

== Political career ==
Ponsonby was educated at Pembroke College, Cambridge. He represented Cork City between 1764 and 1776 and thereafter Bandonbridge between 1776 and 1783. He was the leader of a powerful family grouping of between ten and fourteen MPs, the second largest in the Irish House of Commons. During the regency crisis of 1788–89, he gave his support to the Prince of Wales in opposition to William Pitt the Younger. As a consequence, he was dismissed from the Post Office. Thereafter he permanently aligned himself with Charles James Fox and together with his brother George gathered together the various small groups of Irish Whigs into a unified opposition. As with their English counterparts, their ultimate objective was to re-establish the influence of the landowning classes at the expense of the crown. Ponsonby became committed to the cause of Catholic Emancipation, as a means of securing a loyal population at a time of radical agitation and potential foreign invasion.

Pitt's coalition with the Portland Whigs in July 1794 and Earl FitzWilliam's consequent appointment as Lord Lieutenant of Ireland gave Ponsonby and his allies an opportunity to regain office. He was on the brink of becoming Irish secretary of state and had sat on the Treasury bench. In 1795, however, he appears to have persuaded FitzWilliam to dismiss John Beresford from his post as first commissioner of the revenue on the grounds of alleged corruption, apparently in revenge for earlier political dealings. The subsequent political crisis led in 1795 to FitzWilliam's swift removal from office, Beresford's reinstatement, and to Ponsonby's humiliating return to opposition.

Ponsonby was a leading opponent of the union between Ireland and Great Britain. In 1783, he stood for Newtownards and County Kilkenny. He chose the latter constituency and sat for it from 1783 until the Act of Union came into force in 1801. He became then part of the Foxite Whig opposition in the Westminster House of Commons, voting against the Addington and Pitt ministries and in favour of the Prince of Wales and Catholic Emancipation. His influence was declining, however, and by 1803 effective leadership of the Irish Whigs had passed to his brother George.

== Peerage ==
By the time Fox regained office in 1806 as member of Grenville's Ministry of All the Talents, Ponsonby's health was poor, with the result that his wife urgently pressed his claims for a peerage, arguing that it was merited by his opposition to the Regency Bill and the Union, and by his staunch support for the Foxites at Westminster. As a consequence, he was raised swiftly to the peerage of the United Kingdom on 13 March 1806. He was gazetted as 'Baron Ponsonby, of Imokilly in the County of Cork', although other sources generally refer to him as 'Baron Ponsonby of Imokilly'. He died in Seymour Street, London, on 5 November 1806, and was buried in Ireland.

== Testimonials ==
At a personal level Edmund Burke described Ponsonby in a letter to Lord Charlemont as "a manly, decided character, with ... a clear and vigorous understanding." He was as interested in sport as he was in politics and was said to have kept 'the best hunting establishment in Ireland' at Bishopscourt, his seat in County Kildare, where it was also reported that he lived 'in the most hospitable and princely style' (Cokayne, The Complete Peerage). In addition, he was easily irritated, especially if his status and pretensions went unacknowledged. Thus, although he took a leading part in creating a Whig opposition in Ireland in the 1790s, he overplayed his hand under FitzWilliam, and his effectiveness was thereafter limited.

== Family ==
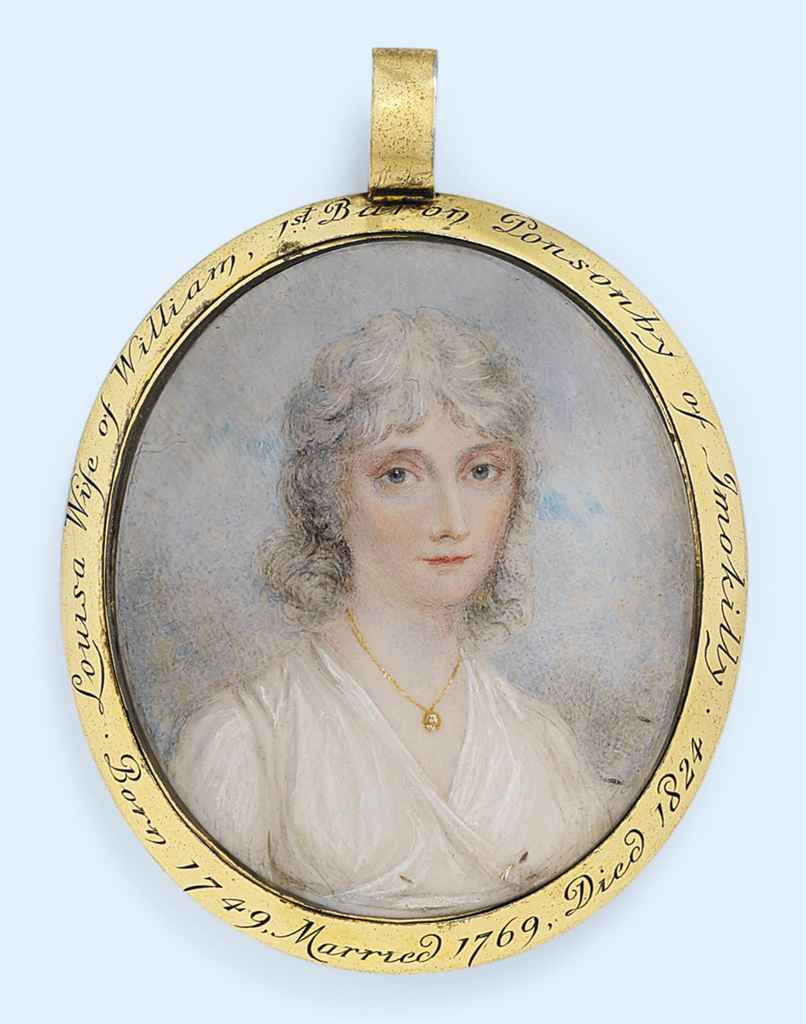
Louisa, Baroness Ponsonby of Imokilly (1749–1824)

In 1769 Ponsonby married Louisa Molesworth (1749–1824), 4th daughter of the 3rd Viscount Molesworth, and his second wife, Mary Usher. They had five sons, four of whom were men of note and one daughter.

1. John Ponsonby, 1st Viscount Ponsonby, was a diplomat
2. Hon. Sir William Ponsonby, a major-general in the army was killed at the Battle of Waterloo
3. Richard Ponsonby, became bishop of Killaloe and Kilfenora in 1828, Derry in 1831 and Derry and Raphoe in 1834;
4. George Ponsonby was a Member of Parliament and Junior Lord of the Treasury.
5. Mary was married to the Prime Minister, Charles Grey, 2nd Earl Grey.

Ponsonby's descendants include Edward Wood, 1st Earl of Halifax, Sir Alec Douglas-Home and Prince William of Wales.

Parliament of Ireland
Preceded by John Hely-Hutchinson; Sir John Freke, 3rd Bt	Member of Parliament for Cork City; 1764–1776; With: John Hely-Hutchinson	Succeeded by John Hely-Hutchinson; Richard Longfield
Preceded by Francis Bernard; Thomas Adderley	Member of Parliament for Bandonbridge; 1776–1783; With: Lodge Evans Morres	Succeeded by Lodge Evans Morres; Francis Bernard
Preceded by Sir John Browne, 7th Bt; James Somerville	Member of Parliament for Newtownards; 1783; With: Lodge Evans Morres	Succeeded by Hon. John Ponsonby; George Lowther
Preceded by Hon. John Ponsonby; Joseph Deane	Member of Parliament for County Kilkenny; 1783–1801; With: Hon. Henry Welbore Agar 1783–1789; Walter Butler 1789–1796; Hon. John Wandesford Butler 1796; Hon. James Wandesford Butler 1796–1801	Succeeded by Parliament of the United Kingdom
Parliament of the United Kingdom
New constituency	Member of Parliament for County Kilkenny; 1801–1806; With: Hon. James Wandesford Butler	Succeeded by Hon. James Wandesford Butler; Hon. George Ponsonby
Peerage of the United Kingdom
New creation	Baron Ponsonby of Imokilly; 1806	Succeeded by John Ponsonby
