= Brabazon Ponsonby, 1st Earl of Bessborough =

British politician (1679–1758)

The Earl of Bessborough
- Born: 1679
- Died: 4 July 1758 (age 78–79)
- Noble family: Ponsonby
- Spouses: Sarah Colvill (m. 1704; died 1733) Elizabeth Moore (m. 1733; died 1738)
- Issue: Sarah Moore, Countess of Drogheda; William Ponsonby, 2nd Earl of Bessborough; John Ponsonby; Lady Letitia Morres
- Father: William Ponsonby, 1st Viscount Duncannon
- Mother: Mary Moore
- Occupation: Politician, peer

Brabazon Ponsonby, 1st Earl of Bessborough (1679 – 4 July 1758), was a British politician and peer. He was the son of William Ponsonby, 1st Viscount Duncannon, and Mary Moore. He was an active politician from 1705 to 1757 in Great Britain and Ireland. He represented Newtownards and County Kildare in the Irish House of Commons. He inherited his father's viscountcy in 1724 and was made Earl of Bessborough in the Peerage of Ireland in 1739. He is buried in Fiddown, County Kilkenny, Ireland.

Ponsonby married Sarah Margetson, an heiress whose family owned Bishopscourt, County Kildare, and his family remained there until the 1830s.

== Family ==
Ponsonby married twice. His first marriage was in 1704 to Sarah Margetson (d. 21 May 1733), daughter of John Margetson and Alice Caulfeild, and granddaughter of James Margetson, Archbishop of Armagh. Sarah had previously been married to Hugh Colville, son of Sir Robert Colville of Newtownards and his third wife Rose Leslie. Sarah's children by Brabazon Ponsonby:

- Lady Sarah Ponsonby (d. 19 January 1736 or 1737); married in 1727 Edward Moore, 5th Earl of Drogheda, and had issue.
- William Ponsonby, 2nd Earl of Bessborough (1704 – 11 March 1793); married on 5 July 1739, Lady Caroline Cavendish, eldest daughter of William Cavendish, 3rd Duke of Devonshire; had issue.
- John Ponsonby (29 March 1713 – 16 August 1787); married on 22 September 1743 Lady Elizabeth Cavendish, also a daughter of the 3rd Duke of Devonshire; had issue. He was the ancestor of Diana, Princess of Wales and Sarah Ferguson.
- Lady Letitia Ponsonby (c. 1720 – 9 February 1754); married on 3 November 1742 Hervey Morres; had issue. She was the ancestor of the UK prime minister Winston Churchill.

Following his wife's death in May 1733, Ponsonby married Elizabeth Sankey (circa 1680 – 17 July 1738), daughter of John Sankey and Eleanor Morgan, on 28 November 1733.

== Ranks and offices held ==
- Member of Parliament for Newtownards, County Down, between 1705 and 1714
- Captain, 27th Regiment; Enniskillen – 1707
- Sheriff and Governor of County Kilkenny – 1713
- Sheriff and Governor of County Kildare – 1714
- Member of Parliament: County Kildare – 1715 to 1724
- Privy Counsellor (invested) – 10 May 1727
- Commissioner of the Revenue – 1739 to 1744
- Marshal of the Admiralty in Ireland – 1751 to 1752
- Lord Justice in Ireland – 1754 to 1755
- Vice-Admiral of Munster – 1755
- Lord Justice in Ireland – 1756 to 1757

== Titles ==
- 17 November 1724: Succeeded his father as 2nd Viscount Duncannon, of the Fort of Duncannon, county of Wexford, and as 2nd Baron Bessborough, of Bessborough, county of Kilkenny
- 6 October 1739: Created 1st Earl of Bessborough, Ireland
- 12 June 1749: Created 1st Baron Ponsonby of Sysonby, county of Leicester, Great Britain

== Arms ==
Coat of arms of Brabazon Ponsonby, 1st Earl of Bessborough
Crest Out of a ducal coronet Azure three arrows one in pale and two in saltire points downward entwined by a snake Proper. Escutcheon Gules a chevron between three combs Argent. Supporters On either side a lion reguardant Proper. Motto Pro Rege Lege Grege (For king, law and people).

Parliament of Ireland
Preceded by George Carpenter; Charles Campbell	Member of Parliament for Newtownards; 1705–1714; With: Charles Campbell	Succeeded by Charles Campbell; Richard Tighe
Preceded by Thomas Keightley; Joshua Allen	Member of Parliament for County Kildare; 1715–1724; With: Joshua Allen	Succeeded by Joshua Allen; Francis Allen
Peerage of Ireland
New creation	Earl of Bessborough; 1739–1758	Succeeded by William Ponsonby
Preceded by William Ponsonby	Viscount Duncannon; 1724–1758	Succeeded by William Ponsonby
Preceded by William Ponsonby	Baron Bessborough; 1724–1758	Succeeded by William Ponsonby
Peerage of Great Britain
New creation	Baron Ponsonby of Sysonby; 1749–1758; Member of the House of Lords (1749–1758)	Succeeded by William Ponsonby
