= Baron Sysonby =

Extinct barony in the Peerage of the United Kingdom

- Creation date: 24 June 1935
- Created by: George V
- Peerage: United Kingdom
- First holder: Frederick Ponsonby
- Last holder: John Ponsonby
- Remainder to: the 1st Baron's heirs male of the body lawfully begotten.

Baron Sysonby, of Wonersh in the County of Surrey, was a title in the Peerage of the United Kingdom. It was created in 1935 for the soldier and courtier Sir Frederick Ponsonby. He was the second son of Sir Henry Ponsonby, grandson of Frederick Ponsonby, 3rd Earl of Bessborough, while Arthur Ponsonby, 1st Baron Ponsonby of Shulbrede, was his younger brother. The barony became extinct on the death of his grandson, the 3rd Baron, in 2009.

== Barons Sysonby (1935) ==
- Frederick Edward Grey Ponsonby, 1st Baron Sysonby (1867–1935)
- Edward Gaspard Ponsonby, 2nd Baron Sysonby (1903–1956)
- John Frederick Ponsonby, 3rd Baron Sysonby (1945–2009)

== See also ==
- Earl of Bessborough
- Baron Ponsonby of Imokilly
- Baron de Mauley
- Baron Ponsonby of Shulbrede
