= Frederick Ponsonby, 3rd Earl of Bessborough =

British peer and politician (1758–1844)

The Right Honourable The Earl of Bessborough DCL
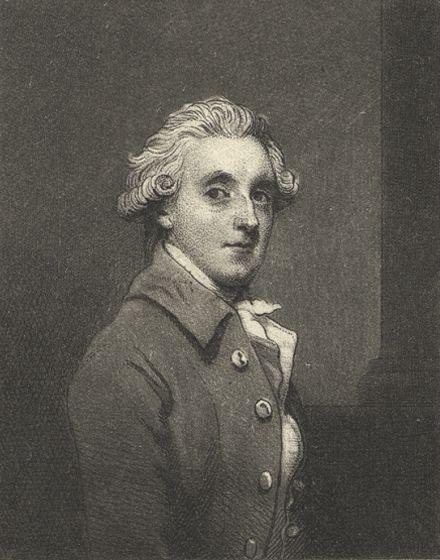
- Lord Bessborough by Samuel William Reynolds.
- Born: Hon. Frederick Ponsonby; 24 January 1758; Marylebone, London, England
- Died: 3 February 1844 (aged 86); Canford House, Dorset, England
- Spouse: Lady Henrietta Spencer (m. 1780; died 1821)
- Issue: John Ponsonby, 4th Earl of Bessborough; Sir Frederick Ponsonby; Lady Caroline Lamb; William Ponsonby, 1st Baron de Mauley
- Father: William Ponsonby, 2nd Earl of Bessborough
- Mother: Lady Caroline Cavendish

Frederick Ponsonby, 3rd Earl of Bessborough (24 January 1758 – 3 February 1844), styled the Viscount Duncannon from 1758 to 1793, was an Anglo-Irish peer.

== Background ==
Ponsonby was the eldest son of Viscount Duncannon (who succeeded as the 2nd Earl of Bessborough in July 1758) and Lady Caroline Cavendish, daughter of the 3rd Duke of Devonshire. He succeeded to his father's titles in 1793. He was educated at Christ Church, Oxford, and obtained the degrees of Master of Arts and Doctor of Civil Law.

As Viscount Duncannon, he sat in the House of Commons as member for Knaresborough from 1780 until his succession to his father's earldom. He was a Lord of the Admiralty in 1782–1783.

== Marriage and issue ==
On 27 November 1780, Duncannon married the intelligent and kind Lady Henrietta Spencer, second daughter of John Spencer, 1st Earl Spencer. Duncannon and Harriet had four children:

- John Ponsonby, 4th Earl of Bessborough (1781–1847); married Lady Maria Fane (daughter of John Fane, 10th Earl of Westmorland) on 16 November 1805. They had 14 children.
- Major General Sir Frederick Ponsonby (1783–1837); married Lady Emily Bathurst (daughter Henry Bathurst, 3rd Earl Bathurst) on 16 March 1825. They had six children.
- Lady Caroline Lamb (1785–1828); married 2nd Viscount Melbourne, the Prime Minister, in 1805. They had two children.
- William Francis Spencer Ponsonby, 1st Baron de Mauley (1787–1855); married Lady Barbara Ashley-Cooper (the only daughter and heir of Anthony Ashley-Cooper, 5th Earl of Shaftesbury) on 8 August 1814. They had three children.

The marriage was notoriously unhappy. Tired of Duncannon's vacillating abusive temper, and craving for love in her life, Harriet started a disastrous affair with Richard Brinsley Sheridan. This affair was indeed disastrous for Harriet, as the worst-case scenario actually happened: the abusive Duncannon walked in on Harriet and Sheridan having intercourse. Violently enraged, Duncannon immediately wanted to divorce Harriet. Divorce in the 18th century was social ruin for women, and Harriet narrowly escaped such calamity only when Duncannon's father William Ponsonby, 2nd Earl of Bessborough, and the powerful Cavendish clan sided with Harriet, making divorcing her social suicide.

Perhaps chastened by time and age, by 1820 Duncannon rather miraculously ceased his abuse, and he and Harriet eventually settled into a companionable marriage.

In 1821, Harriet died suddenly of a "chill" caught while travelling in Italy. Duncannon was heartbroken by her death. He outlived her by more than 20 years, dying at Canford House, Dorset, in 1844.

== Character ==
Duncannon usually made a favourable first impression: quiet, but with "the most mild and amiable manner". On the other hand, he was a notoriously cruel husband, fluctuating between sweet or obsessive attentiveness, neglecting Harriet entirely, or physically abusing her. His abuse of his wife was so public his family could not keep up appearances by pretending it was not occurring. In 1791 Harriet's serious illness gave rise to rumours, apparently quite unfounded, that he was trying to kill her.

Like most of the Ton, Duncannon was a gambling addict. When he would lose, he would erupt into rages that terrified his wife. Duncannon's abuse and his gambling rages made Harriet's family fearful for her safety. Their fears were often proven, as when he threatened violence if Harriet did not hand over her marriage settlement to him after losing an especially ruinous gambling round. Luckily for the terrified Harriet, her brother George Spencer, 2nd Earl Spencer, swept in and protected her from immediate violence by quietly giving Duncannon the money.

== Arms ==
Coat of arms of Frederick Ponsonby, 3rd Earl of Bessborough
Crest Out of a ducal coronet Azure three arrows one in pale and two in saltire points downward entwined by a snake Proper. Escutcheon Gules a chevron between three combs Argent. Supporters On either side a lion reguardant Proper. Motto Pro Rege Lege Grege (For king, law and people).

Parliament of Great Britain
Preceded by Lord George Cavendish; Hon. Robert Walsingham	Member of Parliament for Knaresborough; 1780–1793; With: Hon. Robert Walsingham; James Hare	Succeeded by James Hare; Lord John Townshend
Peerage of Ireland
Preceded by William Ponsonby	Earl of Bessborough; 1793–1844	Succeeded by John Ponsonby
Preceded by William Ponsonby	Viscount Duncannon; 1793–1844	Succeeded by John Ponsonby
Preceded by William Ponsonby	Baron Bessborough; 1793–1844	Succeeded by John Ponsonby
Peerage of Great Britain
Preceded by William Ponsonby	Baron Ponsonby of Sysonby; 1793–1844; Member of the House of Lords (1793–1844)	Succeeded by John Ponsonby
