= Bessborough =

Bessborough may refer to:

== Peerage ==
- Earl of Bessborough, a title in the Peerage of Ireland

== Places ==
- Bessborough Armoury, a Canadian Forces armoury in Vancouver, British Columbia
- Bessborough House, the family seat of the Ponsonby dynasty, Earls of Bessborough, in County Kilkenny, Ireland
- Bessborough Mother & Baby Home, an institution in County Cork, Ireland, 1922–1998
- Bessborough Reservoir, south of the River Thames in Surrey, England
- Bessborough School, Moncton, New Brunswick, Canada
- Delta Bessborough, a hotel in downtown Saskatoon, Saskatchewan, Canada
- Bessboro, the founding name of Westport, New York, United States

== People ==
- Brabazon Ponsonby, 1st Earl of Bessborough (1679–1758), British politician and peer
- William Ponsonby, 2nd Earl of Bessborough PC PC (I) (1704–1793), Irish and English peer and member of the House of Lords
- Frederick Ponsonby, 3rd Earl of Bessborough (1758–1844), British peer
- Henrietta Ponsonby, Countess of Bessborough (1761–1821), wife of Frederick Ponsonby, 3rd Earl of Bessborough and mother of the notorious Lady Caroline Lamb
- John Ponsonby, 4th Earl of Bessborough PC (1781–1847), British Whig politician
- John Ponsonby, 5th Earl of Bessborough, PC (1809–1880), British cricketer and politician
- Frederick Ponsonby, 6th Earl of Bessborough (1815–1895), British peer and cricketer
- Walter Ponsonby, 7th Earl of Bessborough (1821–1906), British peer and member of the House of Lords
- Edward Ponsonby, 8th Earl of Bessborough, KP, CB, CVO (1851–1920), British peer
- Vere Ponsonby, 9th Earl of Bessborough PC GCMG (1880–1956), British businessman and politician who served as Governor General of Canada
- Roberte Ponsonby, Countess of Bessborough (born 1892), wife of Vere Ponsonby 9th Earl of Bessborough, Viscount Duncannon.
- Frederick Ponsonby, 10th Earl of Bessborough (1913–1993), British diplomat, businessman, playwright, Conservative politician, and peer
- Arthur Ponsonby, 11th Earl of Bessborough (1912–2002), British peer
