= Roberte Ponsonby, Countess of Bessborough =

French-British noblewoman

The Right Honourable The Countess of Bessborough GCStJ JP
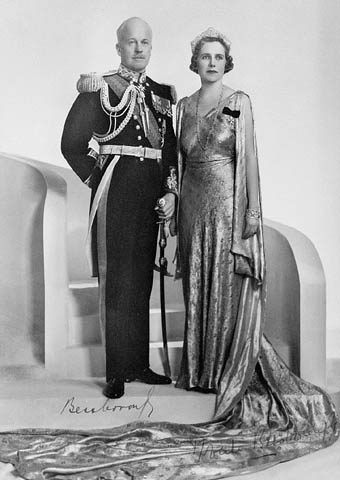
- The Earl and Countess of Bessborough, 1933

Viceregal consort of Canada
- In office 1931–1935
- Preceded by: The Marchioness of Willingdon
- Succeeded by: The Baroness Tweedsmuir

Personal details
- Born: Roberte Poupart de Neuflize; 15 September 1892 Soisy-sous-Montmorency, France
- Died: 22 November 1979 (aged 87) Kensington, London, England
- Spouse: Vere Ponsonby, 9th Earl of Bessborough (m. 1912; died 1956)
- Children: 4, including Frederick and Moyra
- Parent(s): Jean de Neuflize; Madeleine Dolfuss-Davilliers
- Awards: Legion of Honour

Roberte Ponsonby, Countess of Bessborough, GCStJ, JP (née Poupart de Neuflize; 15 September 1892 – 22 November 1979), was a French noblewoman who married into the English aristocracy and served as Viceregal Consort of Canada in the 1930s.

== Early life ==
She was the only daughter of Baron Jean Poupart de Neuflize and Madeleine Dolfuss-Davilliers and grew up in the family home, 7 Rue Alfred-de-Vigny, a hôtel particulier in the 8th arrondissement of Paris. She had two older brothers, André Poupart de Neuflize (who married the American heiress Eva Barbey), and Jacques Poupart de Neuflize, a banker who succeeded their father in running the family bank.

Her mother was a granddaughter of French industrialist Jean Dollfus.

== Personal life ==
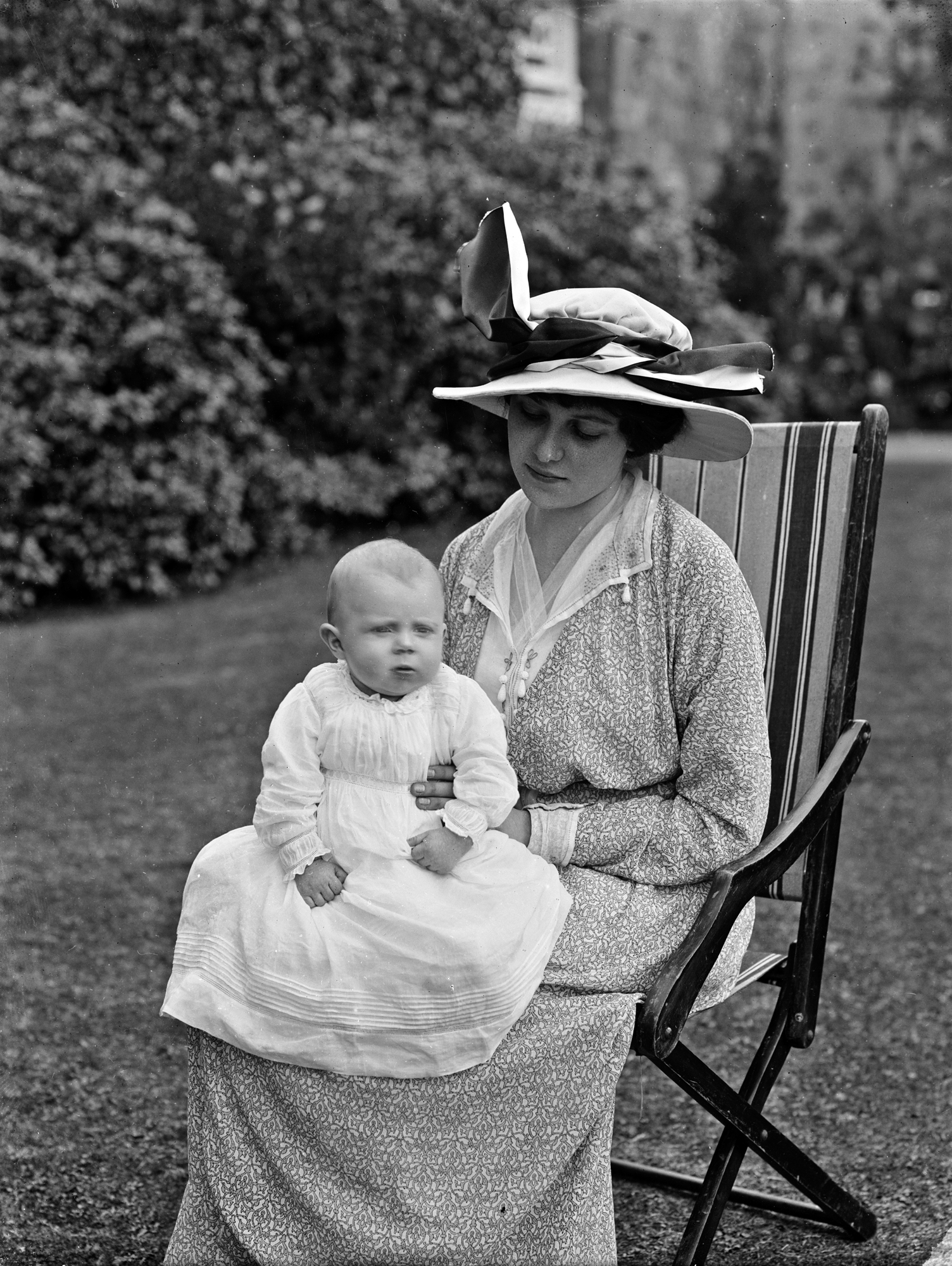
Viscountess Duncannon with her eldest son, Frederick, c. September 1913

On 25 June 1912, she married Vere Ponsonby, Viscount Duncannon (1880–1956), son of Edward Ponsonby, 8th Earl of Bessborough, and Blanche Vere Guest; she held the courtesy title of Viscountess Duncannon. Her husband inherited the title of Earl of Bessborough upon the death of his father on 1 December 1920, whereupon Roberte became the Countess of Bessborough. Together, they had three sons (two of whom predeceased their parents) and a daughter:

- Frederick Edward Neuflize Ponsonby, 10th Earl of Bessborough (1913–1993), who married Mary Munn, a daughter of Charles A. Munn Jr. and Mary Astor Paul, in 1948.
- Hon. Desmond Neuflize Ponsonby (1915–1925), who died after a riding accident.
- Lady Moyra Blanche Madeleine Ponsonby (1918–2016), who married, as his second wife, Sir Denis John Wolko Browne, a son of Sylvester J. Browne, in 1945. Sir Denis' first wife, Helen de Guerry Simpson, died from cancer in 1940.
- Lt. Hon. George St Lawrence Neuflize Ponsonby (1931–1951), who died unmarried.

In 1924, they purchased a country house in England, known as Stansted House in Stoughton, West Sussex. On 2 June 1937, her husband was created Earl of Bessborough in the Peerage of the United Kingdom (the earlier earldom was created in the Peerage of Ireland).

Lord Bessborough died at Stansted House on 10 March 1956, and Lady Bessborough died in 1978.

=== Honours ===
She was invested as a Dame Grand Cross, Most Venerable Order of the Hospital of St. John of Jerusalem (GC.St.J). She was decorated with the Chevalier, Legion of Honour. She held the office of Justice of the Peace for West Sussex between 1943 and 1956.

Honorary titles
Preceded by The Marchioness of Willingdon	Viceregal Consort of Canada; 1931–1935	Succeeded by The Baroness Tweedsmuir
