= Jean de Neuflize =

French banker (1850–1928)

Jean de Neuflize CVO
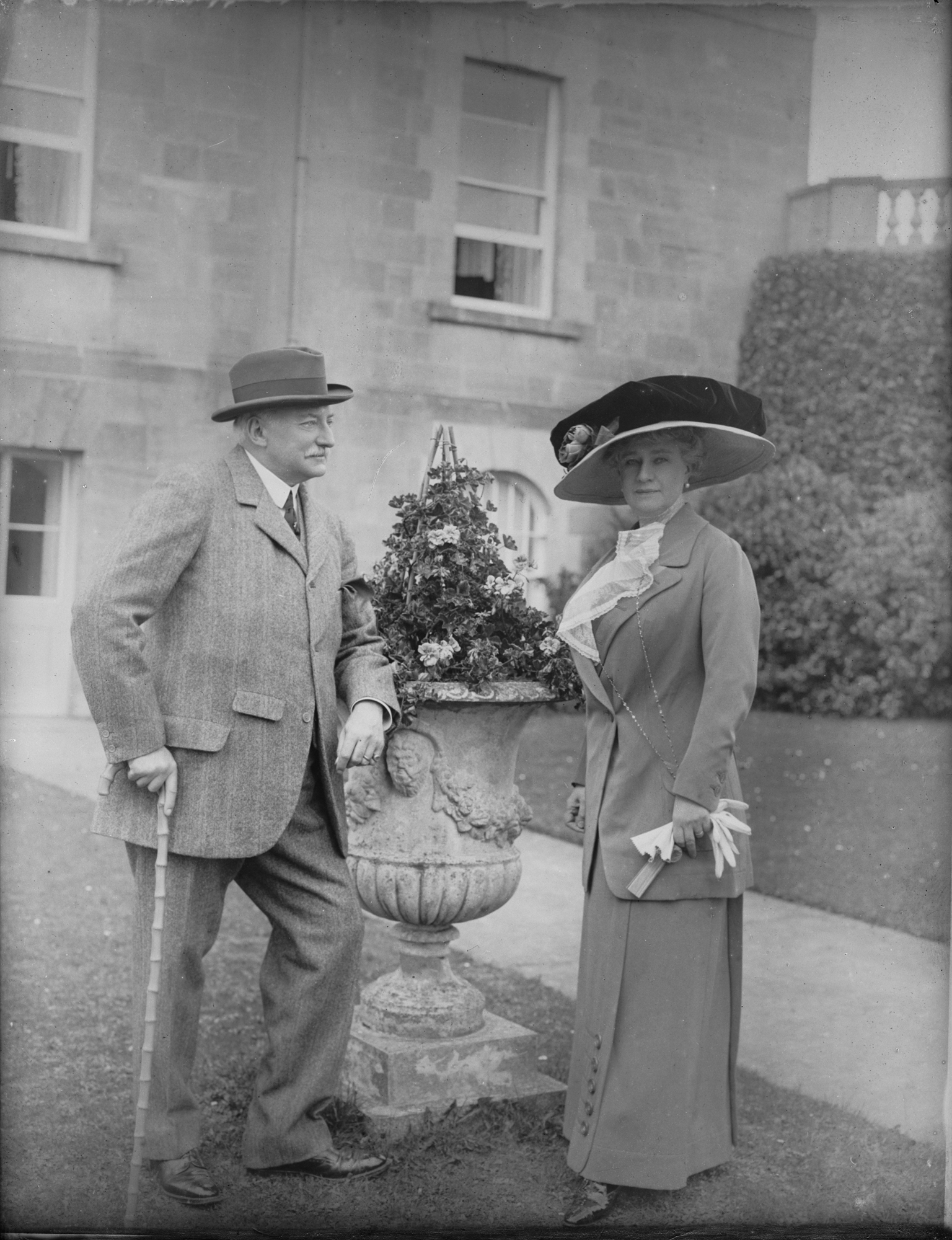
- Baron and Baroness de Neuflize, 1912
- Born: Jean Frédéric André Poupart de Neuflize; 21 August 1850; Paris, France
- Died: 20 September 1928 (aged 78); Coye-la-Forêt, France
- Education: Lycée Saint-Louis; Lycée Bonaparte
- Spouse: Madeleine Dolfuss-Davilliers (m. 1874; died 1926)
- Relatives: Frederick Ponsonby, 10th Earl of Bessborough (grandson); Lady Moyra Browne (granddaughter)
- Awards: Legion of Honour
- Sports career
- Nationality: French
- Sport: Equestrian
Medal record
Bronze medal – third place	1900 Paris	Mail coach event

Jean Frédéric André Poupart, 4th Baron of Neuflize CVO (21 August 1850 – 20 September 1928) was a French banker and equestrian. He received recognition with his appointment as an officer of the Legion of Honour.

== Early life ==
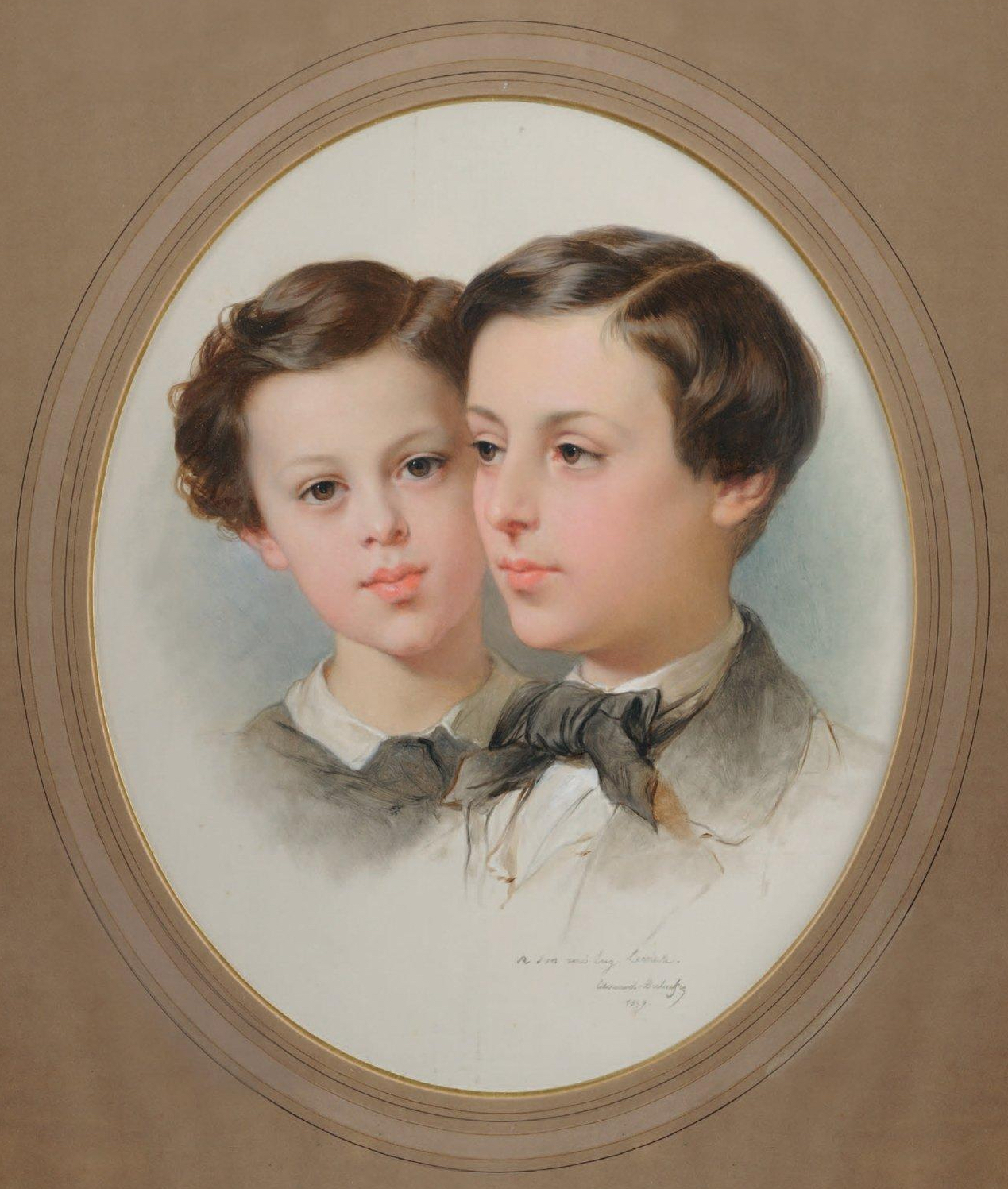
Portrait of Jean and his brother, by Édouard Dubufe, 1859.

Neuflize was born in Paris on 21 August 1850 into the prominent minority Protestant establishment of France. He was the eldest son of Jean André Poupart de Neuflize, 3rd Baron of Neuflize (1820–1868), and his wife, Marie Louise André (1826–1907).

His great-grandfather, Jean Abraham Poupart de Neuflize (who was made the first Baron of Neuflize in 1810), built the Château de Montvillers in 1770 in Bazeilles in the Grand Est region of northern France.

He was educated at the Lycée Saint-Louis, followed by the Lycée Bonaparte.

== Career ==
Neuflize, a banker, succeeded his father as the head of the Banque de Neuflize et Cie in Paris, which had been founded in 1710 by his great-grandfather Jean Abraham Poupart de Neuflize, a draper from Sedan, Ardennes, and traced its lineage to seventeenth century Genoa. (Note: In 1945, Neuflize merged with the Banque Schlumberger (which had been formed in 1919). In 1966, the Banque de Neuflize‐Schlumberger merged with La Banque Mallet Freres et Cie (founded 1713) to become the Banque de Neuflize, Schlumberger, Mallet (NSM). In 1972, Mees & Hope obtained a minority interest in the bank and in April 1980, Algemene Bank Nederland (one of the main predecessors in ABN AMRO) obtained a majority interest in NSM. In 1999, NSM acquired Banque Demachy to become NSMD.) His family's bank was among the most prominent banking houses of France, which included the Hottinguer, Mallet, Rothschilds and Vernes banks. He was succeeded in the bank by his second son, Jacques, who was the representative of the Banque de French in America during World War I.

From 1902 until his death in 1928, he was a Regent of Banque de France, the central bank of France, and was serving as Dean of Regents at the time of his death. In 1904, he helped established the French investment bank Banque de l'Union Parisienne. He was also vice president of Paris, Lyons & Marseilles Railway, chairman of the board of directors of the Ottoman Bank, and president of the Évian Mineral Water Society.

== Equestrian ==
In June 1900, Neuflize was awarded third place in the four-in-hand (mail coach) driving event during the International Horse Show in Paris. The show was part of the Exposition Universelle, and the equestrian events were later classified as part of the 1900 Summer Olympics.

== Personal life ==
On 28 April 1874, Neuflize was married to Madeleine Dolfuss-Davilliers (1855–1926). She was born in Soisy-sous-Montmorency and was a daughter of Mathieu Dollfus and Laure Cécile Davillier, and granddaughter of industrialist Jean Dollfus. In Paris, they lived at 7 Rue Alfred-de-Vigny, a Hôtel particulier in the 8th arrondissement, Together, they were the parents of three children:

- André Poupart de Neuflize (1875–1949), who in 1903 married American heiress Eva Barbey (1879–1969), a daughter of Henry Isaac Barbey and Mary Lorillard Barbey and sister of Hélène Barbey (who married Count Hermann de Pourtalès).
- Jacques Poupart de Neuflize (1883–1953), a banker who married Alixe Coche de la Ferté (1893–1923), a daughter of Alexandre Coche de la Ferté. After her death, he married Antoinette Meyer-Borel (d. 1942).
- Roberte Poupart de Neuflize (1892–1979), who married Vere Ponsonby, 9th Earl of Bessborough, the son of Edward Ponsonby, 8th Earl of Bessborough, in 1912.

In 1897, he built the Château des Tilles, a large Norman villa near Coye-la-Forêt in the Oise department in northern France near Chantilly.

Neuflize was appointed a chevalier of the Legion of Honour in 1900, and an officer in 1908.

The Baron de Neuflize died on 20 September 1928 at Coye-la-Forêt. His funeral was held at the Père Lachaise Cemetery where he was buried.

=== Descendants ===
Through his eldest son, André, he was a grandfather of Jacqueline de Neuflize, who married Baron Jean de Watteville-Berckheim of Paris in 1937, Marie Madeleine de Neuflize, who married the Baron Christian de Turckheim (and resided at Château de Blanant in Lorraine), and Genevieve de Neuflize (1907–1938), who married Count Costa de Beauregard (later the Marquis de Beauregard), the son of Ferdinand Costa, Marquis de Beauregard. (Note: Upon their wedding, Count Costa de Beauregard inherited Château de Beauregard, the Beauregard family residence on Lake Geneva in Switzerland.)

Through his daughter, the Countess of Bessborough, he was a grandfather of four, including: Frederick Edward Neuflize Ponsonby, 10th Earl of Bessborough (1913–1993), the Hon. Desmond Neuflize Ponsonby (1915–1925), who died young, Lady Moyra Ponsonby (1918–2016), and Lt. Hon. George St Lawrence Neuflize Ponsonby (1931–1951).
