= Charles Munn =

Charles Munn may refer to:

- Charles Munn (politician) (1887–1973), politician from Minnesota
- Charles A. Munn III (born 1954), American conservationist
- Charles Allen Munn (1859–1924), editor of Scientific American

== See also ==
- Charles L. Munns (born 1950), retired American Navy officer
