= Frederick Ponsonby =

Frederick Ponsonby may refer to:

- Frederick Ponsonby, 3rd Earl of Bessborough (1758–1844), Anglo-Irish peer
- Frederick Ponsonby (1775-1849), MP for Galway Borough 1811–1813
- Frederick Ponsonby (British Army officer) (1783–1837), British military officer, second son of the 3rd Earl of Bessborough
- Frederick Ponsonby, 6th Earl of Bessborough (1815–1895), English peer and cricketer
- Frederick Ponsonby, 1st Baron Sysonby (1867–1935), British soldier and courtier
- Frederick Ponsonby, 10th Earl of Bessborough (1913–1993), British diplomat, businessman, playwright, politician, and peer
- Frederick Ponsonby, 4th Baron Ponsonby of Shulbrede (born 1958), British peer and Labour Party politician
