= Mary Astor Paul =

Philadelphia socialite

Mary Paul Munn Allez
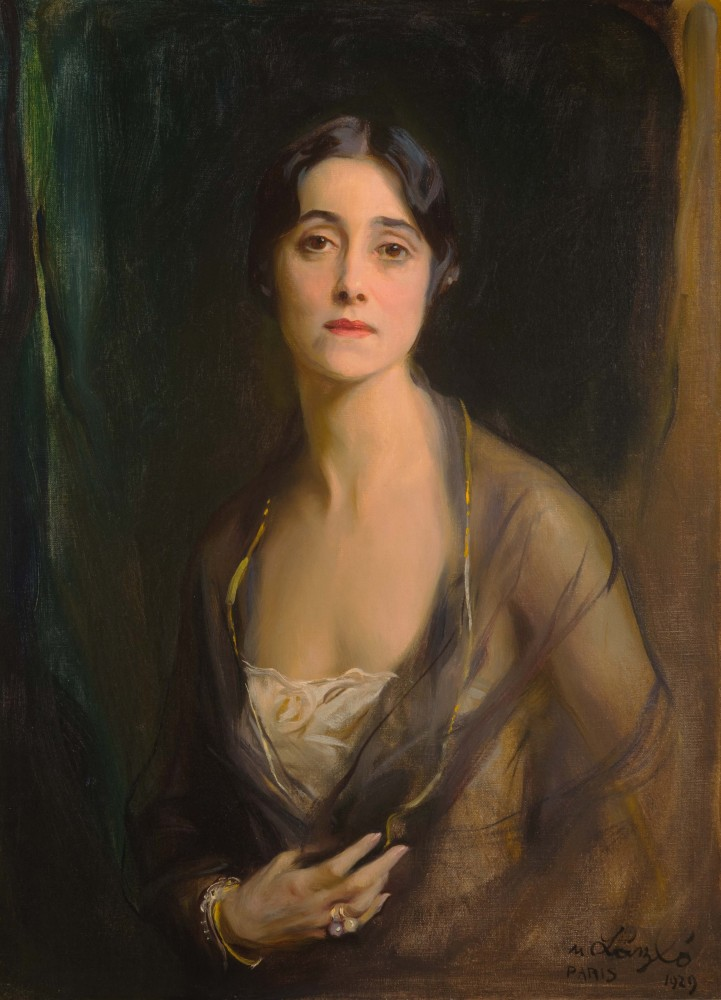
- Born: Mary Astor Paul; March 26, 1889; Radnor, Pennsylvania, US
- Died: July 28, 1950 (aged 61); Paris, France
- Spouses: Charles Alexander Munn Jr. (m. 1909; div. 1930) Jacques Allez (m. 1934)
- Children: 4
- Relatives: William Waldorf Astor (uncle); Anthony J. Drexel (grandfather); Anthony Biddle Sr. (cousin); Charles A. Munn III (grandson)
- Awards: Medal of Freedom; Légion d'honneur

Mary Astor Paul Munn Allez (March 26, 1889 – July 28, 1950) was a Philadelphia socialite who was related to the Astor and Drexel families. During World War II, she helped the American forces in France.

== Early life ==
Mary was born on March 26, 1889, and raised in Radnor, Pennsylvania. She was the daughter of James William Paul Jr. (1851–1908) and Frances Katherine "Fanny" (née Drexel) Paul (1858–1901). Her siblings were Ellen Drexel (née Paul) Mills and Anthony Joseph Drexel Paul. Her father was a banker affiliated with the Drexel interests in Philadelphia and the Morgan interests in New York.

Her paternal grandparents were James William Paul and Hannah Clement (née Bunker) Paul. Her aunt, Mary Dahlgren Paul, was married to William Waldorf Astor (who moved to England and became the 1st Viscount Astor). Her cousins included Waldorf Astor, 2nd Viscount Astor (husband of Nancy Astor, the first woman to take her seat in the House of Commons), Hon. Pauline Astor (wife of politician Herbert Spender-Clay), and John Jacob Astor, 1st Baron Astor of Hever. Her maternal grandparents were Anthony Joseph Drexel and Ellen (née Rozet) Drexel. Among her large extended family was uncle Anthony Joseph Drexel Jr. and cousins Anthony Joseph Drexel Biddle Sr. and Margaretta Armstrong Drexel (wife of Guy Finch-Hatton, 14th Earl of Winchilsea).

== Personal life ==
She was presented to society in 1907 and on October 28, 1908, her engagement to Charles Alexander Munn Jr. was announced. Then a student at Harvard, Munn was a son of Charles Alexander Munn and Carrie Louise (née Gurnee) Munn. They were married on June 21, 1909, at St. Martin Episcopal Church in Radnor, Pennsylvania. Many members of society were present, including the Drexel and Roosevelt families. After their marriage, the couple lived at Woodcrest, their residence in Radnor, until they sold it in 1925. After the sale, the couple sailed to France, intending on living there for a decade. However, Mary filed for divorce in 1930, citing abandonment. Before their divorce, they had four children together, three daughters and a son, including:

- Pauline Munn (1909–1939), who married Milton Dorland Doyle of New York, in Cap Ferrat, France in 1931. The marriage was a tumultuous one, and after twice filing and then dismissing divorce charges, they divorced in 1938. She died in France the following year.
- Charles Alexander Munn (1913–1957), who served with the United States Naval Reserve, rising to the rank of lieutenant in 1941. At that time, he married Louise Stanley, the actress, in New York City. He later married Loretta Strauff in 1950.
- Mary Munn (1915–2013), a still life painter who married Frederick Ponsonby, Viscount Duncannon at the American Cathedral in Paris. Lord Dunacannon succeeded as the 10th Earl of Bessborough in 1956 and she became the Countess of Bessborough.
- Frances Drexel Munn (1917–2012), who married George F. Baker (1915–1977), son of banker George Fisher Baker, in New York City in 1938. They divorced in 1958; he later committed suicide in 1977.

In 1917, she was drawn by John Singer Sargent and, in 1929, she was painted by Philip de László. After their divorce, she remarried to Jacquez Eami Adrien Allez (1894–1963) in 1934. In 1953, her first husband remarried to Dorothy Spreckels (daughter of Sugar tycoon Adolph B. Spreckels and his wife, Alma de Bretteville Spreckels).

She died in Paris on July 28, 1950, and was buried at cemetery in Mortefontaine.

=== World War II involvement ===
During World War II, she served the United States Military in a large role. She served as president of the American Aid Society in Paris. During the French resistance movement, she helped contact the American forces under the code name "Pauline." Speaking of her service, Mme. Allez said that her contacts were throughout France, and consisted of people from all walks of life and occupations. She was also in personal contact throughout the war with the American Legation in Berne, Switzerland, and Robert Murphy, the United States Consul.

The President of the United States, Harry S. Truman, awarded Mme. Allez the American Medal of Freedom for her service. At the same time, French President Vincent Auriol made her a chevalier of the Legion of Honor.
