= 1913 Dover by-election =

UK parliamentary by-election

The 1913 Dover by-election was held on 23 June 1913. The by-election was held due to the death of the incumbent Conservative MP, George Wyndham. It was won by the Conservative candidate Vere Ponsonby, who was unopposed. Ponsonby would later become ninth Earl of Bessborough.
