= Denis Browne (surgeon) =

British surgeon

Sir Denis Browne KCVO
- Born: 2 April 1892; Melbourne
- Died: 9 January 1967 (aged 74); London
- Education: St Paul's College, University of Sydney
- Occupation: Paediatric surgeon
- Organization: Hospital for Sick Children at Great Ormond Street
- Known for: Denis Browne bar
- Spouses: Helen Simpson (m. 1927; died 1940) Lady Moyra Ponsonby (m. 1945)
- Children: 3

Sir Denis John Wolko Browne KCVO (2 April 1892 – 9 January 1967) was the first British surgeon to devote his practice entirely to the care of children. A native of Australia, he served in the Royal Australian Army Medical Corps in World War I before moving to England and joining the staff of the Hospital for Sick Children at Great Ormond Street. An amateur tennis player in the 1920s, he made four appearances at Wimbledon.

He created several medical devices, including the Denis Browne bar and a restraint device used in surgery known as the Denis Browne crucifix. Browne suggested modifications to the surgical or medical treatment of children with several conditions. He devised his own approach to the repair of hypospadias and worked on improvements to the management of other genitourinary, gastrointestinal, orthopaedic and cardiovascular problems. He was the first president of the British Association of Paediatric Surgeons and the association awards the Denis Browne Gold Medal for worldwide excellence in paediatric surgery.

Browne was married to novelist Helen de Guerry Simpson until her death in 1940. A few years later, he married nurse administrator Lady Moyra Ponsonby. He practised at Great Ormond Street until 1957, when he was named emeritus surgeon. He died of a short illness a few years after his retirement and was survived by his second wife and three children.

== Early life ==
Browne's grandfather, William Stawell, who was Chief Justice of Victoria

Born in Melbourne, Browne was the son of Sylvester J. Browne and Anne Catherine Stawell. His maternal grandfather, William Stawell, had come to Australia from Ireland and had become Chief Justice of Victoria. Browne's uncle, Thomas Alexander Browne, was an author with the pseudonym Rolf Boldrewood. Sylvester Browne moved his family to a sheep farm in New South Wales when Denis was nine.

A tall, athletic youngster, Browne had been given the middle name Wolko, which was an Aboriginal word for "big man". Growing up on a sheep farm had given Browne long-lasting interests in shooting and horsemanship. He studied medicine at St. Paul's College in Sydney, where he held the position of Senior Student in 1914. After graduating from medical school, Browne was a captain with the Royal Australian Army Medical Corps during World War I, and he served in Gallipoli with the 13th Light Horse Regiment. He became ill with typhoid fever, necessitating his return to Australia. He later returned to service and was in charge of a field ambulance in France.

He later returned to service and was in charge of a field ambulance in France. He moved to the 3rd Australian Auxiliary Hospital in England. He was allowed military leave to spend time with orthopaedic surgeon Sir Robert Jones of the Royal Southern Hospital in Liverpool, leading him to resign his military commission in 1919. He subsequently worked as a physician in Middlesex and London.

== Career ==
Browne joined the staff of England's Hospital for Sick Children at Great Ormond Street in 1922, and he introduced several devices to enhance the care of children with surgical problems. He introduced a "top hat" facemask device for the delivery of ether anesthesia to children in 1928. In 1930, Browne created a wooden T-shaped device for the restraint of infants during surgery. A second version of the device, which became known as the Denis Browne crucifix, was padded and made of duralumin.

Browne studied and influenced the surgical management of a wide variety of problems, including cleft lip and palate, patent ductus arteriosus, intestinal obstruction and genitourinary problems. He paid special attention to the surgical problems of newborns, and he introduced new thoughts on the development and management of conditions such as club foot and hypospadias. In formulating his version of the hypospadias repair, Browne knew that fistulae lined with epithelium would not close, so he created a fistula between the hypospadias and the similarly lined tip of the penis. He also realised that one of the common steps in such repairs – the transfer of skin from the foreskin to the ventral surface of the penis – was unnecessary.

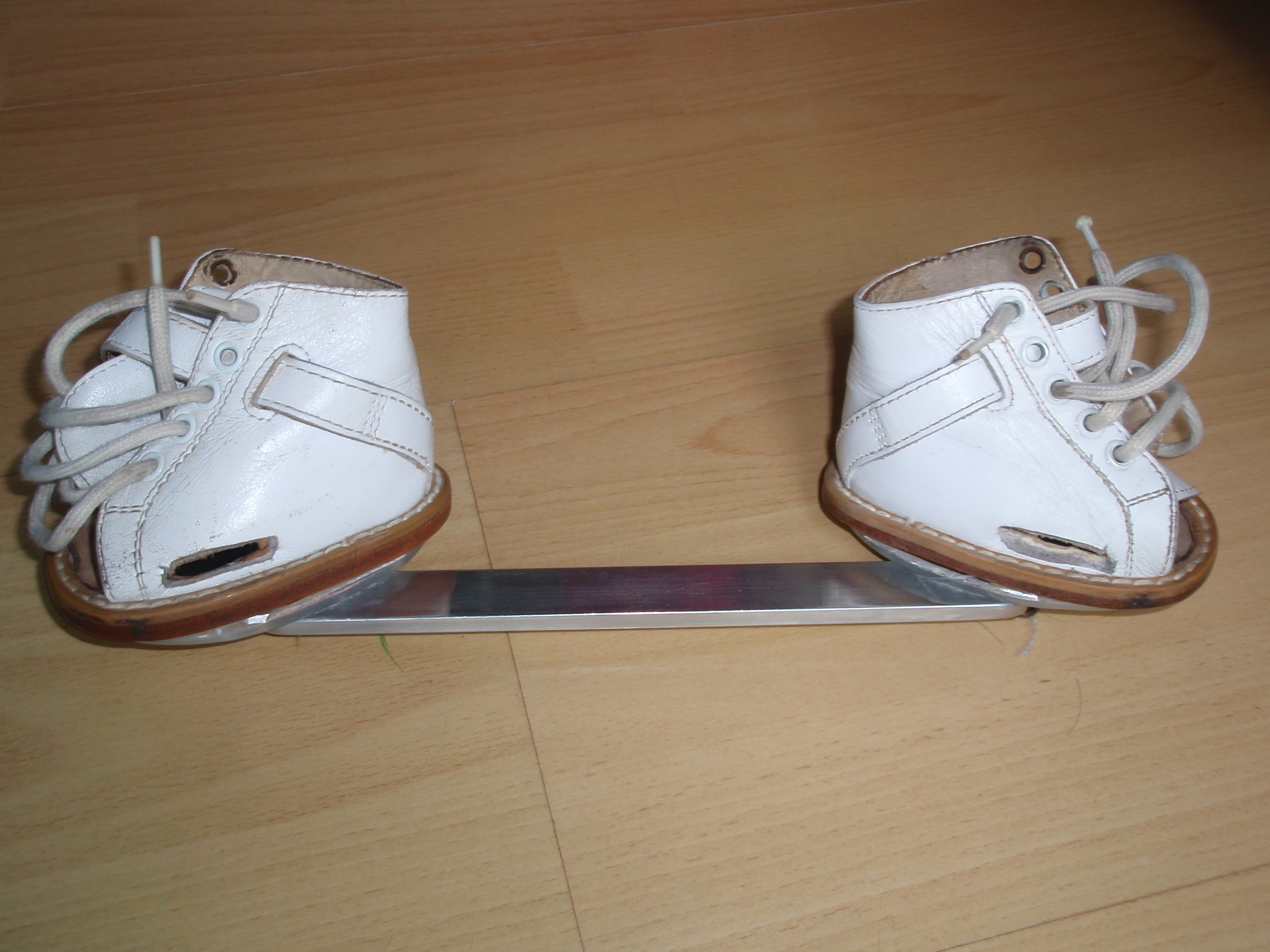
Denis Browne bar

In the correction of club foot, Browne suggested that the feet would respond to bracing. He created a device consisting of a bar and open-toed shoes that would keep the feet joined horizontally at optimal angles of external rotation – 20 degrees of external rotation for unaffected feet and as much as 90 degrees for the affected limbs. Nearing the end of his career, Browne expressed frustration that the Denis Browne bar had met with resistance from orthopaedic surgeons and that the device had been modified without his consultation before it was introduced in the US.

Often approaching surgical problems with unique thought processes, he was sometimes seen as resistant to the opinions of other physicians. He was said to be very kind, but he could appear aloof, as he did not engage in much conversation. Commenting on Browne's reputation for brash behavior, surgeon E. Durham Smith wrote, "He certainly had a prickly personality and a particular venom reserved for orthopaedic surgeons and anatomists, but his achievements may have been possible only by one possessed of such a strong and towering character."

Browne was an honorary fellow of the Royal Australasian College of Surgeons and the International College of Surgeons. He was the first president of the British Association of Paediatric Surgeons (BAPS). He and a few other paediatric surgeons had founded the organization in 1954. Because there were only thought to be 50–60 paediatric surgeons in the world at that time, BAPS quickly developed an international membership.

== Personal ==
Browne's father-in-law, Vere Ponsonby, 9th Earl of Bessborough

As a young doctor, Browne married novelist Helen de Guerry Simpson and they had one daughter, named Clemence after one of Simpson's literary collaborators, Clemence Dane. Simpson died in 1940. For the next few years, Browne lived at Great Ormond Street, and his daughter sometimes came to stay with him. He married Lady Myra Ponsonby in 1945; she was the daughter of Vere Ponsonby, 9th Earl of Bessborough. She was a nurse and later became the vice president of the Royal College of Nursing and the superintendent of St. John Ambulance. They had two children together, a son and daughter. His son is the libel barrister Desmond Browne QC, a former Chairman of the Bar of England and Wales.

Browne was a skilled amateur tennis player, and he appeared in the first round at Wimbledon each year between 1921 and 1924. His four Wimbledon losses included a singles match against future Japanese Olympian Masanosuke Fukuda and a doubles match where he faced Jacques Brugnon. In his room at Great Ormond Street, he painted a line at the level of a tennis net so that he could practise his shots.

Browne enjoyed making modifications to common objects for his personal use. He created a round tennis racquet that he felt was superior to the traditional oval, and he was known to modify his own guns. When he was at Great Ormond Street, Browne created a universal golf club with an adjustable angle of lift. A resident at the hospital recalled that when Browne demonstrated the golf club, he drove a golf ball with such force that it broke a window at the nearby homeopathic hospital.

== Later life ==
During Browne's tenure as surgeon-in-chief at Great Ormond Street, a number of distinguished physicians practiced there, including cardiac surgeon David Waterston and urologists David Innes Williams and Barry O'Donnell. In 1957, Browne was named an emeritus surgeon. Four years later, he was made Knight Commander of the Royal Victorian Order (KCVO) and Chevalier of the Legion of Honour.

Browne developed a brief illness and died at his London home on 9 January 1967. The year after Browne's death, the British Association of Paediatric Surgeons established the first annual Denis Browne Gold Medal for outstanding worldwide contributions to the field.

== Arms ==
Coat of arms of Denis Browne

Notes
Inherited by his son Desmond and displayed on a painted panel at Gray's Inn.
Crest
An eagle displayed Vert gorged with a wreath of trefoils and charged on each wing with a star of eight points Or.
Escutcheon
Argent two lions passant in pale Gules on a chief Azure the hulk of an ancient galley with oars Or.
Motto
Suivez Raison
