= Ponseti method =

- Specialty: Orthopedic

The Ponseti method is a manipulative technique that corrects congenital clubfoot without invasive surgery. It was developed by Ignacio V. Ponseti of the University of Iowa Hospitals and Clinics, US, in the 1950s, and was repopularized in 2000 by John Herzenberg in the US and Europe and in Africa by NHS surgeon Steve Mannion. It is a standard treatment for clubfoot.

== Description ==
Ponseti treatment was introduced in UK in the late 1990s and widely popularized around the country by NHS physiotherapist Steve Wildon. The manipulative treatment of club foot deformity is based on the inherent properties of the connective tissue, cartilage, and bone, which respond to the proper mechanical stimuli created by the gradual reduction of the deformity. The ligaments, joint capsules, and tendons are stretched under gentle manipulations. A plaster cast is applied after each manipulation to retain the degree of correction and soften the ligaments. The displaced bones are thus gradually brought into the correct alignment with their joint surfaces progressively remodeled yet maintaining congruency. After two months of manipulation and casting the foot appears slightly over-corrected. After a few weeks in splints, however, the foot looks normal.

Proper foot manipulations require a thorough understanding of the anatomy and kinematics of the normal foot and of the deviations of the tarsal bones in the clubfoot. Poorly conducted manipulations will further complicate the clubfoot deformity. The non-operative treatment will succeed better if it is started a few days or weeks after birth and if the podiatrist understands the nature of the deformity and possesses manipulative skill and expertise in plaster-cast applications.

The Ponseti technique is painless, fast, cost-effective and successful in almost 100% of all congenital clubfoot cases. The Ponseti method is endorsed and supported by the World Health Organization, National Institutes of Health, American Academy of Orthopedic Surgeons, Pediatric Orthopedic Society of North America, European Pediatric Orthopedic Society, CURE International, STEPS Charity Worldwide, STEPS Charity South Africa, and A Leg to Stand On (India).

== Procedure ==
The calcaneal internal rotation (adduction) and plantar flexion is the key deformity. The foot is adducted and plantar-flexed at the subtalar joint, and the goal is to abduct the foot and dorsiflex it. In order to achieve correction of the clubfoot, the calcaneus should be allowed to rotate freely under the talus bone, which also is free to rotate in the ankle mortise. The correction takes place through the normal arc of the subtalar joint. This is achieved by placing the index finger of the operator on the medial malleolus to stabilize the leg and levering on the thumb placed on the lateral aspect head of the talus while abducting the forefoot in supination. Forcible attempts at correcting the heel varus by abducting the forefoot while applying counter pressure at the calcaneocuboid joint prevents the calcaneus from abducting and therefore everting.

Foot cavus increases when the forefoot is pronated. If cavus is present, the first step in the manipulation process is to supinate the forefoot by gently lifting the dropped first metatarsal to correct the cavus. Once the cavus is corrected, the forefoot can be abducted.

Pronation of the foot also causes the calcaneus to jam under the talus. The calcaneum cannot rotate and stays in varu; the cavus then increases, resulting in a bean-shaped foot. At the end of the first step, the foot is maximally abducted but never pronated.

The manipulation is carried out in the cast room, with the baby having been fed just prior to the treatment or even during the treatment. After the foot is manipulated, a long leg cast is applied to hold the correction. Initially, the short leg component is applied. The cast should be snug with minimal but adequate padding. The authors paint or spray the limb with tincture of benzoin to allow adherence of the padding to the limb. The authors prefer to apply additional padding strips along the medial and lateral borders to facilitate safe removal of the cast with a cast saw. The cast must incorporate the toes right up to the tips but not squeeze the toes or obliterate the transverse arch. The cast is molded to contour around the heel while abducting the forefoot against counter pressure on the lateral aspect of the head of the talus. The knee is flexed to 90° for the long leg component of the cast. The parents can soak these casts for 30–45 minutes prior to removal with a plaster knife. The authors' preferred method is to use the oscillating plaster saw for cast removal. The cast is bivalved and removed. The cast then is reconstituted by coapting the two halves. This allows for monitoring of the progress of the forefoot abduction and, in the later stages, the amount of dorsiflexion or equinus correction.

Forcible correction of the equinus (and cavus) by dorsiflexion against a tight Achilles tendon results in a spurious correction through a break in the midfoot, resulting in a rocker-bottom foot. The cavus should be separately treated as outlined in step 2, and the equinus should be corrected without causing a midfoot break. It generally takes up to 4–7 casts to achieve maximum foot abduction. The casts are changed weekly. The foot abduction (correction) can be considered adequate when the thigh-foot axis is 60°. After maximal foot abduction is obtained, most cases require a percutaneous Achilles tenotomy. This is performed in the cast room under aseptic conditions. The local area is anesthetized with a combination of a topical lignocaine preparation (e.g. EMLA cream) and minimal local infiltration of lidocaine. The tenotomy is performed through a stab incision with a round tip (#6400) Beaver blade. The wound is closed with a single absorbable suture or with adhesive strips. The final cast is applied with the foot in maximum dorsiflexion, and the foot is held in the cast for 2–3 weeks.

Following the manipulation and casting phase, the feet are fitted with open-toed straight-laced shoes attached to a Denis Browne bar. The affected foot is abducted (externally rotated) to 70° with the unaffected foot set at 45° of abduction. The shoes also have a heel counter bumper to prevent the heel from slipping out of the shoe. The shoes are worn for 23 hours a day for three months and are worn at night and during naps for up to three years.

In 10–30% of cases, a tibialis anterior tendon transfer to the lateral cuneiform is performed when the child is approximately three years of age. This gives lasting correction of the forefoot, preventing metatarsus adductus and foot inversion. This procedure is indicated in a child aged 2–2.5 years with dynamic supination of the foot. Prior to surgery, cast the foot in a long leg cast for a few weeks to regain the correction.
