= Ignacio Ponseti =

Spanish-American physician (1914–2009)

Ignacio Ponseti (3 June 1914 – 18 October 2009), also known as Ignasi Ponsetí i Vives, was a Spanish-American physician, specializing in orthopedics. He was born on 3 June 1914 in Menorca, part of the Balearic Islands, Spain, Ponseti was the son of a watchmaker and spent his childhood helping repair watches. This skill was said to eventually contribute to his abilities as an orthopedist. He served three years as a medic during the Spanish Civil War treating orthopedic injuries of wounded soldiers. He left Spain shortly after the end of the war and became a faculty member and practicing physician at the University of Iowa, where he developed his ground-breaking, non-surgical treatment for the clubfoot defect - the Ponseti Method.

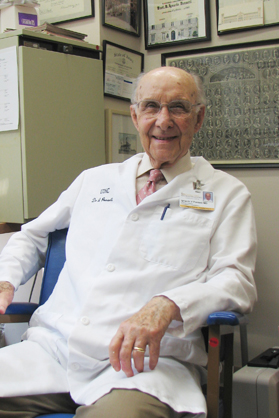
Ignasi Ponsetí i Vives, MD

== Biography ==
In the 1950s, Ignacio Ponseti developed the Ponseti method (also known as the Ponseti technique), a non-surgical technique that uses a series of casts, followed by an abduction brace, to correct congenital clubfoot. The condition causes a baby's feet to turn inward and downward; if not corrected, the child will be unable to walk or move properly. He was known for this method of clubfoot treatment that bears his name, and was Professor Emeritus in the Department of Orthopaedic Surgery at University of Iowa Hospitals and Clinics.

== Education ==
Ponseti studied medicine at Barcelona University. Not long after he graduated, fighting broke out between the Nationalists and the Republicans - the start of the Spanish Civil War. Ponseti served as a medical officer with the Loyalists as a lieutenant, then captain, in the Orthopaedic and Fracture Service. His duties included setting fractures, which put him on a career in orthopaedics. Without ambulances, Ponseti used the help of local smugglers to take the injured into France. He soon escaped to France himself and went to Mexico, where for two years he practiced family medicine. A physician there helped him get to Iowa in 1941 to study orthopaedics under Arthur Steindler, M.D. Ponseti completed a residency at Iowa in 1944 and became a member of the orthopaedic faculty at University of Iowa Hospitals and Clinics.

Early in his career at Iowa, Ponseti saw that the outcomes of clubfoot surgical treatments were not very good - patients had limited movement. He set out to develop a treatment that made the most of babies' flexible ligaments. The method was met with some opposition but over the past 50 years it has been adopted by the majority of doctors and other health care providers worldwide, being considered the gold standard for treatment, including in Britain and Turkey.

Well into his nineties, Ponseti continued to see patients and trained visiting doctors from around the world. He also developed new prosthetic devices with John Mitchell of MD Orthopaedics, Inc. and produced training and information DVDs on the method.

Ponseti's other research focused on congenital and developmental bone and joint disorders, skeletal growth disorders in children, and the biochemistry of cartilage. He gained insight in the early 1950s on the effect of amino nitriles on collagen cross linking, defined the curvature patterns of idiopathic scoliosis, and demonstrated that curves progressed after skeletal maturity. He also conducted many studies evaluating the long-range results of treatments for congenital dislocation of the hip, clubfoot and scoliosis.

Ponseti was succeeded at the University of Iowa by Dr. Jose Morcuende who has continued his legacy of clubfoot patient treatment, research, and training of physicians globally.

== The Ponseti method ==
Clubfoot affects well over 100,000 newborns annually. Early in his career at the University of Iowa, Ponseti realized that surgical approaches did not fully correct clubfoot and/or created problems later in life, such as severe arthritis or even requiring more surgery. In working to develop a new approach, he determined it could be nonsurgical. The Ponseti method uses gentle, manual manipulation of the foot, followed by application of toe-to-groin plaster casts. The casts are changed weekly after a clinician manipulates softened foot ligaments to gradually achieve near-normal muscle and bone alignment.

In addition to the improved physical outcomes, compared to surgery, the Ponseti method is less expensive and can be taught to nonphysician health care providers, which is useful in areas with few or no doctors. Clubfoot is the most common musculoskeletal birth deformity, affecting 200,000 newborn children each year worldwide, 80% of whom are in developing countries. The Ponseti method is used, for example, in Uganda, where efforts continue to improve the availability of the treatment.

The Ponseti method is effective when properly applied by a trained health care provider and is considered the "gold standard" treatment, leading to a normal, productive life. Nearly 80% of children can expect an excellent to good long-term outcome; however, a minority of children will get recurrence requiring repeated treatment, or on occasion surgery. Non-compliance with the method is the greatest risk-factor for failure.

At the 2007, International Clubfoot Symposium attended by 200 doctors from 44 countries, papers were presented regarding an estimated 10,000 children successfully treated with the technique around the world in recent years.

The Ponseti International Association for the Advancement of Clubfoot Treatment was founded in 2006 to improve the treatment of children born with clubfoot, through education, research and improved access to care. PIA has a related website devoted to parents' interests and needs. Groups that work with Ponseti International include CURE International and A Leg to Stand On (India) and Pehla Qadam (Pakistan).

== World Clubfoot Day ==
World Clubfoot Day was introduced in 2013 by Ponseti International Association, and is celebrated on June 3 every year, commemorating Ponseti's birthday. This date was chosen following the signing of the Iowa Clubfoot Declaration during the 2nd International Clubfoot Symposium held in Iowa City, Iowa, USA, on October 4 – 5, 2012.

The goal of World Clubfoot Day is to raise awareness about clubfoot disability and its prevention using the Ponseti method.

== Notes ==
- Percas-Ponseti, Helena (2007). Homage to Iowa: The Inside Story of Ignacio V. Ponseti. University of Iowa Press.
- Ponseti, Ignacio (1996). Congenital Clubfoot: Fundamentals of Treatment. Oxford, Oxfordshire: Oxford University Press. ISBN 0-19-262765-1.
