= Stansted Park =

Edwardian country house in Stoughton, England

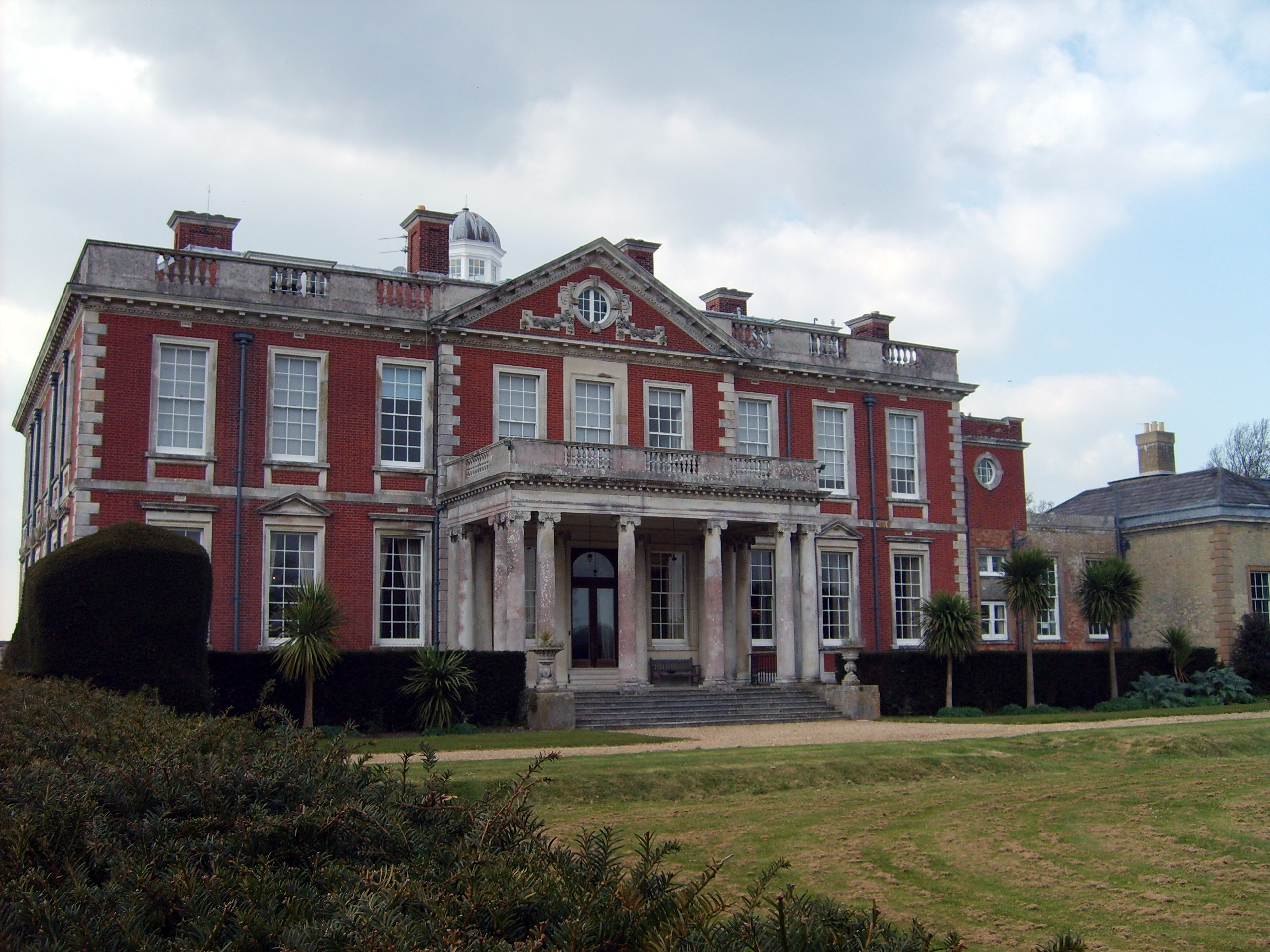
- Stansted House

- Location within West Sussex

General information
- Location: Stoughton, West Sussex, England
- Coordinates: 50.887058°N 0.917282°W

Listed Building – Grade II*
- Official name: Stansted House
- Designated: 5 June 1958
- Reference no.: 1354611

National Register of Historic Parks and Gardens
- Official name: Stansted Park
- Designated: 1 June 1984
- Reference no.: 1000327

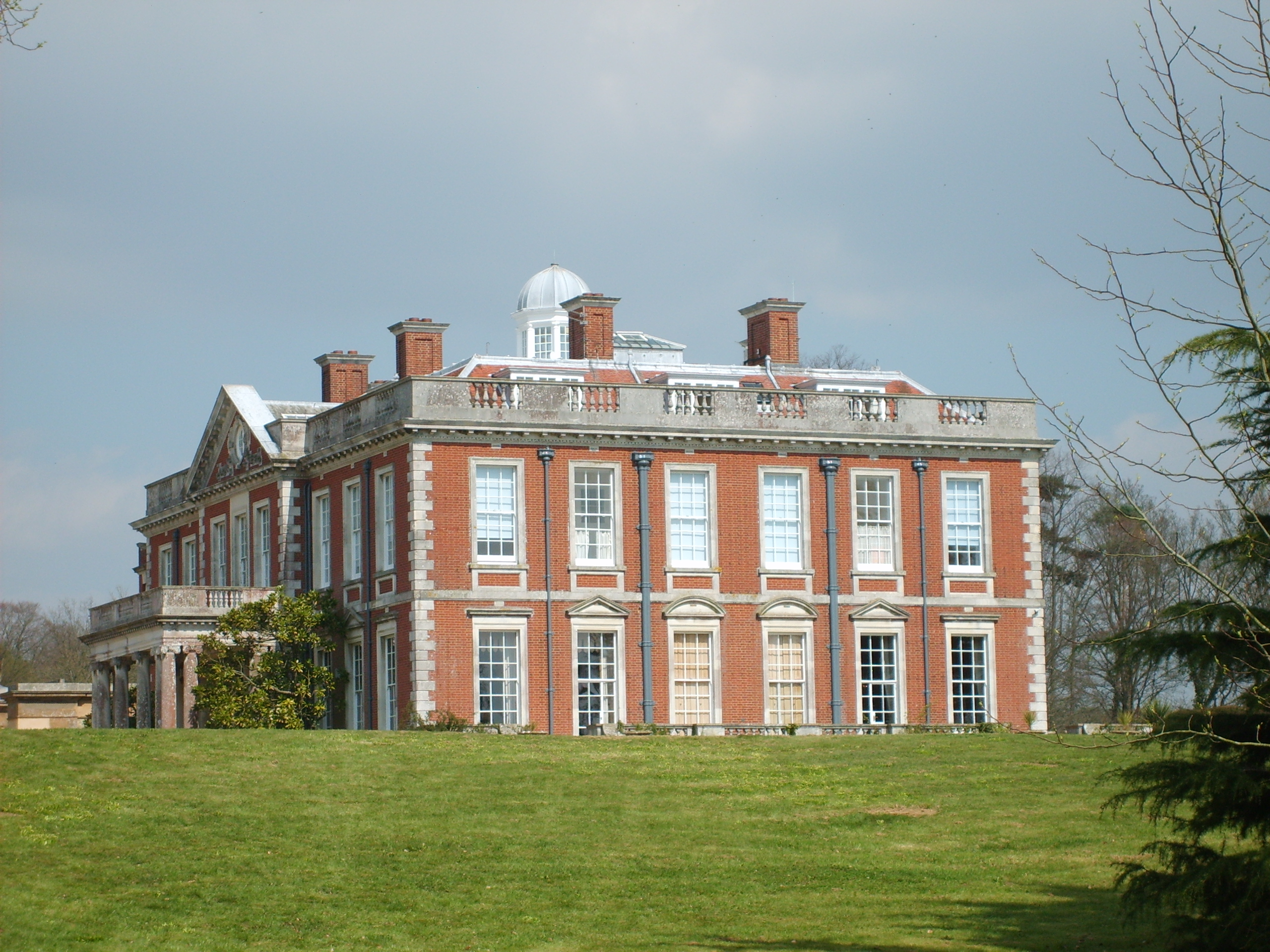
Side view

Stansted Park (including Stansted House) is an Edwardian country house in the parish of Stoughton, West Sussex, England. It is near the city of Chichester, and also the village of Rowlands Castle to the west over the border in Hampshire.

The house is set in the 1,800-acre (7.3 km^{2}) park, with woodland and open land grazed by deer. Stansted House has Carolean revival decor and is Grade II* listed. The surrounding area, Stansted Park, is also Grade II* listed.

== History ==
The area that is now the park is mentioned in the Domesday Book of 1086, as being included in the Hundred of Bourne. Some sources suggest that at some time before 1094, a hunting lodge was built for Roger de Montgomery, 1st Earl of Arundel. The historic listing summary adds that "Stansted probably originated as a park within the Royal Forest of Bere Porchester, whose over-lords were the earls of Arundel. It was recorded as in use for hunting and for timber production in the medieval period, while a survey of buildings of the Manor of Stansted in 1327 included a hall and a chapel".

In 1177 Henry II visited Stansted. Two other monarchs visited in the next hundred years, Richard I of England hunted boar here in 1194 and John, King of England visited in both 1214 and 1215. The next monarch to arrive here was Edward VI, in 1552.

John Lumley, 1st Baron Lumley built a house on the site which was visited by Elizabeth I on 23 August 1591. Robert Cecil described this house as "fayre, well builte without and not meanly furnished within, but want of water is a greate inconvenience."

A new house was built on the present site, starting in 1686, for Richard Lumley, probably to a design by William Talman. The historic listing states that Richard laid out "formal gardens, radiating avenues and parkland on its east side. He probably also cut the central avenue through Stansted Forest to the west".

The property was inherited in 1776 by George Montagu-Dunk, 2nd Earl of Halifax; he also built the nearby folly tower, now known as Racton Monument. After his death in 1771, the estate was inherited by his daughter Anna Donaldson. Seven years later, George III and Queen Charlotte visited; the property was later sold. Subsequent owners made modifications to the building and the grounds, most significantly in 1782.

While under the ownership of George Wilder, the main block was destroyed by fire in 1900 but the stables and the service wing were not affected; the block was rebuilt "in the style of Wren", on the exact footprint of the previous building, in 1903. The architect was Arthur Blomfield. It was purchased by Vere Ponsonby, 9th Earl of Bessborough, in 1924. During World War II, the house sheltered orphans from Southsea. In 1939 Queen Elizabeth, the consort of George VI, spent one night here and in 1962, Anne, Princess Royal visited Stansted House and went for a swim.

Since 1983 the house and estate have been owned by Stansted Park Foundation, a charitable trust charged with the preservation of the estate for the benefit of the nation. The trust was set up by Frederick Ponsonby, 10th Earl of Bessborough, who died without a male heir in 1993. An illustrated history of Stansted Park from the 12th century is included in Lord Bessborough's book The Enchanted Forest.

The park is crossed from west to east by the Monarch's Way long-distance footpath.

The park was closed during the COVID-19 pandemic but is now re-opened. For more information about access and events, see the official website (details below).

== Chapel of St Paul ==
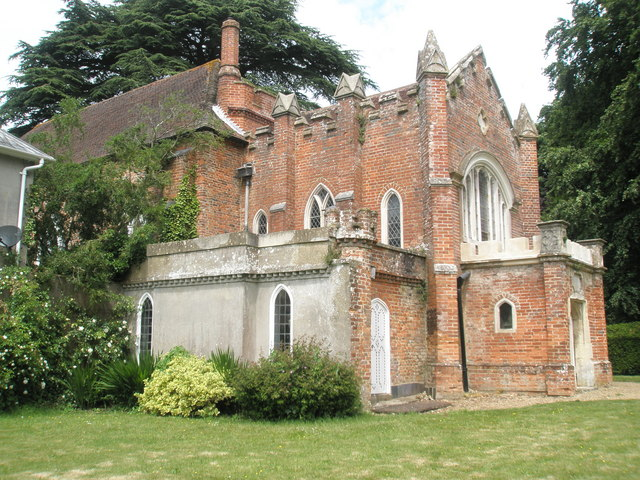
St Paul's Chapel

The chapel was built by Lewis Way in 1812–16, as part of his mission to convert the Jews. It is Grade I listed. It was an inspiration to the poet John Keats when he was writing The Eve of St. Agnes. The church was restored by Harry Stuart Goodhart-Rendel in 1926.

The park's website adds some specifics: "It was consecrated on 25th January 1819 [and] contains a unique East window with Christian/Jewish iconography and Hebrew tablets of the Ten Commandments."

During the 1926 restoration, the sanctuary was re-decorated, with inspiration from Sainte-Chapelle, in Paris. During World War II, the chapel was damaged but it was restored in 1947.

The chapel is open to the public when the estate is open, and there is a monthly service of prayer and a carol service at Christmas. Occasional wedding blessings are also held in the chapel.

== Light Railway ==
Logo of Stansted Light Railway

The Stansted Park Light Railway (50.88442°N 0.92255°W) is a 7 1/4 in (184 mm) gauge miniature railway on the grounds of Stansted House. The railway opened on Easter 2005, and is designed to attract more visitors to the house.

The railway uses locomotives and carriages designed and built by railway volunteers. The railway is rapidly expanding. The new extension is now complete, and incorporates a 12-foot span girder bridge. The layout also includes a 6 road engine shed and workshop,

== Early cricket ==
In June 1741, a cricket match between Slindon Cricket Club and Portsmouth Cricket Club was played in the park. It is the earliest report of a match involving the Slindon team. The team's patron Charles Lennox, 2nd Duke of Richmond, wrote in a letter to his friend Thomas Pelham-Holles, 1st Duke of Newcastle, that "above 5,000 people" were present. This is the only time that Stansted Park is mentioned in surviving cricket records. The cricket club still plays fixtures during the summer months.

== See also ==
- Grade II* listed buildings in West Sussex

== Bibliography ==
- ACS (1981). A Guide to Important Cricket Matches Played in the British Isles 1709 – 1863. Nottingham: ACS.
- McCann, Tim (2004). Sussex Cricket in the Eighteenth Century. Sussex Record Society.
- Maun, Ian (2009). From Commons to Lord's, Volume One: 1700 to 1750. Roger Heavens. ISBN 978-1-900592-52-9.
- Lewis Way - A Biography by Geoffrey Henderson, 2015
