= Denis Browne bar =

Medical device used in the treatment of club foot

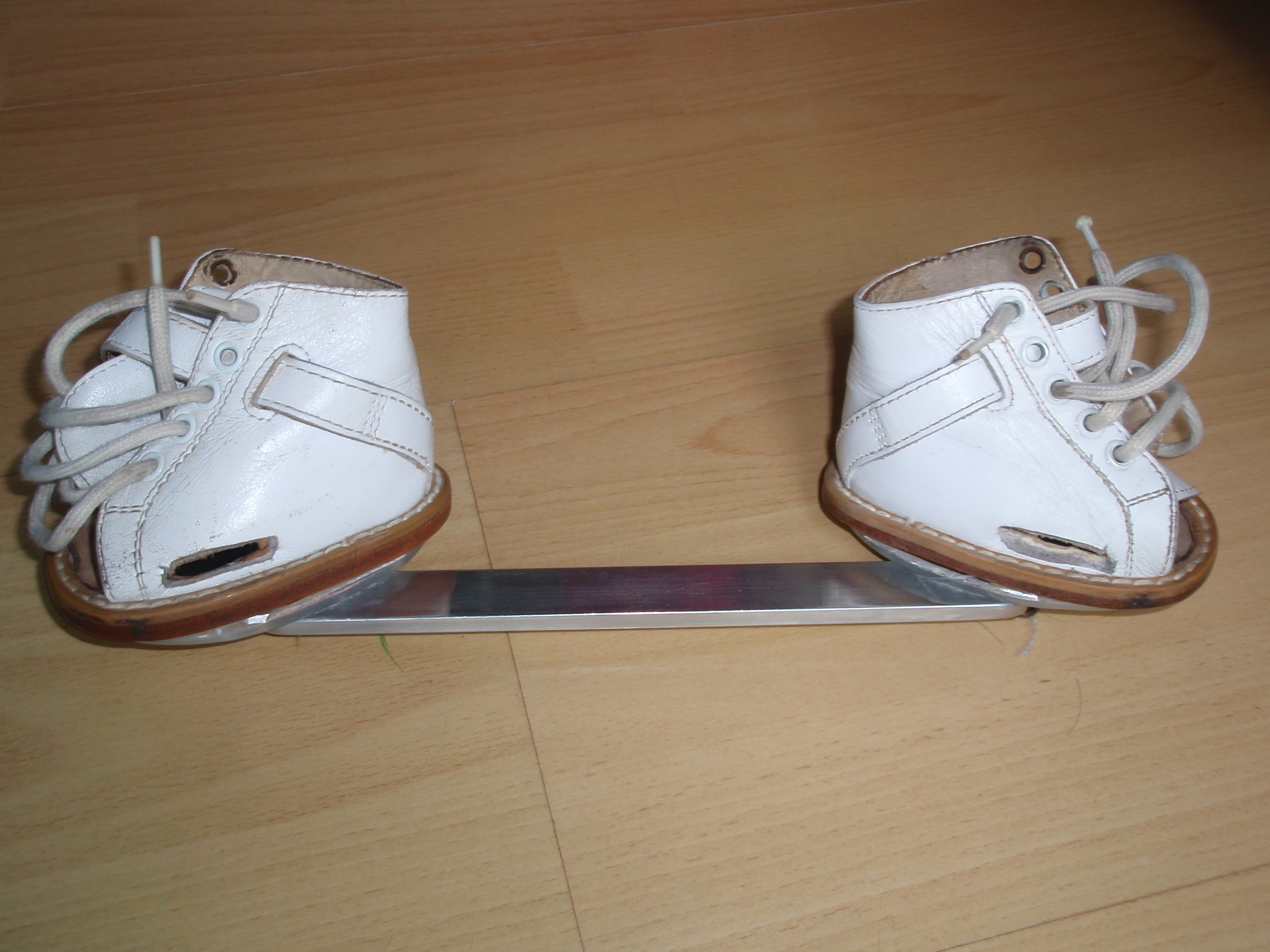
- Treatment of club foot
- Other names: Denis Browne splint
- Specialty: Orthopedic

The Denis Browne bar, also known as the Denis Browne splint or foot abduction orthosis, is a medical device used in the treatment of club foot. The device is named after Sir Denis Browne (1892–1967), an Australian-born surgeon at Great Ormond Street Hospital in London who was considered the father of pediatric surgery in the United Kingdom. Browne first described the device in 1934. The bar may be used as part of the Ponseti method, a series of nonsurgical techniques to address club foot.

== See also ==
- Orthotics
