= Lady Moyra Browne =

British nurse

Lady Moyra Browne DBE GCStJ
- Lady Moyra in 1946
- Born: Lady Moyra Blanche Madeleine Ponsonby; 2 March 1918; Marylebone, London, England
- Died: 4 December 2016 (aged 98)
- Spouses: Sir Denis John Wolko Browne (m. 1945; died 1967)
- Children: 2
- Parent(s): Vere Ponsonby, 9th Earl of Bessborough; Roberte Ponsonby, Countess of Bessborough
- Relatives: Frederick Ponsonby, 10th Earl of Bessborough (brother)

Lady Moyra Blanche Madeleine Browne DBE GCStJ (née Ponsonby; 2 March 1918 – 4 December 2016) was a British nurse and the only daughter of the 9th Earl of Bessborough, an Anglo-Irish peer, and his wife Roberte.

On 10 December 1945, she became the second wife of Sir Denis Browne (widower of Helen Simpson since 1940), a distinguished paediatric surgeon based at Great Ormond Street Hospital (GOSH) from 1922 to 1967. The Sir Denis Browne Gold Medal from the British Association of Paediatric Surgeons was named in his honour. After her husband's death in 1967, Lady Moyra was vice-president of the Royal College of Nursing from 1970 to 1985, Superintendent-in-Chief of St. John Ambulance from 1970 to 1983 and Governor of Research into Ageing from 1987 to 1989.

Lady Moyra and Sir Denis had two children, a son and a daughter. Her son was barrister Desmond John Michael Browne CBE QC (b. 1947), a former chairman of the bar of England and Wales.

== Death ==
Lady Moyra Browne died on 4 December 2016, aged 98, at her home. Her funeral, on 13 December, was at St Paul's Chapel, Stansted Park.

== Honours ==
- Dame Commander of the Order of the British Empire (1977)
- Dame Grand Cross of the Order of St John
