= Sylvester John Browne =

Australian mining magnate, adventurer and sportsman

Sylvester John Browne (1841 – 4 August 1915), occasionally referred to as Sylvester John Browne Jnr, was an Australian mining magnate, adventurer and sportsman, whose activities spanned practically the whole of Australia. He was a brother of the author Thomas Alexander Browne ("Rolf Boldrewood").

== History ==
Browne was born in Heidelberg, Colony of New South Wales in 1841 to Captain Sylvester John Browne (c. 1790-1864) and Eliza Angell Browne (c. 1813 – 8 November 1899, née Alexander). In 1830 Captain Browne, at one time a ship master of the East India Company, and his wife emigrated to New South Wales with their first son Thomas aboard the barque Proteus, of which he was owner and commander, first delivering his cargo of convicts to Tasmania. He built a home on the outskirts of Sydney which he named "Newtown House" hence, it has been asserted, the suburb of Newtown. In 1835 he built the "Enmore" mansion, for which that suburb was named. In 1840, following the severe drought of 1837–1839, Captain Browne and family moved to "Hartlands", Heidelberg, Victoria. In 1847, after threatening his son Thomas with a gun, he was declared a dangerous lunatic and committed to an institution. No later information has been found about Captain Browne; it may be that he died in the asylum.

Browne was presumably educated in the Colony of New South Wales but real information has been hard to find.

He spent his early years as a grazier in Queensland, at least from its splitting from New South Wales when he was about 18, holding Sandringham and other properties. He was appointed magistrate in Gympie 1876. He was a commission agent at Hillston, New South Wales in 1884.

== Horse racing ==
The Morphettville Racecourse had been resumed by the mortgagee in 1883 after its operator, the South Australian Jockey Club failed financially following the prohibition of the totalizator. Five years later restrictions on the totalizator were eased and Browne (with some input from T. F. Wigley) purchased the property and leased it, with option to purchase, to the reconstituted Club.

Browne was then involved with the Victorian Racing Club, and to a lesser extent the Victorian Amateur Turf Club. In 1888 he purchased four yearlings: Carrington (which he brought from South Australia), Tinlander, Loch and Hartlands, which he raced with only moderate success, and appears to have quit the game in 1891.

== Mining ==
Browne was a founder and local (Silverton? Adelaide?) director of the Broken Hill Junction Silver Mining Company (Limited) in 1886, and its largest shareholder, with 20,000 £1 shares. He resigned from the board in December 1892, as he had moved to Western Australia.

He was also a director of the Sterling Hill Silver Mining Company (whose chairman was one Henry Browne, relationship not found) in 1887.

He formed a company, of which he owned all but a few of the 24,000 £1 shares, to purchase the Bayley's Reward claim at Coolgardie, Western Australia from its finders Bayley and Ford. At its peak the mine was worth £480,000.

== Other interests ==
Browne was an excellent pigeon shooter and cricketer in his younger days; in later years he was a keen golfer, and he was a prime mover behind the Royal Melbourne Golf Club's acquisition of its course at Sandringham.

Browne died suddenly at "Garomna", a property he had recently purchased near Cloncurry, Queensland.

== Family ==
Captain Sylvester John Browne (years of birth and death not known) was married to Eliza Angell Browne, née Alexander (c. 1813 – 8 November 1899);

- Thomas Alexander Browne (1826–1915) married Margaret Maria Riley (died 8 September 1917) in 1860.

- Rose Christiana Angell Browne (1862–1935) author (as "Rose Boldrewood") of two novels
- Everard Browne (1864 – May 1926) married Muffle Chirnside of Werribee Park, Victoria. He was associated with his uncle Sylvester's mining ventures.
- Emma Margaret Browne married E. Henry Street on 1 June 1892. He was the third son of John Rendell Street MP of East Sydney and brother of Sir Philip Whistler Street (1863–1938).
- T(homas) Valentine Browne ( – 6 October 1909), metallurgist, assistant to his uncle Sylvester at Bayley's Reward gold mine.
- Emily Louisa Browne married Robert Silvers Black on 11 June 1903
- Gerald Macleay Browne, mining engineer, married Olive Isabel Smith on 22 May 1900. She was a daughter of Sir Gerard Smith, Governor of W.A.
- Annette Browne ( – ) married Robert George Massie (1815 - 13 September 1883). Cricketer Hugh Hamon Massie (1855–1936) was a son; Robert John Allwright Massie was a grandson.

- Emma Browne (c. 1828 – c. 5 March 1905) married Molesworth Greene of "Greystones", Bacchus Marsh. He was chairman of directors, South Broken Hill.
- (Elizabeth) Corientia Browne (c. 1828 – 10 October 1875) married William Walker, of "Redleaf", Double Bay in 1845; first Commodore of the Royal Sydney Yacht Squadron.
- fourth daughter Eliza Alexander Browne (1833 – 5 September 1910)
- fifth daughter Constance Browne (5 June 1837 – 23 August 1919) married James Tobin Cockshott (died 1867) of South Yarra, Victoria on 7 June 1860

- Harold Murray Cockshott (died 1940), barrister

- Lucy Forest Browne (1839 – 1913) married Frederick Darley (later Sir Frederick, Chief Justice of New South Wales) in Hunsdon, England on 13 December 1860. They had a summer residence Lilianfels, Katoomba.
- Sylvester John "Vessie" Browne (1841–1915) married Anna Catherine Stawell, eldest daughter of Sir William Stawell, on 17 October 1889.

- (Sylvester) Ulick Browne (4 September 1890 – 11 November 1964) born in Adelaide, married Monica Frances Little on 2 April 1918. He contested the seat of Kennedy in 1952, died in Ensay, Victoria.
- Sir Denis John Wolko Browne (2 April 1892 – 9 January 1967) married author and politician Helen Simpson in 1927
- Roderic Stawell "Pat" Browne (1894 – 28 June 1915), with 5th Light Horse in WWI, killed in action at the Dardanelles.
- Maureen Browne ( – )
- Diana Browne ( – ) unmarried as at 1937; companion to her mother.
- fourth son Sylvester Browne (c. 1900 "too young to be accepted for service" – )

- (Laura) Lilias Browne (1844 – 1917) married (Captain, later Major-General Sir) Peter Scratchley on 13 November 1862

== Arms ==
Coat of arms of Sylvester John Browne

Notes
Exemplified 25 March 1897 by Sir Arthur Edward Vicars, Ulster King of Arms.
Crest
On a wreath of the colours a lizard statant Vert debruised with a baton sinister Argent.
Escutcheon
Argent two lions rampant combatant supporting a dexter hand couped at the wrist all Gules in base a boat with oars in action Sable the whole within a bordure wavy of the second.
Motto
Fortuna Favet Fortibus
