= Charles A. Munn III =

American conservation biologist (born 1954)

Charles A Munn III (born in Baltimore, Maryland, on 3 December 1954) is an American conservation biologist and ecotourism entrepreneur. Munn is the founder and owner of SouthWild, a conservation-based ecotourism company that offers photographic safaris throughout South America. In 2013, Condé Nast Traveller listed him as one of worlds's three leading experts on wildlife tourism, and the only one for South America. From 1984 to 2000, he was a conservation field biologist with the Wildlife Conservation Society. He also founded Peru Verde Conservation Group, the BioBrasil Foundation, and Tropical Nature Conservation Group. Munn is an American citizen but spends most of his time in Brazil and Chile. He is based in Brazil's Mato Grosso state.

== Family ==
His paternal grandfather, Charles A. Munn was the owner of the American Totalisator Company and his paternal grandmother was Mary Astor Paul was one of many heirs to the Drexel banking fortune of Philadelphia, Pennsylvania. Munn's father, Charles A. Munn, Jr., died in 1957 of ALS at the age of 42. Munn married Martha Brecht in 1982; the couple separated in 1990 and divorced in 1992. Munn is currently separated from his second wife, conservation biologist Mariana Valqui.

== Academics ==
After graduating summa cum laude from Princeton, with a bachelor's degree in biology, in 1977, Munn went on to earn a master's degree in zoology at Oxford in 1979, then a PhD in evolutionary biology back at Princeton in 1984. Munn has authored a number of publications on his work in the Amazon basin.

== Hyacinth macaws ==
From 1984 until 2000, Munn was employed as a field scientist for the New York Zoological Society, researching wildlife in the Amazon basin of Peru, Bolivia, and Brazil. In 1987, Munn became the director of the Brazilian government's field survey of the hyacinth macaw, an endangered parrot species vulnerable to poaching to supply the exotic pet trade. The survey was also supported by Wildlife Conservation International, the New York Zoological Society, and the World Wildlife Fund.

In the field survey, Munn and his team were charged with exploring the Mato Grosso state of Brazil where hyacinth macaws were most heavily poached, and to speak to local families, business owners, and conservation officials about the future of the species. They found that the vast majority of locals were unhappy with the rapid decline of the species as a result of poaching, and that many had already resolved to not allow bird catchers on their land any longer. Perhaps surprisingly, Brazil's largest mining company, Companiha Vale de Rio Doce, was very helpful in arranging for the protection of the macaws. The team found that although the locals were extremely receptive to environmental awareness and conservation, hundreds of birds were still being trapped and traded every year. Munn's report recommended that the Brazilian government completely ban trade in the hyacinth macaw, warning that the species was likely to become extinct if action was not taken. Furthermore, Munn and his colleagues published a report for the Secretariat of the Convention International Trade in Endangered Species (CITES) of wild fauna and flora in 1987 (see selected publications), which led directly to the global trade ban of hyacinth macaws. Munn remains invested in the future of hyacinth macaws. He operates a lodge which protects a nesting population of hyacinths in the Brazilian Pantanal.

== Indigenous communities ==
Munn and his organization recognize the extreme difficulty that poverty presents as a roadblock to conservation. By instituting ecotourism networks that directly benefit indigenous communities, it is possible to create a more sustainable economy for such communities.

For example, while researching the biology of the scarlet macaw in the eastern Amazon, Munn was made aware of the constant onslaught that the species was subjected to as a result of the illegal pet trade. It became clear that their wilderness home would be quickly over-poached and that the species would suffer. Munn helped locals set up tours of clay licks near Peru's Manu National Park, where scarlet macaws gather to eat clay in order to detoxify the palm nuts they feed on.

The communities in Manu benefit from a sustainable and expanding ecotourism network. The ecotourism provides economic incentives to protect the area and its wildlife.

== Land protected ==
Between 1980 and 2000, Munn contributed to the creation and expansion of protection for several reserves and national parks in the Peruvian, Bolivian, and Ecuadorian Amazon.

- Tambopata National Reserve, Peru – The Tambopata Reserve encompasses a vast area in southeastern Peru including the Candamo River watershed. In the 1980s, working with Selva Sur and the Wildlife Conservation Society, Munn headed a group of biologists and naturalists that explored the Peruvian Amazon and cataloged its immense biodiversity and pristine, uninhabited rainforest. They drafted several arguments that urged the government to protect the ecologically valuable area, showing that the area contained an unprecedented amount of forest unspoiled by hunting and logging. Munn worked for years against the extraction interests, urging the government to protect the park. He made many enemies as a result, including a corrupt forest minister, and had to flee Peru at one point as a result of death threats. Finally, in 1990, the Tambopata National Reserve (Reserva Nacional Tambopata), constituting over 275,000 hectares of protected forest, was officially made a park. However, ExxonMobil attempted to push into Tambopata, and the president at the time, Alberto Fujimori, halved the size of the protected area as a result. However, Munn and his group of conservationists, including Argentinian filmmaker Daniel Winitzky, did not back down. Winitzky produced the documentary The Last Forest Without Man, which created a storm of public outrage against the proposed oil drilling. President Fujimori responded to public pressure in 2000 and increased the size of the park to over 1 million hectares. Ecotourism has since developed and contributes to the protection of Tambopata.
- Madidi National Park, Bolivia – Munn was involved in the designation of Madidi National Park in Bolivia, an area containing diverse ecosystems including glaciers, cloud forest, and over 1,000 recorded bird species. While working for the Wildlife Conservation Society in 1992 in Lima, Peru, Munn was hired by the Bolivian government as an international expert on protected areas to oversee the World Bank–financed restructuring of the Bolivian National Parks system. He was also asked by the government to recommend experts who could aid in the park's creation. After a long search, he discovered Rosa Maria Ruiz, a Bolivian activist from the non-profit EcoBolivia, who would aid him in investigating the region and interacting with the locals. The team worked for years to catalog the park's historical, cultural, and ecological value. Multiple organizations and non-profits also had a hand in the park's creation, including Conservation International. Madidi was established as a national park in 1995 by President Gonzalo Sanchez de Lozada; it encompasses over 1,800,000 hectares. The park had originally been proposed to protect a mere 50,000 hectares. Later, Munn and Ruiz were featured in a National Geographic cover story, "Madidi", by Steve Kemper in which Kemper, Munn, and Ruiz explored the park to assess possible ecotourism spots and interact with the indigenous Quechua-speaking people. Being located in one of the poorest countries in South America, the park held an enormous amount of potential in terms of and bringing jobs and infrastructure to locals.

== Selected publications ==
- Munn, C.A, and Terborgh, J. (1979) Multi-species territoriality in neo-tropical foraging flocks, Condor, 81, 338-347.
- Munn, C.A, (1985) Permanent canopy and understory flocks in Amazonia: species composition and population density, in P.A., Buckley, E.S. Morton, R.S. Ridgely and F.G. Buckely (eds.) Neotropical Ornithology, AOU Ornithological Monographs, 36, pp. 683–712.
- Munn, C.A, (1986) Birds that cry ‘wolf’, Nature, 319, pp. 143–145.
- Munn, C.A, J.B Thomsen, and C. Yamashita. (1987) Population survey and status of the hyacinth macaw (Andorynchus hyacinthinus) in Brazil, Bolivia, and Paraguay. Report to the secretariat of the convention on international trade in endangered species of wild fauna and flora. Lausanne, Switzerland.
- Terborgh J, Robinson S.K, Parker T.A, Munn C.A, (1990) Structure and organization of an Amazonia forest bird community, Ecological Monographs, 60:2, pp. 213–238.
- Munn, C.A, (1990) Tropical canopy netting and shooting lines over tall trees, Journal of Field Ornithology, 62:4, pp. 454–463.
- Oneil, J.P, Munn C.A, J. Franke, Irma, (1991) Nannopsittaca dachilleae, a new species of parrotlet from eastern Peru, The Auk, Vol. 81:2, pp. 225–229.
- Gilardi J.D., Duffy S.S., Munn C.A., Tell L.A. (1999) Biochemical functions of geophagy in parrots: detoxification of dietary toxins and cytoprotective effects. J Chem Ecol, 25, pp. 897–922.
