= American Aid Society =

Nonprofit organization

- Founded: March 1, 1945; 81 years ago
- Founder: Peter Max Wagner
- Purpose: the ethnic German refugee problem after WW2
- Headquarters: Chicago, U.S.
- Key people: Nick Pesch, President

The American Aid Society, formerly the American Aid Societies for Relief of the Needy and Displaced Persons of Central and Southeastern Europe, was a national organization dedicated to addressing the ethnic German refugee problem during and after WW2. It comprised 11 chapters across the country and was headquartered in Chicago. The society sent large relief shipments of food and clothing to Europe, facilitated the immigration and settling of thousands of refugees in the US, and lobbied the US government to take a more active role in addressing the humanitarian crisis, including by reforming immigration laws, especially the Displaced Persons Act of 1948. It was one of the largest such postwar relief societies, with membership numbering around 25,000 by the early 1950s.

== History ==
The closing stages of World War II saw mass, westward flight of ethnic German peoples from southeastern Europe as the Eastern Front closed in. As the stream of news, communiques, and letters from refugees to American relatives painted an increasingly dire situation, the need for a new non-governmental organization to organize aid on a large-scale became apparent. Peter Max Wagner was at the center of these efforts in New York and is credited with shepherding the society's founding. Organizers were careful to select an "assimilated" name that would not draw the ire of anti-German sentiment and, by 1945, the American Aid Society was assembling and sending shipments to refugee camps in Germany and Austria.

The situation worsened considerably with the advent of the Potsdam Agreement, one of whose points dealt with the "orderly and humane" relocation of certain populations. Southeastern Europe had many regions, for example the Banat, in which ethnically German peoples, generally referred to as Donauschwaben, lived. They were neither German nationals, nor were they covered under the humanitarian guidelines of the Agreement. This allowed for mass deportations for forced labor by the Soviet Union under the guise of war reparations and to Marshal Tito's concentration camps, as well as the expulsion of these peoples from their home countries, primarily Hungary, Yugoslavia, and Romania. Historian Alfred de Zayas estimates that roughly 15 million civilians were uprooted and about 2 million perished.

The United Nations International Refugee Organization also made a controversial decision to exclude Donauschwaben refugees from their relief operations, prompting American Aid Society to lobby the federal government to reform immigration laws. Both houses held hearings, at which President Nick Pesch and others from various chapters testified regarding deteriorating conditions in refugee camps in Germany and Austria and the Society's advocacy of increasing quotas for Donauschwaben refugee immigrants. President Truman was sympathetic, having met personally for discussions with Pesch, Wagner, and chapter leaders in 1952.

== Legacy ==
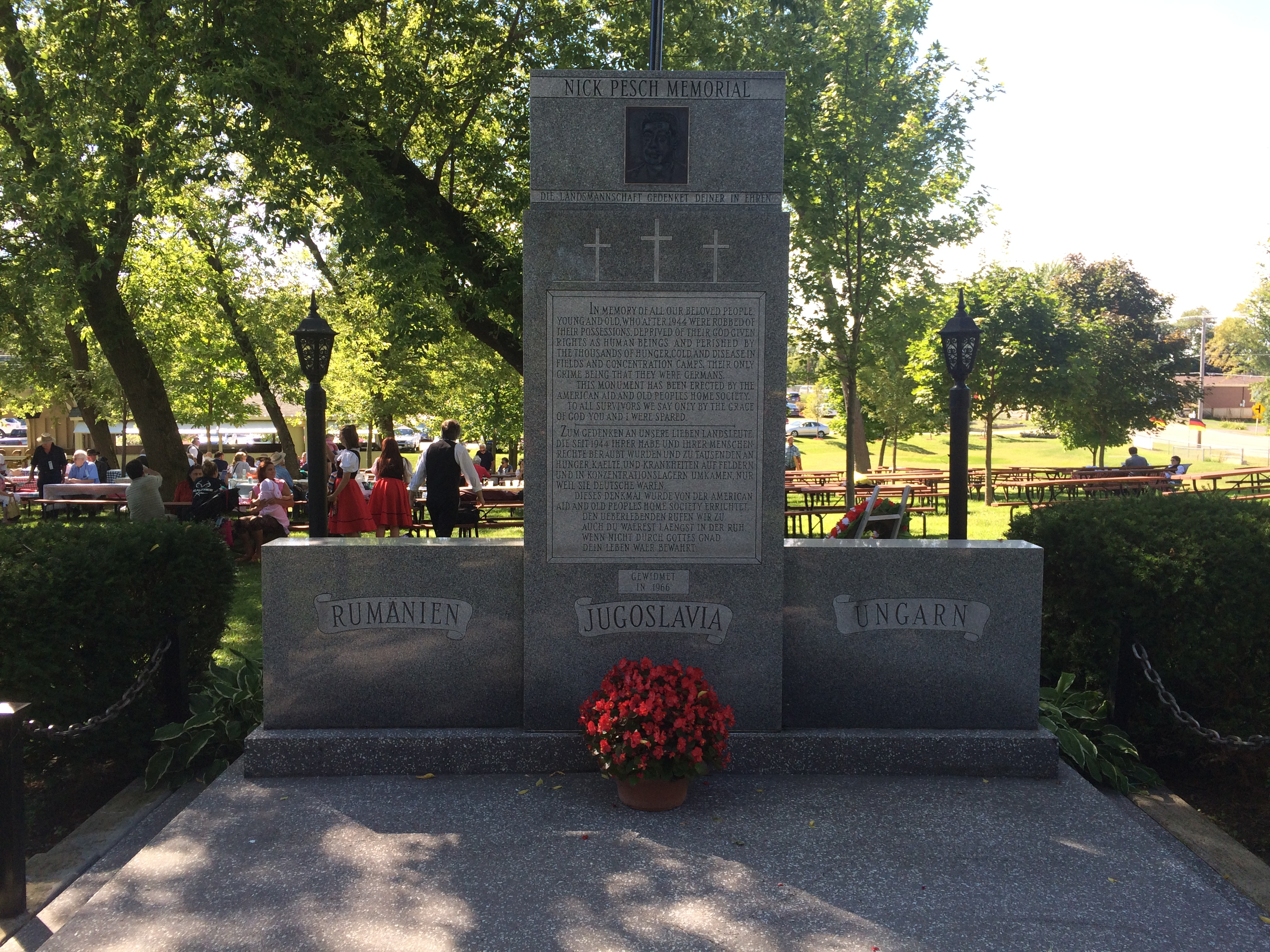
Nick Pesch monument

Aid work continued for more than 15 years, though the refugee census was declining, as communist countries completed repatriations of those remaining laborers still living. By the late 1960s, chapters were refocusing their interests on cultural and educational aspects and many continued on, rebranded with new names. For example, the American Aid Society St. Louis chapter was renamed the Deutscher Kulturverein (German Cultural Society) in 1969, the Akron Chapter became the Deutscher Familienverein (German Family Society), and the Chicago chapter became the American Aid Society of German Descendants. The latter erected a monument in 1966 dedicated to Nick Pesch in memory of the refugees and their plight at Lake Villa, Illinois.
