= Arthur Ponsonby, 11th Earl of Bessborough =

British peer

The Right Honourable The Earl of Bessborough
- Arms of Ponsonby: Gules, a chevron between three combs argent.

Member of the House of Lords (Note: As Baron Ponsonby of Sysonby.)
- Lord Temporal
- In office 1994 – 11 November 1999
- Preceded by: The 10th Earl of Bessborough
- Succeeded by: Seat abolished (Note: Pursuant to the House of Lords Act 1999.)

Personal details
- Born: Arthur Mountifort Longfield Ponsonby; 11 December 1912
- Died: 5 April 2002 (aged 89)
- Spouse(s): Patricia Minnigerode (m. 1939; died 1952) Anne Marie Galitzine (m. 1956; div. 1963) Madeleine Lola Margaret Grand (m. 1963)
- Children: 4
- Parents: Maj. Hon. Cyril Myles Brabazon Ponsonby; Rita Narcissa Longfield

Arthur Mountifort Longfield Ponsonby, 11th Earl of Bessborough (11 December 1912 – 5 April 2002), was a British peer.

He was the son of Maj. Hon. Cyril Myles Brabazon Ponsonby, second son of Edward Ponsonby, 8th Earl of Bessborough, and his wife Rita Narcissa Longfield, daughter of Lt. Col. Mountifort John Courtenay Longfield. He inherited the earldom on 5 December 1993 when his first cousin, Frederick Ponsonby, 10th Earl of Bessborough, died without a male heir.

== Education and career ==
He was educated at Harrow School and Trinity College, Cambridge. Later he rose to the rank of captain in the service of the Welsh Guards and saw action in the Second World War. In his later years he farmed at Roche Court, Winterslow, Wiltshire.

== Family ==
On 28 July 1939, he married Patricia Minnigerode (died 12 September 1952), daughter of Col. Fitzhugh Lee Minnigerode of New York and Alexandria, Virginia. Together they had two children:

- Hon. Myles Fitzhugh Longfield Ponsonby (born 16 February 1941), later 12th Earl of Bessborough
- Lady Sarah Ponsonby (13 October 1943 – 13 March 2010)

Following the death of his first wife, he remarried, on 20 September 1956, Anne Marie Galitzine (1916–2007; née von Slatin), former wife of Prince George Galitzine and daughter of Lt. Gen. Sir Rudolf Carl von Slatin (Baron von Slatin). They were divorced in 1963.

He married for the third time on 17 December 1963, Madeleine Lola Margaret Grand, daughter of Maj. Gen. Laurence Douglas Grand, and together they had two children:

- Hon. Matthew Douglas Longfield Ponsonby (born 27 January 1965), married Jamilie Emett Searle
- Hon. Charles Arthur Longfield Ponsonby (born 12 July 1967), married Jennifer Waghorn

Lady Bessborough is the founder of the New Art Centre, formerly of Sloane Street, London, which runs the New Art Centre Sculpture Park and Gallery at Roche Court, Wiltshire. She is a trustee of the Roche Court Educational Trust charity. She was awarded a CBE in the 2023 New Year's Honours list.

== Death and succession ==
He died on 5 April 2002 and was succeeded by his eldest son Myles Ponsonby, who became the 12th Earl of Bessborough.

== Ancestry ==
Ancestors of Arthur Ponsonby, 11th Earl of Bessborough

8. Walter Ponsonby, 7th Earl of Bessborough
4. Edward Ponsonby, 8th Earl of Bessborough
9. Lady Louisa Eliot
2. Maj. Hon. Myles Ponsonby
10. Sir John Guest, 1st Baronet
5. Blanche Guest
11. Lady Charlotte Bertie
1. Arthur Ponsonby, 11th Earl of Bessborough
12. Mountifort Longfield
6. Lt.Col. Mountifort Longfield
13. Caroline Augusta Courtenay
3. Rita Longfield
14. James Mason of Eynsham Hall
7. Alice Elizabeth Mason
15. Isabel Barry

== Arms ==
Coat of arms of Arthur Ponsonby, 11th Earl of Bessborough
Crest Out of a ducal coronet Azure three arrows one in pale and two in saltire points downward entwined by a snake Proper. Escutcheon Gules a chevron between three combs Argent. Supporters On either side a lion reguardant Proper. Motto Pro Rege Lege Grege (For king, law and people).

== Notes ==
Peerage of Ireland
Preceded by Frederick Ponsonby	Earl of Bessborough; 1993–2002	Succeeded by Myles Ponsonby
Preceded by Frederick Ponsonby	Viscount Duncannon; 1993–2002	Succeeded by Myles Ponsonby
Preceded by Frederick Ponsonby	Baron Bessborough; 1993–2002	Succeeded by Myles Ponsonby
Peerage of Great Britain
Preceded by Frederick Ponsonby	Baron Ponsonby of Sysonby; 1993–2002; Member of the House of Lords (1994–1999)	Succeeded by Myles Ponsonby
Peerage of the United Kingdom
Preceded by Frederick Ponsonby	Baron Duncannon; 1993–2002	Succeeded by Myles Ponsonby
