= Vere Ponsonby, 9th Earl of Bessborough =

British politician and Governor General of Canada (1880–1956)

The Right Honourable The Earl of Bessborough GCMG KStJ PC
- Bessborough c. 1935

14th Governor General of Canada
- In office 4 April 1931 – 2 November 1935
- Monarch: George V
- Prime Minister: Canadian • R. B. Bennett • W. L. M. King; British • Ramsay MacDonald
- Preceded by: The Earl of Willingdon
- Succeeded by: The Lord Tweedsmuir

Member of the House of Lords
- Lord Temporal
- In office 1 December 1920 – 10 March 1956
- Preceded by: The 8th Earl of Bessborough
- Succeeded by: The 10th Earl of Bessborough

Personal details
- Born: 27 October 1880 London, England
- Died: 10 March 1956 (aged 75) Stoughton, Sussex, England
- Spouse: Roberte Poupart de Neuflize (m. 1912)
- Children: Frederick Ponsonby, 10th Earl of Bessborough; Hon. Desmond Neuflize Ponsonby; Lady Moyra Browne; Hon. George St. Lawrence Neuflize Ponsonby
- Parent(s): Edward Ponsonby, 8th Earl of Bessborough; Blanche Vere Guest
- Profession: Diplomat, businessman, and parliamentarian

Military service
- Allegiance: United Kingdom
- Branch/service: British Army
- Years of service: 1914–1919
- Rank: Second Lieutenant; Captain; Major
- Unit: Royal Buckinghamshire Yeomanry; Suffolk Yeomanry
- Battles/wars: First World War: Battle of Gallipoli; Western Front

Vere Brabazon Ponsonby, 9th Earl of Bessborough (27 October 1880 – 10 March 1956), was an Anglo-Irish businessman and politician who served as Governor General of Canada, the fourteenth since Canadian Confederation.

Born and educated in England into 'the Ascendancy', the Anglo-Irish aristocracy, he graduated with a law degree from Cambridge University. In 1910 he became a member of the London County Council and a member of the British House of Commons. Upon the death of his father ten years later, Ponsonby succeeded as Earl of Bessborough and took his seat in the House of Lords. In 1931 he was appointed as governor general by King George V, on the recommendation of British prime minister Ramsay MacDonald, to replace The Earl of Willingdon as viceroy. He occupied the post until succeeded by the Lord Tweedsmuir in 1935. Lord Bessborough is remembered for promoting new communication technologies as well as giving support to Canadians during the Great Depression.

After the end of his viceregal tenure, he returned to London, where he continued in business and worked with the Dominions Office and the Foreign Office before his death in March 1956.

Ponsonby was the last Earl of Bessborough to own Bessborough House, the Ponsonby family's ancestral seat near the village of Piltown in the south of County Kilkenny in Ireland. The country house was primarily built in the 1740s for the 1st Earl. It was gutted by fire during the Irish Civil War in February 1923. Ponsonby had the house rebuilt in the late 1920s. However, he sold the house in the late 1930s as he primarily lived in Britain. The house now forms the central part of Kildalton Agricultural College.

== Early life and education ==
Ponsonby was born in London, the first son and third child of Edward, 8th Earl of Bessborough, and his wife Blanche. Her father, Sir Josiah Guest, was a great-uncle of Sir Winston Churchill. Ponsonby attended Harrow School before going up to Trinity College, Cambridge, in 1898, graduating three years later with a Bachelor of Arts degree. In 1903, he began a career in law, being called to the Bar at the Inner Temple. After his father succeeded as Earl of Bessborough in 1906, Ponsonby used the courtesy title of Viscount Duncannon.

== Career ==
In 1907, the young Viscount Duncannon (as he then was) entered politics, being elected to a seat on the London County Council. He remained at that post until running in the January 1910 general election and winning a seat in the British House of Commons as the Member of Parliament (MP) for Cheltenham. He lost that seat in the election of 19 December that same year, but re-entered the Commons in 1913 as the MP for Dover.

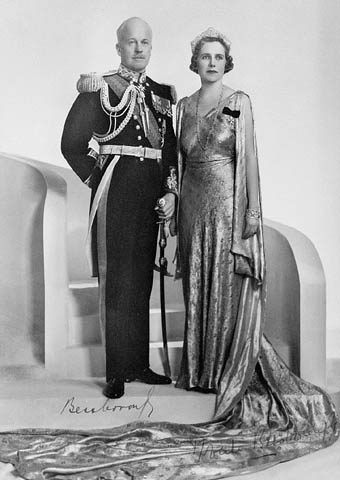
The Earl of Bessborough and his wife Roberte, 1933

When the First World War broke out and, while retaining his parliamentary seat, Lord Duncannon joined the army. He was commissioned as a second lieutenant in Royal Buckinghamshire Yeomanry. On 11 November 1914, he transferred to the Suffolk Hussars (both units were part of the Territorial Force and were sent into action overseas), where he was later appointed captain and promoted to acting major. He served at Gallipoli in 1915 and, from 1916 to 1918, on the military staff in France. During his wartime service, he was mentioned in dispatches, awarded the Croix de chevalier of the French Legion of Honour, and appointed to the Italian Order of St Maurice and St Lazarus, the Belgian Order of Leopold II, Greece's Order of the Redeemer, as well as a Third Class Member of the Russian Order of St Anna. After the war, Lord Duncannon was appointed a Companion of the Order of St. Michael and St. George in the 1919 New Year Honours List.

After the death of his father on 1 December 1920, he succeeded to the Irish earldom of Bessborough, requiring him to resign his seat in the House of Commons and enter the House of Lords. On 17 December, he applied to be Crown Steward and Bailiff of the Three Hundreds of Chiltern. The Earl had a successful business career, holding directorships in several large commercial firms, including acting as head of both the São Paulo Railway and the Margarine Union, as well as deputy chairman of De Beers Consolidated Mines. On 8 April 1925 his ten-year-old second son, D. N. Ponsonby, was thrown from a horse and killed while riding at Stansted Park.

== Governor General of Canada ==
It was announced in early 1931 that King George V had, by commission under the royal sign-manual and signet, appointed Lord Bessborough as his representative. The appointment was made on the recommendation of British prime minister Ramsay MacDonald, with input from Prime Minister of Canada R. B. Bennett. It came as somewhat of a surprise, as Bessborough was the only businessman to have ever been appointed Governor General.

After being admitted into the Privy Council of the United Kingdom on 20 March 1931, Lord Bessborough travelled to Canada and was sworn in as Governor General on 4 April, amid the Great Depression. In his travels around Canada, Bessborough witnessed the struggles of Canadians during the Depression. He praised their tenacity. In Shawbridge, Quebec, he stated in a speech: "There is nothing more encouraging and cheering than the calm steady way Canadians have pursued their daily tasks during the difficult period with a supreme faith in the destiny of their country". As a sign of his sympathy with the majority of the populace, he gave up 10% of his salary.

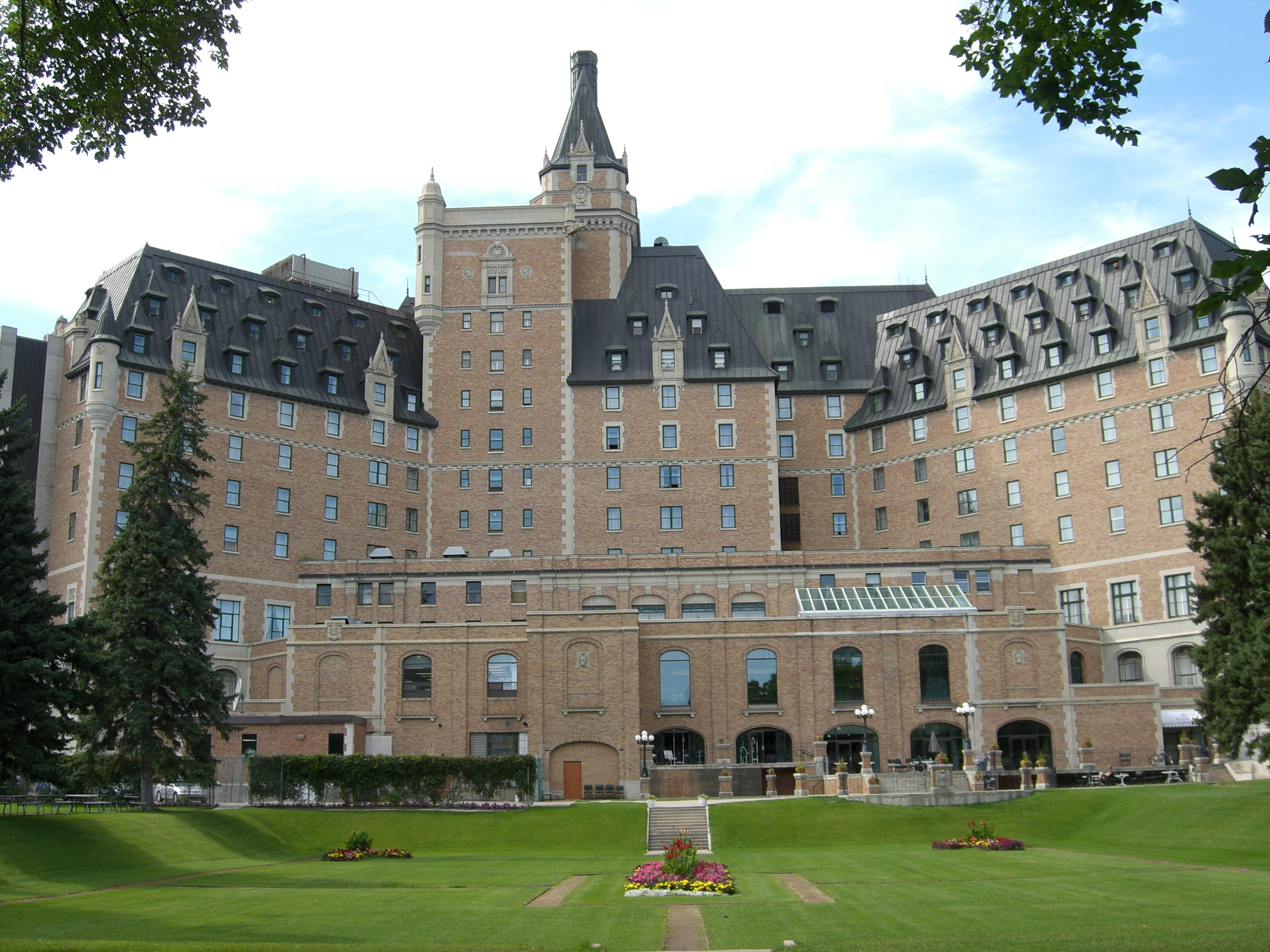
The Delta Bessborough Hotel, Saskatoon

Despite the economic situation, Canada was gaining international stature, and Lord Bessborough acted as host to the leaders who, in July 1932, converged on Ottawa for the Imperial Economic Conference. He also presided over the opening of the Welland Canal the same year. The Governor General welcomed many foreign dignitaries, including Prince Takamatsu and his wife, Princess Takamatsu; King Rama VII of Siam and his consort, Queen Ramphaiphanni; and Winston Churchill, then a British Member of Parliament. Several technological firsts took place during Bessborough's tenure: his installation ceremony was the first to be broadcast by radio; in 1932, from the Governor General's study at Rideau Hall, he inaugurated the first trans-Canada telephone line by calling each of the lieutenant governors; and, as Governor-in-Council, he created the Canadian Broadcasting Corporation (the CBC). Lord Bessborough was also the first Canadian viceroy to fly the new standard dedicated to that office, created in 1931.

Bessborough's time as Governor General coincided with the King's Silver Jubilee celebrations in May 1935. During the celebrations, he launched the King's Jubilee Cancer Fund with a radio broadcast from Rideau Hall. Also, he initiated a campaign to increase the membership of the Scouts. However, the most prominent mark that Bessborough left in Canada was the Dominion Drama Festival. He developed the festival with the assistance of future Governor-General Vincent Massey and Henry C. Osborne. The festival was first held in April 1933 and awarded the Bessborough Trophy to the best amateur theatrical company in the country.

== Post-viceregal life ==
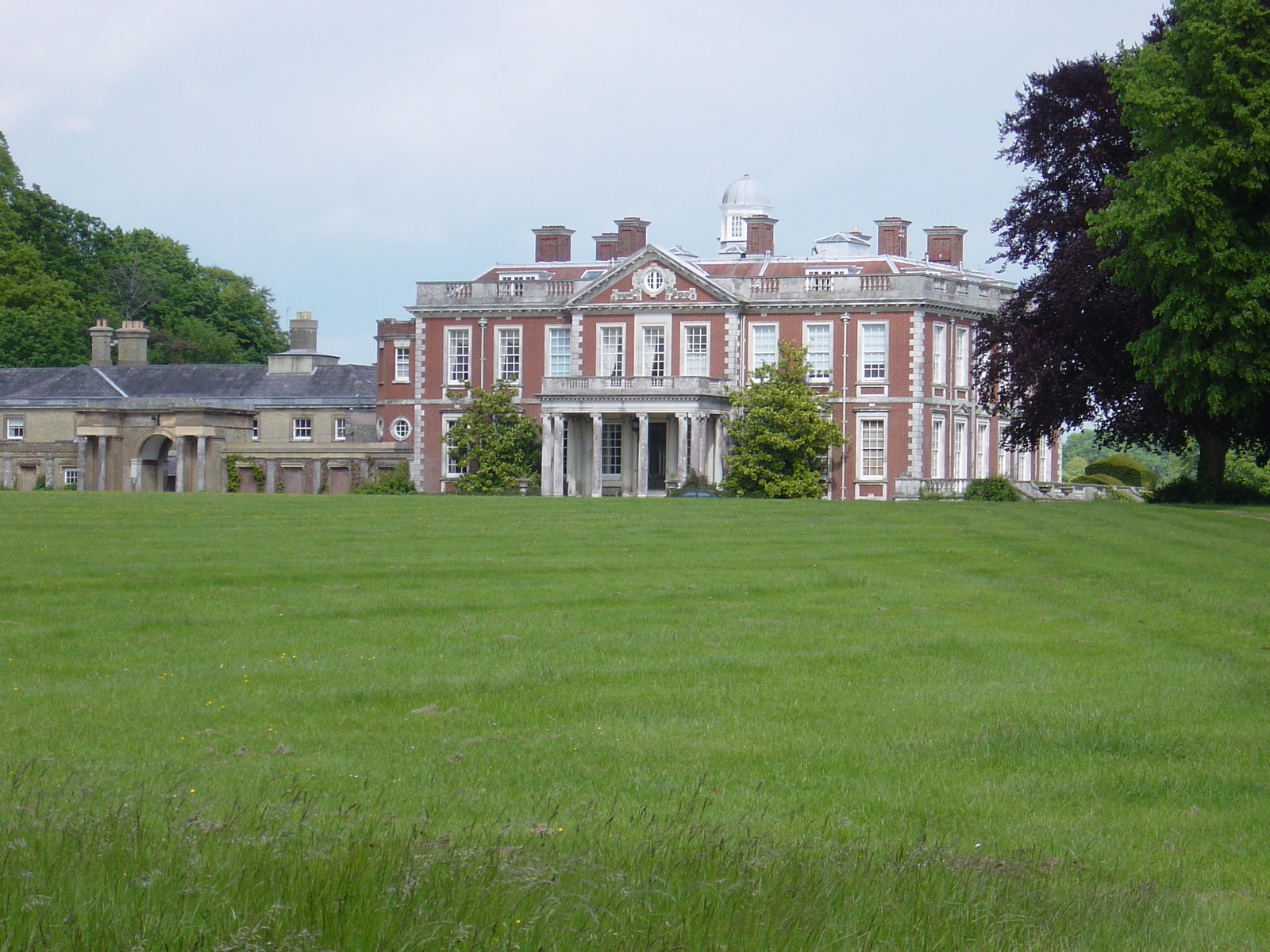
Stansted House, near Chichester, Sussex, was purchased by Lord Bessborough in 1924

After life in Canada, Lord Bessborough returned to London and his businesses. His activities were not all business-related. During the Second World War, Bessborough helped establish a department in the British Foreign Office dedicated to the welfare of French refugees in the United Kingdom.

In 1956, the Earl returned once more to Canada, staying at Rideau Hall as a guest of the then-Governor General, Vincent Massey. He died the following year at the country house he purchased in 1924, Stansted House.

== Honours ==
Viceregal styles of The Earl of Bessborough (1931–1935)
- Reference style: His Excellency The Right Honourable; Son Excellence le très honourable
- Spoken style: Your Excellency; Votre Excellence

Appointments

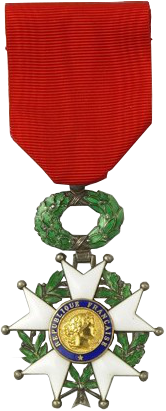
Légion d'honneur insignia

- (United Kingdom) 1 January 1919 – 13 February 1931: Companion of the Most Distinguished Order of Saint Michael and Saint George (CMG)
  - (United Kingdom) 13 February 1931 – 10 March 1956: Knight Grand Cross of the Most Distinguished Order of Saint Michael and Saint George (GCMG)
- (United Kingdom) 22 June 1934 – 10 March 1956: Knight of Justice of the Most Venerable Order of Saint John (KStJ)
- (United Kingdom) 20 March 1931 – 10 March 1956: Member of His Majesty's Most Honourable Privy Council (PC)
- 4 April 1931 – 2 November 1935: Chief Scout for Canada
- 4 April 1931 – 2 November 1935: Honorary Member of the Royal Military College of Canada Club

Medals

- (United Kingdom) 1919: 1914–15 Star
- (United Kingdom) 1919: British War Medal
- (United Kingdom) 1919: Victory Medal
- (Canada) 1935: King George V Silver Jubilee Medal
- (Canada) 1937: King George VI Coronation Medal

Foreign honours

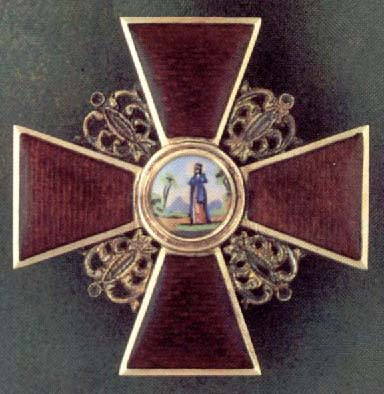
Member, Order of St. Anna insignia

- (France) 25 September 1917: Croix de Chevalier, Legion of Honor
- (Russia) 17 October 1917: Member, Third Class with Swords of the Order of St. Anna
- (Greece) 24 October 1919: Officer, Order of the Redeemer
- (Italy) : Member of the Order of St. Maurice and St. Lazarus
- (Belgium) : Member of the Order of Leopold II
- (France) : Médaille de la Reconnaissance française

=== Honorary military appointments ===
- (Canada) 4 April 1931 – 2 November 1935: Colonel of the Governor General's Horse Guards
- (Canada) 4 April 1931 – 2 November 1935: Colonel of the Governor General's Foot Guards
- (Canada) 4 April 1931 – 2 November 1935: Colonel of the Canadian Grenadier Guards

=== Honorary degrees ===
- (Canada) 1932: University of Alberta, Doctor of Laws (LLD)
- (Canada) : University of Toronto, Doctor of Laws (LLD)
- (Canada) : University of Ottawa, Doctor of Laws (LLD)
- (Canada) : McGill University, Doctor of Laws (DCL)

=== Honorific eponyms ===
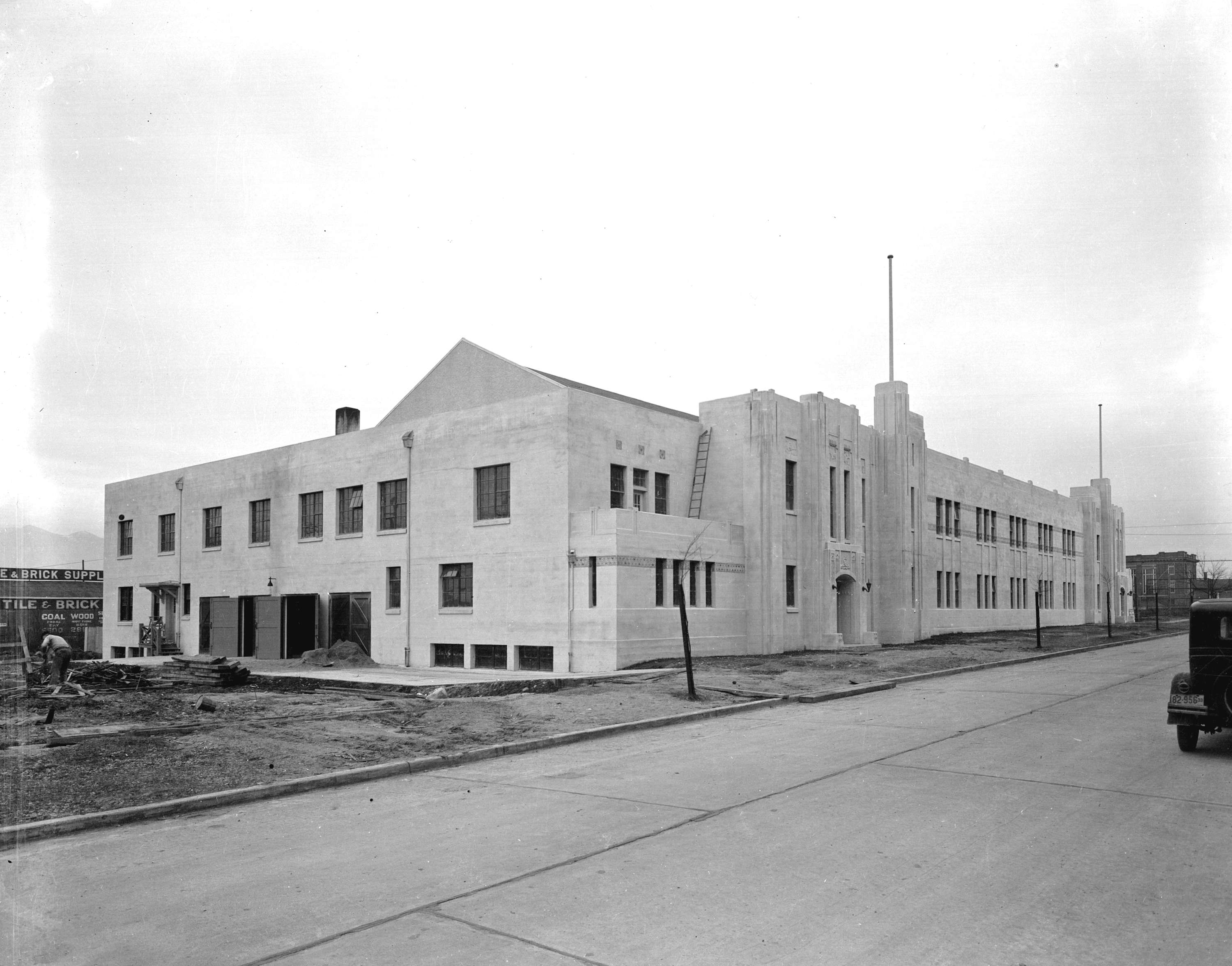
Bessborough Armoury, Vancouver

Awards

- Canada: Bessborough Trophy (renamed Calvert Trophy)

Buildings

- British Columbia: Bessborough Armoury, Vancouver
- Saskatchewan: Delta Bessborough, Saskatoon

Schools

- Alberta: Bessborough Hall, Clear Water Academy, Calgary
- New Brunswick: Bessborough School, Moncton

=== Arms ===
Coat of arms of Vere Ponsonby, 9th Earl of Bessborough
Crest Out of a ducal coronet Azure three arrows one in pale and two in saltire points downward entwined by a snake Proper. Escutcheon Gules a chevron between three combs Argent. Supporters On either side a lion reguardant Proper. Motto Pro Rege Lege Grege (For king, law and people). Orders The Most Distinguished Order of St. Michael and St. George - Knight Grand Cross (GCMG).

== Ancestry ==
Ancestors of Vere Ponsonby, 9th Earl of Bessborough

8. John Ponsonby, 4th Earl of Bessborough
4. Walter Ponsonby, 7th Earl of Bessborough
9. Lady Maria Fane
2. Edward Ponsonby, 8th Earl of Bessborough
10. Edward Eliot, 3rd Earl of St Germans
5. Lady Louisa Eliot
11. Lady Jemima Cornwallis
1. Vere Ponsonby, 9th Earl of Bessborough
12. Thomas Guest
6. Sir John Guest, 1st Baronet
13. Jemima Phillips
3. Blanche Guest
14. Albemarle Bertie, 9th Earl of Lindsey
7. Lady Charlotte Bertie
15. Charlotte Susannah Elizabeth Layard

Government offices
Preceded by The Earl of Willingdon	Governor General of Canada; 1931–1935	Succeeded by The Lord Tweedsmuir
Parliament of the United Kingdom
Preceded by John Sears	Member of Parliament for Cheltenham; Jan 1910 – Dec 1910	Succeeded by Richard Mathias
Preceded by George Wyndham	Member of Parliament for Dover; 1913–1920	Succeeded by Sir Thomas Polson
Peerage of Ireland
Preceded by Edward Ponsonby	Earl of Bessborough; 1st creation 1920–1956	Succeeded by Frederick Ponsonby
Preceded by Edward Ponsonby	Viscount Duncannon; 1920–1956	Succeeded by Frederick Ponsonby
Preceded by Edward Ponsonby	Baron Bessborough; 1920–1956	Succeeded by Frederick Ponsonby
Peerage of Great Britain
Preceded by Edward Ponsonby	Baron Ponsonby of Sysonby; 1920–1956	Succeeded by Frederick Ponsonby
Peerage of the United Kingdom
Preceded by Edward Ponsonby	Baron Duncannon; 1920–1956; Member of the House of Lords (1920–1956)	Succeeded by Frederick Ponsonby
New creation	Earl of Bessborough; 2nd creation 1937–1956	Succeeded by Frederick Ponsonby
