= Frederick Ponsonby, 10th Earl of Bessborough =

British diplomat and peer (1913–1993)

The Right Honourable The Earl of Bessborough DL
- Earl Bessborough in 1956

Member of the European Parliament
- In office 1973–1979

Member of the House of Lords
- Lord Temporal
- In office 10 March 1956 – 5 December 1993
- Preceded by: The 9th Earl of Bessborough
- Succeeded by: The 11th Earl of Bessborough (Note: As Baron Ponsonby of Sysonby.)

Personal details
- Born: Frederick Edward Neuflize Ponsonby; 29 March 1913
- Died: 5 December 1993 (aged 80)
- Party: Conservative
- Spouse: Mary Munn (m. 1948)
- Relations: Jean de Neuflize (grandfather)
- Children: Lady Charlotte Ponsonby
- Parent(s): Vere Ponsonby, 9th Earl of Bessborough; Roberte Poupart de Neuflize
- Education: Eton College
- Alma mater: Trinity College, Cambridge

Frederick Edward Neuflize "Eric" Ponsonby, 10th Earl of Bessborough (29 March 1913 – 5 December 1993), styled Viscount Duncannon from 1920 to 1956, was a British diplomat, businessman, playwright, Conservative politician, and peer.

== Early life ==
Ponsonby was the eldest and only surviving son of Vere Ponsonby, 9th Earl of Bessborough, and his wife, the former Roberte Poupart de Neuflize, only daughter of Baron Jean de Neuflize, a Parisian banker. His father was an Anglo-Irish businessman and politician who graduated with a law degree from Cambridge University before entering politics as a member of the London County Council and then, in 1910, as a member of the British House of Commons, later serving as Governor General of Canada.

He was educated at Eton and Trinity College, Cambridge.

== Career ==
He was on the Staff of the League of Nations High Commission for Refugees from Germany between 1936 and 1939. In 1938, he attended the Évian Conference as secretary to the High Commissioner Sir Neill Malcolm.

During the Second World War he served in France and West and North Africa, achieving the rank of captain in the 98th (Surrey and Sussex Yeomanry) Field Regiment of the Royal Artillery (TA Reserve). From 1944 to 1948 Bessborough was 2nd Secretary at the British Embassy in Paris and from 1948 to 1949 1st Secretary. He then worked for Robert Benson, Lonsdale & Co, Ltd, merchant bankers, between 1950 and 1956 and was a director of ATV Ltd between 1955 and 1963.

Bessborough succeeded to his father's two earldoms in 1956 and took his seat on the Conservative benches in the House of Lords. He served under Sir Alec Douglas-Home as Parliamentary Secretary for Science from 1963 to 1964 and as Joint Under-Secretary of State for Education and Science in 1964 and under Edward Heath as Minister of State at the Ministry of Technology in 1970. From 1973 to 1979 he was a Member of the European Parliament. He also served as a Deputy Lieutenant of West Sussex in 1977 and was the author of plays and other works. He was elected to the American Philosophical Society in 1988.

== Personal life ==
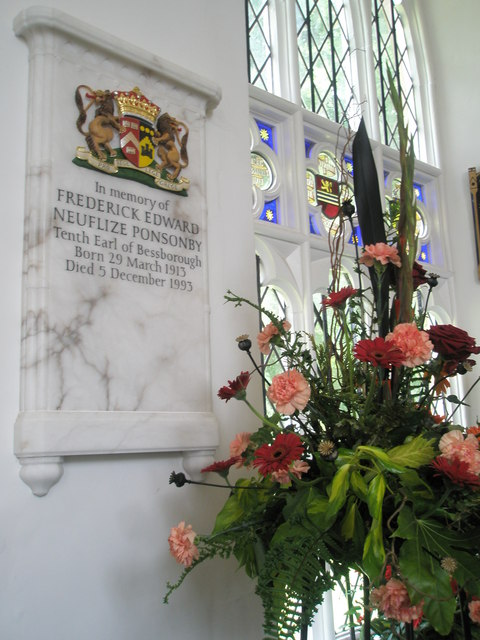
Memorial in Stansted Park

In August 1948, his engagement to American heiress Mary Munn (1915–2013) was announced. The couple met in Paris where Lord Bessborough, then Viscount Duncannon, was attached to the British Embassy and his future wife was working for the Red Cross. Mary was the daughter of Charles A. Munn Jr. and Mary Astor Paul (a granddaughter of Philadelphia banker Anthony Drexel). They married on 29 September 1948, and were the parents of one daughter, Lady Charlotte Mary Roberte Paul Ponsonby (b. 1949), an art gallery owner who married Yanni Petsopoulos in 1974, and the couple has one son, Eric.

Lord Bessborough died in December 1993, aged 80, when the earldom of Bessborough created in the Peerage of the United Kingdom for his father in 1937 became extinct. He was succeeded in the Irish earldom of Bessborough and the remaining family titles by his first cousin, Arthur Ponsonby.

== Ancestry ==
Ancestors of Frederick Ponsonby, 10th Earl of Bessborough

8. Walter Ponsonby, 7th Earl of Bessborough
4. Edward Ponsonby, 8th Earl of Bessborough
9. Lady Louisa Eliot
2. Vere Ponsonby, 9th Earl of Bessborough
10. Sir John Guest, 1st Baronet
5. Blanche Guest
11. Lady Charlotte Bertie
1. Frederick Ponsonby, 10th Earl of Bessborough
12. Jean André Poupart de Neuflize, 2nd Baron of Neuflize
6. Jean Frédéric Poupart de Neuflize, 3rd Baron of Neuflize
13. Marie Louise André
3. Roberte Poupart de Neuflize
14. Mathieu Dollfus
7. Madeleine Dollfus-Davillier
15. Laure Cécile Davillier

== Arms ==
Coat of arms of Frederick Ponsonby, 10th Earl of Bessborough
Crest Out of a ducal coronet Azure three arrows one in pale and two in saltire points downward entwined by a snake Proper. Escutcheon Gules a chevron between three combs Argent. Supporters On either side a lion reguardant Proper. Motto Pro Rege Lege Grege (For king, law and people).

== Notes ==
Political offices
New office	Joint Under-Secretary of State for Education and Science; 1964; With: Christopher Chataway	Succeeded by James Boyden; Denis Howell
Preceded by Sir John Eden	Minister of State at the Ministry of Technology; 1970	Office abolished
Peerage of Ireland
Preceded by Vere Ponsonby	Earl of Bessborough; 1st creation 1956–1993	Succeeded by Arthur Ponsonby
Preceded by Vere Ponsonby	Viscount Duncannon; 1956–1993	Succeeded by Arthur Ponsonby
Preceded by Vere Ponsonby	Baron Bessborough; 1956–1993	Succeeded by Arthur Ponsonby
Peerage of Great Britain
Preceded by Vere Ponsonby	Baron Ponsonby of Sysonby; 1956–1993	Succeeded by Arthur Ponsonby
Peerage of the United Kingdom
Preceded by Vere Ponsonby	Earl of Bessborough; 2nd creation 1956–1993; Member of the House of Lords (1956–1993)	Extinct
Preceded by Vere Ponsonby	Baron Duncannon; 1956–1993	Succeeded by Arthur Ponsonby
