= Edward Ponsonby, 8th Earl of Bessborough =

British peer (1851–1920)

The Right Honourable The Earl of Bessborough KP CB CVO
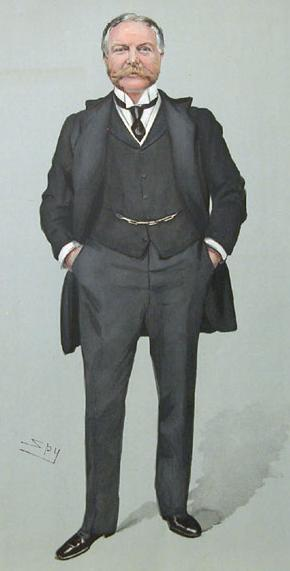
- The then Viscount Duncannon, by Leslie Ward, 1904
- Born: 1 March 1851
- Died: 1 December 1920 (aged 69)
- Spouse: Blanche Vere Guest (m. 1875; died 1919)
- Issue: Lady Olwen Verena Ponsonby; Lady Helen Blanche Irene Ponsonby; Vere Ponsonby, 9th Earl of Bessborough; Hon. Cyril Myles Brabazon Ponsonby; Hon. Bertie Brabazon Ponsonby; Hon. Bertie Brabazon Ponsonby
- Father: Walter Ponsonby, 7th Earl of Bessborough
- Mother: Lady Louisa Susan Cornwallis Eliot

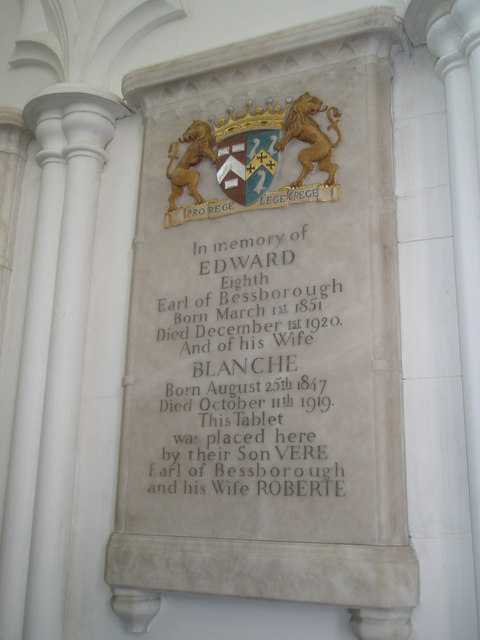
Memorial in the chapel at Stansted Park

Edward Ponsonby, 8th Earl of Bessborough, KP, CB, CVO (1 March 1851 – 1 December 1920), known as Viscount Duncannon from 1895 until 1906, was a British peer.

== Background ==
Ponsonby was the eldest son of Reverend Walter Ponsonby, 7th Earl of Bessborough, and his wife, Louisa, daughter of Edward Eliot, 3rd Earl of St Germans.

== Career ==
He qualified as a barrister in 1879 and was secretary to Lord Robert Grosvenor (a younger son of Hugh Grosvenor, 1st Duke of Westminster) at HM Treasury from 1880 to 1884 and to Arthur Peel, Speaker of the House of Commons, from 1884 to 1895. After Peel's retirement in 1895, Ponsonby was appointed a Companion of the Order of the Bath (CB). He also took the courtesy title of Viscount Duncannon following his father's accession to the earldom of Bessborough, also in that year. In 1898, he was High Sheriff of Carlow. He was appointed a Commander of the Royal Victorian Order (CVO) on 11 August 1902, and a Knight of the Order of St Patrick (KP) in 1914. He was also involved in business and became a director of the London, Brighton and South Coast Railway in March 1895, and served as its chairman from February 1908 until his death.

== Family ==
On 22 April 1875, Ponsonby married Blanche Guest (1847–1919), the sister of Lady Layard and Ivor Guest, 1st Baron Wimborne, and they had six children:

- Lady Olwen Verene (1876–1927), married Geoffrey Browne, 3rd Baron Oranmore and Browne.
- Lady Helen Blanche Irene (1878–1962), married John Congreve (1872–1957) and settled at Mount Congreve estate in County Waterford, Ireland.
- Vere Brabazon, later styled Viscount Duncannon, later 9th Earl of Bessborough (1880–1956), Governor General of Canada.
- Hon. (Cyril) Myles Brabazon (1881–1915), soldier and father of the 11th Earl of Bessborough.
- Hon. Bertie Brabazon (1885–1967), barrister and soldier.
- Lady Gweneth Frida (1888–1984), married (1) Hon. Windham Baring, (2) Ralph Cavendish.

Ponsonby inherited the earldom from his father in 1906, and on his death in 1920, his titles passed to his eldest son, Vere. His death procured an erroneous obituary of Lord Desborough being published after The Times confused the two peers.

== Arms ==
Coat of arms of Edward Ponsonby, 8th Earl of Bessborough
Crest Out of a ducal coronet Azure three arrows one in pale and two in saltire points downward entwined by a snake Proper. Escutcheon Gules a chevron between three combs Argent. Supporters On either side a lion reguardant Proper. Motto Pro Rege Lege Grege (For king, law and people). Orders The Most Illustrious Order of St. Patrick - Knight (KP).

Business positions
Preceded by Lord Cottesloe	Chairman of the Board of Directors of the London, Brighton and South Coast Railway; 1908–1920	Succeeded by Charles C. Macrae
Peerage of Ireland
Preceded by Walter Ponsonby	Earl of Bessborough; 1906–1920	Succeeded by Vere Ponsonby
Preceded by Walter Ponsonby	Viscount Duncannon; 1906–1920	Succeeded by Vere Ponsonby
Preceded by Walter Ponsonby	Baron Bessborough; 1906–1920	Succeeded by Vere Ponsonby
Peerage of Great Britain
Preceded by Walter Ponsonby	Baron Ponsonby of Sysonby; 1906–1920	Succeeded by Vere Ponsonby
Peerage of the United Kingdom
Preceded by Walter Ponsonby	Baron Duncannon; 1906–1920	Succeeded by Vere Ponsonby
