= Emily Ponsonby =

Victorian novelist

- Born: 1817; London, England
- Died: 1877 (aged 59–60); London, England
- Father: John Ponsonby
- Relatives: John Ponsonby (brother); Frederick Ponsonby (brother); Walter Ponsonby (brother); Spencer Ponsonby-Fane (brother)
- Writing career
- Genre: Romance
- Subject: Upper classes of England

Lady Emily Charlotte Mary Ponsonby (1817–1877) was a Victorian novelist.

== Life ==
Lady Emily Charlotte Mary Ponsonby was born in London in 1817. Her father was John Ponsonby, 4th Earl of Bessborough, who was briefly Home Secretary in 1834. Her aunt was Lady Caroline Lamb, whose estranged husband would become prime minister.

Her father's handwriting was notoriously bad, even before he had a riding accident which exacerbated the problem. Emily was his eldest unmarried daughter, and served as his secretary.

Ponsonby wrote a number of novels telling tales set in the upper classes. These romances were published anonymously. She died on 3 February 1877 at her home in London.

== Works ==
- The Discipline of Life (1848)
- Pride and Irresolution - a sequel
- Mary Gray, and other Tales and Verses (1852)
- Edward Willoughby (1854)
- The Young Lord (1856)
- Sunday Readings, Consisting of Eight Short Sermons Addressed to the Young (1857)
- A Mother's Trial (1859),
- Katherine and her Sisters (1861)
- Sir Owen Fairfax (1866)
- A Story of Two Cousins (1868)
- Olivia Beaumont and Lord Latimer
