= Charles Butler-Clarke-Southwell-Wandesforde =

Irish landowner, army officer and politician (1780–1860)

The Honourable Charles Harward Butler-Clarke-Southwell-Wandesforde (9 November 1780 – 7 November 1860), born The Hon. Charles Harward Butler, was an Irish landowner, British Army officer and politician. He represented Kilkenny City in the House of Commons from 1802 to 1809 and again from 1814 to 1820, and County Kilkenny from 1820 to 1830. A major in the 14th Light Dragoons, he served in the Peninsular War.

Through his mother he became heir to the Wandesforde estates, centred on Castlecomer House in County Kilkenny and Kirklington Hall in Yorkshire. He took the additional surname Clarke in 1820 and, after succeeding to the Wandesforde estates in 1830, the further surnames Southwell and Wandesforde.

== Early life and military career ==
Butler was a younger son of John Butler, 17th Earl of Ormonde, and his wife Lady Anne Wandesforde, the only child and heiress of John Wandesford, 1st Earl Wandesford. His elder brothers included Walter Butler, 1st Marquess and 18th Earl of Ormonde, The Hon. John Wandesforde Butler, and James Butler, 1st Marquess and 19th Earl of Ormonde. He was educated at Eton College, where he was a pupil from 1789, and was admitted as a fellow-commoner of Trinity College, Cambridge, on 21 October 1797.

Butler entered the 14th Light Dragoons, becoming a major on 9 July 1807. He served with the regiment in the Iberian Peninsula from December 1808 until December 1810 and again from June until October 1811, before retiring from the regiment in January 1812.

== Parliamentary career ==
Butler was first returned to Parliament for Kilkenny City in 1802. He resigned the seat in February 1809, and returned to Parliament for the same constituency in 1814, sitting until the general election of 1820. Following the death of his eldest brother Walter in August 1820, his brother James succeeded to the Earldom of Ormonde and vacated his seat for County Kilkenny. Butler was returned for the county at the ensuing by-election in September 1820, and represented it until 1830.

Although Butler was associated electorally with the Whigs during parts of his career, his political alignment was not rigid. The Dictionary of Irish Biography records that he and his brother James did not attach themselves to any particular administration, and in a parliamentary debate in 1828 Butler described himself as "not pledged to any party".

Butler supported the removal of the remaining civil disabilities imposed upon Roman Catholics. During debate on the Catholic relief question in 1825 he argued that a settlement was necessary for political and economic stability in Ireland. In May 1828 he again spoke in support of the Catholic claims, referring to the large Roman Catholic population of his constituency. During the passage of the government's Catholic relief measures in 1829, he also supported the accompanying bill which increased the property qualification for Irish county electors, arguing that the settlement of the Catholic question altered the political significance of the existing forty-shilling franchise.

== Wandesforde inheritance and estates ==
Butler's mother, Anne, Countess of Ormonde, was the only surviving child and heiress of John Wandesford, 1st Earl Wandesford. Prior to his death Lord Wandesforde attempted to ensure that his estates would remain separate from the Ormonde estates owned by his son-in-law's family; in his will, Lord Wandesforde stipulated that his estates would pass to his daughter Anne, and thereafter to her second son, with the caveat that if the life-tenant of the Wandesforde estates came into the possession of the Ormonde estates, the Wandesforde estates would then pass to the next surviving son. The arrangement was confirmed by a family settlement executed in 1793.

Charles Butler's elder brother The Hon. John Wandesforde Butler initially stood to inherit the Wandesforde property until he died unmarried in 1796. The next-eldest brother, The Hon. James Butler consequently became heir to their mother's estates. Following the death of their eldest brother Walter Butler, 1st Marquess and 18th Earl of Ormonde in 1820, James succeeded Walter as 19th Earl of Ormonde, while Charles, as the next surviving son, became heir to the Wandesforde estates.

Walter Butler, 1st Marquess and 18th Earl of Ormonde also left Charles property which Ormonde had acquired through his marriage to Anne Maria Catherine Clarke, heiress of the Clarke family of the Sutton Hale Estate in Derbyshire. As a result of this additional inheritance, Charles Butler obtained permission under the royal sign-manual to assume the additional surname Clarke in 1820. This property formed a separate inheritance from the Wandesforde estates to which Charles was heir through his mother.

Following the death of Charles Butler-Clarke's mother, Anne Butler, Dowager Countess of Ormonde, in 1830, Charles succeeded to the Wandesforde estates. Their principal Irish property was the Castlecomer estate in north-eastern County Kilkenny, which then comprised approximately 22,000 acres and extensive interests in coal mines. The family's English holdings included estates at Kirklington, Hipswell, Hudswell and Eaton in Yorkshire and property at Ulcombe in Kent.

The inheritance also included land in counties Limerick and Clare. These estates had entered the Wandesforde family through the 1750 marriage of Butler's maternal grandfather Lord Wandesforde to Agnes Elizabeth Southwell, daughter of John Southwell of Enniscouch, County Limerick. The Southwell property included lands in the barony of Lower Connello in County Limerick and Clonderalaw in County Clare. By royal licence in June 1830 Butler assumed the additional surnames Southwell and Wandesforde, becoming The Hon. Charles Butler-Clarke-Southwell-Wandesforde.

Charles' extensive inheritance yielded a substantial annual income; an account of the estates in 1859 gave annual receipts of approximately £20,100 gross and about £9,800 net. Despite this substantial income, from the net amount Charles had to pay substantial annuities to various members of his family.

=== Legal dispute over the Wandesforde estate ===
Charles' succession to the Wandesforde estates was contested by his elder brother James Butler, 1st Marquess and 19th Earl of Ormonde. The dispute concerned the interpretation of the wills and settlements governing the Wandesforde estates.

In August 1834 Lord Ormonde instituted proceedings against Charles concerning the descent of the estates following the death of their maternal grandfather, the Earl of Wandesforde. James died in 1838 while the litigation remained unresolved, and his claim was continued by his son John Butler, 2nd Marquess of Ormonde, Charles's nephew. A judgment on demurrers in the case was given by the Master of the Rolls in Ireland in 1839, after which the 2nd Marquess of Ormonde petitioned to appeal the judgement. Legal accounts record that the proceedings subsequently extended to the presentation of a petition of appeal to the House of Lords.

At the same time, negotiations amongst the extended Butler family were undertaken to end the dispute privately. Correspondence from 1839 records a proposal for an amicable settlement intended to bring an end to further litigation between Charles and Lord Ormonde. A settlement was eventually reached in 1841, under which Charles's nephew relinquished the Ormonde branch of the Butler family's claims to the Wandesforde estates, while Charles agreed to pay his nephew a lump sum of £85,000. A deed of covenant between the Marquess and Charles concerning the production of the family deeds was executed on 10 April 1841.

== Estate management and assisted emigration ==
Wandesforde took an active role in the management of the Castlecomer estate. The National Library of Ireland's catalogue of the Prior-Wandesforde papers records that during the 1830s he sought to reduce the influence of intermediary tenants by terminating leases, reducing rents and providing assistance to tenants.

His management of the estate also included a substantial programme of landlord-assisted emigration. Historian Máire Downey describes him as proprietor of approximately 22,000 acres around Castlecomer, which at the time rendered him as the owner of the third-largest estate in County Kilkenny, the income from which was further augmented by the estate's coal mines. In April 1831, shortly after succeeding to the estate, he paid £460 13s. 4d. towards the relocation of 175 tenants to Canada.

Downey estimates that during the period between 1840 and 1853 Wandesforde spent £16,855 assisting 5,678 people to leave the estate, an average expenditure of almost £3 per person. Those assisted represented approximately 41 per cent of the estate's recorded population in 1841. The programme reached its peak during the Great Famine in 1847, when 2,059 people were assisted to leave Castlecomer; 1,983 of them were sent to Quebec.

The scheme was administered through Wandesforde's estate agents and was intended in part to permit the consolidation and redistribution of holdings vacated by emigrants. Wandesforde maintained that tenants left voluntarily and that emigration relieved overcrowding and unemployment in the mining districts, benefiting those who remained. Downey argues, however, that the composition of the emigrating groups indicates that the scheme also operated to remove some of the estate's poorest households, including families who might otherwise have become dependent upon poor relief.

== Marriage and issue ==
Butler married firstly, on 12 October 1812, his distant cousin Lady Sarah Butler, youngest daughter of Henry Thomas Butler, 2nd Earl of Carrick. They had three sons and two daughters:

- John Butler-Clarke-Southwell-Wandesforde (1813–1856), who married Emily Selina Frances McClintock in 1841. He died without issue.
- Sarah Butler-Clarke-Southwell-Wandesforde (1814–1892), who married the Rev. John Prior on 13 September 1836. Following her marriage she became Sarah Prior; following the death of her nephew Charles Butler-Clarke-Southwell-Wandesforde in 1881 she succeeded to the Wandesforde estates and assumed the additional surname and arms of Wandesforde by royal licence in 1882, becoming Sarah Prior-Wandesforde. Sarah and John Prior had five children:
  - Charles Butler Prior (c. 1840–1875), of Crossogue House, County Tipperary, who married Dorothea "Dora" Phillips, daughter of Richard Phillips of Gaile, on 28 February 1866. He died on 7 January 1875. They had five children:
    - Mary Caroline Prior (born 1867).
    - Sarah Emily Edith Prior (born 1868), who died unmarried.
    - Richard Henry Prior-Wandesforde (15 September 1870 – 19 August 1956), who succeeded his grandmother to the Wandesforde estates following her death in 1892 and assumed the additional surname and arms of Wandesforde by royal licence on 16 May 1894. He married Florence Jackson von Schwartz Pryor, daughter of the Rev. Ferdinand Pryor, Rector of Dartmouth, Nova Scotia, on 17 March 1896. They had three sons and two daughters:
      - Christopher Butler Prior-Wandesforde (15 December 1896 – 27 June 1917), a lieutenant in the Yorkshire Regiment, who died from the effects of gas during the First World War.
      - Ferdinand Charles Richard Prior-Wandesforde (1897–1986), who married Florence Sylvia Phillips.
      - Richard Cambridge Prior-Wandesforde (1902–1997).
      - Vera Prior-Wandesforde, who married Geoffrey Jameson.
      - Florence Doreen Prior-Wandesforde, who married Edward Arthur Penderell Loftus Townsend.
    - Charles Butler Prior (1872–1935).
    - Harold Astley Somerset Prior (born 1874).
  - Sarah Prior (died 1863).
  - Alice Maria Prior, who died unmarried.
  - Henry Wallis Prior-Wandesforde, of Lechlade Manor, Gloucestershire, who married Mary Anne Collis (née Phillips), widow of Robert H. Collis.
  - Sophia Elizabeth Prior, who married Major-General Henry Frederick Winchilse Ely, of Copse Dale, County Tipperary.
- Henry Butler-Clarke-Southwell-Wandesforde (1815–1885), of Ulcombe, Kent, who died unmarried. He was deemed a "Lunatic" in 1855 and subsequently lived under private care.
- Walter Butler-Clarke-Southwell-Wandesforde (1825–1853), who married Hannah Hutton, daughter of Thomas Hutton, in 1849.
  - Charles Butler-Clarke-Southwell-Wandesforde (died 1881), who succeeded his grandfather to the Wandesforde estates in 1860 and served as High Sheriff of County Kilkenny in 1879. He died unmarried, after which the Wandesforde estates passed to his aunt Sarah Prior.
- Anne Butler, who died in 1836.

Lady Sarah died on 7 July 1838. On 10 August 1842, Butler was married to his first wife's widowed sister-in-law, Lucy Butler, Dowager Countess of Carrick, the daughter of Arthur French, 1st Baron de Freyne. This second marriage produced no children.

== Death and succession ==
Charles Butler-Clarke-Southwell-Wandesforde died at Kirklington on 7 November 1860, two days before his 81st birthday, and was buried there. A memorial to him in St Mary's Church, Thomastown, County Kilkenny, records his Army rank as major and his service under the Duke of Wellington during the Peninsular War.

The succession to Butler's property was divided; his second, but eldest surviving son Henry, who had been deemed a "Lunatic" in 1855, succeeded in 1860 to separate estates in England and Ireland. The 1883 edition of John Bateman's The Great Landowners of Great Britain and Ireland recorded Henry Butler-Clarke-Southwell-Wandesforde as the owner of 13,031 acres in England and Ireland, including 1,307 acres in Derbyshire, 850 acres in Kent, 6,737 acres in County Clare and 4,137 acres in County Limerick; these lands produced a combined annual income of £8,141. Henry died unmarried on 18 March 1885, after which his estates passed to his sister Sarah Prior-Wandesforde.

The principal Wandesforde estates at Castlecomer and in Yorkshire had meanwhile passed in 1860 to Charles grandson Charles Butler-Clarke-Southwell-Wandesforde, the only son the elder Charles' deceased third son Walter. As the younger Charles was still a minor, Somerset Arthur Butler, 5th Earl of Carrick administered the Castlecomer estate until Charles came of age in 1874.

The younger Charles served as High Sheriff of County Kilkenny in 1879, but died unmarried of fever in London on 2 June 1881, aged twenty-eight. The Castlecomer and Yorkshire estates then passed to his aunt Sarah Prior. In accordance with the provisions of her father's will, she obtained a royal licence in 1882 authorising her and her descendants to assume the surname and arms of Wandesforde in addition to Prior, becoming Sarah Prior-Wandesforde. Following Henry's death in 1885, Sarah also succeeded to the estates which had passed to him in 1860.

Sarah Prior-Wandesforde died at Castlecomer House on 21 December 1892. The family estates then passed to her grandson Richard Henry Prior, who assumed the additional surname and arms of Wandesforde by royal licence in 1894.
