= George Bryan (disambiguation) =

George Bryan (1731–1791) was a Pennsylvania businessman, statesman and politician of the Revolutionary era.

George Bryan may also refer to:

- George Bryan (actor) (fl. 1586–1613), actor in English Renaissance theatre
- George Seabrook Bryan (1809–1905), U.S. federal judge
- George Bryan (politician, died 1843), Irish Member of Parliament in the British House of Commons
- George Leopold Bryan (1828–1880), Irish Member of Parliament in the British House of Commons
- George D. Bryan (1845–1919), mayor of Charleston, South Carolina, United States
- George H. Bryan (1864–1928), British mathematician and aerospace engineer
- George Bryan (British businessman) (1921–2013), British founder and owner of Drayton Manor Theme Park
- George W. Bryan (1944–2023), American CEO of Sara Lee Foods, Senior Vice President of Sara Lee Corporation, and founder of Old Waverly Golf Club
- George Bryan (golfer) (born 1988), American professional golfer and YouTube personality
- George Bryan (curler), Scottish curler
