= John Butler, 2nd Marquess of Ormonde =

Irish politician and peer (1808-1854)

The Most Honourable The Marquess of Ormonde KP
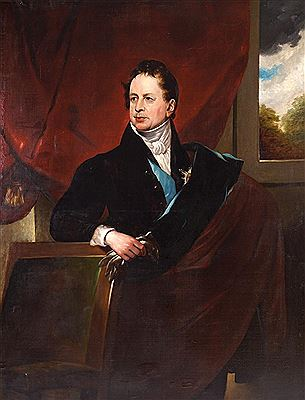
- Born: 24 August 1808
- Died: 25 September 1854 (aged 46)
- Spouse: Frances Jane Paget
- Father: James Butler, 1st Marquess of Ormonde
- Relatives: John Staples (maternal grandfather)
- Monarch: Queen Victoria

Lord-in-Waiting
- In office 1841–1852

Lord-in-Waiting
- In office 1853–1854

John Butler, 2nd Marquess of Ormonde, KP (24 August 1808 – 25 September 1854) was an Irish politician and peer. He was the son of James Butler, 1st Marquess of Ormonde and Grace Louisa Staples.

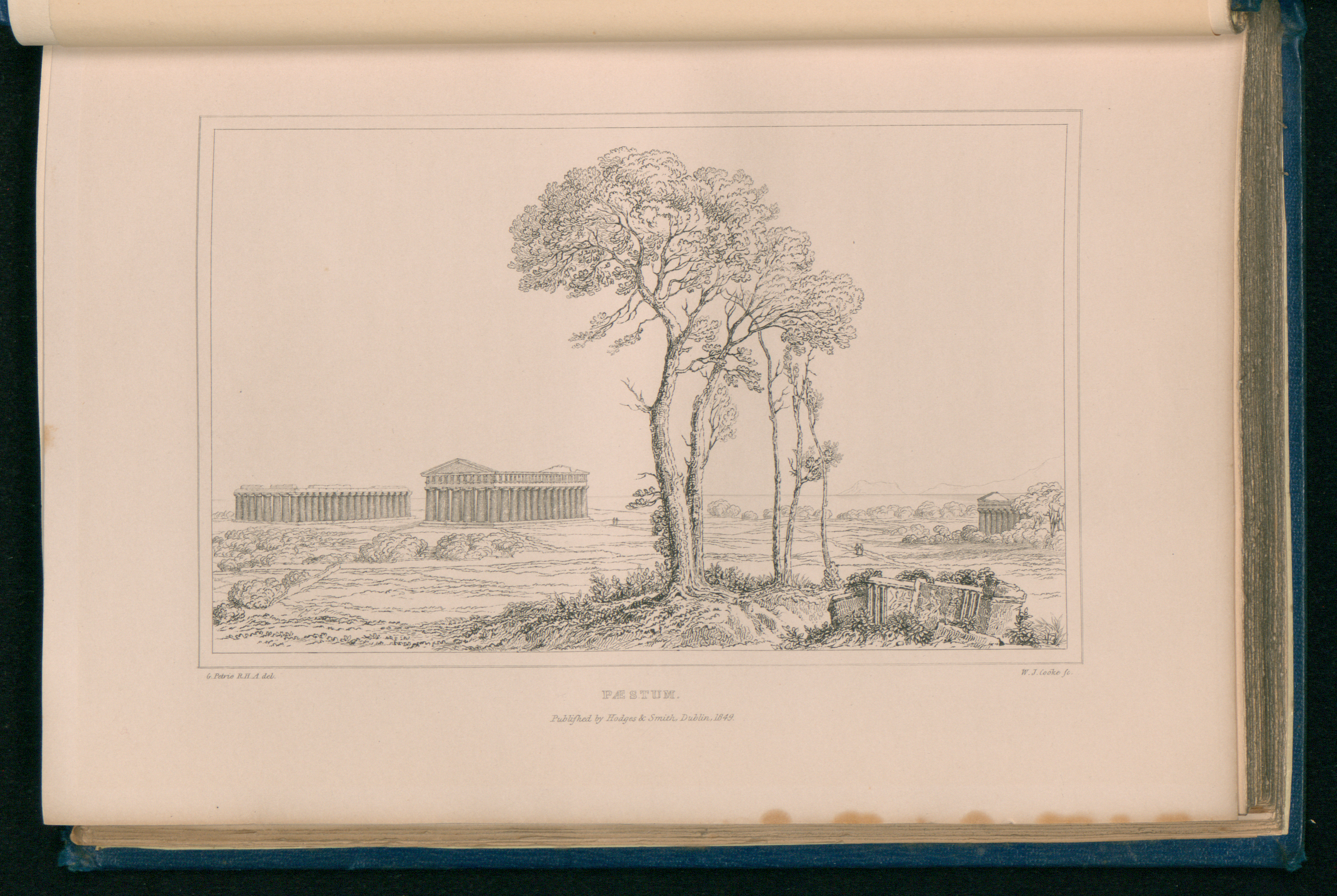
An autumn in Sicily (1850)

== Biography ==
=== Education ===
Although the bulk of the Ormonde family estates were held in Ireland, John was educated at Harrow, after which he obtained a M.A. at Oxford.

=== House of Commons ===
At the age of 22 he was elected as Member of Parliament (MP) for County Kilkenny in 1830, where he sat as a Whig; he held the seat until 1832. He did not contest the seat at the 1832 United Kingdom general election, as the election was called whilst Lord Thurles was travelling in Europe.

=== Inheritance ===
==== Viscount Thurles ====
Following the death of John's uncle Walter Butler, 1st Marquess of Ormonde in 1820, John's father James succeeded as the 19th Earl of Ormonde and 13th Earl of Ossory, and John assumed the courtesy title Viscount Thurles.

==== Earl of Ossory ====
John's father's elevation to the Marquessate of Ormonde in 1825 subsequently resulted in John assuming the courtesy title Earl of Ossory.

==== Marquess of Ormonde ====
Following the death of his father in 1838, John succeeded to the family titles and estates as the 2nd Marquess of Ormonde at the age of 29. Despite holding a Marquessate in the Peerage of Ireland, Ormonde sat in the Parliament of the United Kingdom's House of Lords as Baron Ormonde of Llanthony; as a result of the Acts of Union 1800, Ormonde's Irish peerages did not automatically entitle him to sit in the Lords; however the Barony of Ormonde had been granted within the Peerage of the United Kingdom.

During the Irish Great Famine he was viewed as a generous landlord who reduced, and in some cases cancelled rents payable to his from his tenants. He was invested as a Knight, Order of St Patrick (K.P.) in 1845.

Lord Ormonde later served in the Royal Household as a Lord-in-waiting to Queen Victoria between 1841 and 1852, and again from 1853 to 1854.

Ormonde was also the author of An Autumn in Sicily, Dublin: Hodges and Smith, 1850.

==== Dispute over the Wandesford Estates ====
Under the terms of the will of John's great-grandfather, John Wandesford, 1st Earl Wandesford, the Wandesford estates were not to pass to whoever held the Earldom of Ormonde; instead, the will provided that this inheritance should eventually pass to the second surviving son of John's paternal grandmother Anne, the daughter and sole heiress of Lord Wandesford.

The Wandesforde estates comprised the 20,000-acre Castlecomer estate and collieries in County Kilkenny, estates in Yorkshire, and property in counties Clare and Limerick. A detailed account made in 1859 valued their combined annual receipts at about £20,100 gross, yielding approximately £9,800 net before family charges.

Lord Wandesford's plan for his estates to remain separate from the Ormonde estates was confirmed in a Deed of Settlement executed by John's paternal grandmother Anne, Countess of Ormonde and Ossory, in 1793. At the time of the 1793 settlement, the heir to the Wandesford estates was John's paternal uncle the Hon. John Wandesforde Butler, an elder brother of John's father James, while the eldest brother, Walter Butler, Viscount Thurles (18th Earl of Ormonde from 1795 and 1st Marquess of Ormonde from 1816), was in line to inherit the Ormonde estates. The death of the Hon. John Wandesforde Butler in 1796 resulted in John's father James becoming the second-eldest surviving son of the family and heir to the Wandesford inheritance.

During the period from 1796 to 1820, when John's father was heir to his mother's Wandesford inheritance, James initially enjoyed an annuity of £800 from the Wandesford estates, which was increased following his marriage to John's mother, Grace Louisa Staples, in 1807. Under the terms of their marriage settlement, Grace Louisa was to receive a jointure of £2,000 annually if she outlived her husband, while £20,000 was to be set aside to provide for children of the marriage other than the eldest son. The settlement was made on the expectation that the eldest son of the marriage, John, would in due course succeed to the Wandesford estates after his father; both provisions were secured on the Wandesford estates.

The death of John's paternal uncle Walter Butler, 1st Marquess and 18th Earl of Ormonde, in 1820 resulted in John's father succeeding as 19th Earl of Ormonde and becoming life tenant of the settled Ormonde estates in Ireland. His only surviving younger brother, John's uncle the Hon. Charles Butler, consequently became heir to the Wandesford estates.

John's grandmother Anne Butler, Dowager Countess of Ormonde and Ossory, died in 1830. A disagreement between John's father James and John's uncle Charles Butler-Clarke-Southwell-Wandesforde subsequently developed into a legal dispute lasting from 1834 to 1841, as the two branches disputed their respective rights in relation to the Wandesford estates. Although John's father died in 1838, the litigation continued under John and other members of his branch of the Butler family. Under the negotiated settlement concluded in February 1841, John relinquished, for himself and his heirs, all further claims to the Wandesford estates in favour of his uncle Charles Butler-Clarke-Southwell-Wandesforde; in return, Charles Butler agreed to pay John £85,000.

==== Possible elevation to a Dukedom ====
Lord Ormonde's son, James Butler, 3rd Marquess of Ormonde is recorded as having written to the then Prime Minister of the United Kingdom, Benjamin Disraeli, regarding the restoration of the Dukedom of Ormonde in October 1868. The third Marquess claimed that his grandfather, James Butler, 1st Marquess of Ormonde (then 19th Earl of Ormond) had been advised by Lord Liverpool to apply for the restoration of the Dukedom, and that Lord Liverpool had advised him that in order to achieve this, he would first need to apply to be elevated from the rank of Earl to Marquess. An application was duly made, and James, 19th Earl of Ormond was granted the title Marquess of Ormonde. The 3rd Marquess believed that Lord Liverpool's loss of the Office of Prime Minister in 1827 frustrated this plan, and the 1st Marquess took no further action towards applying for the restoration of the Dukedom. The 3rd Marquess also alleged in his letter to Prime Minister Disraeli that his father, the second Marquess, had resolved not to pursue the restoration of the Dukedom of Ormonde unless another peer was also elevated to a Dukedom during his lifetime.

== Marriage and children ==
In 1843 Lord Ormonde married Frances Jane Paget, daughter of General Sir Edward Paget and his second wife Lady Harriet Legge. The marriage produced four sons and two daughters:

- James Butler, 3rd Marquess of Ormonde (1844–1919), married Lady Elizabeth Harriet Grosvenor, daughter of Hugh Lupus Grosvenor, 1st Duke of Westminster.
  - Lady Beatrice Frances Elizabeth Butler (1876 - 1952), married Lt-Gen. Sir Reginald Pole-Carew in 1901.
  - Lady Constance Mary Butler (1879 - 1949)
- Lady Mary Butler (1846–1929), married the Hon. William Henry Fitzwilliam.
  - Marie "Mab" Albreda Blanche Wentworth-FitzWilliam (1879 - 14 April 1963), married Major Harold Maxwell Walker in 1904.
  - Isabel Elizabeth Mary Wentworth-FitzWilliam (1880 - 1955)
  - Irene "Ena" Serga Alice Jane Mary Wentworth-FitzWilliam (1883 - 19 Mar 1972)
- Lord Hubert Butler (1847–1867).
- Arthur Butler, 4th Marquess of Ormonde (1849–1943), married in 1887 to Chicago Heiress Ellen Sprague Stager, daughter of General Anson Stager and had issue.
  - Lady Evelyn Frances Butler (1887 - 1978), married to Vice-Adm. Hon. Edmund Rupert Drummond
  - James George Anson Butler, 5th Marquess of Ormonde (1890 - 1949), married The Hon. Sybil Fellowes in 1915.
  - James Arthur Norman Butler, 6th Marquess of Ormonde (1893 - 1971), married Jesse Carlos Clarke in 1924.
  - Lady Eleanor Rachel Butler (24 April 1894 - 1969), married (1) Captain Edward Brassey Egerton in 1915 and (2) William Henry Prior in 1961.
- Lord Theobald Butler (1852–1929), married Annabella Brydon in 1885.
  - James Walter Theobold Gordon Butler (19 May 1886 - 2 May 1945), married Alice Theodora Aked in 1926
  - Violet Mary Emily Maud Butler (22 April 1889 - 30 September 1973), who married Ronald Victor Okes Hart-Synnot in 1912.
  - Sybil Frances Christina Lilah Butler (10 February 1891 - 30 September 1970), married her first cousin, Arthur Henry Francis Edwardes in 1913.
  - Victoria Blanche Constance Theodora Butler (28 September 1897 - 15 June 1952), married Charles Bellville West (maternal grandson of Perfumer James Atkinson of Atkinsons of London) in 1920.
  - James Hubert Theobald Charles Butler, 7th Marquess of Ormonde (April 1899 - 25 October 1997 with issue), married (1) Nan Gilpin in 1935 and (2) Elizabeth Rarden in 1976.
- Lady Blanche Butler (1854–1914), married Colonel the Hon. Cuthbert Ellison Edwardes, son of the 3rd Baron Kensington in 1882.
  - Hubert William John Edwardes (1883 - 1944)
  - Arthur Henry Francis Edwardes (1885 - 1951), married his cousin Lilah Butler in 1913.
  - Cuthbert Theobald Edwardes (1887 - 1967)
  - Capt. Richard Edwardes (1894 - 1967), married Ada Mary Macgeorge in 1929.
  - Lt. Owen Edwardes (1894 - 1916)

=== Death ===
In September 1854 he and his young family were bathing near Loftus Hall when he died suddenly. His nine-year-old son James Edward, Earl of Ossory succeeded him as Marquess of Ormonde. During the minority of the Third Marquess, John's widow Frances administered the family estates; under the terms of John's Will, Frances enjoyed a life annuity of £2,000. Their marriage settlement had also provided for a £10,000 sum to be placed in Trust after John's death, with the income to be paid to all children from the union other than their oldest surviving son in equal shares. Following his death, a magnificent funeral procession was held in the City of Kilkenny, where his remains were transported from Kilkenny Castle to St Canice's Cathedral. His widow Frances later commissioned Edward Richardson to erect a large monument at her husband's tomb within the Cathedral.

== Works ==
- Butler, John (1850). Autumn in Sicily. Dublin: Hodges and Smith.

== Sources ==
- Kirwan, John (2018). "Appendix 1: A Family Settlement - a Family Row: The History of the Inheritance of Lady Frances Susannah Anne Wandesforde, Countess of Ormond and Ossory". In Kirwan, John (ed.). The Chief Butlers of Ireland and the House of Ormond: An Illustrated Genealogical Guide (1st ed.). Newbridge, County Kildare: Irish Academic Press. pp. 297–318. ISBN 978-1-911024-04-0.

Parliament of the United Kingdom
Preceded by Viscount Duncannon; Charles Clarke	Member of Parliament for County Kilkenny; 1830 – 1832; With: Viscount Duncannon	Succeeded by Pierce Butler; William Francis Finn
Political offices
Preceded by The Earl of Morton	Lord-in-waiting; 1853–1854	Succeeded by ?
Peerage of Ireland
Preceded by James Wandesford Butler	Marquess of Ormonde; 1838–1854	Succeeded by James Arthur Butler
