= James Butler, 1st Marquess of Ormonde =

Irish politician

The Most Honourable The Marquess of Ormonde KP
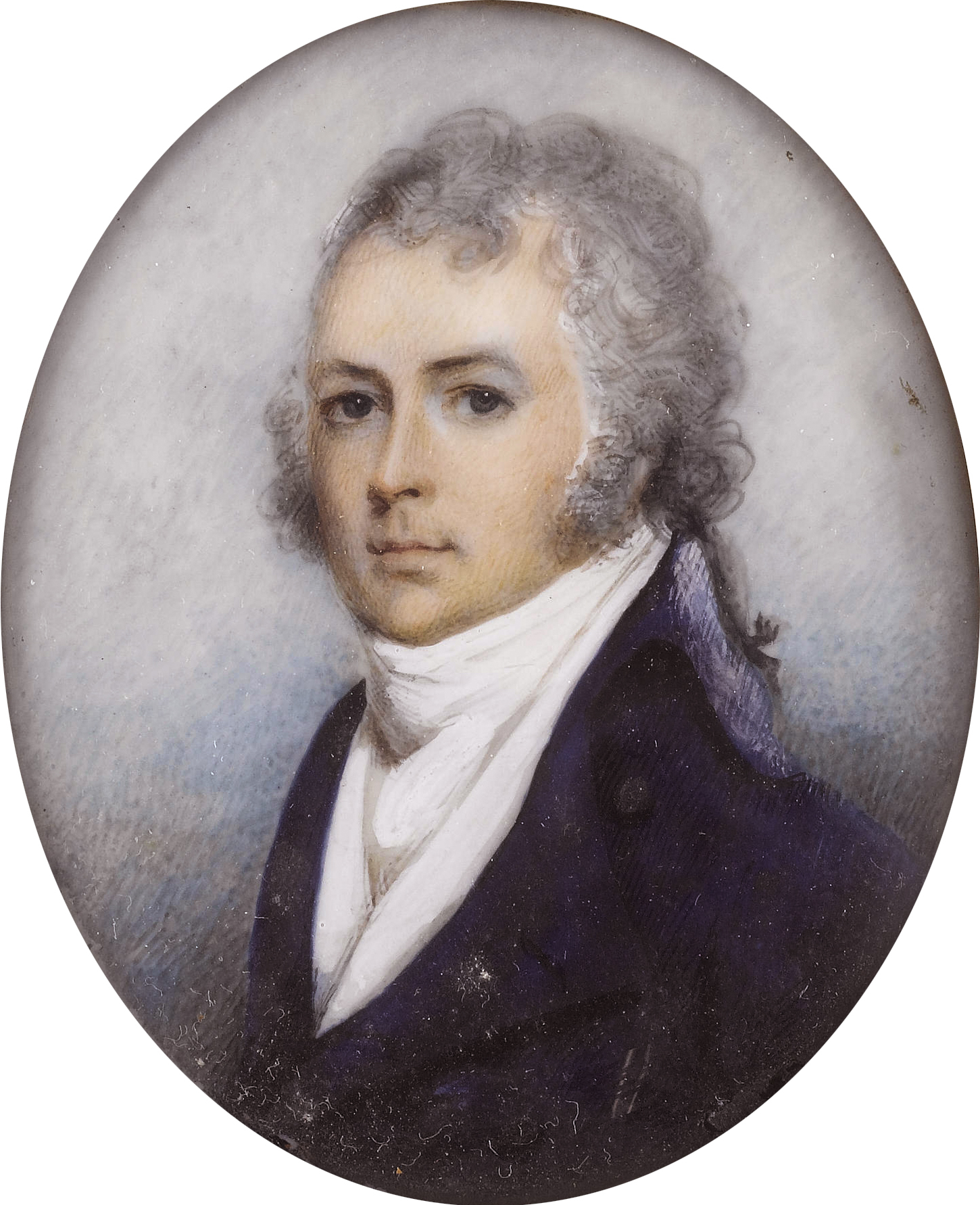
- Portrait of Ormonde
- Born: 15 July 1774; Kilkenny Castle, Ireland
- Died: 18 May 1838 (aged 63)
- Education: Eton College
- Parents: John Butler, 17th Earl of Ormonde (father); Frances Susan Elizabeth Wandesford (mother)
- Relatives: Walter Butler (brother)

Member of Parliament for County Kilkenny
- In office 1801–1820

Member of Parliament for County Kilkenny
- In office 1796–1801

Member of Parliament for Kilkenny City
- In office 1796–1796

Personal details
- Party: Pittite (from 1815); Whigs (1796–1815)

Military service
- Allegiance: United Kingdom; Kingdom of Ireland
- Branch/service: British Army
- Years of service: British Army (1790–1802); Militia (1806–1838)
- Rank: Colonel
- Unit: 14th Dragoons (1790–1802); KilKenny Militia (1806–1838)

James Wandesford Butler, 1st Marquess of Ormonde and 19th Earl of Ormonde (15 July 1774 – 18 May 1838), was an Irish nobleman, landowner, and politician. He served as the Member of Parliament for County Kilkenny from 1801 until the death of his older brother in 1820, which resulted in his succession as the 19th Earl of Ormonde. He was made a Knight in the Order of St Patrick in 1821.

== Early life ==
James Butler was born at Kilkenny Castle on 15 July 1774 as the second son of John Butler, 17th Earl of Ormonde, and his wife, the heiress Lady Frances Susan Elizabeth "Anne" Wandesford, who was the only surviving child of John Wandesford, 1st Earl Wandesford. He attended Eton College from 1783 until 1790.

== Career ==
=== Soldier ===
In 1790 Butler enlisted as a Cornet in the 14th King's Hussars Regiment. He retired from his regiment with the rank of Major in 1802. He later served as a Lieutenant-Colonel in the Kilkenny Militia from 1806 until his death, and was promoted to Colonel in 1820.

=== House of Commons ===
He served a Member of Parliament for Kilkenny City in the Irish House of Commons in 1796 (he never took his seat and resigned after 3 months) and served then for County Kilkenny until the Act of Union in 1801. He sat subsequently for the Irish county constituency of County Kilkenny and was member of the UK House of Commons from 1801, sitting as a Whig.

Butler also served as Mayor of Kilkenny from 1808 to 1809 and 1814-15.

=== Earl of Ormonde ===
The death of his older brother Walter Butler, 1st Marquess of Ormonde in 1820 resulted in his succession as 19th Earl of Ormonde. As a peer he was a Moderate Tory, and voted in support of the Reform Bill during the early 1830s. Ormonde was a well-known advocate for the Irish people with his first speech at Westminster condemning the Irish Window tax and defending the right of Irish landowners.

=== Inheritance and estates ===
==== Wandesford Inheritance ====
Under the terms of the will of James' maternal grandfather, John Wandesford, 1st Earl Wandesford, the Wandesford estates were not to pass to whoever held Earldom of Ormonde; instead, the will provided that this inheritance should eventually pass to the second surviving son of John's mother Anne (the daughter and sole heiress of Lord Wandesford).

The Wandesforde estates comprised the 20,000-acre Castlecomer estate and collieries in County Kilkenny, estates in Yorkshire, and property in counties Clare and Limerick. A detailed account made in 1859 valued their combined annual receipts at about £20,100 gross, yielding approximately £9,800 net before family charges.

Lord Wandesford's plan for his estates to remain separate from the Ormonde estates was confirmed in a Deed of Settlement executed by James' mother Anne, Countess of Ormonde and Ossory in 1793. At the time of the 1793 settlement, the heir to the Wandesford estates was James' elder brother the Hon. John Wandesforde Butler, whilst James and John's eldest brother Walter Butler, Viscount Thurles (18th Earl of Ormonde from 1795 and 1st Marquess of Ormonde from 1816) was in line to inherit the Ormonde estates. John Butler's death in 1796 resulted in James becoming the second-eldest surviving son of the family and the heir to the Wandesford inheritance.

During the period between 1796 and 1820 when James was the heir to his mother's inheritance, James initially enjoyed an annuity of £800 from the Wandesford estates, which was increased following his marriage to Grace Louisa Staples in 1807. Under the terms of their marriage settlement, Grace Louisa was to receive a Jointure of £2,000 annually if she outlived her husband, and £20,000 was to be set aside to provide for children of the union other than the firstborn son (who would eventually inherit the Wandesford estates after James' death); both sums were was secured on the Wandesford estates.

The death of James' eldest brother Walter Butler, 1st Marquess and 18th Earl of Ormonde in 1820 resulted in James becoming the 19th Earl of Ormonde and the life tenants of the settled Ormonde estates in Ireland, whilst his only surviving younger brother the Hon. Charles Butler became the heir to the Wandesford estates.

James and Charles' mother Anne Butler, Dowager Countess of Ormonde and Ossory died in 1830, and a disagreement between the brothers resulted in a legal dispute lasting from 1834 to 1841, as both brothers asserted their right to inherit the Wandesford estates. Although James had died in 1838, the result of the negotiated legal settlement was that James' eldest son John Butler, 2nd Marquess of Ormonde relinquished all claims over the Wandesford estates on behalf of himself, his siblings and his descendants, in favour of his uncle Charles Butler-Clarke-Southwell-Wandesforde; in return, Charles agreed pay his nephew the sum of £85,000.

==== Ormonde Estates ====
Following his brother's death, James inherited some £450,000 in debts. As a result, the Ormonde Estates in Derbyshire were sold at auction on Thursday 27 November 1824. The Sutton Hall Estate, including the Manor House, some 5,500 acres of land, and several coal mines generated some £5,800 in rents alone; this estate was sold for £216,000 to the Manchester Spinner John Arkwright Esq.

The Chilcote Estate, comprising 1,320 acres generating £2,200 annually, was sold to a Mr Robinson of Kingston, Surrey, for £87,000. The adjacent Cottage Park Farm, comprising 281 acres, was sold to a solicitor, Mr Cookney of Holborn (acting on behalf the brewer H. Worthington Esq). The combined proceeds of the sales were approximately £450,000.

Despite the disposal of the family's extensive estates in England, upon his elder brother's death James become one of the largest landowners in Ireland, and enjoyed an annual income of over £20,000 from his Irish estates.

Having joined the fashionable society in London, he became a companion of the Prince Regent. Subsequently, at the Prince's coronation as George IV, he was created a Peer of the United Kingdom, as Baron Ormonde, of Llanthony, in the county of Monmouth.

=== Marquess of Ormonde ===
In 1825 the Marquessate of Ormonde was recreated for James; the previous creation of the title had become extinct upon the death of his elder brother. As the Marquessate was created in the Peerage of Ireland, he continued to sit in the United Kingdom House of Lords as Baron Ormonde.

He served as Lord Lieutenant of County Kilkenny from 1831 until 1838, and was a Militia Aide-de-camp to King William IV from 1830 to 1837, and Queen Victoria from 1837 until his death.

==== Attempts to restore Dukedom ====
Lord Ormonde's grandson, James Butler, 3rd Marquess of Ormonde, is recorded as having written in October 1868 to the-then Prime Minister of the United Kingdom, Benjamin Disraeli, regarding the restoration of the Dukedom of Ormonde, which had been granted to the 19th Earl's great-great-great-uncle, James Butler, 1st Duke of Ormond in 1661. In the letter, the Third Marquess claimed that in 1825 his grandfather James Butler, 19th Earl of Ormonde had been advised by Prime Minister Lord Liverpool to apply for the restoration of the Dukedom of Ormonde, with the caveat that he would first need to apply to be elevated from the rank of Earl to Marquess. An application was duly made, and James, 19th Earl of Ormond was granted the title Marquess of Ormonde in 1825. The 3rd Marquess believed that Lord Liverpool's loss of the Office of Prime Minister in 1827 frustrated this plan, and the 1st Marquess took no further action towards applying for the restoration of the Dukedom.

== Marriage and children ==
He married Grace Louisa Staples, daughter of Rt. Hon. John Staples and Hon. Henrietta Molesworth (daughter of Richard Molesworth, 3rd Viscount Molesworth) on 12 October 1807. They had five sons and five daughters:

- John Butler, 2nd Marquess of Ormonde (1808–1854), who married Frances Jane (died 26 August 1903), daughter of Gen. Hon. Sir Edward Paget
- Lord Walter Wandesford Butler (1814–1861), Army officer who was a Captain in the Kilkenny Militia.
- Lord James Wandesford Butler (1815–1893), who married Lady Rachel Evelyn Russell, daughter of the 6th Duke of Bedford
  - James Francis Butler (1857 - 1933)
  - Grace Louisa Butler
  - Georgia Maud Sita Butler (1862 - 1863)
  - Julian George Butler (1864 - 1939)
- Lady Louisa Grace Butler (1816–1896), married Thomas Fortescue, 1st Baron Clermont
- Lord Richard Molesworth Butler (1818–1838)
- Lord Charles Wandesford Butler (1820–1857)
- Lady Harriet Eleanor Butler (died 28 September 1885), married Robert Fowler, 1st son of Rt Rev Robert Fowler, Bishop of Ossory, Ferns and Leighlin
- Lady Anne Butler (died 1849), married John Wynne, of Hazlewood House, Sligo
- Lady Elizabeth Butler (died 1892)
- Lady Mary Charlotte Butler (died 1840)

In 1827, the London residence of Lord and Lady Ormonde was recorded as being 14 Weymouth Street, Westminster. Several of their children suffered from Epilepsy, which was attributed to the sudden deaths of their second son Lord Walter Butler, who died suddenly at his home, No. 16 South Frederick Street, Dublin, in 1861, and their fourth son Lord Charles Butler, who died at his mother's residence, Marlay House, Dublin, after a series of seizures in 1857.

== Later life and death ==
Lord Ormonde died at O'Dienne's Hotel in Dublin on 22 May 1838 after a fortnight-long illness. The Marchioness of Ormonde, their eldest son Lord Ossory and Lord Walter Butler were at his bedside when he died. Lord Ossory succeeded to the Marquessate of Ormonde and the family's extensive estate in Ireland.

He was survived by his wife Louisa by twenty-two years. During her widowhood she rebuilt Garryricken House, the demense of which formed part of the Ormonde Estates in County Kilkenny. In August 1857 she vacated the house and took a new residence Marlay House near Dublin which remained as her primary residence until her death in 1860.

== See also ==
- Butler dynasty

== Sources ==
- Kirwan, John (2018). The Chief Butlers of Ireland and the House of Ormond: An Illustrated Genealogical Guide (1st ed.). Newbridge, County Kildare: Irish Academic Press. ISBN 978-1-911024-04-0.
- Parliamentary Election Results in Ireland, 1801-1922, edited by B. M. Walker (Royal Irish Academy 1978)
- Leigh Rayment's Peerage Pages
- Leigh Rayment's Historical List of MPs – Constituencies beginning with "K" (part 2)

Parliament of Ireland
Preceded by Hon. John Wandesford Butler; James Wemys	Member of Parliament for Kilkenny City; 1796; With: James Wemys	Succeeded by James Wemys; Bryan Kavanagh
Preceded by William Ponsonby; Hon. John Wandesford Butler	Member of Parliament for County Kilkenny; 1796–1801; With: William Ponsonby	Parliament of Ireland abolished
Parliament of the United Kingdom
New constituency	Member of Parliament for County Kilkenny; 1801–1820; With: William Ponsonby 1801–1806; Hon. George Ponsonby 1806; Hon. Frederick Ponsonby 1806–1820	Succeeded by Hon. Frederick Ponsonby; Charles Clarke
Honorary titles
New title	Lord Lieutenant of Kilkenny; 1831–1838	Succeeded by Viscount Duncannon
Peerage of the United Kingdom
New creation	Baron Ormonde; 1821–1838	Succeeded by John Butler
Peerage of Ireland
New creation	Marquess of Ormonde; 1825–1838	Succeeded by John Butler
Preceded by Walter Butler	Earl of Ormonde; Earl of Ossory; 1820–1838	Succeeded by John Butler
