= George Shee =

George Shee may refer to:

- Sir George Shee, 2nd Baronet (1785–1870), Irish diplomat
- Sir George Shee, 1st Baronet (1758–1825), British government minister
- George Darell Shee (1843–1894), English judge

== See also ==
- George Archer-Shee (1895–1914), Royal Navy cadet
