= William Francis Finn =

Irish politician

William Francis Finn (1784 - 8 December 1862) was an Irish politician in the United Kingdom House of Commons.

He was elected to the United Kingdom House of Commons as Member of Parliament for County Kilkenny in 1832, and held the seat until 1837. His uncle was the owner and printer of Finn's Leinster Journal, Edmund Finn. Finn married Alicia O'Connell, the fifth sister of Daniel O'Connell. They lived at Tullaroan, County Kilkenny. He and his wife both died on the same day, 8 December 1862.

Parliament of the United Kingdom
Preceded by John Butler, Earl of Ossory; John Ponsonby, Viscount Duncannon	Member of Parliament for County Kilkenny; 1832 – 1837; With: Pierce Butler	Succeeded by Pierce Butler; George Bryan
