= John Greene (Kilkenny MP) =

Irish landowner and politician (died 1883)

John Greene (died 16 June 1883) was an Irish landowner and politician from County Kilkenny.

At the 1847 general election, Greene was elected to the United Kingdom House of Commons in Westminster as one of the two Members of Parliament (MPs) for the County Kilkenny constituency. He was re-elected at the next three general elections, and held the seat until his defeat at the 1865 general election by George Leopold Bryan. He was first elected as Repeal Association candidate, and thereafter as a Liberal Independent (1852), a member of the Independent Irish Party in 1857, and as a Liberal in 1859 and at his defeat in 1865.

Parliament of the United Kingdom
Preceded by Pierce Somerset Butler; Richard Smithwicke	Member of Parliament for County Kilkenny; 1847 – 1865; With: Pierce Somerset Butler 1847–1852; William Shee 1852–1857; Leopold Agar-Ellis 1857–1865	Succeeded by Leopold Agar-Ellis; George Leopold Bryan
