= Edward Marum =

Irish politician

- Born: Edward Purcell Mulhallen Marum
- Education: St. Patrick's College, Carlow
- Occupation: Politician
- Spouse: Elizabeth

Edward Purcell Mulhallen Marum (5 October 1822 – 21 September 1890), was an Irish politician in the United Kingdom House of Commons.

The son of Richard Marum and his wife Elizabeth. Edward studied at St. Patrick's College, Carlow, earning a BA and LLB from the University of London, he subsequently studied at the King's Inns and was called to the bar in 1848.

He stood unsuccessfully as a Home Rule candidate for the United Kingdom House of Commons at a by-election in Kilkenny city in 1875. He was subsequently elected as Member of Parliament for County Kilkenny as a Parnellite Home Ruler in 1880, topping the poll, and held the seat until the constituency was divided for the 1885 general election. He was then elected for the new North Kilkenny constituency, and held that seat until his death.

He was a very eloquent speaker. He supported Horace Plunkett's efforts to establish agricultural co-operatives by addressing local meetings, but died of heart disease before he had been able to attend more than three or four.

== Notes ==
Parliament of the United Kingdom
Preceded by George Leopold Bryan; Patrick Martin	Member of Parliament for County Kilkenny; 1880 – 1885; With: Patrick Martin 1880–1885	Constituency divided
New constituency	Member of Parliament for North Kilkenny; 1885 – 1890	Succeeded by Sir John Pope Hennessy
