= Pierce Somerset Butler =

Irish politician

Pierce Somerset Butler (26 January 1801 – 28 July 1865) was an Irish politician in the United Kingdom House of Commons.

He was the son of Hon. Pierce Butler and Anne March. He married Jessy Anne Bryan on 3 February 1835 in London at St George's, Hanover Square. They had two daughters.

He attended Trinity College Dublin. Later he was elected to the United Kingdom House of Commons as Member of Parliament for County Kilkenny in 1843, and held the seat until 1852. For the first three years he served in this position with his father. Like his father he was not in favour of the Act of Union and discussed the repeal of this Act.

Butler was also Chairman of the Waterford and Kilkenny Railway Company. In 1854 he was involved in the Case of Pierce Somerset Butler v Viscount Mountgarret. "Verdict for plaintiff who thus came into a peerage, defendant being proved illegitimate"

Parliament of the United Kingdom
Preceded by George Bryan; Pierce Butler	Member of Parliament for County Kilkenny; 1843 – 1852; With: Pierce Butler 1843–1846; Richard Smithwicke 1846–1847; John Greene 1847–1852	Succeeded by John Greene; William Shee
