= Richard Smithwicke =

Member of Parliament for County Kilkenny
- In office 29 July 1846 – 18 August 1847 Serving with Pierce Somerset Butler
- Preceded by: Pierce Butler; Pierce Somerset Butler
- Succeeded by: Pierce Somerset Butler; John Greene

Personal details
- Born: 1804
- Died: 20 November 1860 (aged 55–56)
- Party: Repeal Association

Richard Smithwicke (1804 – 20 November 1860) was an Irish Repeal Association politician.

Smithwicke was first elected MP for County Kilkenny at a by-election in 1846—caused by the death of Pierce Butler—and held the seat until 1847 when he did not seek re-election.

Parliament of the United Kingdom
Preceded by Pierce Butler; Pierce Somerset Butler	Member of Parliament for County Kilkenny; 1846–1847; With: Pierce Somerset Butler	Succeeded by Pierce Somerset Butler; John Greene
