= Patrick Martin (Irish politician) =

Irish politician

Patrick Leopold Martin (1830 – 29 October 1895), was an Irish politician in the United Kingdom House of Commons.

He was elected to the United Kingdom House of Commons as Member of Parliament for County Kilkenny in 1874, and held the seat until the constituency was divided for the 1885 general election.

Parliament of the United Kingdom
| Preceded by George Leopold Bryan; Leopold Agar-Ellis | Member of Parliament for County Kilkenny; 1874 – 1885; With: George Leopold Bryan 1874–1880; Edward Marum 1880–1885 | Constituency divided |
