= William Shee =

Anglo-Irish politician, lawyer, and judge (1804–1868)

William Shee

Sir William Shee (24 June 1804 – 1868) was an Anglo-Irish politician, lawyer and judge, the first Roman Catholic judge to sit in England and Wales since the Reformation.

== Early life and legal career ==
Shee was born in Finchley, Middlesex. His father, Joseph, was a merchant from Thomastown, County Kilkenny, Ireland, his mother, Teresa née Darell. Nicholas Wiseman was a cousin. He was initially educated at the school for French refugees founded by the Abbé Carron in Somers Town and where Hughes Felicité Robert de Lamennais taught. In 1818 he joined Wiseman as a student at St. Cuthbert's College, Ushaw. He also attended Edinburgh University where he joined The Speculative Society. In 1823 he became a pupil of Thomas Chitty at Lincoln's Inn and was called to the bar in 1828.

Shee enjoyed a successful career as a barrister, being made serjeant-at-law in 1840, receiving a patent of precedence in 1845, and being appointed queen's serjeant in 1857. In 1837, he married Mary Gordon (died 1861) and their children included George Darell Shee and Henry Gordon Shee QC who became Recorder of Burnley and a judge in Salford.

Shee's famous cases as an advocate included the Roupell case and leading the unsuccessful defence of poisoner William Palmer in 1856. In the latter case the defence case suffered adverse comment from the judge because Shee had, against all rules and conventions of professional conduct, told the jury that he personally believed Palmer to be innocent. He edited a great number of legal publications.

== Politics ==
See also Roman Catholicism in Great Britain:The Catholic Revival in the Nineteenth Century.

Shee was a champion of Catholic Emancipation and addressed a protestant rally held on Penenden Heath, Maidstone as early as 24 November 1828. He failed in his first attempt to enter parliament at the 1847 general election for Marylebone but succeeded for Kilkenny County in the 1852 general election.

He gave his maiden speech on 12 November 1852 during the debate on the Queen's Speech. Shee became active in Irish tenants' rights. William Sharman Crawford having failed to be re-elected in 1852, Shee took charge of, and reintroduced, his Tenant Right Bill on 25 November 1852. In December, he spoke in support of Sir Joseph Napier's Improvement Compensation Bill but both bills were rejected by a select committee. Shee submitted an amended bill in February 1854 but it fared poorly.

In June 1854 he failed in a controversial motion for leave to introduce a bill to amend the laws on the political administration of the Church of Ireland, and to increase funds for Irish religious education and church building. In 1855, discouraged in his exertions as to reform, Shee consulted with Sharman Crawford and drafted a new Tenants' Improvement Compensation Bill, addressing some of the objections of the select committee. It fared no better than his earlier efforts. Shee's failure cost him the support of his voters and he lost his seat in the 1857 general election.

Shee was defeated in Kilkenny again in 1859 general election and declined judicial office in Madras in 1860. He stood unsuccessfully in Stoke-on-Trent at a by-election in September 1862.

== Judge ==
William Shee
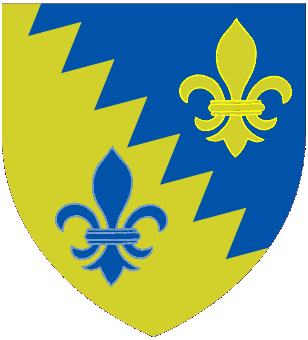
- Crest: A swan rising Sable.
- Shield: Per bend indented Azure and Or two fleurs-de-lis counterchanged.

On 19 December 1863, Shee was appointed judge of the Queen's Bench, and knighted the following year. He was the first Roman Catholic judge in England since the Glorious Revolution of 1688. Shee died from apoplexy at his home in London.

== Bibliography ==
- Barker, G. F. R. (2004) "Shee, Sir William (1804–1868)", rev. Hugh Mooney, Oxford Dictionary of National Biography, Oxford University Press, accessed 24 July 2007 (subscription or UK public library membership required)
- Knott, G. H. (1912). The Trial of William Palmer (Notable English Trials ed.). Edinburgh: William Hodge & Co. The first edition of this text is available at Wikisource: "Shee, William" . Dictionary of National Biography. London: Smith, Elder & Co. 1885–1900.

Parliament of the United Kingdom
Preceded by Pierce Somerset Butler; John Greene	Member of Parliament for County Kilkenny; 1852 – 1857; With: John Greene	Succeeded by Leopold Agar-Ellis; John Greene
