= Edmund Finn (printer) =

Irish printer, publisher and bookseller

- Born: Ireland
- Died: 5 April 1777; Kilkenny, Ireland
- Known for: owner of Finn's Leinster Journal

Edmund Finn (died 5 April 1777) was an Irish printer, publisher, bookseller and owner of Finn's Leinster Journal.

== Life ==
The date and place of birth of Edmund Finn are unknown, the first records show him working in Cork in 1766. He then appears in Kilkenny in 1767 working at St Mary's Churchyard and later in High Street from 1767 to 1777. From here he founded Finn's Leinster Journal which he also edited, printed and published twice weekly. He also had a retail and wholesale business dealing in almanacs, books, lottery tickets, magazines, musical instruments, and stationery.

Finn married Catherine, the daughter of another Kilkenny printer, Michael Butler. Finn died on 5 April 1777, after which his wife continued to produce the newspaper until about 1805. They had 7 children including their eldest, Michael. Michael married Sarah Williams in 1796, the daughter of a Dublin bookseller James Williams (died 1786). He made an unsuccessful attempt to run his mother's printing business, changing the tone of the Journal and unsuccessfully applied for a government subvention. Michael also partnered with his brother-in-law, William Williams, in October 1800 in a disastrous banking venture in Kilkenny.

Edmund Finn's business was most likely financially supported by his brother William (died 15 February 1813). William was a successful merchant based in Castle Street, Carlow, as well as owning farms in County Kilkenny. He was also a County Carlow delegate at the 1792 Catholic Convention in Dublin. He was married to Lucinda (née Byrne), with whom he had at least 3 sons. One son, Thomas, became a journalist with Walter Cox's Irish Magazine . Another son, William Francis Finn became MP for County Kilkenny.
