= Custos Rotulorum of County Kilkenny =

The Custos Rotulorum of County Kilkenny was the highest civil officer in County Kilkenny.

== Incumbents ==
- 1758–59 William Ponsonby, 2nd Earl of Bessborough
- ?–1820 Walter Butler, 1st Marquess of Ormonde

For later custodes rotulorum, see Lord Lieutenant of Kilkenny
