= Leopold Agar-Ellis, 5th Viscount Clifden =

British aristocrat and politician (1829–1899)

The Right Honourable The Viscount Clifden

Member of Parliament for County Kilkenny
- In office 1857–1874 Serving with John Greene, George Leopold Bryan
- Preceded by: John Greene; William Shee
- Succeeded by: George Leopold Bryan; Patrick Martin

Personal details
- Born: Leopold George Frederick Agar-Ellis; 13 May 1829 London, England
- Died: 10 September 1899 (aged 70)
- Spouse: Hon. Harriet Stonor (m. 1864)
- Relations: Henry Ellis, 2nd Viscount Clifden (grandfather); George Howard, 6th Earl of Carlisle (grandfather)
- Parent(s): George Agar-Ellis, 1st Baron Dover; Lady Georgiana Howard
- Education: Trinity College, Cambridge

Leopold George Frederick Agar-Ellis, 5th Viscount Clifden (13 May 1829 – 10 September 1899), known as Leopold Agar-Ellis until 1895, was a British Liberal politician.

== Early life ==
Born in London, Clifden was the second son of George Agar-Ellis, 1st Baron Dover, and the eldest son of Henry Ellis, 2nd Viscount Clifden. His mother was Lady Georgiana, daughter of George Howard, 6th Earl of Carlisle. He was educated at Trinity College, Cambridge, and was called to the Bar, Inner Temple, in 1854.

== Career ==
Between 1855 and 1858 and 1859 and 1864 Clifden served as Aide-de-Camp to the Lord-Lieutenant of Ireland, his uncle the Earl of Carlisle. He also served as Member of Parliament for County Kilkenny from 1857 to 1874. In 1895 he succeeded his nephew as fifth Viscount Clifden and fourth Baron Dover and entered the House of Lords.

== Personal life ==
On 8 February 1864, Agar-Ellis was married to the Hon. Harriet, daughter of Thomas Stonor, 3rd Baron Camoys and Frances Towneley (only daughter of Peregrine Edward Towneley). Together, they were the parents of:

- George Robert Agar-Ellis (1864–1872), who died young.
- Caroline Agar-Ellis (1865–1891), who married Lt.-Col. J. Malcolm Fawcett, of Peckleton House, Hinckley, in 1888.
- Hon. Harriet Georgiana Lucia Agar-Ellis (1867–1928), who married Capt. Thomas Granville Knox, only son of Col. Hon. William Knox MP (second son of Thomas Knox, 2nd Earl of Ranfurly) and Georgiana Rooper (youngest daughter of John Bonfoy Rooper of Abbots Ripton), in 1897.
- Hon. Evelyn Mary Agar-Ellis (1869–1952), mar. 27 Jun 1896 Hon. Edward Henry Vanden-Bempde-Johnstone (second son of Harcourt Vanden-Bempde-Johnstone, 1st Baron Derwent) and Charlotte Mills (sister of Charles Mills, 1st Baron Hillingdon and daughter of Sir Charles Mills, 1st Baronet).

He died in London in September 1899, aged 70. He had no surviving male issue and the barony of Dover became extinct on his death. The viscountcy of Clifden and barony of Mendip were passed on to his second cousin, Thomas Agar-Robartes, 2nd Baron Robartes. Lady Clifden died in May 1914, aged 78.

Parliament of the United Kingdom
Preceded by John Greene; William Shee	Member of Parliament for County Kilkenny; 1857–1874; With: John Greene 1857–1865; George Leopold Bryan 1865–1874	Succeeded by George Leopold Bryan; Patrick Martin
Peerage of Ireland
Preceded by Henry George Agar-Ellis	Viscount Clifden; 1895–1899	Succeeded by Thomas Charles Agar-Robartes
Peerage of the United Kingdom
Preceded by Henry George Agar-Ellis	Baron Dover; 1895–1899	Extinct
