= Pierce Butler (Kilkenny MP, born 1774) =

British politician

Pierce Butler (6 May 1774 – 18 August 1846) was an Irish politician in the United Kingdom House of Commons.

Butler was the son of Edmund Butler, 11th Viscount Mountgarret and Lady Henrietta Butler. He married Anne March, daughter of Thomas March, in 1800. They had eleven children including:

- Pierce Somerset Butler (1801–1865)
- Reverend Edmund John Butler (1804–1873)
- Henry Butler (1805–1881)
- Somerset Butler (1808–1850)
- Thomas Butler (1810–1848)
- William Butler (1814–1847)
- Walter Butler (1821–1900)

Pierce Butler was elected to the United Kingdom House of Commons as Member of Parliament for County Kilkenny in 1832, and held the seat until his death in 1846. In the House he spoke against Tithe enforcement and against the continuation of the Act of Union.

He served as M.P. with his son Pierce Somerset. Butler gained the rank of Colonel in the service of the Kilkenny Militia. He died on 13 June 1846 at age 72.

Parliament of the United Kingdom
Preceded by John Ponsonby, Viscount Duncannon; John Butler, Earl of Ossory	Member of Parliament for County Kilkenny; 1832 – 1846; With: William Francis Finn 1832–1837); George Bryan 1837–1843; Pierce Somerset Butler 1843–1846	Succeeded by Pierce Somerset Butler; Richard Smithwicke
