= Walter Ponsonby, 7th Earl of Bessborough =

Irish noble (1821–1906)

The Earl of Bessborough
- Born: 13 August 1821; Roehampton, London
- Died: 24 February 1906 (aged 84); London, England
- Spouse: Lady Louisa Susan Cornwallis Eliot (m. 1850)
- Father: John Ponsonby, 4th Earl of Bessborough
- Mother: Lady Maria Fane

Rev. Walter William Brabazon Ponsonby, 7th Earl of Bessborough (13 August 1821 – 24 February 1906) was an Anglo-Irish aristocrat and Anglican priest.

== Early life and education ==
Ponsonby was born in Roehampton, London, the fifth son of John Ponsonby, 4th Earl of Bessborough, and his wife Lady Maria Fane. His parents had 14 children before his mother died in 1834. His father died in 1847.

He was educated at Harrow School and Trinity College, Cambridge.

== Career ==
Ordained a priest in the Church of England in 1845, he was, between 1846 and 1894 he acted as Rector for the parishes of Canford Magna, Wiltshire; Beer Ferris, Devon; Marston Bigot, Somerset; and Stutton, Suffolk.

Ponsonby inherited the earldom on 11 March 1895 after the deaths of his elder brothers John Ponsonby, 5th Earl of Bessborough (1809–1880) and Frederick Ponsonby, 6th Earl of Bessborough (1815–1895) without male heirs.

== Family ==
On 15 January 1850, he married Lady Louisa Susan Cornwallis Eliot, daughter of Edward Granville Eliot, 3rd Earl of St Germans, and his wife Lady Jemima Cornwallis. Together they had eight children:

- Edward Ponsonby, 8th Earl of Bessborough (1 March 1851 – 1 December 1920)
- Lady Maria Ponsonby (4 June 1852 – 19 November 1949)
- Hon. Cyril Walter Ponsonby (8 September 1853 – 29 November 1927), married Emily Harriet Eyre Addington
- Hon. Granville Ponsonby (13 September 1854 – 24 February 1924), married Mabel Jackson
- Hon. Arthur Cornwallis Ponsonby (8 January 1856 – 25 April 1918), married Kathleen Eva Sillery
- Lady Ethel Jemima Ponsonby (8 April 1857 – 22 June 1940), married George Somerset, 3rd Baron Raglan
- Hon. Walter Gerald Ponsonby (31 July 1859 – 28 April 1934)
- Lady Sara Kathleen Ponsonby (5 August 1861 – 10 June 1936), married Maj. Charles Lancelot Andrews Skinner

== Arms ==
Coat of arms of Walter Ponsonby, 7th Earl of Bessborough
Crest Out of a ducal coronet Azure three arrows one in pale and two in saltire points downward entwined by a snake Proper. Escutcheon Gules a chevron between three combs Argent. Supporters On either side a lion reguardant Proper. Motto Pro Rege Lege Grege (For king, law and people).

Peerage of Ireland
Preceded by Frederick Ponsonby	Earl of Bessborough; 1895–1906	Succeeded by Edward Ponsonby
Preceded by Frederick Ponsonby	Viscount Duncannon; 1895–1906	Succeeded by Edward Ponsonby
Preceded by Frederick Ponsonby	Baron Bessborough; 1895–1906	Succeeded by Edward Ponsonby
Peerage of Great Britain
Preceded by Frederick Ponsonby	Baron Ponsonby of Sysonby; 1895–1906	Succeeded by Edward Ponsonby
Peerage of the United Kingdom
Preceded by Frederick Ponsonby	Baron Duncannon; 1895–1906	Succeeded by Edward Ponsonby
