= John Ponsonby, 4th Earl of Bessborough =

British politician (1781–1847)

The Right Honourable The Earl of Bessborough PC
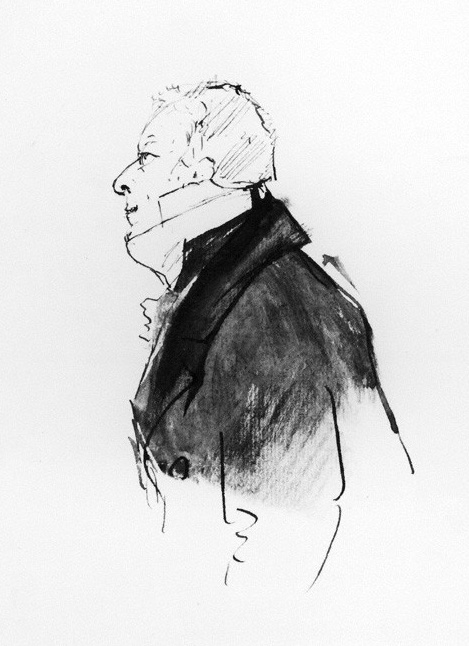

Home Secretary
- In office 19 July 1834 – 15 November 1834
- Monarch: William IV
- Prime Minister: The Viscount Melbourne
- Preceded by: The Viscount Melbourne
- Succeeded by: The Duke of Wellington

Lord Lieutenant of Ireland
- In office 8 July 1846 – 16 May 1847
- Monarch: Victoria
- Prime Minister: Lord John Russell
- Preceded by: The Lord Heytesbury
- Succeeded by: The Earl of Clarendon

Personal details
- Born: John William Ponsonby; 31 August 1781
- Died: 16 May 1847 (aged 65) Dublin
- Party: Whig
- Spouse(s): Lady Maria Fane (1787–1834)
- Children: 14, including John, Frederick, Emily, Walter, and Spencer
- Parent(s): Frederick Ponsonby, 3rd Earl of Bessborough; Lady Henrietta Spencer
- Education: Christ Church, Oxford

John William Ponsonby, 4th Earl of Bessborough, PC (31 August 1781 – 16 May 1847), known as Viscount Duncannon from 1793 to 1844, was a British Whig politician. He was notably Home Secretary in 1834 and served as Lord Lieutenant of Ireland between 1846 and 1847, the first years of the Great Famine.

== Background and education ==
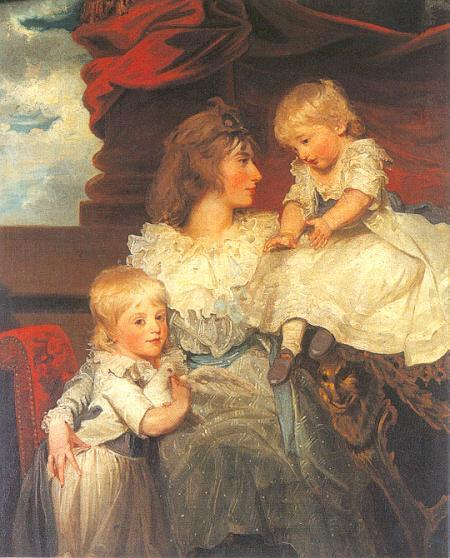
Henrietta Ponsonby, Countess of Bessborough, with her sons William and John by John Hoppner (1787)

A member of the prominent Ponsonby family of Cumberland, he was the eldest son of Frederick Ponsonby, 3rd Earl of Bessborough, and Lady Henrietta Frances Spencer, daughter of John Spencer, 1st Earl Spencer. Sir Frederick Ponsonby and William Ponsonby, 1st Baron de Mauley, were his younger brothers, while Lady Caroline Lamb was his younger sister. Ponsonby's mother was Lord Granville's lover before his marriage to Lady Harriet Cavendish, the Countess of Bessborough's niece. Lord Granville fathered two illegitimate children through her: Harriette Stewart and George Stewart. Lord Bessborough was educated at Harrow and Christ Church, Oxford.

== Political career ==
He was First Commissioner of Woods and Forests under Lord Grey (1831–1834) and served under Lord Melbourne in that office (1835–1841), briefly as Home Secretary (1834), and as Lord Privy Seal (1835–1839). Later, he served as Lord Lieutenant of Ireland under Lord John Russell from 1846 until his death on 16 May 1847. During his service, the Great Famine (Ireland) progressed. He was made a Privy Counsellor in 1831, and in 1834, ten years before he succeeded his father, he was created Baron Duncannon, of Bessborough in the County of Kilkenny. He was Lord Lieutenant of Kilkenny from November 1838 until his death.

He had a stammer, which made him a very reluctant public speaker, believing that it hampered his political career. As Lord Duncannon, he was unkindly nicknamed "Dumbcannon". In private, on the other hand, he was regarded as a valued colleague in Government, due largely to his ability to keep his head in a crisis. He was one of the so-called Committee of Four who drafted the Reform Act 1832.

== Marriage and issue ==
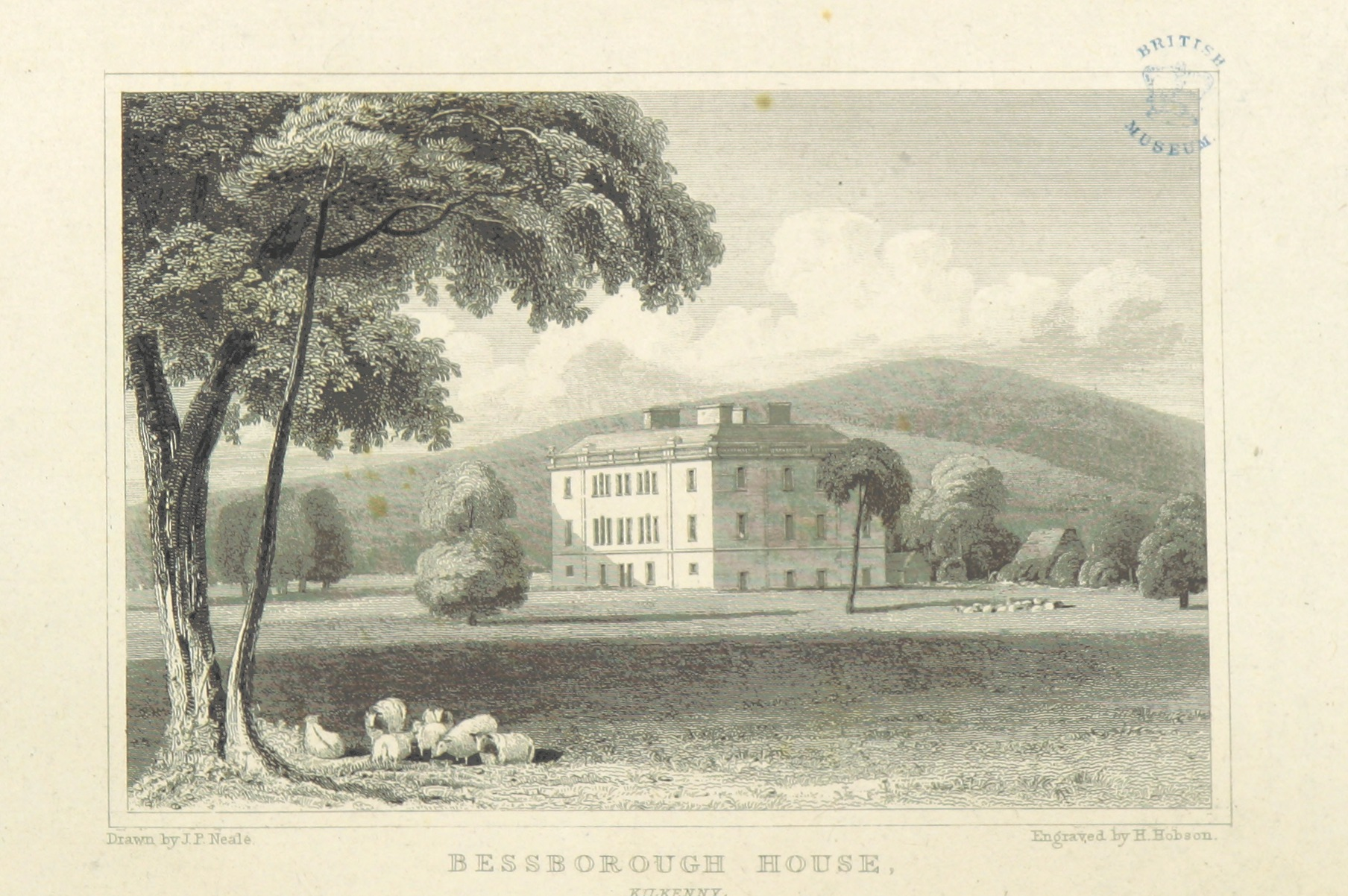
Bessborough House, family seat of the Earls of Bessborough, in County Kilkenny, Ireland (1818)

John Ponsonby married Lady Maria Fane, daughter of John Fane, 10th Earl of Westmorland, and his wife Sarah (née Child), on 16 November 1805 at Berkeley Square, London. They had eight sons and six daughters.

Their daughter Lady Emily Charlotte Mary remained unmarried, but she wrote several novels which were published without attribution. Through his daughter Lady Augusta Gore, Bessborough was the grandfather of sportsman Spencer Gore, who won the first Wimbledon singles title in 1877; and the Rt. Rev. Charles Gore, the Bishop of Oxford, and barrister Sir Francis Charles Gore.

Children of Lord and Lady Bessborough:

- Lady Georgiana Sarah Ponsonby (15 August 1807 – 25 June 1861), married Rev. Sackville Bourke, nephew of the Earl of Mayo.
- John George Brabazon Ponsonby, 5th Earl of Bessborough (14 October 1809 – 28 January 1880)
- William Wentworth Brabazon Ponsonby (29 December 1812 – 8 July 1831)
- Lady Augusta Lavinia Priscilla Ponsonby (11 May 1814 – 19 November 1904), married firstly William Petty-FitzMaurice, Earl of Kerry, 1834; secondly, the Hon. Charles Alexander Gore, 1845
- Frederick George Brabazon Ponsonby, 6th Earl of Bessborough (11 September 1815 – 11 March 1895)
- Lady Emily Charlotte Mary Ponsonby (17 February 1817 – 3 February 1877)
- Lady Maria Jane Elizabeth Ponsonby (14 March 1819 – 13 September 1897) married her cousin, Hon. Charles Ponsonby, 2nd Baron de Mauley
- Hon. George Arthur Brabazon Ponsonby (17 May 1820 – 1841)
- Reverend Walter William Brabazon Ponsonby, 7th Earl of Bessborough (13 August 1821 – 24 February 1906)
- Rt. Hon. Sir Spencer Cecil Ponsonby-Fane (14 March 1824 – 1 December 1915)
- Lady Harriet Frederica Anne Ponsonby (17 June 1825 – 16 November 1900)
- Lady Kathleen Louisa Georgina Ponsonby (30 August 1826 – 9 July 1863), married Frederick Edward Bunbury Tighe.
- Son died in infancy (28 May 1828 – 5 July 1828)
- Hon. Gerald Henry Brabazon Ponsonby (17 July 1829 – 30 November 1908), married Maria Emma Catherine Coventry.

The Viscountess Duncannon died in March 1834 at the age of 46. Lord Bessborough survived her by thirteen years and died in May 1847, aged 65. He was succeeded in the earldom by his eldest son, John, and subsequently by his younger sons Frederick and Walter.Bessborough Gardens in London was named in his honor

== Arms ==
Coat of arms of John Ponsonby, 4th Earl of Bessborough
Crest Out of a ducal coronet Azure three arrows one in pale and two in saltire points downward entwined by a snake Proper. Escutcheon Gules a chevron between three combs Argent. Supporters On either side a lion reguardant Proper. Motto Pro Rege Lege Grege (For king, law and people).

Parliament of the United Kingdom
Preceded by William Cavendish; Lord John Townshend	Member of Parliament for Knaresborough; 1805–1806; With: Lord John Townshend	Succeeded by Viscount Ossulston; Lord John Townshend
Preceded by William Windham	Member of Parliament for Higham Ferrers; 1810–1812	Succeeded by William Plumer
Preceded by Sir Robert Dundas; Bryan Cooke	Member of Parliament for Malton; 1812–1826; With: John Ramsden	Succeeded by John Ramsden; Viscount Normanby
Preceded by Viscount Bernard	Member of Parliament for Bandon; 1826	Succeeded by Lord John Russell
Preceded by Hon. Frederick Ponsonby; Charles Clarke	Member of Parliament for Kilkenny County; 1826–1832; With: Charles Clarke 1826–1830; Earl of Ossory 1830–1832	Succeeded by Pierce Butler; William Finn
Preceded by Thomas Denman; Sir Ronald Craufurd Ferguson	Member of Parliament for Nottingham; 1832–1834; With: Sir Ronald Craufurd Ferguson	Succeeded by Sir Ronald Craufurd Ferguson; Sir John Cam Hobhouse, Bt
Political offices
Preceded by George Agar-Ellis	First Commissioner of Woods and Forests; 1831–1834	Succeeded by Sir John Cam Hobhouse, Bt
Preceded by The Viscount Melbourne	Home Secretary; 1834	Succeeded by Henry Goulburn
Preceded by The Lord Wharncliffe	Lord Privy Seal; 1835–1840	Succeeded by The Earl of Clarendon
Preceded by Lord Granville Somerset	First Commissioner of Woods and Forests; 1835–1841	Succeeded by Earl of Lincoln
Preceded by The Lord Heytesbury	Lord Lieutenant of Ireland; 1846–1847	Succeeded by The Earl of Clarendon
Honorary titles
New title	Lord Lieutenant of Carlow; 1830–1838	Succeeded by Viscount Duncannon
Preceded by The Marquess of Ormonde	Lord Lieutenant of Kilkenny; 1838–1847	Succeeded by William Tighe
Peerage of Ireland
Preceded by Frederick Ponsonby	Earl of Bessborough; 1844–1847	Succeeded by John Ponsonby
Preceded by Frederick Ponsonby	Viscount Duncannon; 1844–1847	Succeeded by John Ponsonby
Preceded by Frederick Ponsonby	Baron Bessborough; 1844–1847	Succeeded by John Ponsonby
Peerage of Great Britain
Preceded by Frederick Ponsonby	Baron Ponsonby of Sysonby; 1844–1847	Succeeded by John Ponsonby
Peerage of the United Kingdom
New creation	Baron Duncannon; 1834–1847; Member of the House of Lords (1834–1847)	Succeeded by John Ponsonby
