= Anna Maria Catherine Clarke =

British heiress

Anna Maria Catherine Price-Clarke (c. 1789 – 19 December 1817) was a British heiress, who became Countess of Ormonde by marriage.

== Biography ==
Price-Clarke was the daughter of Job Hart Price-Clarke (formerly Price) and his wife Sarah Price-Clarke (formerly Clarke). She was raised at Sutton Scarsdale Hall in Derbyshire and was the heiress of her maternal uncle Godfrey Bagnall Clarke. Her inherited property included Sutton Scarsdale Hall, Belsize House, Chilcote Hall, Somersall Hall and the Manor of Ulcombe.

She married Walter Butler, Chief Butler of Ireland, 18th Earl of Ormonde, 1st Marquess of Ormonde on 17 March 1805 and was styled Countess of Ormonde. Her husband was 19 years her senior.

Price-Clarke and her husband were painted in companion portraits by William Beechey (1753–1839) when they married. Her portrait is on display as part of the Ormonde Picture Collection at Kilkenny Castle.

She died in 1817 at Belsize House, Hampstead, Middlesex, England. Her death was announced in the Scots Magazine: '"the most noble the Marchioness of Ormonde... in the 28th year of her age." She was commemorated on a mourning ring, which had inscribed in 18ct gold letters: "A.M.C. ORMONDE Died 19 Dec 1817 Aged 27."

She and her husband had no children, so the Marquisate became extinct on his death three years later.
