= Catherine Finn =

Irish printer

- Born: Catherine Butler; 1749? Kilkenny, Ireland
- Died: 1832 (aged 82–83); Kilkenny
- Known for: owner of Finn's Leinster Journal

Catherine Finn (1749? – 1832) was an Irish printer and owner of Finn's Leinster Journal.

== Life ==
Catherine Finn was born Catherine Butler around 1749. She was the daughter of Kilkenny printer, Michael Butler (died 1779). She was married to printer Edmund Finn, founder and printer of Finn's Leinster Journal. After her husband's death on 5 April 1777, Finn continued to print and publish the Journal. She ran the printing business, while raising seven children, until 1805. She sold advertisement space, organised editorial content, and oversaw the printing and the distribution. The Finns were also the local agents for Maredant's Antiscorbutic Drops, Dr Ryan's Antiscorbutic Drops, and Dr Ryan's Pectoral Essence of Colt's Foot, which were also advertised in the Journal. They sold a wide variety of books, text books, annuals and periodicals in their Kilkenny bookshop and stationery office. In 1783, Finn is listed as the Kilkenny agent of the Hibernian Insurance Co. in Wilson's Dublin Directory. Finn died in 1832, aged 83.

The Finn's eldest child, Michael, married Sarah Williams in 1796, the daughter of a Dublin bookseller James Williams (died 1786). Michael made an unsuccessful attempt to run his mother's printing business, changing the tone of the Journal and unsuccessfully applied for a government subvention.

== See also ==
- List of women printers and publishers before 1800
