= Finn's Leinster Journal =

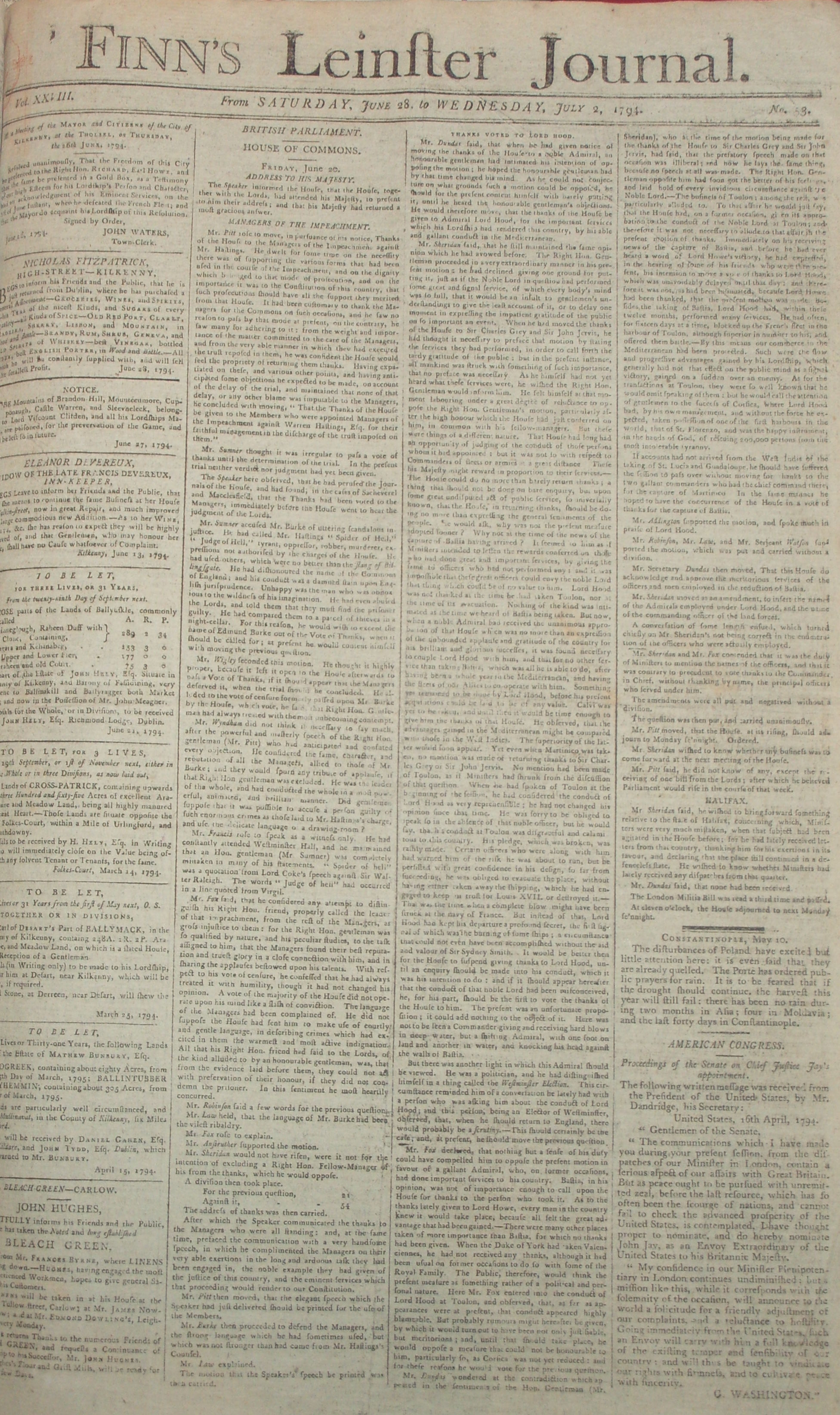
- Owner(s): Edmund Finn, Catherine Finn
- Founder: Edmund Finn
- Founded: 1767
- Ceased publication: 1922
- Headquarters: Kilkenny
- Sister newspapers: Leinster Journal, Kilkenny Journal, Leinster Commercial, Literary Advertiser

Finn's Leinster Journal (1767–1801), later Leinster Journal (1801–1830), Kilkenny Journal and Leinster Commercial and Literary Advertiser (1832–1922), was a newspaper published in Kilkenny, Ireland.

The journal was published on Wednesdays and Saturdays, at a cost of 4d. The paper recirculated news from British and other foreign papers, as well as covering local events and advertisements.

Founded by Edmund Finn in 1767, it brought prosperity to the Finn family. In 1777 after the death of her husband, Catherine Finn became famous for running the paper while raising seven children. The journal circulated widely among the Catholic merchant and wealthy farming classes of south Leinster and east Munster.

It was later taken over by Patrick Kearney, who renamed it the Leinster Journal.

== See also ==
- List of newspapers in Ireland
- List of newspapers in Kilkenny
- Media in Kilkenny
