= George Leopold Bryan =

George Leopold Bryan (1828 – 29 June 1880) was an Irish politician in the United Kingdom House of Commons.

He was elected to the United Kingdom House of Commons as Member of Parliament for County Kilkenny in 1865, and held the seat until 1880.

Parliament of the United Kingdom
Preceded by John Greene; Leopold Agar-Ellis	Member of Parliament for County Kilkenny; 1865 – 1880; With: Leopold Agar-Ellis 1865–1874; Patrick Martin 1874–1880	Succeeded by Patrick Martin; Edward Marum
