= County Kilkenny (UK Parliament constituency) =

UK parliamentary constituency in Ireland, 1801–1885

- Former county constituency for the House of Commons
- County: County Kilkenny

1801–1885
- Seats: 2
- Created from: County Kilkenny (IHC)
- Replaced by: North Kilkenny; South Kilkenny

County Kilkenny was a former UK Parliament county constituency in County Kilkenny in Ireland. The County constituency returned two Members of Parliament (MPs) in the House of Commons of the United Kingdom of Great Britain and Ireland, from 1801 until 1885.

County Kilkenny constituency was an original constituency represented in Parliament when the Acts of Union 1800 by Great Britain and Ireland took effect on 1 January 1801, and remained in existence until its abolition in 1885 when it was replaced by North Kilkenny and South Kilkenny.

== Boundaries ==
County Kilkenny constituency was made up of the traditional county except for the borough constituency of Kilkenny City for Kilkenny.

This constituency comprised the whole of County Kilkenny, except for the parliamentary borough of Kilkenny City.

== Members of Parliament ==
Year	1st member	1st party	2nd member	2nd party
1801, 1 January	William Ponsonby, later Baron Ponsonby	Whig	James Butler, later Marquess of Ormonde	
1806, 12 April	George Ponsonby		James Butler, later Marquess of Ormonde	
1806, 21 November	Frederick Ponsonby		James Butler, later Marquess of Ormonde	
1820, 11 September	Frederick Ponsonby		Charles Clarke	Whig
1826, 22 June	John Ponsonby, Viscount Duncannon, later Earl of Bessborough	Whig	Charles Clarke	Whig
1830, 12 August	John Ponsonby, Viscount Duncannon, later Earl of Bessborough	Whig	John Butler, Earl of Ossory, later Marquess of Ormonde	Whig
1832, 20 December	Pierce Butler	Repeal Association	William Francis Finn	Repeal Association
1837, 12 August	Pierce Butler	Repeal Association	George Bryan	Whig
1843, 1 December	Pierce Butler	Repeal Association	Pierce Somerset Butler	Repeal Association
1846, 29 July	Richard Smithwicke	Repeal Association	Pierce Somerset Butler	Repeal Association
1847, 18 August	John Greene	Repeal Association	Pierce Somerset Butler	Repeal Association
1852, 26 July	John Greene	Ind. Irish	William Shee	Ind. Irish
1857, 13 April	John Greene	Ind. Irish	Leopold Agar-Ellis	Whig
1859, 20 May	John Greene	Liberal	Leopold Agar-Ellis	Liberal
1865, 24 July	George Leopold Bryan	Liberal	Leopold Agar-Ellis	Liberal
1874, 10 February	George Leopold Bryan	Home Rule League	Patrick Martin	Home Rule League
1880, 15 April	Edward Marum	Parnellite Home Rule League	Patrick Martin	Home Rule League
1885	Constituency abolished: see North Kilkenny and South Kilkenny			

== Elections ==
=== Elections in the 1830s ===
General election 1830: County Kilkenny
Party	Candidate	Votes	%
Whig	John Ponsonby	Unopposed	
Whig	John Butler	Unopposed	
Registered electors		1,078	
Whig hold			
Whig hold			

Ponsonby was appointed as First Commissioner of Woods and Forests, requiring a by-election.

By-election, 28 February 1831: County Kilkenny
Party	Candidate	Votes	%
Whig	John Ponsonby	336	55.5
Repeal	Pierce Butler	269	44.5
Majority		67	11.0
Turnout		605	c. 53.1
Registered electors		c. 1,139	
Whig hold			

General election 1831: County Kilkenny
Party	Candidate	Votes	%
Whig	John Ponsonby	Unopposed	
Whig	John Butler	Unopposed	
Registered electors		1,139	
Whig hold			
Whig hold			

General election 1832: County Kilkenny
Party	Candidate	Votes	%
Repeal	Pierce Butler	Unopposed	
Repeal	William Francis Finn	Unopposed	
Registered electors		1,246	
Repeal gain from Whig			
Repeal gain from Whig			

General election 1835: County Kilkenny
Party	Candidate	Votes	%
Repeal (Whig)	Pierce Butler	Unopposed	
Repeal (Whig)	William Francis Finn	Unopposed	
Registered electors		1,262	
Repeal hold			
Repeal hold			

General election 1837: County Kilkenny
Party	Candidate	Votes	%
Repeal (Whig)	Pierce Butler	Unopposed	
Whig	George Bryan	Unopposed	
Registered electors		1,726	
Repeal hold			
Whig gain from Repeal			

=== Elections in the 1840s ===
General election 1841: County Kilkenny
Party	Candidate	Votes	%	±%
Repeal	Pierce Butler	Unopposed		
Whig	George Bryan	Unopposed		
Registered electors		1,530		
Repeal hold				
Whig hold				

Bryan's death caused a by-election.

By-election, 1 December 1843: County Kilkenny
Party	Candidate	Votes	%	±%
Repeal	Pierce Somerset Butler	Unopposed		
Repeal gain from Whig				

Pierce Butler's death caused a by-election.

By-election, 29 July 1846: County Kilkenny
Party	Candidate	Votes	%	±%
Repeal	Richard Smithwicke	Unopposed		
Repeal hold				

General election 1847: County Kilkenny
Party	Candidate	Votes	%	±%
Repeal	John Greene	277	30.1	N/A
Repeal	Pierce Somerset Butler	262	28.5	N/A
Repeal	Charles Hely	241	26.2	N/A
Repeal	Patrick Richard Welch	139	15.1	N/A
Majority		21	2.3	N/A
Turnout		460 (est)	41.6 (est)	N/A
Registered electors		1,107		
Repeal hold		Swing	N/A	
Repeal gain from Whig		Swing	N/A	

=== Elections in the 1850s ===
General election 1852: County Kilkenny
Party	Candidate	Votes	%	±%
Independent Irish	William Shee	2,622	43.6	New
Independent Irish	John Greene	2,537	42.2	+12.1
Conservative	James Wandesford Butler	500	8.3	New
Whig	Leopold Agar-Ellis	350	5.8	New
Majority		2,037	33.9	N/A
Turnout		3,005 (est)	59.7 (est)	+18.1
Registered electors		5,036		
Independent Irish gain from Repeal		Swing	N/A	
Independent Irish gain from Repeal		Swing	N/A	

General election 1857: County Kilkenny
Party	Candidate	Votes	%	±%
Whig	Leopold Agar-Ellis	2,589	39.5	+33.7
Independent Irish	John Greene	1,604	24.5	−17.7
Whig	George Charles Mostyn	1,324	20.2	N/A
Whig	William Shee	1,036	15.8	−27.8
Turnout		3,277 (est)	64.0 (est)	+4.3
Registered electors		5,124		
Majority		985	15.0	N/A
Whig gain from Independent Irish		Swing	+28.2	
Majority		280	4.3	−29.6
Independent Irish hold		Swing	−17.3	

General election 1859: County Kilkenny
Party	Candidate	Votes	%	±%
Liberal	Leopold Agar-Ellis	2,483	31.8	−7.7
Liberal	John Greene	1,992	25.5	+1.0
Liberal	George Henry Moore	1,747	22.4	N/A
Liberal	William Shee	1,590	20.4	+4.6
Majority		245	3.1	−11.9
Turnout		3,906 (est)	73.1 (est)	+9.1
Registered electors		5,347		
Liberal hold		Swing	N/A	
Liberal hold		Swing	N/A	

=== Elections in the 1860s ===
General election 1865: County Kilkenny
Party	Candidate	Votes	%	±%
Liberal	George Leopold Bryan	2,913	44.9	N/A
Liberal	Leopold Agar-Ellis	2,728	42.0	+10.2
Liberal	John Greene	852	13.1	−12.4
Majority		1,876	28.9	+25.8
Turnout		3,247 (est)	63.0 (est)	−10.1
Registered electors		5,151		
Liberal hold		Swing	N/A	
Liberal hold		Swing	N/A	

General election 1868: County Kilkenny
Party	Candidate	Votes	%	±%
Liberal	George Leopold Bryan	Unopposed		
Liberal	Leopold Agar-Ellis	Unopposed		
Registered electors		5,159		
Liberal hold				
Liberal hold				

=== Elections in the 1870s ===
General election 1874: County Kilkenny
Party	Candidate	Votes	%	±%
Home Rule	George Leopold Bryan	2,603	44.2	N/A
Home Rule	Patrick Martin	2,139	36.3	New
Liberal	Leopold Agar-Ellis	1,151	19.5	N/A
Majority		988	16.8	N/A
Turnout		3,522 (est)	66.5 (est)	N/A
Registered electors		5,300		
Home Rule gain from Liberal		Swing	N/A	
Home Rule gain from Liberal		Swing	N/A	

=== Elections in the 1880s ===
General election 1880: County Kilkenny
Party	Candidate	Votes	%	±%
Parnellite Home Rule League	Edward Marum	2,707	42.9	−1.3
Home Rule	Patrick Martin	2,694	42.7	+6.4
Conservative	James Butler	913	14.5	New
Majority		1,781	28.2	+11.4
Turnout		3,620 (est)	73.8 (est)	+7.3
Registered electors		4,907		
Home Rule hold		Swing		
Home Rule hold		Swing		
