= George Bryan (politician, died 1843) =

British politician

George Bryan (1770–1843) was an Irish politician in the United Kingdom House of Commons.

He was elected as a Member of Parliament for the County Kilkenny constituency in 1837, and held the seat until 1843.

Parliament of the United Kingdom
| Preceded by William Francis Finn; Pierce Butler | Member of Parliament for County Kilkenny; 1837 – 1843; With: Pierce Butler | Succeeded by Pierce Butler; Pierce Somerset Butler |
