= Frederick Ponsonby, 6th Earl of Bessborough =

English peer and cricketer

Earl of Bessborough
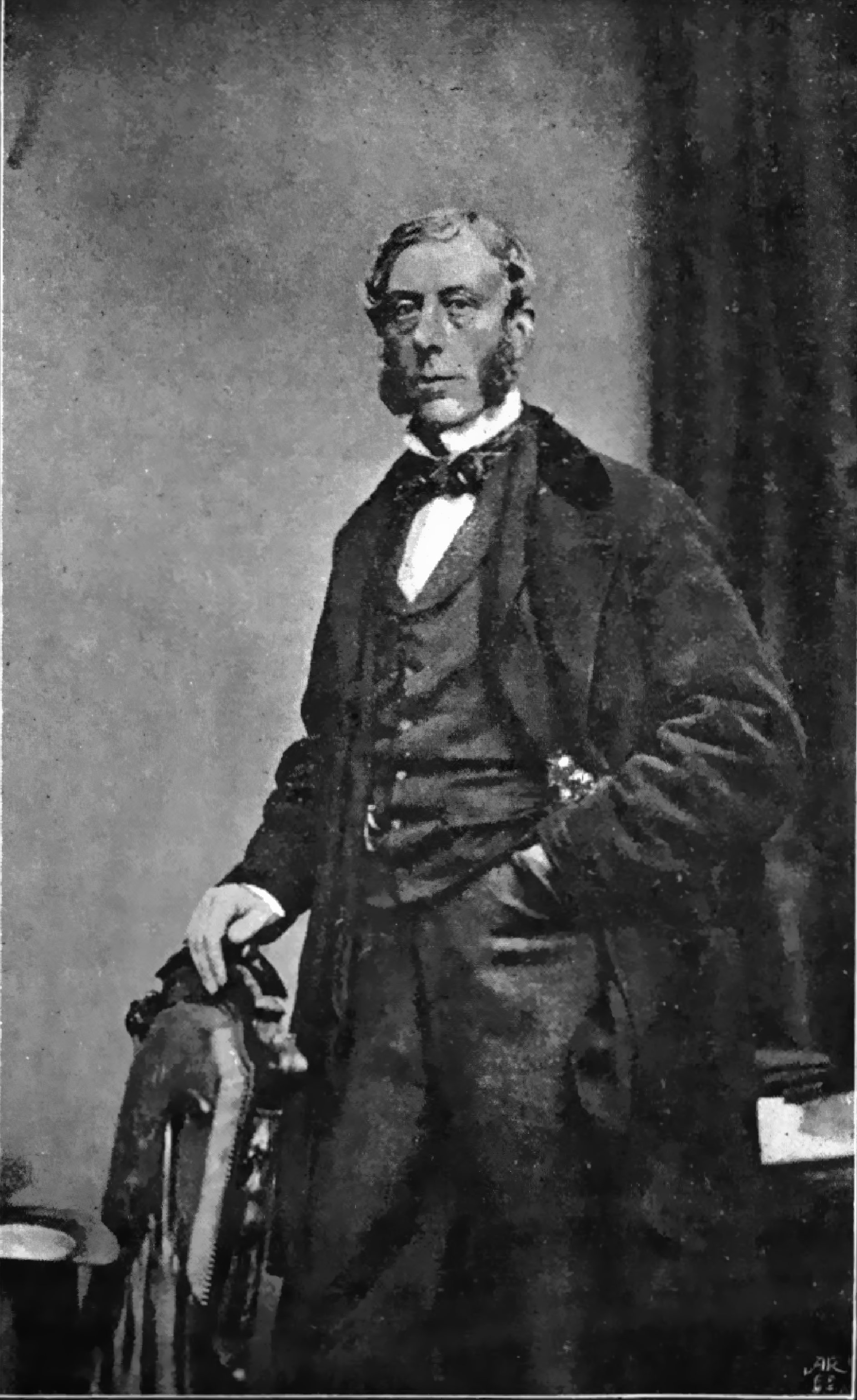
- The 6th Earl of Bessborough
- Born: 11 September 1815
- Died: 11 March 1895 (aged 79)
- Father: John Ponsonby, 4th Earl of Bessborough
- Mother: Lady Maria Fane

Frederick George Brabazon Ponsonby, 6th Earl of Bessborough (11 September 1815 – 11 March 1895), was an Anglo-Irish peer who played first-class cricket 1834–56 for Surrey, Cambridge Town Club (aka Cambridgeshire), Cambridge University (CUCC) and Marylebone Cricket Club (MCC).

== Background and education ==
Ponsonby was born in Marylebone, the third son of John Ponsonby, 4th Earl of Bessborough, and his wife Lady Maria Fane. He was educated at Harrow and Trinity College, Cambridge. In 1837 he was admitted to Lincoln's Inn, and was called to the Bar in 1840. He inherited the earldom on 28 January 1880 when his elder brother died without a male heir.

== Cricket ==
Throughout his cricket career, Bessborough was known as the Hon. Frederic Ponsonby. He played at both Harrow and Cambridge University, batting right-handed. He was an active player until about 1845, after which, due to an arm injury, he could only play sporadically. Ponsonby was a founder of Surrey County Cricket Club and was elected its first vice-president. He was also a founder of I Zingari, and of the Old Stagers amateur theatre company.

== Government ==
He chaired the Bessborough commission on the working of the 1870 Irish Land Act, set up by the second Gladstone administration in June 1880. The commission made radical proposals for increasing the rights of tenants in Ireland.

== Personal life ==
Lord Bessborough died at Westminster on 11 March 1895. He never married, and was succeeded in the earldom by his younger brother, Walter.

He owned 35,000 acres, mostly in Kilkenny and Carlow.

== Arms ==
Coat of arms of Frederick Ponsonby, 6th Earl of Bessborough
| Crest Out of a ducal coronet Azure three arrows one in pale and two in saltire points downward entwined by a snake Proper. Escutcheon Gules a chevron between three combs Argent. Supporters On either side a lion reguardant Proper. Motto Pro Rege Lege Grege (For king, law and people). |

Peerage of Ireland
| Preceded by John Ponsonby | Earl of Bessborough; 1880–1895 | Succeeded by Walter Ponsonby |
| Preceded by John Ponsonby | Viscount Duncannon; 1880–1895 | Succeeded by Walter Ponsonby |
| Preceded by John Ponsonby | Baron Bessborough; 1880–1895 | Succeeded by Walter Ponsonby |
Peerage of Great Britain
| Preceded by John Ponsonby | Baron Ponsonby of Sysonby; 1880–1895 | Succeeded by Walter Ponsonby |
Peerage of the United Kingdom
| Preceded by John Ponsonby | Baron Duncannon; 1880–1895 | Succeeded by Walter Ponsonby |
