= George Darell Shee =

George Darell Shee (12 July 1843 – 15 December 1894, Felixstowe) was an English judge, and oldest son of the Anglo-Irish judge and politician Sir William Shee.

He was educated at Trinity Hall, Cambridge, where he graduated Bachelor of Laws in 1866. He was admitted to the Middle Temple on 6 November 1862, and was called to the bar on 30 April 1867. He joined the south-eastern circuit, became district probate registrar for East Suffolk, and in July 1883 was appointed recorder of Hythe. He married, on 14 October 1873, Jane, eldest daughter of Harry Innes of Thomastown, and died at Landguard Lodge, Felixstowe, on 15 December 1894. He was the author of A Remonstrance (Dublin, 1886), which was addressed to Sir Charles Gavan Duffy, in reply to his attack on Sir William Shee, in a book entitled The League of the North and South.
