= Walter Butler, 1st Marquess of Ormonde =

Irish peer & politician (1770–1820)

Walter Butler, 1st Marquess of Ormonde KP

Member of the Irish House of Commons for County Kilkenny
- In office 1789–1796

Personal details
- Born: 5 February 1770
- Died: 10 August 1820 (aged 50)

Walter Butler, 1st Marquess of Ormonde, KP (5 February 1770 – 10 August 1820) was an Irish peer and politician. Partly to sustain his extravagant lifestyle, Walter gave up his hereditary right to the grant of the prisage of the wines of Ireland for an enormous sum of money. The right had been made to the 4th Chief Butler of Ireland by Edward I of England. Between 1789 and 1796, he sat for County Kilkenny in the Irish House of Commons.

He served as Governor and Custos Rotulorum of County Kilkenny and was a Privy Counsellor in Ireland. He was also Colonel of the Kilkenny Militia.

== Family ==
He was the son of John Butler, 17th Earl of Ormonde and Frances Susan Elizabeth Wandesford. He married Anna Maria Catherine Clarke, daughter of Joseph Hart Pryce Clarke, on 17 March 1805. She was the heiress, as niece to Godfrey Bagnall Clarke, to the Sutton Scarsdale estate. As they had no children, the Marquessate became extinct; the Earldom of Ormonde, however, devolved upon his brother James Wandesford Butler, who subsequently became first Marquess of Ormonde of the second creation, and was made Baron Butler of Llanthony in the Peerage of the United Kingdom. Walter left debts of some £450,000 on his death, and as a result The Derbyshire properties were sold, and Richard Arkwright junior reunited Sutton Scarsdale Hall with the estate.

Parliament of Ireland
Preceded by William Brabazon Ponsonby; Hon. Henry Welbore Agar	Member of Parliament for County Kilkenny; 1789–1796; With: William Brabazon Ponsonby	Succeeded by William Brabazon Ponsonby; Hon. John Wandesford Butler
Peerage of Ireland
New creation	Marquess of Ormonde; 1816–1820	Extinct
Preceded by John Butler	Earl of Ormonde; Earl of Ossory; 1795–1820	Succeeded by James Butler
