= John Ponsonby, 5th Earl of Bessborough =

British cricketer, politician and courtier

The Right Honourable The Earl of Bessborough PC

Lord Steward of the Household
- In office 20 January 1866 – 26 June 1866
- Monarch: Victoria
- Prime Minister: Lord John Russell
- Preceded by: The Earl of St Germans
- Succeeded by: The Duke of Marlborough
- In office 12 December 1868 – 17 February 1874
- Monarch: Victoria
- Prime Minister: William Ewart Gladstone
- Preceded by: The Earl of Tankerville
- Succeeded by: The Earl Beauchamp

Member of the House of Lords (Note: As Baron Ponsonby of Sysonby.)
- Lord Temporal
- In office 16 May 1847 – 28 January 1880
- Preceded by: The 4th Earl of Bessborough
- Succeeded by: The 6th Earl of Bessborough

Personal details
- Born: John George Brabazon Ponsonby; 14 October 1809 London, England
- Died: 28 January 1880 (aged 70)
- Party: Liberal
- Spouse(s): Lady Frances Lambton (m. 1835; died 1835) Lady Caroline Gordon-Lennox (m. 1849)
- Parent(s): John Ponsonby, 4th Earl of Bessborough; Lady Maria Fane
- Other titles: 6th Viscount Duncannon; 6th Baron Bessborough; 5th Baron Ponsonby of Sysonby; 2nd Baron Duncannon

John George Brabazon Ponsonby, 5th Earl of Bessborough (14 October 1809 – 28 January 1880), styled Viscount Duncannon from 1844 until 1847, was a British cricketer, courtier and Liberal politician.

== Background ==
Born in London, Ponsonby was the eldest son of John Ponsonby, 4th Earl of Bessborough, and his wife Lady Maria Fane, third daughter of John Fane, 10th Earl of Westmorland. He was a cricketer in his youth and played five important matches for Marylebone Cricket Club (MCC) in the 1830s.

== Political career ==
Ponsonby entered the House of Commons in the 1831 general election, sitting as a Whig for Bletchingley, where he was returned unopposed. He only sat for a short period, vacating his seat in July in favour of Thomas Hyde Villiers, newly appointed as a minister and requiring a seat. In October, he was offered a seat in the pocket borough of Higham Ferrers, which he held until the seat was disenfranchised at the end of 1832. During 1832, he may have spent some time at the British embassy in Russia.

Following the election, he worked for Lord Palmerston as a précis writer at the Foreign Office, from May 1833 to November 1834, and then stood as a candidate at the 1835 general election. Here, he was returned as a Liberal at Derby, though the campaign was marred by a "bizarre nervous breakdown" brought on by stress, overwork, and the recent death of his mother.

He represented Derby until May 1847, when he succeeded to the earldom on the death of his father, and took up his seat in the House of Lords. Lord Bessborough became a government minister when he was appointed Master of the Buckhounds under Lord John Russell in 1848, an office he held until the fall of the administration in 1852. He held the same office from 1852 to 1855 in Lord Aberdeen's coalition government, from 1855 to 1858 in Lord Palmerston's first administration and again from 1859 to 1866 in Palmerston's and Russell's second administrations. In January 1866 he was appointed Lord Steward of the Household under Russell, a post he held until the Liberals lost power in June 1866, and again between 1868 and 1874 in William Ewart Gladstone's first administration.

Lord Bessborough was also Lord-Lieutenant of Carlow between 1838 and his death in 1880.

== Family ==
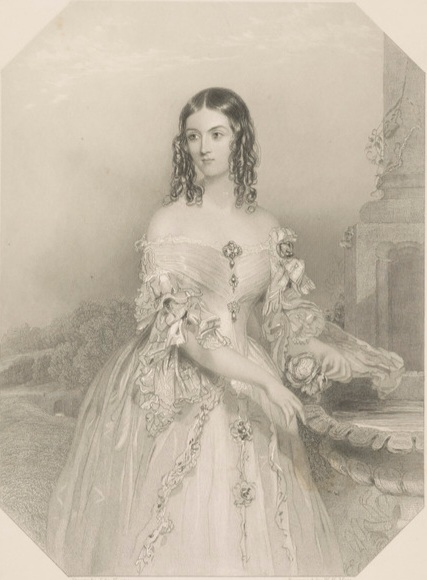
His second wife, Lady Caroline Gordon-Lennox

Lord Bessborough married Lady Frances Lambton, eldest daughter of John Lambton, 1st Earl of Durham, on 8 September 1835. She died on 18 December 1835, and on 4 October 1849, he married Lady Caroline Gordon-Lennox, eldest daughter of Charles Gordon-Lennox, 5th Duke of Richmond. There were no children from the two marriages. He died in January 1880, aged 70, and was succeeded by his younger brother Frederick.

== Arms ==
Coat of arms of John Ponsonby, 5th Earl of Bessborough
Crest Out of a ducal coronet Azure three arrows one in pale and two in saltire points downward entwined by a snake Proper. Escutcheon Gules a chevron between three combs Argent. Supporters On either side a lion reguardant Proper. Motto Pro Rege Lege Grege (For king, law and people).

== Notes ==
Parliament of the United Kingdom
Preceded by Charles Tennyson; Sir William Horne	Member of Parliament for Bletchingley; April 1831 – July 1831; With: Charles Tennyson	Succeeded by The Viscount Palmerston; Thomas Hyde Villiers
Preceded by Charles Pepys	Member of Parliament for Higham Ferrers; 1831–1832	Constituency abolished
Preceded by Henry Cavendish; Edward Strutt	Member of Parliament for Derby; 1835–1847; With: Edward Strutt	Succeeded by Edward Strutt; Hon. Frederick Leveson-Gower
Political offices
Preceded by The Earl Granville	Master of the Buckhounds; 1848–1852	Succeeded by The Earl of Rosslyn
Preceded by The Earl of Rosslyn	Master of the Buckhounds; 1852–1858	Succeeded by The Earl of Sandwich
Preceded by The Earl of Sandwich	Master of the Buckhounds; 1859–1866	Succeeded by The Earl of Cork
Preceded by The Earl of St Germans	Lord Steward; January–June 1866	Succeeded by The Duke of Marlborough
Preceded by The Earl of Tankerville	Lord Steward; 1868–1874	Succeeded by The Earl Beauchamp
Honorary titles
Preceded by The 4th Earl of Bessborough	Lord Lieutenant of Carlow; 1838–1880	Succeeded by Arthur Kavanagh
Peerage of Ireland
Preceded by John Ponsonby	Earl of Bessborough; 1847–1880	Succeeded by Frederick Ponsonby
Preceded by John Ponsonby	Viscount Duncannon; 1847–1880	Succeeded by Frederick Ponsonby
Preceded by John Ponsonby	Baron Bessborough; 1847–1880	Succeeded by Frederick Ponsonby
Peerage of Great Britain
Preceded by John Ponsonby	Baron Ponsonby of Sysonby; 1847–1880; Member of the House of Lords (1847–1880)	Succeeded by Frederick Ponsonby
Peerage of the United Kingdom
Preceded by John Ponsonby	Baron Duncannon; 1847–1880	Succeeded by Frederick Ponsonby
