= John Wandesford, 1st Earl Wandesford =

Anglo-Irish peer

John Wandesford, 1st Earl Wandesford FRS (24 May 1725 – 12 January 1784) was an Anglo-Irish peer.

== Biography ==
Wandesford was the son of George Wandesford, 4th Viscount Castlecomer and Susannah Griffith, daughter of Reverend John Griffith and Susannah Cross, and great-granddaughter of Edward Worth, Bishop of Killaloe. He succeeded to his father's viscountcy on 25 June 1751, and took his seat in the Irish House of Lords on 22 November that same year. He was elevated on 1 August 1758 when he was created Earl Wandesford in the Peerage of Ireland.

He was elected a Fellow of the Royal Society on 4 April 1774.

=== Marriage and descendants ===
He married Agnes Elizabeth Southwell, daughter and sole heiress of John Southwell of Enniscourt, County Limerick and Sarah Rose, daughter of Henry Rose, justice of the Court of King's Bench (Ireland), on 11 August 1750; the marriage produced two children:

- John Wandesforde, Viscount Castlecomer (b. 1753, died before 1784)
- Lady Frances Susan Anne Wandesforde (1754 - 1830), who married John Butler of Kilkenny Castle (later 17th Earl of Ormonde & 11th Earl of Ossory) in 1769.

As Lord Wandesforde outlived his only surviving son John, his titles became extinct upon his death, and his daughter Anne, Countess of Ormond and Ossory inherited his estates.

=== Legacy ===
In his will, Lord Wandesforde bequeathed his estate to his only surviving child Anne and her descendants, with the caveat that the Wandesforde estates should not be inherited by the senior line of the Earls of Ormonde. Following Anne's death in 1830, the estate passed to her fourth surviving son the Hon. Charles Butler (who had adopted several additional surnames as a result of various inheritances from his mother and eldest brother, and bore the name The Hon. Charles Butler-Clarke-Southwell-Wandesforde in his later years).

Peerage of Ireland
New creation	Earl Wandesford; 1758–1784	Extinct
Preceded by George Wandesford	Viscount Castlecomer; 1751–1784	Extinct
