= Edmund Donellan =

Irish Anglican clergyman

Edmund Donellan was an Irish Anglican clergyman.

The second son of Nehemiah Donnellan, Archbishop of Tuam from 1595 to 1609, he was educated at Trinity College, Dublin; and held incumbencies at Clonemore and Castledough. He was Archdeacon of Cashel from 1616 until 1640.

Religious titles
Preceded by Thomas Wilson	Archdeacon of Cashel; 1616–1640	Succeeded by Nicholas Proude
