= Cox baronets of Dunmanway (1706) =

Extinct baronetcy in the Baronetage of Ireland

Cox baronets
- Escutcheon of the Cox baronets of Dunmanway
- Creation date: 1706
- Status: extinct
- Extinction date: 1873
- Motto: Fide et fortitudine, By fidelity and fortitude

The Cox Baronetcy, of Dunmanway in the County of Cork, was created in the Baronetage of Ireland on 21 November 1706 for Richard Cox, Lord Chancellor of Ireland. The second Baronet represented Clonakilty in the Irish House of Commons. The title presumably became extinct on the death of the 12th Baronet in 1873.

== Cox baronets, of Dunmanway (1706) ==
- Sir Richard Cox, 1st Baronet (1650–1733)
- Sir Richard Cox, 2nd Baronet (1702–1766)
- Sir Michael Cox, 3rd Baronet (c. 1730–1772)
- Sir Richard Eyre Cox, 4th Baronet (c. 1765–1783)
- Sir Richard Cox, 5th Baronet (1769–1786)
- Sir John Cox, 6th Baronet (1771–1832)
- Sir George Matthias Cox, 7th Baronet (1777–1838)
- Sir Richard Cox, 8th Baronet (died 1846)
- Sir Francis Cox, 9th Baronet (1769–1856)
- Sir Ralph Hawtrey Cox, 10th Baronet (1808–1872)
- Sir Michael Cox, 11th Baronet (1810–1872)
- Sir Francis Hawtrey Cox, 12th Baronet (c. 1816–1873)

== Title claimants ==
There were claimants to the title, including most notably the historian and Church of England clergyman, George William Cox, Edmund Charles Cox and Captain John Hawtrey Reginald Cox. These were ultimately rejected, by the Privy council in 1911 and again in 1915.

== Extended family ==
Richard Cox (died 1581), Bishop of Ely and Chancellor of Oxford, was the great-great-grandfather of the first Baronet.

== See also ==
- Cox baronets
