= Custos Rotulorum of County Cork =

Position in County Cork, Ireland

The Custos Rotulorum of County Cork was the highest civil officer in County Cork, Ireland. The position was later combined with that of Lord Lieutenant of Cork.

== Incumbents ==
- 1660–1698 Richard Boyle, 1st Earl of Burlington
- ?–1807 Richard Boyle, 2nd Earl of Shannon
- 1807–1842 Henry Boyle, 3rd Earl of Shannon

For later custodes rotulorum, see Lord Lieutenant of Cork
