= Abel Ladaveze =

Irish Anglican clergyman

Abel Ladaveze was an Irish Anglican clergyman.

He was born in Dublin, and educated at Trinity College Dublin. He was Archdeacon of Cashel from 1767 until his death a year later.

Religious titles
Preceded by Daniel Hearne	Archdeacon of Cashel; 1766–1767	Succeeded by Michael Cox
