= Edward Dominic O'Brien =

Irish lawman and British military officer

Captain Edward Dominic O'Brien (1735 - 1 March 1801) was an Irish law enforcement official and British Army officer.

== Life ==
Edward Dominic O'Brien was the son of Capt. James O'Brien, M.P. for Youghal, and Mary Jephson. He was born in 1735 at Drogheda, while his father was serving in Parliament. Coming from a military family, at a young age, O'Brien joined the British Army and advanced quickly to the rank of Captain. He married Mary Carrick, the daughter of a Dublin attorney.

In 1758, O'Brien relocated to the west of Ireland and resided with his family in Ennistymon House. He served that year as High Sheriff of Clare, and would hold that position again in 1783 and 1787. Captain O'Brien died on 1 March 1801 at his family's estate in Rostellan, County Cork.

== Family ==
Children of Edward Dominic O'Brien and Mary Carrick:

- Murrough O'Brien (1756 - 10 Feb 1808)
- Lady Mary O'Brien (1759 - 23 Jan 1840) Married first to Sir Richard Eyre Cox, 4th Baronet, son of Sir Michael Cox, 3rd Baronet, and Hon. Elizabeth Massy. They had one daughter. Married second to Rt. Hon. William Saurin, Attorney-General for Ireland, and had four sons and one daughter.
- William O'Brien, 2nd Marquess of Thomond (1765 - 21 Aug 1846)
- James O'Brien, 3rd Marquess of Thomond (1769 - 3 Jul 1855)
- Captain John O'Brien (1770–1833)
- Lady Harriet O'Brien (1782 - 1 May 1851) Married to Sir Joseph Wallis Hoare, 3rd Baronet, son of Sir Edward Hoare, 2nd Baronet, and Clotilda Wallis. They had five sons and eight daughters.
- Captain Edward O'Brien RN (1780 - 9 Mar 1824) Married first to Diana Hotham, daughter of General George Hotham and Diana Pennyman. Married second to Gertrude Grace Methuen, daughter of Paul Methuen, 1st Baron Methuen and Matilda Gooch. They had two daughters. Married third to Lady Elizabeth Susan Somerset, daughter of Henry Somerset, 6th Duke of Beaufort and Lady Charlotte Sophia Leveson-Gower. They had one son. Edward Jr. also had at least one son out of wedlock.
