= Henry Boyle, 3rd Earl of Shannon =

British politician

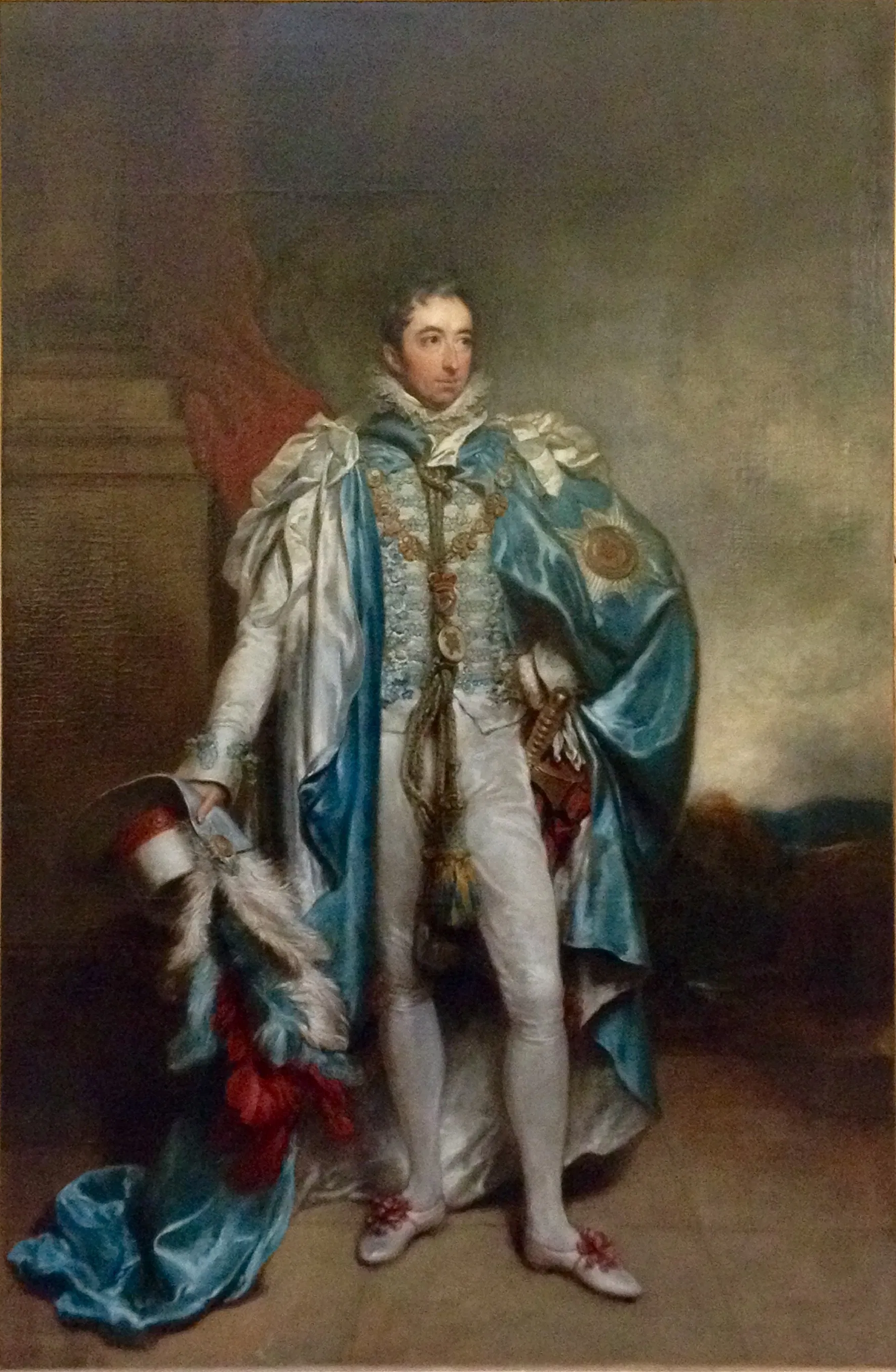
The Earl of Shannon wearing the mantle and collar of a Knight of the Order of Saint Patrick

Henry Boyle, 3rd Earl of Shannon, KP, PC (Ire) (8 August 1771 – 22 April 1842), styled Viscount Boyle from 1764 until 1807, was an Anglo-Irish politician and peer who was one of the last surviving members of the Parliament of Ireland. He represented County Cork in the Parliament of the United Kingdom from 1801 to 1807. He then briefly served as Member of Parliament for Bandon in 1807, succeeding as Earl of Shannon later in the same year. He served as Custos rotulorum for County Cork from 1807 to his death. He was the first Lord Lieutenant of Cork from 1831 to his death.

== Family ==
He was a son of Richard Boyle, 2nd Earl of Shannon, and Catherine Ponsonby. His sister Catherine Henrietta Boyle married Francis Bernard, 1st Earl of Bandon. T

== Career ==
=== Parliament of Ireland ===
Boyle was educated at Winchester College. He represented the borough of Clonakilty in the Irish Parliament from 1793 until 1797 and then County Cork from 1797 until the Act of Union in 1801. In 1798, he was also elected for Rathcormack, however, chose not to sit. According to his obituary in The Gentleman's Magazine, Boyle "took an active part in arming the yeomanry in Ireland." On 31 October 1796 Boyle was commissioned Captain of five different units, those of Castlemartyr, Cloyne, Cove, Imokilly and Middleton. At the time the Kingdom of Great Britain and the Kingdom of Ireland were under personal union. The Yeomanry were volunteer regiments raised in many counties from yeomen. Their purpose was to strengthen the defence of the two Kingdoms which faced the threat of an invasion by the French First Republic.

The Irish Rebellion of 1798 was assisted by a French invasion force under Jean Joseph Amable Humbert. The rebellion and the invasion failed. To secure control of Ireland, the Parliament of Ireland and the Parliament of Great Britain negotiated a merger of the two kingdoms. The Act of Union 1800 resulted in the formation of the United Kingdom of Great Britain and Ireland. The final passage of the Act in the Irish Parliament was achieved with substantial majorities, achieved in part, according to contemporary documents, through bribery, in the form of peerages and honours to critics to get their votes. Whereas the first attempt had been defeated in the Irish House of Commons by 109 votes against to 104 for, the second vote in 1800 produced a result of 158 to 115. By agreement, Ireland gained 100 seats in the British House of Commons and 32 seats in the House of Lords: 28 Irish representative peer elected for life, and four clergymen of the (Anglican) Church of Ireland, chosen for each session.

=== Parliament of the United Kingdom ===
Boyle was among the new Members of the House of Commons, representing County Cork in the new Parliament of the United Kingdom from 1801 to 1807. There was no actual 1801 United Kingdom general election. All members of the House of Commons entered it by right of their previous election to seats in Great Britain or Ireland. County Cork also had a second representative in the person of Robert Uniacke Fitzgerald. They are both listed among the Members of the 1st UK Parliament from Ireland. Boyle and Fitzgerald run unopposed in the 1802 United Kingdom general election. They were both among the Members of the 2nd UK Parliament from Ireland.

On 6 August 1803, Boyle was commissioned captain of a sixth unit, that of Youghal. During the 1st and 2nd Parliaments Boyle was not listed as either a Tory or a Whig. However, he ran as a Whig in the 1806 United Kingdom general election. He was elected alongside George Ponsonby, a fellow Whig. Their faction was at the time under the leadership of Charles Grey, 2nd Earl Grey.

In the 1807 United Kingdom general election, Boyle changed his constituency. Ponsonby and James Bernard were elected in County Cork. On 15 May 1807, Boyle was elected Member of Parliament for Bandon He succeeded Courtenay Boyle in the position. Henry was listed as a Tory on this occasion. Possibly indicating support for the political coalition led by William Cavendish-Bentinck, 3rd Duke of Portland. On 18 May 1807, Boyle was also elected in Youghal as a Whig. He succeeded James Bernard.

On 20 May 1807, the 2nd Earl of Shannon died. Henry succeeded him in his titles and left the House of Commons. He served as Custos Rotulorum of County Cork from 1807 to his death. Shannon entered the Privy Council of Ireland in 1808. That same year he became a Knight of St. Patrick. He was the first Lord Lieutenant of Cork from 1831 to his death.

His death reportedly followed "an illness of nearly two years' duration".

== Marriage and children ==
On 7 June 1798, Boyle married Sarah Hyde, daughter of John Hyde of Castle Hyde. Her mother was Sarah Burton. Their twelve children were listed by order of birth in his obituary:

- Lady Catharine Boyle, listed as "unmarried" in 1842.
- The Honourable Richard Boyle, "died an infant in 1803".
- Lady Sarah Boyle, listed as "unmarried" in 1842.
- Lady Harriet Boyle, listed "deceased" in 1842.
- Lady Louisa Grace-Boyle, unmarried in 1842.
- Richard Boyle, 4th Earl of Shannon (12 May 1809 – 1 August 1868).
- Lady Jane Boyle, unmarried in 1842.
- Lady Elizabeth Boyle, unmarried in 1842.
- The Honourable Henry Charles Boyle, "Lieut. Royal Fusiliers". Married Catharine-Sophronia-Jane Ede in 1841.
- Lady Charlotte-Anne Boyle, unmarried in 1842.
- The Honourable Robert Francis Boyle, "born in 1818".
- Lady Frances Boyle, "died in 1824, aged four years".

Parliament of Ireland
| Preceded by Sir Nicholas Colthurst, 3rd Bt; Charles O'Neill | Member of Parliament for Clonakilty; 1793–1797; With: Sir Nicholas Colthurst, 3rd Bt 1793–1796; Thomas Prendergast 1796–1797 | Succeeded by Thomas Prendergast; John Hobson |
| Preceded by Robert King, Viscount Kingsborough; Abraham Morris | Member of Parliament for County Cork; 1797–1801; With: Robert King, Viscount Kingsborough 1797–1798; Robert Uniacke Fitzgerald 1798–1801 | Succeeded by Parliament of the United Kingdom |
| Preceded by Henry Duquery; John Philpot Curran | Member of Parliament for Rathcormack; 1798; With: Charles McDonnell | Succeeded by Charles McDonnell; William Bagwell |
Parliament of the United Kingdom
| New constituency | Member of Parliament for County Cork; 1801–1807; With: Robert Uniacke Fitzgerald 1801–1806; George Ponsonby 1806–1807 | Succeeded by George Ponsonby; James Bernard |
| Preceded by Courtenay Boyle | Member of Parliament for Bandon; 1807 | Succeeded by George Tierney |
| Preceded by James Bernard | Member of Parliament for Youghal; 1807 | Succeeded by Sir John Keane |
Honorary titles
| New office | Lord Lieutenant of Cork; 1831–1842 | Succeeded by The Earl of Bandon |
Peerage of Ireland
| Preceded by Richard Boyle | Earl of Shannon; 1807–1842 | Succeeded by Richard Boyle |
