= Lord Lieutenant of Cork =

Ceremonial officer in Cork, Ireland

This is a list of people who have served as Lord-Lieutenant of County Cork.

There were lieutenants of counties in Ireland until the reign of James II, when they were renamed governors. The office of Lord Lieutenant was recreated on 23 August 1831, and is pronounced in the usual British fashion as 'Lord Lef-tenant'.

== Governors ==
- Charles Wilmot, 1st Viscount Wilmot 1601- (died 1644)
- Robert Phayre 1651–54
- Francis Boyle, 1st Viscount Shannon 1686–1689
- Charles Boyle, 2nd Earl of Burlington 1690– (died 1704)
- Henry Boyle, 1st Earl of Shannon 1756– (died 1764)
- Richard Longfield, 1st Viscount Longueville 1758–1761
- Richard Boyle, 2nd Earl of Shannon 1786– (died 1807)
- Robert King, 2nd Earl of Kingston 1789 (died 1799)
- Robert Uniacke Fitzgerald 1805–1814
- Hayes St Leger, 2nd Viscount Doneraile: 1809–1819
- William Tonson, 2nd Baron Riversdale: 1820–1831
- William O'Brien, 2nd Marquess of Thomond: –1831
- Hayes St Leger, 3rd Viscount Doneraile: –1831
- George King, 3rd Earl of Kingston: –1831
- William Hodder: –1831

== Lord Lieutenants ==
- Henry Boyle, 3rd Earl of Shannon: 7 October 1831 – 22 April 1842
- James Bernard, 2nd Earl of Bandon: 1842 – 31 October 1856
- Edmond Roche, 1st Baron Fermoy: 4 December 1856 – 17 September 1874
- Francis Bernard, 3rd Earl of Bandon: 10 November 1874 – 17 February 1877
- James Bernard, 4th Earl of Bandon: 13 June 1877 – 1922
