= Sir Michael Cox, 3rd Baronet =

Sir Michael Cox, 3rd Baronet (c. 1730 – 18 July 1772) was an Irish baronet and clergyman.

He was the son of Sir Richard Cox, 2nd Baronet and Catherine Evans. He was educated at Trinity College, Dublin. He was Archdeacon of Cashel from 1767 to 1772. He married the Hon. Elizabeth Massy, widow of John Arthur of Seafield, and daughter of Hugh Massy, 1st Baron Massy and his first wife Mary Dawson. They had a son, Sir Richard Eyre Cox, 4th Baronet.

Baronetage of Ireland
Preceded by Richard Cox	Baronet (of Castletown); 1766–1772	Succeeded by Richard Eyre Cox
Church of Ireland titles
Preceded by Abel Ladaveze	Archdeacon of Cashel; 1767–1772	Succeeded by Henry Gervais
