= Sir Richard Eyre Cox, 4th Baronet =

Sir Richard Eyre Cox, 4th Baronet was an Irish baronet.

He was the son of The Ven. Sir Michael Cox, 3rd Baronet, Archdeacon of Cashel from 1767 to 1772, and his wife Elizabeth Massy, daughter of Hugh Massy, 1st Baron Massy and his first wife Mary Dawson, and widow of John Arthur. He married Mary O'Brien, daughter of Edward Dominic O'Brien and his wife Mary Carrick, and great-granddaughter of William O'Brien, 3rd Earl of Inchiquin. They had one daughter. He drowned accidentally on 17 September 1783. His widow remarried William Saurin, who was for many years the Attorney General for Ireland, by whom she had at least four children. She died in 1840.

Baronetage of Ireland
Preceded by Michael Cox	Baronet (of Castletown); 1772–1783	Succeeded by Richard Cox
