= John Dassy =

17th-century clergyman

John Dassy was a 17th-century Anglican clergyman.

Dassy was born in Cardiganshire and was educated at Trinity College, Dublin. He was Archdeacon of Cashel from 1669 until 1691.
