= James O'Brien (died 1771) =

Irish nobleman and politician

Member of the Irish House of Commons for Youghal
- In office 1728–1760
- Preceded by: Arthur Hyde
- Succeeded by: Bellingham Boyle

Personal details
- Born: c. 1700
- Died: 18 December 1771 (aged c. 71)
- Spouse: Mary Jephson
- Children: Anne, Murrough, John, Edward, and Henrietta
- Parent: William O'Brien

Hon. James O'Brien (c. 1700 - 18 December 1771) was an Irish nobleman and politician.

== Life ==
James O'Brien was the son of William O'Brien, 3rd Earl of Inchiquin, and his wife, Mary Villiers, daughter of Sir Edward Villiers. He married Mary Jephson, the daughter of the Very Reverend William Jephson, Dean of Kilmore, and Anne Barry.

From 1725 to 1727, O'Brien sat as a Member of the Irish House of Commons for Charleville. In 1727, he was elected to the Irish House of Commons for Youghal. He held this seat until his retirement in 1760. While serving in Parliament, O'Brien and his family lived in Drogheda, where he held the position of Collector of Customs for the Port of Drogheda. He retired to his brother's estate at Rostellan, County Cork. During his residency there, O'Brien served as Collector of Customs for the Port of Cork until 1767. He died at Rostellan Estate in 1771.

O'Brien also served time as Grand Master of the Freemasons of Munster. He was unanimously elected in 1727. In the army, he held the rank of Captain of Foot.

== Family ==
Children of James O'Brien and Mary Jephson:

- Anne O'Brien (1724 – 19 January 1745) married the Most Reverend Michael Cox, Archbishop of Cashel and died in childbirth with her only son nine months after the wedding.
- Murrough O'Brien, 1st Marquess of Thomond (1726 – 10 February 1808)
- Lieut Hon. John O'Brien RN (1728–1788)
- Capt. Edward Dominic O'Brien (1735 – 1 March 1801) Married Mary Carrick, and had five sons and two daughters.
- Henrietta O'Brien (1737 – 17 November 1797) Married first to Terence O'Loughlin. Married second to Sir William Vigors Burdett, 2nd Baronet Burdett of Dunmore, son of Sir Thomas Burdett, 1st Baronet and Martha Vigors. They had one son.
