= List of knights of St Patrick =

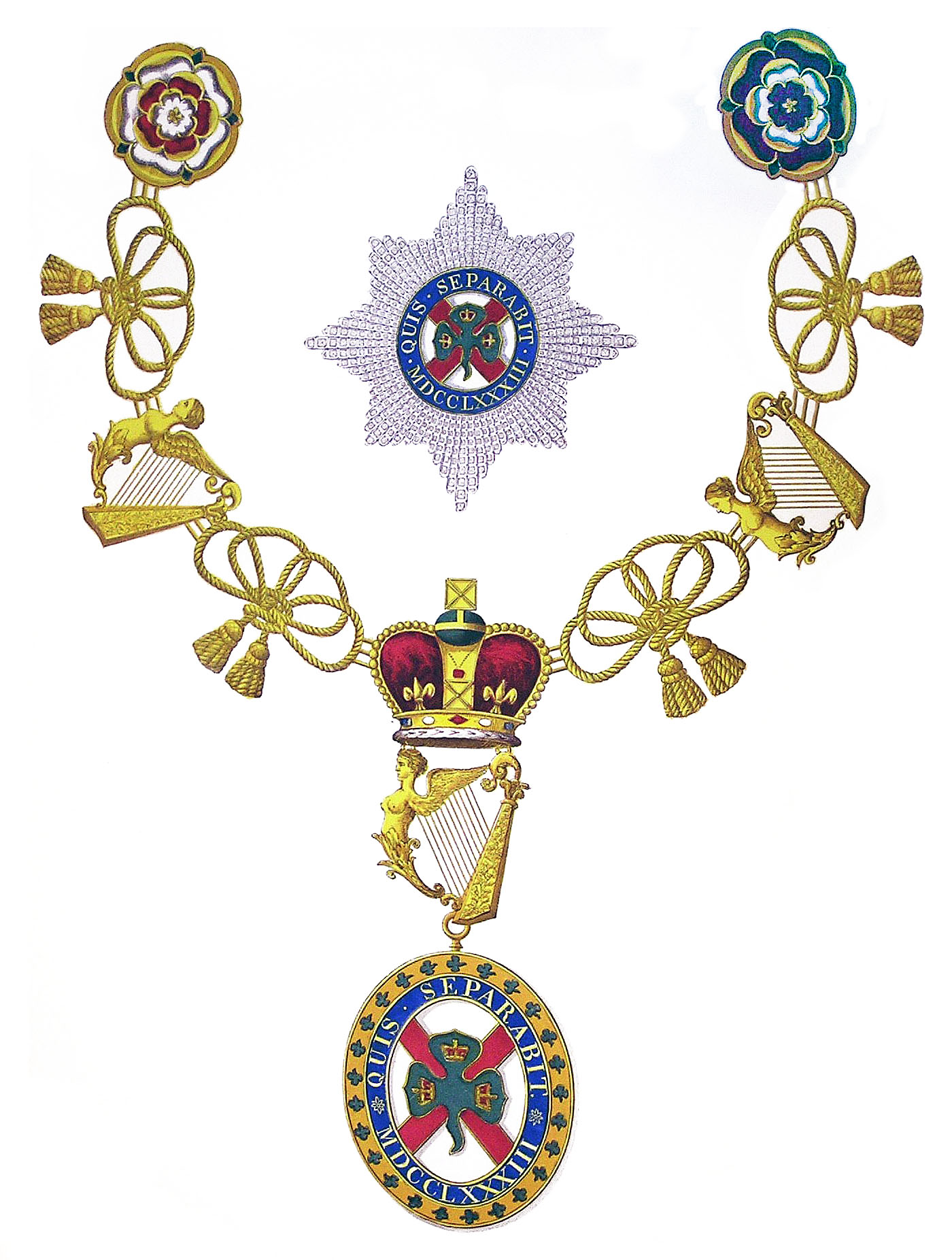
An illustration of the insignia of a Knight of St Patrick

The Most Illustrious Order of St Patrick is a British order of chivalry associated with Ireland. The Order was created in 1783 by King George III at the instigation of the Lord Lieutenant of Ireland, The 3rd Earl Temple (1753–1813; created The 1st Marquess of Buckingham in 1784). The regular creation of knights of St Patrick lasted until 1921, when most of Ireland became independent as the Irish Free State. While the Order technically still exists, no knight of St Patrick has been created since 1936, and the last surviving knight, Prince Henry, Duke of Gloucester, died in 1974. King Charles III, however, remains the Sovereign of the Order. Prior to 1943, the position of herald of the order was held by the Ulster King of Arms; since 1943, it has been held by the combined Norroy and Ulster King of Arms. Saint Patrick is patron of the order; its motto is Quis separabit?, Latin for "Who will separate us?": an allusion to the Vulgate translation of Romans 8:35, "Who shall separate us from the love of Christ?"

The first appointments were made on 11 March 1783, and consisted of 15 Knight Founders, and in total there have been 145 appointments. The original Royal Warrant (dated 5 February 1783) specified that there were to be no more than fifteen knights of the Order at any one time, something that changed in 1821 when George IV appointed an extra six knights (although the royal warrant was not altered to reflect this change until 1830). William IV appointed an additional four knights at his coronation, and on 24 January 1833 increased the maximum number of knights to 22.

Date	Image	Name	Born/Died	Notes
11 March 1783		Prince Edward Augustus	2 November 1767 – 23 January 1820	Knight Founder; later Duke of Kent and Strathearn
11 March 1783		William FitzGerald, 2nd Duke of Leinster	13 March 1749 – 20 October 1804	Knight Founder
11 March 1783		Henry de Burgh, 12th Earl of Clanricarde	8 January 1742 – 8 December 1797	Knight Founder; Later Marquess of Clanricarde
11 March 1783		Thomas Nugent, 6th Earl of Westmeath	April 1714 – 7 September 1790	Knight Founder
11 March 1783		Murrough O'Brien, 5th Earl of Inchiquin	1726 – 10 February 1808	Knight Founder; Later Marquess of Thomond
11 March 1783		Charles Moore, 6th Earl of Drogheda	29 June 1730 – 22 December 1822	Knight Founder; Later Marquess of Drogheda
11 March 1783		George Beresford, 2nd Earl of Tyrone	8 January 1735 – 3 December 1800	Knight Founder; Later Marquess of Waterford
11 March 1783		Richard Boyle, 2nd Earl of Shannon	30 January 1727 – 20 May 1807	Knight Founder
11 March 1783		James Hamilton, 2nd Earl of Clanbrassil	23 August 1730 – 6 February 1798	Knight Founder
11 March 1783		Richard Colley Wellesley, 2nd Earl of Mornington	20 June 1760 – 26 September 1842	Knight Founder; Later Marquess Wellesley, resigned to become a member of the Order of the Garter
11 March 1783		Arthur Gore, 2nd Earl of Arran	25 July 1734 – 8 October 1809	Knight Founder
11 March 1783		James Stopford, 2nd Earl of Courtown	28 May 1731 – 30 March 1810	Knight Founder
11 March 1783		James Caulfeild, 1st Earl of Charlemont	18 August 1728 – 4 August 1799	Knight Founder
11 March 1783		Thomas Taylour, 1st Earl of Bective	20 October 1724 – 14 February 1795	Knight Founder
11 March 1783		Henry Loftus, 1st Earl of Ely	18 November 1709 – 8 May 1783	Knight Founder
5 February 1784		John Proby, 2nd Baron Carysfort	12 August 1751 – 7 April 1828	Later Earl of Carysfort
12 December 1794		Charles Loftus, 1st Earl of Ely	23 January 1738 – 22 March 1806	Later Marquess of Ely
30 March 1795		William Fortescue, 1st Earl of Clermont	5 August 1722 – 30 September 1806	
19 March 1798		Walter Butler, 18th Earl of Ormonde	5 February 1770 – 10 August 1820	Later Marquess of Ormonde
19 March 1798		Charles Dillon, 12th Viscount Dillon	6 November 1745 – 9 November 1813	
5 August 1800		John Browne, 3rd Earl of Altamont	11 June 1756 – 2 January 1809	Later Marquess of Sligo
22 January 1801		Henry Conyngham, 1st Earl Conyngham	26 December 1766 – 28 December 1832	Later Marquess Conyngham
14 March 1806		Henry Beresford, 2nd Marquess of Waterford	23 May 1772 – 16 July 1826	
15 May 1806		Thomas Taylour, 1st Marquess of Headfort	18 November 1757 – 23 October 1829	
13 November 1806		Robert Jocelyn, 2nd Earl of Roden	26 October 1756 – 29 June 1820	
3 November 1807		John Loftus, 2nd Marquess of Ely	15 February 1770 – 23 September 1845	
5 April 1808		Henry Boyle, 3rd Earl of Shannon	8 August 1771 – 22 April 1842	
13 February 1809		Charles O'Neill, 1st Earl O'Neill	22 January 1779 – 25 March 1841	
11 November 1809		William O'Brien, 2nd Marquess of Thomond	1765 – 21 August 1846	
24 March 1810		Howe Browne, 2nd Marquess of Sligo	18 May 1788 – 26 January 1845	
27 April 1810		John Cole, 2nd Earl of Enniskillen	23 March 1768 – 31 March 1840	
17 December 1813		Thomas Pakenham, 2nd Earl of Longford	14 May 1774 – 24 May 1835	
20 August 1821		Prince Ernest Augustus, Duke of Cumberland and Teviotdale	5 June 1771 – 18 November 1851	Later Ernest Augustus I, King of Hanover
20 August 1821		George Chichester, 2nd Marquess of Donegall	14 August 1769 – 5 October 1844	
20 August 1821		Du Pré Alexander, 2nd Earl of Caledon	14 December 1777 – 8 April 1839	Former Governor of the Cape Colony
20 August 1821		Charles Chetwynd-Talbot, 2nd Earl Talbot	25 April 1777 – 10 January 1849	Resigned to accept membership in the Order of the Garter
20 August 1821		James Butler, 19th Earl of Ormonde	15 July 1777 – 18 May 1838	Later Marquess of Ormonde
20 August 1821		John Brabazon, 10th Earl of Meath	9 April 1772 – 15 March 1851	Custos Rotulorum of County Wicklow
20 August 1821		Arthur Plunkett, 8th Earl of Fingall	9 September 1759 – 30 July 1836	First Catholic appointed
20 August 1821		James Stopford, 3rd Earl of Courtown	15 August 1765 – 15 June 1835	Captain of the Honourable Band of Gentlemen Pensioners
20 August 1821		Robert Jocelyn, 3rd Earl of Roden	27 October 1788 – 20 March 1870	Vice-Chamberlain of the Household
19 October 1831		Ulick de Burgh, 1st Marquess of Clanricarde	20 December 1802 – 10 April 1874	Captain of the Yeomen of the Guard
19 October 1831		Francis Caulfeild, 2nd Earl of Charlemont	3 January 1775 – 26 December 1863	
24 November 1831		Arthur Hill, 3rd Marquess of Downshire	8 October 1788 – 12 April 1845	Lord Lieutenant of Down
24 November 1831		Francis Mathew, 2nd Earl Landaff	20 January 1768 – 12 March 1833	
27 March 1833		Francis Conyngham, 2nd Marquess Conyngham	11 June 1797 – 17 July 1876	Former Master of the Robes
8 April 1834		Nathaniel Clements, 2nd Earl of Leitrim	9 May 1768 – 31 December 1854	Lord Lieutenant of Leitrim
8 April 1834		John Hely-Hutchinson, 3rd Earl of Donoughmore	1787 – 14 September 1851	Lord Lieutenant of Tipperary
22 July 1835		Edmund Boyle, 8th Earl of Cork	21 October 1767 – 30 June 1856	
22 July 1835		Thomas St Lawrence, 3rd Earl of Howth	16 August 1803 – 4 February 1874	
12 September 1837		Thomas Southwell, 3rd Viscount Southwell	25 February 1777 – 29 February 1860	
15 April 1839		Thomas Taylour, 2nd Marquess of Headfort	4 May 1787 – 6 December 1870	Lord-Lieutenant of County Cavan
29 April 1839		William Hare, 2nd Earl of Listowel	22 September 1801 – 3 February 1856	
13 March 1841		Joseph Leeson, 4th Earl of Milltown	11 February 1799 – 31 January 1866	
6 May 1841		Philip Gore, 4th Earl of Arran	23 November 1801 – 25 June 1884	
20 January 1842		Prince Albert of Saxe-Coburg-Gotha	26 August 1819 – 14 December 1861	
5 June 1842		William Howard, 4th Earl of Wicklow	13 February 1791 – 22 March 1869	Lord Lieutenant of Wicklow
4 January 1845		William Parsons, 3rd Earl of Rosse	17 June 1800 – 31 October 1867	Lord Lieutenant of King's County
4 January 1845		Henry Beresford, 3rd Marquess of Waterford	26 April 1811 – 29 March 1859	
17 September 1845		John FitzGibbon, 2nd Earl of Clare	10 July 1792 – 18 August 1851	
17 September 1845		John Butler, 2nd Marquess of Ormonde	24 August 1808 – 25 September 1854	
12 November 1845		Henry Maxwell, 7th Baron Farnham	9 August 1799 – 20 August 1868	
9 October 1846		Arthur Plunkett, 9th Earl of Fingall	29 March 1791 – 21 April 1869	
3 July 1851		John Skeffington, 10th Viscount Massereene	30 November 1812 – 28 April 1863	
17 November 1851		Prince George William Frederick Charles, Duke of Cambridge	26 March 1819 – 17 March 1904	
18 November 1851		Robert Carew, 1st Baron Carew	9 March 1787 – 2 June 1856	Lord Lieutenant of County Wexford
22 February 1855		Richard Dawson, 3rd Baron Cremorne	7 September 1817 – 11 May 1897	Later Earl of Dartrey
22 February 1855		Archibald Acheson, 3rd Earl of Gosford	20 August 1806 – 15 June 1864	
28 August 1856		Frederick Stewart, 4th Marquess of Londonderry	7 July 1805 – 25 November 1872	Lord Lieutenant of Down and former Vice-Chamberlain of the Household
30 January 1857		George Forbes, 7th Earl of Granard	5 August 1833 – 25 August 1889	Lord Lieutenant of Leitrim
30 January 1857		Hugh Gough, 1st Viscount Gough	3 November 1779 – 2 March 1869	Colonel of the Royal Regiment of Horse Guards (The Blues)
3 February 1857		George Chichester, 3rd Marquess of Donegall	10 February 1797 – 20 October 1883	Lord Lieutenant of Antrim and former Captain of the Yeomen of the Guard
24 May 1859		Arthur Hill, 4th Marquess of Downshire	6 August 1812 – 6 August 1868	
13 June 1860		Richard Boyle, 9th Earl of Cork	19 April 1829 – 22 June 1904	
28 January 1864		Frederick Hamilton-Temple-Blackwood, 5th Baron Dufferin and Claneboye	21 June 1826 – 12 February 1902	Later Marquess of Dufferin and Ava
31 March 1864		Charles Brownlow, 2nd Baron Lurgan	10 April 1831 – 15 January 1882	Lord Lieutenant of Armagh
28 December 1865		James Caulfeild, 3rd Earl of Charlemont	6 October 1820 – 12 January 1892	Lord Lieutenant of Tyrone
13 March 1866		Edwin Wyndham-Quin, 3rd Earl of Dunraven and Mount-Earl	19 May 1812 – 6 October 1871	Lord Lieutenant of Limerick
7 February 1868		Henry Moore, 3rd Marquess of Drogheda	14 August 1825 – 29 June 1892	
18 March 1868		Albert Edward, Prince of Wales	9 November 1841 – 6 May 1910	Later Edward VII, King of the United Kingdom
17 November 1868		John Beresford, 5th Marquess of Waterford	21 May 1844 – 23 October 1895	
17 November 1868		John Crichton, 3rd Earl Erne	30 July 1802 – 3 October 1885	Lord Lieutenant of Fermanagh
18 January 1869		Richard Bourke, 6th Earl of Mayo	21 February 1822 – 8 February 1872	Governor-General of India
30 March 1869		Prince Arthur William Patrick Albert	1 May 1850 – 16 January 1942	Later Duke of Connaught and Strathearn
2 June 1869		Granville Proby, 4th Earl of Carysfort	14 September 1824 – 18 May 1872	Former Comptroller of the Household
2 June 1869		Archibald Acheson, 4th Earl of Gosford	2 August 1841 – 11 April 1922	
2 August 1871		Mervyn Wingfield, 7th Viscount Powerscourt	13 October 1836 – 5 June 1904	
2 August 1871		Thomas Southwell, 4th Viscount Southwell	6 April 1836 – 26 April 1878	Lord Lieutenant of Leitrim
29 February 1872		Robert Carew, 2nd Baron Carew	28 January 1818 – 8 September 1881	Lord Lieutenant of Wexford
1 June 1872		Valentine Browne, 4th Earl of Kenmare	16 May 1825 – 9 February 1905	Lord Lieutenant of Kerry and former Comptroller of the Household
20 February 1873		William Hare, 3rd Earl of Listowel	29 May 1833 – 5 June 1924	
31 August 1874		William Proby, 5th Earl of Carysfort	18 January 1836 – 4 September 1909	
31 August 1874		George Vane-Tempest, 5th Marquess of Londonderry	26 April 1821 – 5 November 1884	
13 May 1876		Windham Wyndham-Quin, 4th Earl of Dunraven and Mount-Earl	12 February 1841 – 14 June 1926	
3 March 1877		William Montagu, 7th Duke of Manchester	15 October 1823 – 21 March 1890	
8 February 1879		Henry Dawson-Damer, 3rd Earl of Portarlington	5 September 1822 – 1 March 1889	
14 May 1880		Prince Alfred, Duke of Edinburgh	6 August 1844 – 30 July 1900	Later Duke of Saxe-Coburg-Gotha
17 January 1882		Thomas O'Hagan, 1st Baron O'Hagan	29 May 1812 – 1 February 1885	Former Lord Chancellor of Ireland
11 April 1882		Chichester Parkinson-Fortescue, 1st Baron Carlingford	18 January 1823 – 30 January 1898	Later Baron Clermont
8 May 1884		William St Lawrence, 4th Earl of Howth	1827–1909	
9 February 1885		Luke White, 2nd Baron Annaly	26 September 1829 – 17 March 1888	Former Lord Lieutenant of Longford
9 February 1885		Thomas Spring Rice, 2nd Baron Monteagle of Brandon	31 May 1849 – 24 December 1926	
28 November 1885		Garnet Wolseley, 1st Viscount Wolseley	4 June 1833 – 25 March 1913	Adjutant-General to the Forces
28 November 1885		Thomas Taylour, 3rd Marquess of Headfort	1 November 1822 – 22 July 1894	Lord Lieutenant of Meath
28 June 1887		Prince Albert Victor Christian Edward	8 January 1864 – 14 January 1892	Later Duke of Clarence and Avondale
26 April 1888		James Butler, 3rd Marquess of Ormonde	5 October 1844 – 26 October 1919	Lord Lieutenant of Kilkenny
4 April 1889		John Crichton, 4th Earl Erne	16 October 1839 – 2 December 1914	Lord Lieutenant of Fermanagh
7 February 1890		Edward Leeson, 6th Earl of Milltown	9 October 1835 – 30 May 1890	Lord Lieutenant of Wicklow
24 May 1890		Francis Needham, 3rd Earl of Kilmorey	2 August 1842 – 28 July 1915	
29 August 1890		Lawrence Parsons, 4th Earl of Rosse	17 November 1840 – 30 August 1908	Chancellor of the University of Dublin
18 December 1890		Prince William Augustus Edward of Saxe-Weimar	11 October 1823 – 16 November 1902	Colonel of the 1st Regiment of Life Guards
18 March 1892		William Pery, 3rd Earl of Limerick	17 January 1840 – 8 August 1896	Captain of the Yeomen of the Guard
5 August 1892		Edward O'Brien, 14th Baron Inchiquin	14 May 1839 – 8 April 1900	Lord Lieutenant of Clare
3 November 1894		Frederick Lambart, 9th Earl of Cavan	21 October 1839 – 14 July 1900	Former Vice-Chamberlain of the Household
25 February 1896		Edward Guinness, 1st Baron Iveagh	10 November 1847 – 7 October 1927	Later Earl of Iveagh
11 February 1897		James Alexander, 4th Earl of Caledon	11 July 1846 – 27 April 1898	
20 August 1897		Prince George Frederick Ernest Albert, Duke of York	3 June 1865 – 20 January 1936	Later George V, King of the United Kingdom
20 August 1897		Frederick Roberts, 1st Baron Roberts	30 September 1832 – 14 November 1914	Later Earl Roberts
15 March 1898		Arthur Gore, 5th Earl of Arran	6 January 1839 – 14 March 1901	Lord Lieutenant of Mayo
4 March 1899		Charles Bingham, 4th Earl of Lucan	8 May 1830 – 5 June 1914	
29 August 1900		James Bernard, 4th Earl of Bandon	12 September 1850 – 18 May 1924	Lord Lieutenant of Cork
29 August 1900		Luke Dillon, 4th Baron Clonbrock	10 March 1834 – 12 May 1917	Lord Lieutenant of Galway
10 June 1901		Thomas Pakenham, 5th Earl of Longford	19 October 1864 – 21 August 1915	Lord Lieutenant of Longford
15 March 1902		Henry Beresford, 6th Marquess of Waterford	28 April 1875 – 1 December 1911	
11 August 1902		Lowry Cole, 4th Earl of Enniskillen	21 December 1845 – 28 April 1924	
11 August 1902		Dudley FitzGerald-de Ros, 24th Baron de Ros	11 March 1827 – 29 April 1907	Colonel of the 1st Life Guards
3 February 1905		Dermot Bourke, 7th Earl of Mayo	2 July 1851 – 31 December 1927	
13 April 1905		Reginald Brabazon, 12th Earl of Meath	31 July 1841 – 11 October 1929	
29 February 1908		Bernard FitzPatrick, 2nd Baron Castletown	29 July 1849 – 29 May 1937	
5 February 1909		William James Pirrie, 1st Baron Pirrie	31 May 1847 – 6 June 1924	Later Viscount Pirrie
21 May 1909		Bernard Forbes, 8th Earl of Granard	17 September 1874 – 10 September 1948	Master of the Horse
13 December 1909		Arthur Gore, 6th Earl of Arran	14 September 1868 – 19 December 1958	
10 July 1911		Anthony Ashley-Cooper, 9th Earl of Shaftesbury	31 August 1869 – 25 March 1961	Lord Chamberlain to Queen Mary
10 July 1911		Horatio Kitchener, 1st Viscount Kitchener	24 June 1850 – 5 June 1916	Later Earl Kitchener
28 May 1915		Edward Ponsonby, 8th Earl of Bessborough	1 March 1851 – 1 December 1920	Chairman of the Board of Directors of the London, Brighton and South Coast Railway
18 April 1916		Richard Hely-Hutchinson, 6th Earl of Donoughmore	2 March 1875 – 19 October 1948	Grandmaster of the Grand Lodge of Ireland
18 April 1916		Mervyn Wingfield, 8th Viscount Powerscourt	16 July 1880 – 21 March 1947	Lord Lieutenant of Wicklow
18 April 1916		St John Brodrick, 1st Viscount Midleton	14 December 1856 – 13 February 1942	Later Earl of Midleton
18 November 1916		Rudolph Lambart, 10th Earl of Cavan	16 October 1865 – 28 August 1946	GOC Guards Division
4 June 1917		John French, 1st Viscount French	28 September 1852 – 22 May 1925	Later Earl of Ypres
3 June 1918		Geoffrey Browne, 3rd Baron Oranmore and Browne	6 January 1861 – 30 June 1927	
18 December 1919		Hamilton Cuffe, 5th Earl of Desart	30 August 1848 – 4 November 1934	Former Director of Public Prosecutions
21 June 1922		James Hamilton, 3rd Duke of Abercorn	30 November 1869 – 12 September 1953	Governor of Northern Ireland
3 June 1927		Edward, Prince of Wales	23 June 1894 – 28 May 1972	Later Edward VIII, King of the United Kingdom and, after his abdication, The Prince Edward, Duke of Windsor
29 June 1934		Prince Henry, Duke of Gloucester	31 March 1900 – 10 June 1974	Last surviving knight
17 March 1936		Prince Albert Frederick Arthur George, Duke of York	14 December 1895 – 6 February 1952	Later George VI, King of the United Kingdom
