= County Cork (Parliament of Ireland constituency) =

Pre-1801 Irish constituency

- Former county constituency for the Irish House of Commons
- County: County Cork

–1801
- Seats: 2
- Replaced by: County Cork (UKHC)

County Cork was a constituency represented in the Irish House of Commons until its abolition on 1 January 1801.

== Area ==
This constituency consisted of County Cork. It returned two members to the Parliament of Ireland up to 1800.

== History ==
In the Patriot Parliament of 1689 summoned by James II, County Cork was represented with two members. Following the Acts of Union 1800 the county retained two parliamentary seats in the United Kingdom House of Commons.

== Members of Parliament ==
- 1376: Richard de Wynchedoun and Philip, son of Robert White, were elected to come to England to consult with the king and council about the government of Ireland and about an aid for the king.
- 1420: John Mithe and Thomas Halle
- 1463: Robert Rochford, Esq. and Edward Penkeston, knight which also states that 'no knights were returned for a long time from thence'
- 1585: April. Sir John Norreys, knt. William Cogan, Esq. John Fitzgerald, Esq., of Cloyne.
- 1613: 19 April. Dermod McCarthy, Esq., of Lohort. Andrew Barrett, Esq., of Ballincollig.
- 1634: 23 June. Sir William St. Leger, knt., of Doneraile. Sir Donagh McCarthy, knt.
- 1639: 2 March. Sir William St Leger, knt., of Doneraile. Donagh McCarthy, knt.
- 1641: 20 February. Redmond Roche (MP) in place of Donagh McCarthy, who succeeded his father as 2nd Viscount of Muskerry.
- 1641: 22 June. Redmond Roche, of Cahirduggan, expelled for siding with the 1641 Rebellion.
- 1642: 2 July. ? in place of William St Leger who died.
- 1661: 25 April. Hon. Richard Boyle. Sir Henry Tynte, knt., of Roxhall.
- 1661: 2 June. Sir John Perceval, 1st Baronet of Burton, in place of Tynte, deceased.
- 1665: 7 December. Roger Boyle, in place of Richard Boyle, translated to the Lords.
- 1665-1666: John St Ledger (d.31 March 1696).

=== 1689–1801 ===
Election	First MP	Second MP	
1689	Justin McCarthy	Sir Richard Nagle	
1692	Sir St John Brodrick	Henry Boyle	
1695	Sir St John Brodrick	Thomas Brodrick	Whig
1703	Sir John Perceval, 5th Bt	Thomas Brodrick	Whig
1713	Sir John Perceval, 5th Bt	Alan Brodrick	Whig
1715	Henry Boyle	St John Brodrick	
1728	Henry Boyle	Sir Matthew Deane, 3rd Bt	
1747	Henry Boyle	Arthur Hyde	
1756	Viscount Dungarvan	Arthur Hyde	
1759	Richard Townsend	Arthur Hyde	
1761	Richard Townsend	Viscount Boyle	
1765	Richard Townsend	Hon. John Lysaght	
1768	Richard Townsend	John Hyde	
1776	Richard Townsend	Sir Robert Deane, 6th Bt	
1781	Richard Townsend	James Bernard	
1783	Viscount Kingsborough	James Bernard	
1791	Viscount Kingsborough	Abraham Morris	
1797	Viscount Kingsborough	Viscount Boyle	
1798	Robert Uniacke Fitzgerald	Viscount Boyle	
1801	Succeeded by the Westminster constituency County Cork		

== Bibliography ==
- McGrath, Brid (1997). "Redmond Roche Cork County". A Biographical Dictionary of the Membership of the Irish House of Commons 1640 to 1641 (Thesis). Vol. 1. Dublin: Trinity College. pp. 257–258. hdl:2262/77206. – Parliaments & Biographies (PDF downloaded from given URL)
- O'Hart, John (2007). The Irish and Anglo-Irish Landed Gentry: When Cromwell came to Ireland. Vol. 2. Heritage Books. ISBN 978-0-7884-1927-0.
- Johnston-Liik, E. M. (2002). History of the Irish Parliament, 1692–1800, Publisher: Ulster Historical Foundation (28 Feb 2002), ISBN 1-903688-09-4
- T. W. Moody, F. X. Martin, F. J. Byrne, A New History of Ireland 1534-1691, Oxford University Press, 1978
- Tim Cadogan and Jeremiah Falvey, A Biographical Dictionary of Cork, 2006, Four Courts Press ISBN 1-84682-030-8
- Leigh Rayment's historical List of Members of the Irish House of Commons. Cites: Johnston-Liik, Edith Mary (2002). The History of the Irish Parliament 1692-1800 (6 volumes). Ulster Historical Foundation.
- Clarke, Maude V. (1932–34). "William of Windsor in Ireland, 1369-1376". Proceedings of the Royal Irish Academy: Archaeology, Culture, History, Literature. 41: 55–130. JSTOR 25515963.
- Richardson, Henry Gerald; Sayles, George Osborne (1947). Parliaments And Councils Of Mediaeval Ireland (PDF). Vol. 1. Dublin: Stationery Office. p. xxx (38/308).
