= Reginald Cox =

British banker

Sir Reginald Cox Bt DL
- Born: Reginald Henry Cox; 30 December 1865; Westminster, London, England
- Died: 27 March 1922 (aged 56)
- Occupation: Banker

Sir Reginald Henry Cox, 1st Baronet, DL (30 December 1865 – 27 March 1922) was an English banker.

Cox was born in Westminster, the second son of Frederick Cox, DL JP of Hillingdon House and Mabel Eden. He was educated at Eton. He was a Senior Partner at Cox & Co. and an agent for the British Army. He was created a baronet of Old Windsor in the County of Berkshire in the 1921 New Year's Honours.

He lived in Old Windsor, Berkshire, and was appointed a deputy lieutenant and selected High Sheriff of Berkshire for 1919–20.

In 1890, he married Sybil Weguelin, daughter of MP Thomas Matthias Weguelin. He died at the age of 56 without surviving children, and the baronetcy thus became extinct after only just over a year.

Honorary titles
Preceded by Sir Clarendon Golding Hyde	High Sheriff of Berkshire; 1919–1920	Succeeded by Sir William Watson
Baronetage of the United Kingdom
New creation	Baronet (of Old Windsor); 1921–1922	Extinct
