= Henry Gervais =

Irish priest of the Anglican Church

Henry Gervais (19 March 1712 – 6 March 1790) was an Anglican priest in Ireland during the 18th century.

He was born in Lismore and educated at Trinity College, Dublin. He was Prebendary of Tullaghorton in Lismore Cathedral from 1754 until his death; Treasurer of Cashel Cathedral from 1768 to 1772; and Archdeacon of Cashel from 1772 until his death.
