= Daniel Hearne =

Daniel Hearne was an Anglican priest in Ireland during the mid-18th century.

Hearne educated at Trinity College, Dublin. He was Archdeacon of Cashel from 1728 until his death in November 1766.
