= Sir Richard Cox, 2nd Baronet =

Sir Richard Cox, 2nd Baronet (1702–1766) was an Irish baronet.

He was born on 23 November 1702, the grandson of lawyer and judge, Sir Richard Cox, 1st Baronet; and matriculated at St John's College, Oxford in 1720. He was Sheriff of Cork City in 1742. Sir Richard Cox (1702–1766) was the son of Richard Cox (1677–1725) and Susanna French, (died 1716). He married Catherine, daughter of George Evans. The son of Sir Richard Cox (1702–1766) was Sir Michael Cox, 3rd Baronet who was Archdeacon of Cashel from 1767 to 1772.

Baronetage of Ireland
Preceded by Richard Cox	Baronet (of Castletown); 1733–1766	Succeeded by Michael Cox
