= HMS Warspite (1807) =

Ship, 1807

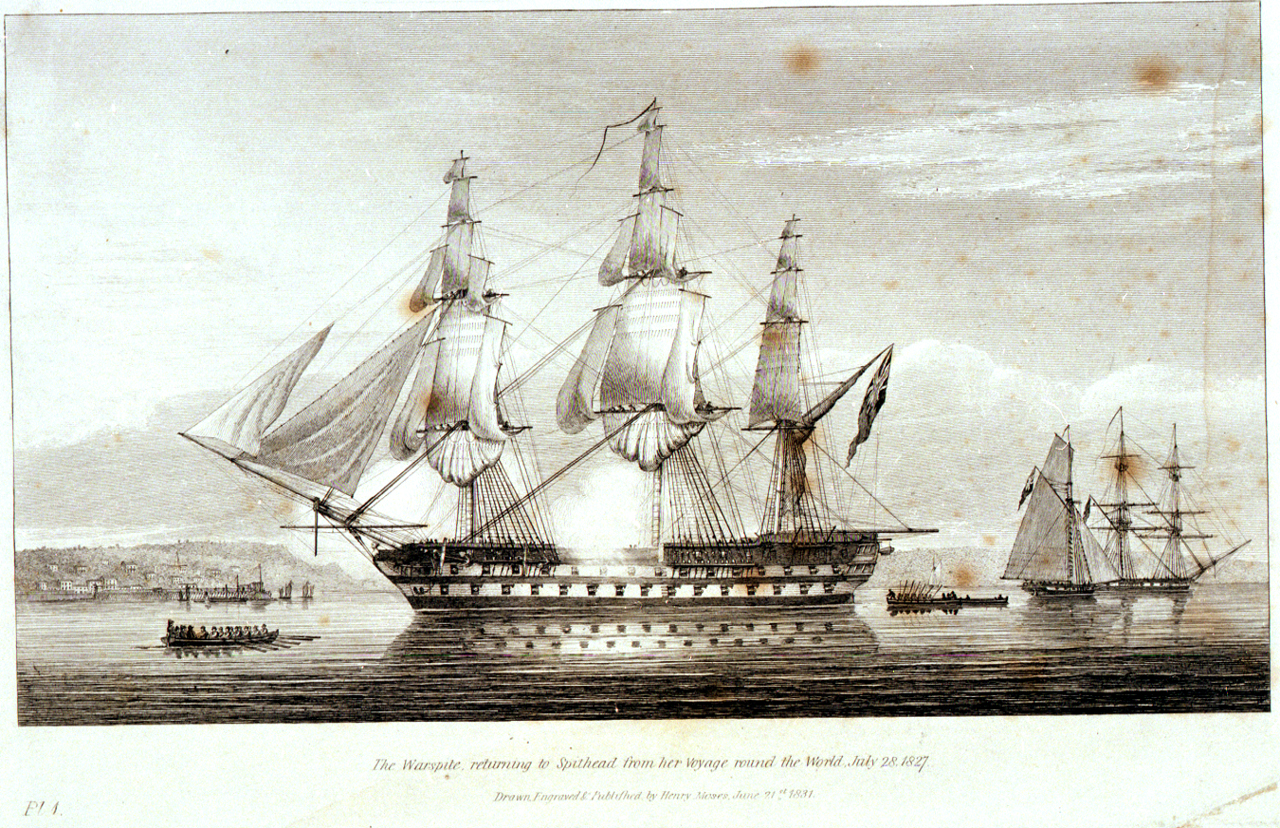
- The Warspite returning to Spithead from her voyage round the World, 28 July 1827

History

United Kingdom
- Name: HMS Warspite
- Ordered: 13 January 1798
- Builder: Chatham Dockyard
- Laid down: 3 December 1805
- Launched: 16 November 1807
- Decommissioned: 1815
- Notes: original construction cost £59,725
- Recommissioned: As a 76-gun ship, 1817
- Recommissioned: As a 50-gun frigate, 1840
- Decommissioned: 1846
- Reclassified: Boys' training ship, 1862
- Fate: Burnt, 3 January 1876

General characteristics as built
- Class & type: 74-gun third-rate ship of the line
- Tons burthen: 1890 bm
- Length: 179 ft 10 in (54.8 m) (gundeck)
- Beam: 49 ft (14.9 m)
- Draught: Underside of keel to uppermost point of taffrail 16.5m
- Depth of hold: 21 ft (6.4 m)
- Sail plan: Full-rigged ship
- Complement: 600
- Armament: 74 guns: Gundeck: 28 × 32-pdr guns; Upper gundeck: 30 × 24-pdr guns; Quarterdeck: 12 × 9-pdr guns; Forecastle: 4 × 9-pdr guns
- Notes: One of the earliest to be refitted with diagonal framing trusses

General characteristics 1840 razee
- Class & type: 50-gun frigate
- Length: 179 ft 10 in (54.8 m) (gundeck)
- Beam: 49 ft (14.9 m)
- Depth of hold: 13 ft 10 in (4.2 m)
- Sail plan: Full-rigged ship
- Complement: 475
- Armament: 50 guns: Upperdeck: 28 × 32-pdr guns; Quarterdeck: 16 × 32-pdr guns; Forecastle: 6 × 32-pdr guns

HMS Warspite was a 74-gun third-rate ship of the line of the Royal Navy, launched in 1807. She served in the Napoleonic Wars and was decommissioned in 1815. She was re-rated as a 76-gun ship in 1817 and then circumnavigated the world from 1826 to 1827, visiting Australia. She was cut down to a single decker 50-gun frigate in 1840 and was decommissioned in 1846. She was lent as a boys' training ship to the Marine Society and was lost to fire in 1876.

== Design and construction ==
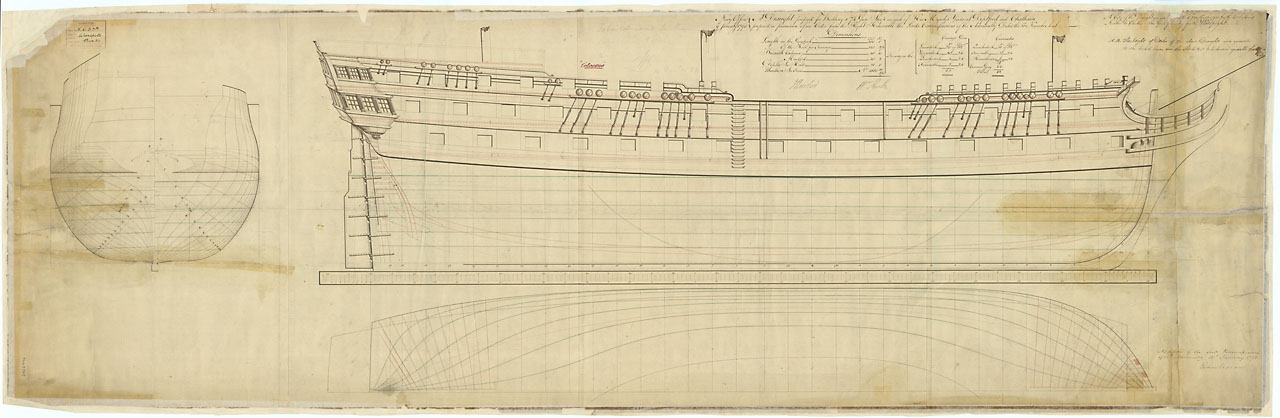
Warspite (1807)

After a long delay due to shortage of timber, Warspite was launched on 16 November 1807 at Chatham and commissioned by Sir Henry Blackwood, Admiral Lord Nelson's 'favourite frigate captain'. She was designed by Sir John Henslow as one of the large class 74s, and was the second, and last, ship of a class of two (the other being Colossus). As a large '74', she carried 24-pounder guns on her upper gun deck instead of the 18 pdrs found on the middling and common class 74s.

== Napoleonic Wars ==
Warspite spent three years between 1807 and 1810 playing a supporting role in the Peninsular War. She took part in the long blockade of Toulon in 1810. She then joined the Channel Fleet, protecting British trade while intercepting French and American ships. During early 1813 Warspite took a couple of lucrative ‘prizes’ including a US schooner bound for Philadelphia ‘with brandy, wine, silks, etc.,’ from France. In June 1814 her name appears for the first time on the North American and West Indies Station, when she carried reinforcements to Quebec; the first 74-gun ship to go so far up the Saint Lawrence River, under Captain Lord James O'Brien.

== 76-gun ship of the line ==
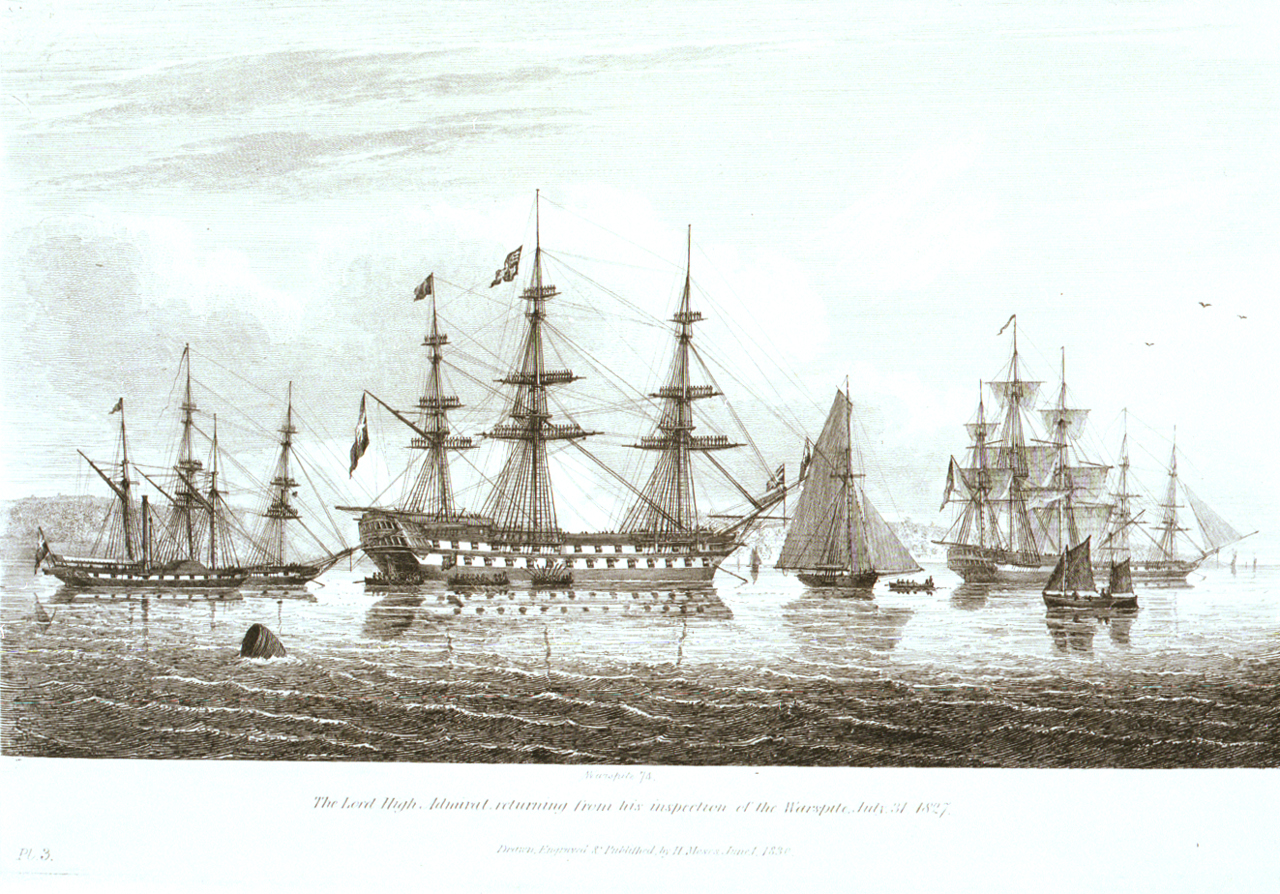
The Lord High Admiral returning from his inspection of the Warspite on 31 July 1827 by Henry Moses

She was paid off in 1815 only to be recommissioned in 1817 when she was modified to carry 76 guns. At the same time her stern was altered and she was given diagonal bracing on the framing introduced by Sir Robert Seppings. In 1825 she sailed from Portsmouth with Rear Admiral Philip Woodehouse as the new commanding officer of the West Indies station. During 1826–27 she circumnavigated the world under Captain William Parker, but bearing the flag of Rear-Admiral Gage, departing from Spithead for India. At Trincomalee Rear-Admiral Gage was replaced by Commodore Sir James Brisbane as the new South Atlantic (Rio de Janeiro) Station commander-in-chief. However, following Commodore Brisbane's death from a contracted tropical disease, Captain Richard Saunders Dundas of the accompanying sixth-rate survey ship HMS Volage took command for the rest of the voyage which saw Warspite as the first ship of the line to visit Port Jackson in the colony of New South Wales in Australia. Returning to the station with the Malta squadron late in 1828 she was detached to transport Count Capo d'Istria, President of the Greek republic, to various locations around the Eastern Mediterranean while blockading Navarino, Modon and Coron in coordination with the French and Russian allied squadrons. In this capacity it helped to interdict two Egyptian corvettes at Navarino, one suffering substantial damage when it ignored warning shots and was engaged with the main battery. Captain Parker then participated in several conferences with Ibrahim Pasha to negotiate the withdrawal of Egyptian troops from Greece. In 1831 she was at the South American (Rio de Janeiro) station as the flagship of Rear Admiral Sir Thomas Baker, Captain Charles Talbot, at one time contribution towards salvage of HMS Thetis cargo off Cape Frio in 1830.

== 50-gun frigate (1840–46) ==
Warspite was reduced to a one-decker 50-gun frigate in 1840, for service on the Home station under Lord John Hay, and is recorded to have visited the United States in 1842, exchanging salutes with USS North Carolina and the frigate Columbia in the New York harbor. She was then used for anti-piracy patrols in the Mediterranean, including the blockade of the mouth of the river Xanthus in 1844. Her last senior officer was Captain Wallis, serving at the Gibraltar station before she was paid off in 1846.

== Training ship (1862–79) ==
In 1862 she was loaned to The Marine Society as a boys' training ship, for which she was permanently moored on the Thames between Woolwich and Charlton. Training for about 150 boys at a time was conducted over about 10 months to provide basic seaman knowledge, including of ship lore, rigging and discipline, sufficient to be employed as Boy Seaman in either the Royal Navy or the merchant marine. On 6 August 1863 she was struck by the Russian ironclad Pervenets while the latter was undergoing sea trials.

== Fate ==
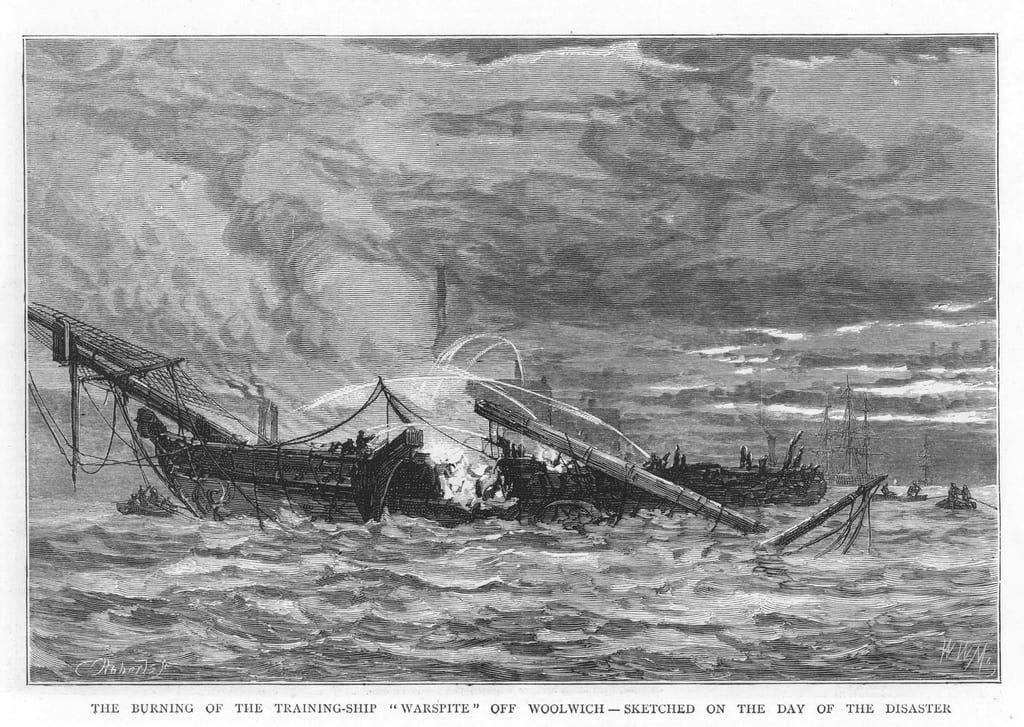
The burning of the Training-Ship 'Warspite' off Woolwich, sketched [by Walter William May] on the Day of the Disaster - from an 1876 issue of The Graphic.

She was destroyed by fire (arson was suspected but never proven) on 3 January 1876, while still on loan. Of the 458 people on board, only three or four were drowned. The wreck was sold to McArthur and Co on 2 February 1876.
