= Richard Boyle, 2nd Earl of Shannon =

Irish peer and Member of Parliament

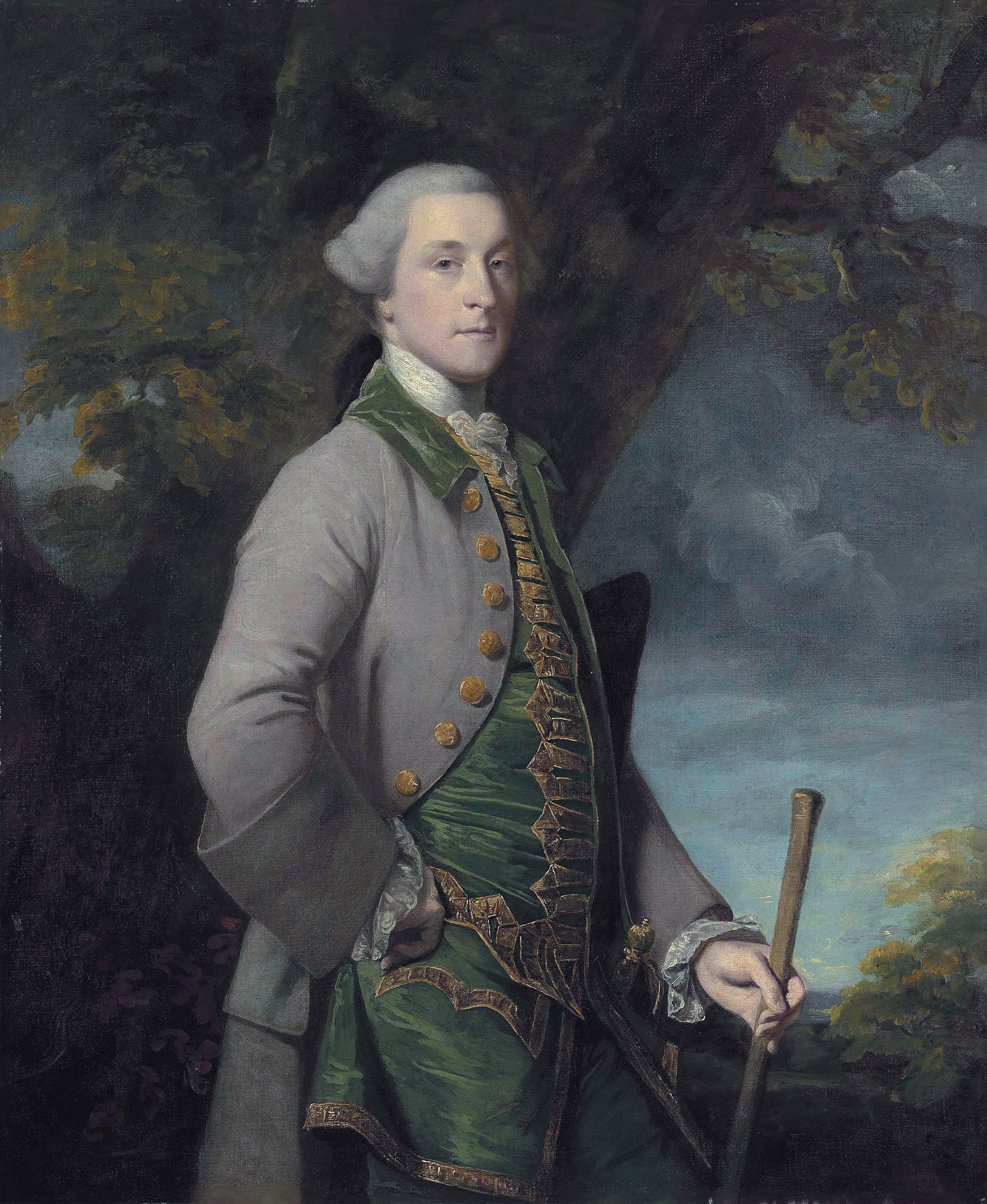
Richard Boyle, 2nd Earl of Shannon (1727–1807) (Joshua Reynolds, 1759 or later)

Richard Boyle, 2nd Earl of Shannon KP, PC (Ire) (30 January 1727 – 20 May 1807), was an Irish peer and Member of Parliament. He represented Dungarvan and County Cork, and succeeded his father as Earl of Shannon.

== Family ==
He was the elder surviving son of Henry Boyle, 1st Earl of Shannon, and his second wife, Lady Henrietta Boyle (1700–1746). His maternal grandparents were Charles Boyle, 2nd Earl of Burlington, and Juliana Noel.

== Career ==
Boyle was educated at Trinity College Dublin. In 1749, he entered the Irish House of Commons, representing Dungarvan until 1761. He was then elected for Clonakilty as well as County Cork and sat for the latter constituency until 1764 when he succeeded his father in the titles. According to the "Blackwell Companion to Modern Irish Culture" (1998) by William John McCormack and Patrick Gillan, Richard "did not possess the political talent which had enabled his father to dominate the Irish House of Commons for so long."

He served in the Privy Council of Ireland from 1763 to 1770. In 1766, Shannon was commissioned Master-General of the Ordnance of the Kingdom of Ireland. He resigned his post in 1770. In 1774, Shannon was again appointed Privy Councilor, serving to 1789. The same year he was appointed Muster-Master-General of the royal military forces in the Kingdom of Ireland. He maintained his position to 1781. That year he became Joint Vice-Treasurer of Ireland, an office held in commission with other politicians to 1789. In the later office Shannon served under William Cavendish, 5th Duke of Devonshire, the active Lord High Treasurer of Ireland.

In 1783, Shannon was among the Founders of the Knights of St Patrick. In 1786, Shannon was created Baron Carleton in the Peerage of Great Britain. The title would keep being inherited by later Earls of Shannon. According to the "Blackwell Companion" this was a reward for political services to King George III. Shannon "remained a force in domestic politics" and supported the governments of Dublin Castle. In other words, Shannon actively supported the continued British rule in Ireland throughout the 1770s and 1780s. At the time the Irish Volunteers, the local Irish militia, played a part in both military and political matters of the island. The Constitution of 1782 also increased the legislative freedom of the Irish Parliament. British administration relied in part to their continued support.

In 1789, Shannon retired from all his political offices. The "Blackwell Companion" considers this a direct result of the Regency crisis of 1788. In the summer of 1788 the mental health of George III deteriorated, but he was nonetheless able to discharge some of his duties and to declare British Parliament prorogued from 25 September to 20 November. During the prorogation George III became deranged, posing a threat to his own life, and when Parliament reconvened in November the King could not deliver the customary Speech from the Throne during the State Opening of Parliament. Parliament found itself in an untenable position; according to long-established law, it could not proceed to any business until the delivery of the King's Speech at a State Opening. The administration of William Pitt the Younger, Prime Minister of Great Britain, outlined formal plans for installing a Regency. However, their authority to do so was questionable. Shannon "broke with the administration" during the Crisis.

The "Blackwell Companion" notes that he was back in the political fold by the middle of the 1790s, continuing to support the governments of Dublin Castle. In 1793, he was appointed a Privy Councilor for the third and final time. He served to his death in 1807. Also in 1793, Shannon was appointed First Lord of the Treasury for the Kingdom of Ireland. The "Companion" notes his strong support of the Act of Union 1800 which created the United Kingdom of Great Britain and Ireland. The authors point that the Act would result in "the abolition of his parliamentary base".

His letters to his son, Henry, dating in large part to the 1798 period, were published in 1982.

== Marriage and children ==
On 15 December 1763, Richard married Catherine Ponsonby. Her parents were John Ponsonby, Speaker of the Irish House of Commons from 1756 to 1771, and his wife Lady Elizabeth Cavendish. Lady Elizabeth was a daughter of William Cavendish, 3rd Duke of Devonshire, and his wife Catherine Hoskins. Her maternal grandparents were John Hoskins and Catherine Hale.

Richard and Catherine had two children:

- Catherine Henrietta Boyle (12 January 1768 – 8 July 1815). Married Francis Bernard, 1st Earl of Bandon.
- Henry Boyle, 3rd Earl of Shannon (8 August 1771 – 22 April 1842).

Parliament of Ireland
Preceded by Robert Roberts	Member of Parliament for Dungarvan; 1749–1761; With: Robert Roberts 1749–1758; Robert Boyle-Walsingham 1758–1761	Succeeded by Robert Boyle-Walsingham; Thomas Carew
Preceded by Arthur Hyde; Richard Townsend	Member of Parliament for County Cork; 1761–1764; With: Richard Townsend	Succeeded by Hon. John Lysaght; Richard Townsend
Preceded by Francis Bernard; Sir Richard Cox, Bt	Member of Parliament for Clonakilty; 1761; With: Sir Richard Cox, Bt	Succeeded by Henry Sheares; Sir Richard Cox, Bt
Peerage of Ireland
Preceded by Henry Boyle	Earl of Shannon; 1764–1807	Succeeded by Henry Boyle
Preceded by Henry Boyle	Viscount Boyle; 1764–1807	Succeeded by Henry Boyle
Preceded by Henry Boyle	Baron Castle Martyr; 1764–1807	Succeeded by Henry Boyle
Peerage of Great Britain
New creation	Baron Carleton; 1786–1807; Member of the House of Lords (1786–1807)	Succeeded by Henry Boyle
