= Nicholas Proude =

Nicholas Proude was a Church of Ireland priest in Ireland during the seventeenth century.

Proude was educated at St John's College, Cambridge. He graduated BA in 1629 and MA in 1632. He held livings at Ballysheehan, Killenaule and Ballingarry He was appointed Archdeacon of Cashel in 1640 and Dean of Clonfert in 1666; and held both offices until his death in 1669.
