= James O'Brien, 3rd Marquess of Thomond =

Royal Navy Admiral and Chief of Clan O'Brien (1769–1855)

Admiral The Most Honourable The Marquess of Thomond GCH
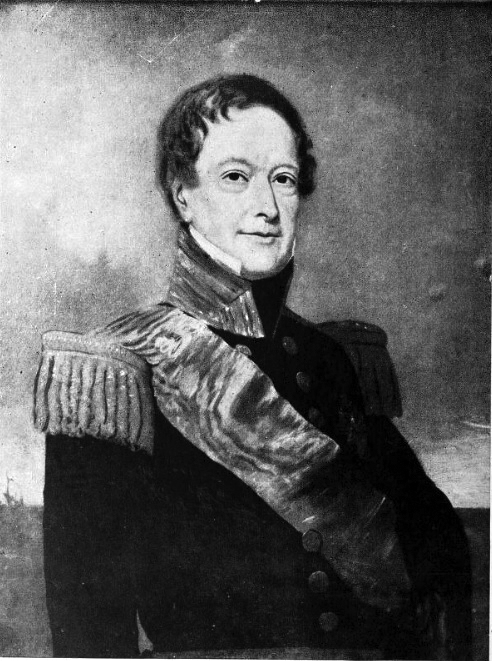
- Born: 1769
- Died: 3 July 1855 (aged 85–86); Bath, Somerset
- Burial place: St. Saviour's Church, Walcot, Bath
- Relatives: Murrough O'Brien, 1st Marquess of Thomond; William O'Brien, 2nd Marquess of Thomond
- Military career
- Allegiance: Great Britain
- Branch: Royal Navy
- Rank: Admiral
- Commands: HMS Childers; HMS Thisbe; HMS Emerald; HMS Diadem; HMS Warspite
- Conflicts: American Revolutionary War; French Revolutionary War; Cornwallis's Retreat; Napoleonic Wars; Battle of Suriname
- Awards: Knight Grand Cross of the Royal Guelphic Order

Admiral James O'Brien, 3rd Marquess of Thomond, GCH (1769–1855), styled Lord James O'Brien from 1809 to 1846, was a British naval officer and Chief of Clan O'Brien.

O'Brien, born in 1769, was third son of Edward Dominic O'Brien, captain in the army (d. 1801). His mother was Mary Carrick, and his uncle, Murrough O'Brien, was first Marquess of Thomond. He inherited his title on the death of his brother William O'Brien, 2nd Marquess of Thomond.

== Naval career ==
As a captain's servant, he entered the navy on 17 April 1783 on board HMS Hebe, stationed in the Channel. From 1786 to 1789 he was a midshipman in the 74-gun Pegasus and the 32-gun HMS Andromeda frigate, both commanded by the Duke of Clarence, under whom he also served with the Channel fleet in HMS Valiant in 1790. As a lieutenant he joined, in succession, on the home station, second-rate HMS London, the 38-gun fifth-rate HMS Artois, and the 74-gun HMS Brunswick. In the latter ship he was present in William Cornwallis' celebrated retreat, 16 and 17 June 1795. On 5 December 1796 he was promoted to the command of the 14-gun sloop HMS Childers. From 1800 to 1804 he commanded Emerald on the West Indies station, where, on 24 June 1803, he made a prize of L'Enfant Prodigue, a French national schooner of sixteen guns, and in the spring of 1804 distinguished himself in forwarding the supplies at the capture of Surinam, as well as by defeating a projected expedition by the enemy against Antigua.

On 29 November 1809 he was granted a Royal Warrant of Precedence as if his father had succeeded to the marquisate of Thomond, and was henceforth known as Lord James O'Brien. From September 1813 until November 1815, he served in the English Channel in HMS Warspite. He became a rear-admiral in 1825, a vice-admiral in 1837, a full admiral on 13 May 1847, and an Admiral of the Red in 1853. On the accession of William IV, he was made a lord of the bedchamber, and nominated G.C.H. on 13 May 1831. He succeeded his brother, William O'Brien, on 21 August 1846 as the third Marquess of Thomond.

== Retirement ==
He retired to Bath where he became an important figure in local society. Amongst other appointments he was Chairman of the Ball Committee, Chairman of the Trustees of Bath Savings Bank, a member of the prestigious York Club and a Steward of the Club's Annual Ball.

He died at his residence in Bath (20 Royal Crescent) on 3 July 1855, and was buried in the catacombs of St. Saviour's Church, Walcot, Bath, on 10 July.

== Family ==
He married, first, on 25 November 1800, Eliza Bridgman, second daughter of James Willyams of Carnanton, Cornwall (she died on 14 February 1802); secondly, in 1806, while in the West Indies, Jane, daughter of Thomas Ottley, and widow of Valentine Horne Horsford of Antigua (she died on 8 September 1843); and, thirdly, on 5 January 1847, at Bath, Anne, sister of Sir C. W. Flint, and widow of Rear-Admiral Francis William Fane.

O'Brien left no issue, and the marquessate of Thomond and the earldom of Inchiquin became extinct, but the barony of Inchiquin devolved to the heir male, Sir Lucius O'Brien, Bt, who became thirteenth Baron Inchiquin on 3 July 1855.

== See also ==
- O'Byrne, William Richard (1849). "Thomond, James" . A Naval Biographical Dictionary . John Murray – via Wikisource.

Peerage of Ireland
Preceded by William O'Brien	Marquess of Thomond; 1846–1855	Extinct
Preceded by William O'Brien	Earl of Inchiquin; 1846–1855	Extinct
Preceded by William O'Brien	Baron Inchiquin; 1846–1855	Succeeded by Lucius O'Brien
