= Thomas Wilson (archdeacon of Cashel) =

Thomas Wilson was an Irish Anglican clergyman, Chancellor of the Diocese of Cashel from 1608 until 1615 and Archdeacon of Cashel from 1615 until 1616.
