= Bellingham Boyle =

Irish politician

Bellingham Boyle (1709–1771) was an Irish politician.

Boyle was educated at Trinity College, Dublin. From 1731 until 1761, he was MP for Bandonbridge; and from 1761 to 1768 for Youghal.
