= Abraham Morris =

Irish banker (1752–1822)

Abraham Morris (1752 – 13 February 1822) was an Irish banker.

He sat in the Irish House of Commons for County Cork from 1791 to 1797. Morris's father, also named Abraham, was involved in a feud with Art Ó Laoghaire, and ordered Ó Laoghaire's death in 1773. The Irish lament Caoineadh Airt Uí Laoghaire, was composed by Ó Laoghaire's widow Eibhlín Dubh Ní Chonaill about his murder.
