= William O'Brien, 2nd Marquess of Thomond =

Irish peer, also titled Baron Tadcaster

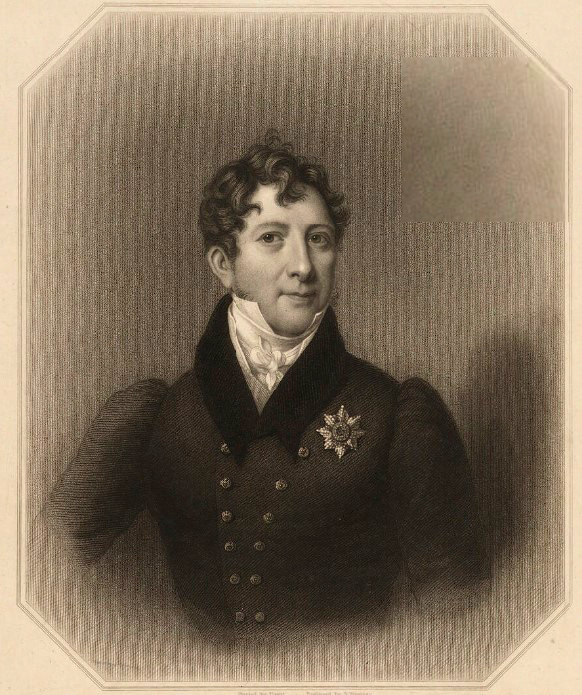
William O'Brien, 2nd Marquess of Thomond, 6th Earl of Inchiquin

William O'Brien, 2nd Marquess of Thomond KP PC (I) (1765 – 21 August 1846) was an Irish peer and Chief of Clan O'Brien. He succeeded by special remainder as Marquess of Thomond in 1808 on the death of his uncle Murrough O'Brien, 1st Marquess of Thomond and was appointed a Privy Councillor and Knight of the Order of St Patrick on 11 November 1809. He was created Baron Tadcaster in the British Peerage in 1826. He was also Colonel of the disembodied Royal Cork City Militia in 1840.

== Early life ==
O'Brien was born in Ennistymon, County Clare, to Captain Edward Dominic O'Brien, High Sheriff of Clare and Mary Carrick, daughter of Christopher Carrick and Áine McNally. His father was the grandson of William O'Brien, 3rd Earl of Inchiquin.

== Death and succession ==
On his death in 1846 his title passed by the same special remainder to his brother James O'Brien, 3rd Marquess of Thomond.

== Family ==
William O'Brien married Elizabeth Rebecca Trotter (1775–1852), daughter of Thomas Trotter of Duleek, Co. Meath on 16 September 1799. They had no son but four daughters:

- Susan Maria married Captain later Rear-Admiral George Frederick Hotham RN and they were parents of Charles 4th Lord Hotham
- Sarah married Major William Stanhope Taylor
- Mary married Richard White, Viscount Berehaven who succeeded as 2nd Earl of Bantry
- Elizabeth married George Stucley Bucke who in 1859 was made Sir George Stucley Stucley, 1st Baronet

Peerage of Ireland
| Preceded by Murrough O'Brien | Marquess of Thomond; 1808–1846 | Succeeded by James O'Brien |
Peerage of the United Kingdom
| New creation | Baron Tadcaster; 1826–1846 | Extinct |
Political offices
| Preceded by The Lord Callan | Representative peer for Ireland; 1816–1846 | Succeeded by The Earl of Desart |
