= Youghal (Parliament of Ireland constituency) =

Pre-1801 Irish constituency

- Former borough constituency for the Irish House of Commons
- County: County Cork
- Borough: Youghal

1374–1801
- Seats: 2
- Replaced by: Youghal (UKHC)

Youghal was a parliamentary borough represented in the Irish House of Commons until its abolition on 1 January 1801. It was a corporation with burgesses and freemen.

== History ==
In 1700 the borough was under the patronage of Charles Boyle, 2nd Earl of Burlington. It passed through his granddaughter Charlotte Cavendish, Marchioness of Hartington to her husband William Cavendish, later Duke of Devonshire, who by 1758 had entrusted it to Henry Boyle, 1st Earl of Shannon. Following the Acts of Union 1800 the borough sent one MP to Westminster, still under the patronage of the Earls of Shannon.

A Topographical Directory of Ireland, published in 1837, describes the parliamentary history of the borough of Youghal in County Cork:

The borough appears to have exercised the elective franchise by prescription, as, though no notice of that privilege appears in any of its charters, it continued to send two members to the Irish parliament from the year 1374 till the Union, since which period it has returned one member to the imperial parliament; the right of election was vested solely in the members of the corporation and the freemen, whether resident or not; but by the act of the 2nd of Wm. IV., cap. 88, it has been granted to the £10 householders, and the non-resident freemen have been disfranchised. A new boundary has been drawn round the town, including an area of 212 statute acres.

== Members of Parliament 1559–1801 ==
- 1376: Bernard Baret and Richard Cristofre were elected to come to England to consult with the king and council about the government of Ireland and about an aid for the king.

Election	First MP	Second MP
1559	John Walch	John Portyngall
1585	Thomas Coppinger	James Collen
1613	Edmund Coppinger	John Forrest
1634	Edward Gough	Theobald Ronayne
1661	Sir Boyle Maynard	Owen Silver
1689	Thomas Uniack	Edward Gough
1692	Henry Boyle	Robert FitzGerald
1695	Henry Boyle	Robert FitzGerald
1703	Henry Luther	John Hayman
1713	Henry Luther	Boyle Smyth
1715	Francis Palmes	Arthur Hyde
1719	Henry Rugge	Arthur Hyde
October 1721	Henry Rugge	Richard FitzPatrick
1721	Henry Rugge	Arthur Hyde
1727	James Tynte	James O'Brien
1758	Arthur Hyde	James O'Brien
1761	Sir John Colthurst, 1st Bt	Bellingham Boyle
1768	James Dennis	Joseph Lysaght
1776	James Dennis	James Uniacke
1777	Robert Uniacke	James Uniacke
1798	Robert Uniacke	John Keane
1801	Succeeded by Westminster constituency of Youghal	

== Elections ==
1613 June 7
Edmund Coppinger 62 votes; John Forrest 53; Thomas Ronayne 12; Henry Gosnold 6.
1628 October 9
William Bluet and Edward Gough returned.
1634 June/July
Edward Gough 59; Theobald Ronane 41; Edward Stoute 21; Christmas Harford 5.
1639 February 25
Edward Gough 51; Theobald Ronaine 44; William Gough (son of Richard) 21; Nicholas Forest 10.
1695
1703
1713
1715
1719 July 20
(by-election on the death of Francis Palmes) Henry Rugge 88 votes; Sir John Osberne, baronet, 60.
1727
1761
1768
1776
1783
1790
1797
1800 January
Robert Uniacke re-elected after appointment as Master General of the Ordnance of Ireland.
