= Robert Uniacke Fitzgerald =

Irish politician

Col Robert Uniacke-Fitzgerald MP Cork (17 March 1751 – 20 December 1814)

Colonel Robert Uniacke-FitzGerald (17 March 1751 – 20 December 1814) was an Irish politician.

He was the eldest son of Robert Uniacke (afterwards Fitzgerald) of Corkbeg and descended from the Munster Desmond FitzGerald Knights of Glin and Kerry, through Sir Garrett FitzGerald Knt of Lisquinlan and Sir Robert Tynte of Youghal and Ballycrenane. His younger brother was the infamous 1798 United Irish Rebellion Tipperary High Sheriff Col Sir Thomas Judkin-Fitzgerald, 1st Baronet of Lisheen, Co Tipperary. He was educated in the law at the Middle Temple.

Uniacke-FitzGerald was among the last surviving Members of the Parliament of Ireland, where he represented County Cork with his cousin Henry Boyle, 3rd Earl of Shannon from 1798 until its extinction in 1800. He was appointed Clerk of the Ordnance in 1799, and Surveyor-General in 1801.

After the Act of Union in 1801 he represented County Cork in the new Parliament of the United Kingdom until 24 October 1806. He was Colonel of the North Cork Militia from 1798 to 1807 and Governor of Cork in 1805.

He married Louisa, the daughter of Rev. Richard Bullen of Rostellan, co. Cork, with whom he had a son and ten daughters. His descendants included Sir Robert Uniacke-Penrose-Fitzgerald, 1st Baronet of Corkbeg and Lisquinlan.

== Ancestry ==
Ancestors of Robert Uniacke Fitzgerald

16. Maurice Uniacke of Youghal, Co Cork
8. Thomas Uniacke
4. Thomas Uniacke
18. Sir Garrett FitzGerald of Lisquinlan and Corkbeg
9. Eleanor or Helena FitzGerald
19. Elizabeth Tynte
2. Robert Uniacke-FitzGerald
10. Christian Borr
5. Helena Borr
11. Ellen Hore
1. Robert Uniacke-Fitzgerald
6. Judge John Lepp Judkin of Cashel, Co Tipperary
3. Frances Lepp Judkin

Parliament of Ireland
Preceded by Robert King, Viscount Kingsborough; Henry Boyle, Viscount Boyle	Member of Parliament for County Cork; 1798–1800; With: Henry Boyle, Viscount Boyle	Succeeded by Parliament of the United Kingdom
Parliament of the United Kingdom
New constituency	Member of Parliament for County Cork; 1801–1807; With: Henry Boyle, Viscount Boyle	Succeeded by Henry Boyle, Viscount Boyle; George Ponsonby
