= Order of St Patrick =

Dormant British order of chivalry associated with Ireland

Most Illustrious Order of Saint Patrick
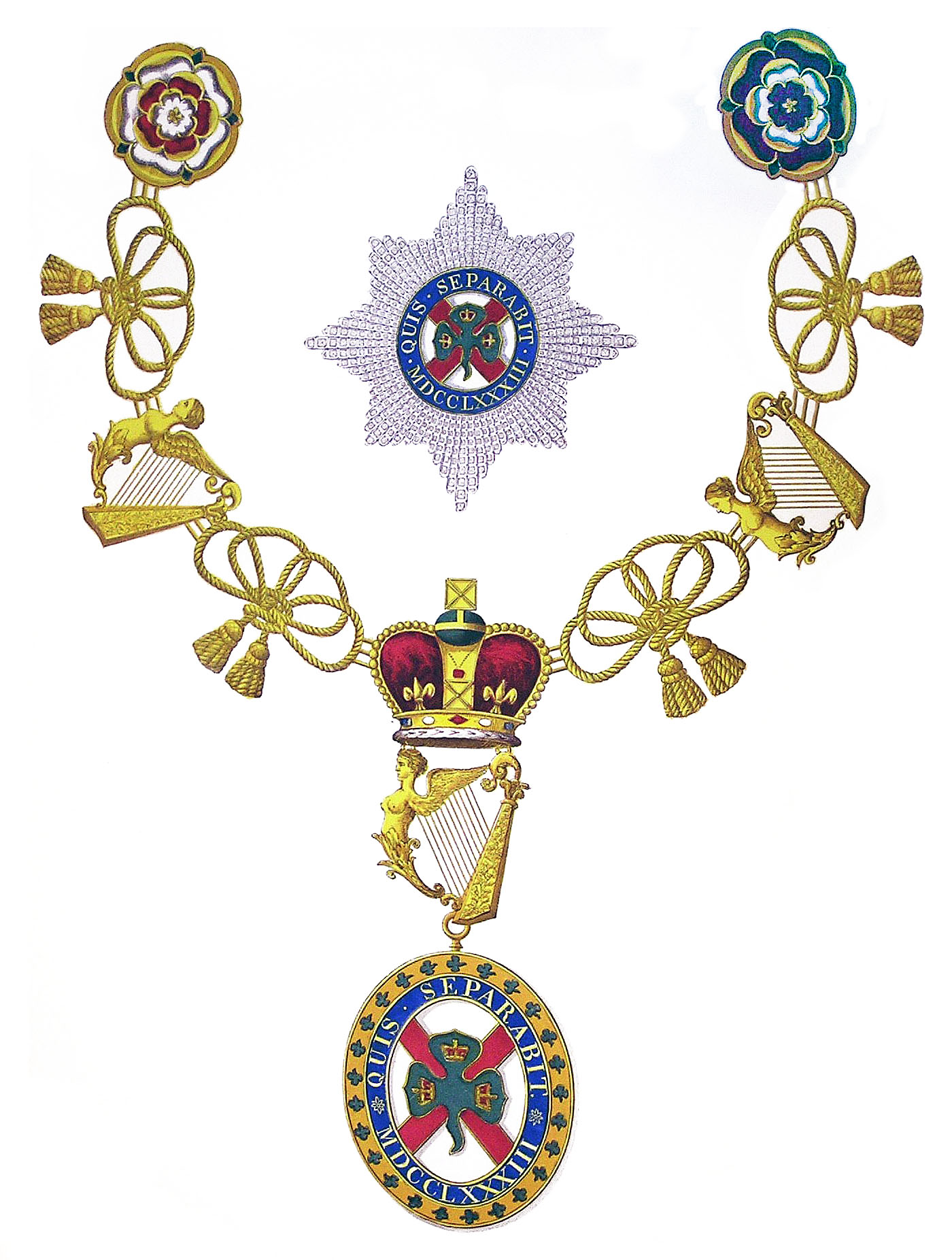
- Insignia of a Knight of the Order of St. Patrick

Awarded by the monarch of the United Kingdom
- Type: Order of chivalry
- Established: 1783
- Motto: Quis separabit?
- Criteria: At the monarch's pleasure
- Status: Last appointment in 1936; Dormant order since 1974
- Founder: George III
- Sovereign: Charles III
- Grades: Knight (KP)

Precedence
- Next (higher): Order of the Thistle
- Next (lower): Order of the Bath
- Riband of the Order of St. Patrick

The Most Illustrious Order of Saint Patrick is a dormant British order of chivalry associated with Ireland. The Order was created in 1783 by King George III at the request of the then Lord Lieutenant of Ireland, the 3rd Earl Temple (later created Marquess of Buckingham). The regular creation of knights of the Order lasted until 1922, when most of Ireland gained independence as the Irish Free State, a dominion within what was then known as the British Commonwealth of Nations. While the Order technically still exists, no knight of St Patrick has been created since 1936, and the last surviving knight, Prince Henry, Duke of Gloucester, died in 1974. Charles III, however, remains the Sovereign of the Order, and one officer, the Ulster King of Arms (now represented in the office of Norroy and Ulster King of Arms), also survives. Saint Patrick is patron of the order; its motto is Quis separabit?, Latin for "Who will separate [us]?": an allusion to the Vulgate translation of Romans 8:35, "Who shall separate us from the love of Christ?"

Most British orders of chivalry cover the entire United Kingdom, but each of the three most senior ones pertains to one constituent country only. The Order of St Patrick, which pertains to Ireland, is the most junior of these three in precedence and age. Its equivalent in England, the Most Noble Order of the Garter, is the oldest order of chivalry in the British Isles, dating from the mid-fourteenth century. The Scottish equivalent is the Most Ancient and Most Noble Order of the Thistle, dating in its present form from 1687.

== History ==
=== Early history ===
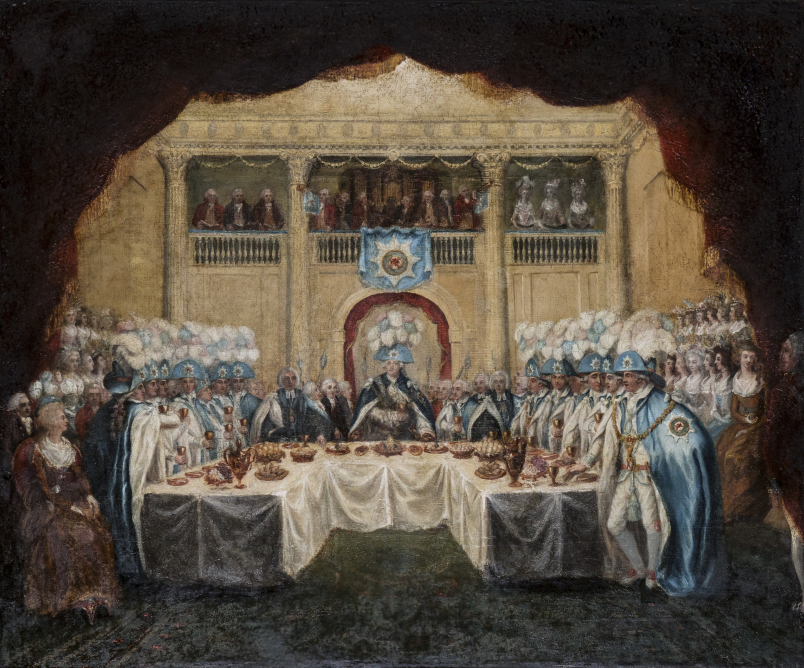
The installation dinner for the founding of the order took place on 17 March 1783 in the Great Hall of Dublin Castle.

The order was founded in 1783, a year after the grant of substantial autonomy to Ireland, as a means of rewarding (or obtaining) political support in the Irish Parliament. The Order of the Bath, founded in 1725, was instituted for similar reasons. The statutes of the Order restricted membership to men who were both knights and gentlemen, the latter being defined as having three generations of "noblesse" (meaning ancestors bearing coats of arms) on both their father's and mother's side. In practice, however, only Irish peers and British princes were ever appointed to the Order. The cross of St Patrick (a red saltire on a white background) was chosen as one of the symbols of the Order. A flag of this design was later incorporated into the Union Flag. Its association with Saint Patrick or with Ireland prior to the foundation of the Order is unclear, however. One of the first knights was William FitzGerald, 2nd Duke of Leinster, whose arms carry the same cross.

=== After 1922 ===
The last non-royal member appointed to the Order was James Hamilton, 3rd Duke of Abercorn in 1922, who served as the first Governor of Northern Ireland. When the Irish Free State left the United Kingdom in December of that same year, the Irish Executive Council under W. T. Cosgrave chose to make no further appointments to the Order.

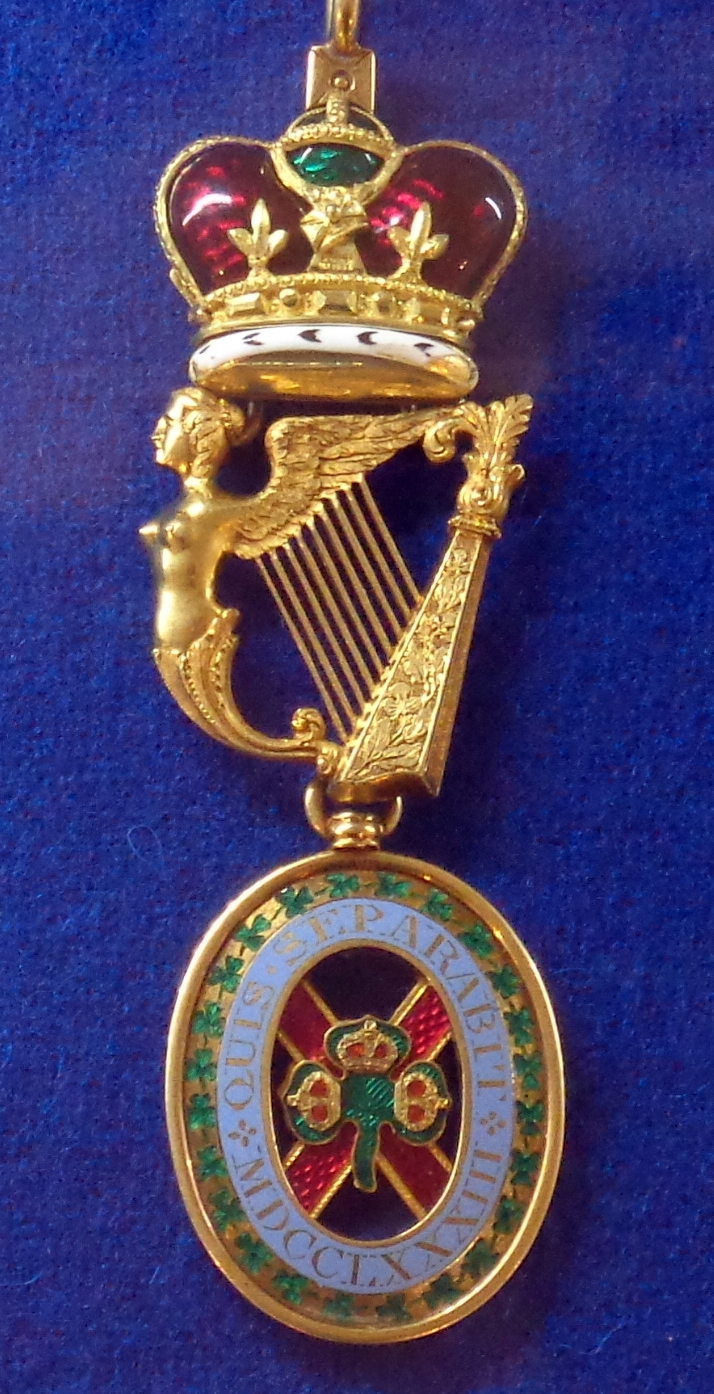
Badge of the order of St Patrick

Collar of the Order of St Patrick

Since then, only three people have been appointed to the Order, all members of the British royal family: the then-Prince of Wales (the future King Edward VIII and later Duke of Windsor) in 1927, and two of his younger brothers, Prince Henry, Duke of Gloucester in 1934, and Prince Albert, Duke of York (later King George VI) in 1936.

The Constitution of Ireland of 1937 provides that "Titles of nobility shall not be conferred by the State" (Article 40.2.1°) and "No title of nobility or of honour may be accepted by any citizen except with the prior approval of the Government" (Article 40.2.2°). Legal experts are divided on whether this clause prohibits the awarding of membership of the Order of St Patrick to Irish citizens, but some suggest that the phrase "titles of nobility" implies hereditary peerages and other noble titles, not lifetime honours such as knighthoods. This argument does not address the words "or of honour" however.

Today, Irish citizens who accept British honours – such as the late Terry Wogan or Bob Geldof – do so on a purely honorary basis. They may not use the honorific "Sir" or "Dame" unless they subsequently adopt British or Commonwealth citizenship, which Wogan did.

The last living non-royal recipient, Anthony Ashley-Cooper, 9th Earl of Shaftesbury, died in 1961. Prince Henry, Duke of Gloucester, at his death in 1974, was the last surviving knight. As of 2016, the Order was considered technically extant with its head Queen Elizabeth II and one officer, Norroy and Ulster King of Arms.

=== Possible revival ===
Prime Minister Winston Churchill suggested reviving the Order in 1943 to recognise the services in North Africa of General Sir Harold Alexander, a member of an Ulster Scots family from County Tyrone, but the opinion of the other ministers and civil servants was that it would upset the diplomatic balance between London and Dublin. Taoiseach Seán Lemass considered reviving the Order during the 1960s, but did not take a decision.

Modern revival of the Order has been raised in Parliament.

== Composition ==
=== Members ===
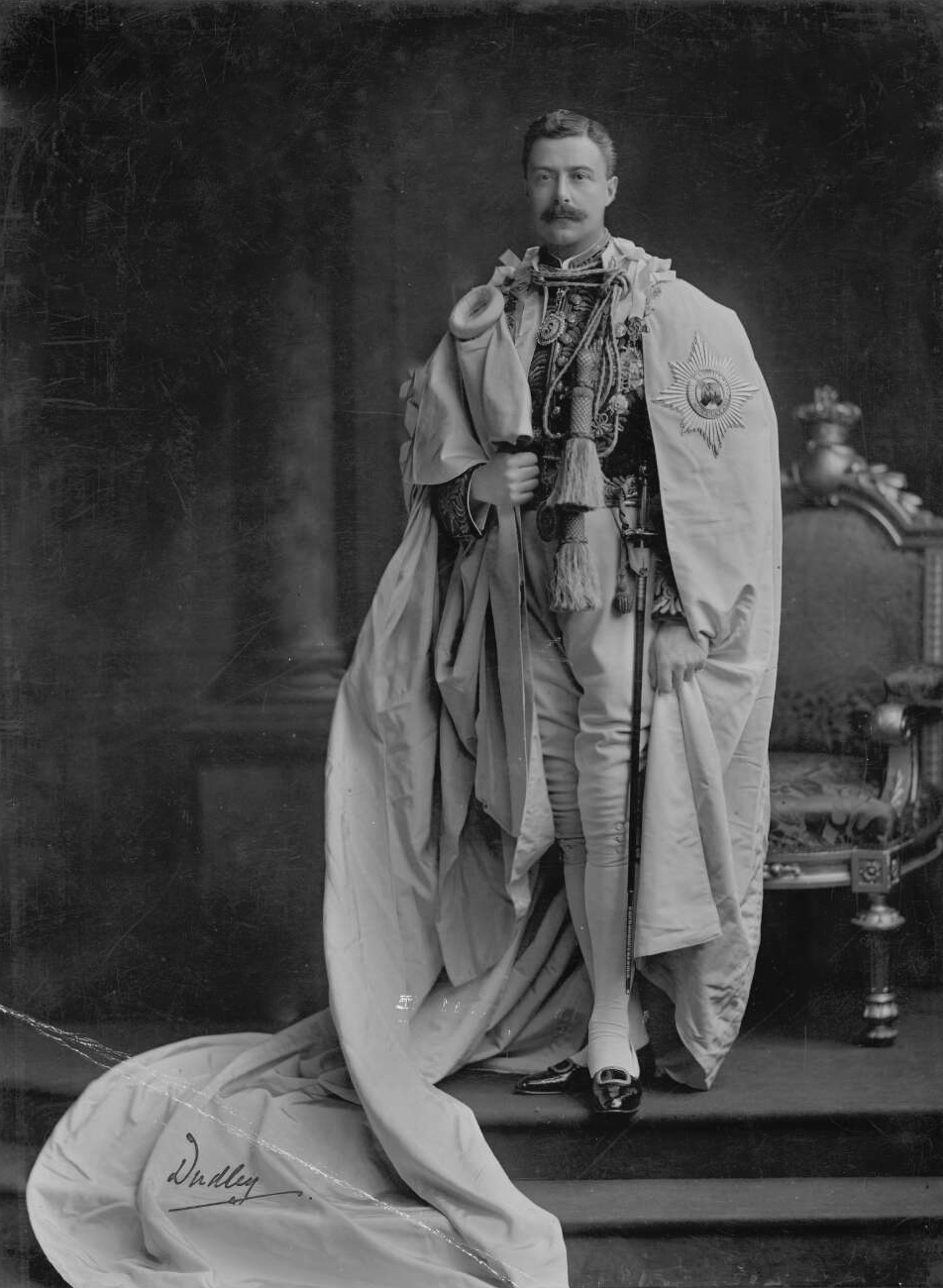
William Ward, 2nd Earl of Dudley (Lord Lieutenant of Ireland, 1902–1905) wearing the Irish Crown Jewels as ex officio Grand Master of the Order of St Patrick.

The British monarch is the Sovereign of the Order of St Patrick. The Lord Lieutenant of Ireland, the monarch's representative in Ireland, served as the Grand Master. The office of Lord Lieutenant was abolished in 1922; the last Lord Lieutenant and Grand Master was Edmund FitzAlan-Howard, 1st Viscount FitzAlan of Derwent. Initially, the statutes of the Order did not provide that the Grand Master be admitted to the Order as a matter of right. While some Lords Lieutenant were in fact appointed to the Order, this seems to have been the exception rather than the rule. In 1839, Queen Victoria altered this and, though not a member during his Grand Mastership, he was permitted to retain the insignia after his term of office.

The Order originally consisted of fifteen knights in addition to the Sovereign. In 1821, however, George IV appointed six additional knights; he did not issue a Royal Warrant authorising the change until 1830. William IV formally changed the statutes in 1833, increasing the limit to twenty-two knights.

The original statutes, based heavily on those of the Order of the Garter, prescribed that any vacancy should be filled by the sovereign upon the nomination of the members. Each knight was to propose nine candidates, of whom three had to have the rank of earl or higher, three the rank of baron or higher, and three the rank of knight or higher, and a vote taken. In practice this system was never used; the grand master would nominate a peer, the Sovereign would usually assent, and a chapter meeting was held at which the knights "elected" the new member. The Order of St Patrick differed from its English and Scottish counterparts, the Orders of the Garter and the Thistle, in only ever appointing peers and princes. Women were never admitted to the Order of St Patrick; they were not eligible to become members of the other two orders until 1987. The only woman to be part of the Order was Queen Victoria, in her capacity as Sovereign of the Order. Although it was associated with the established Church of Ireland until 1871, several Catholics were appointed to the order throughout its history.

=== Officers ===
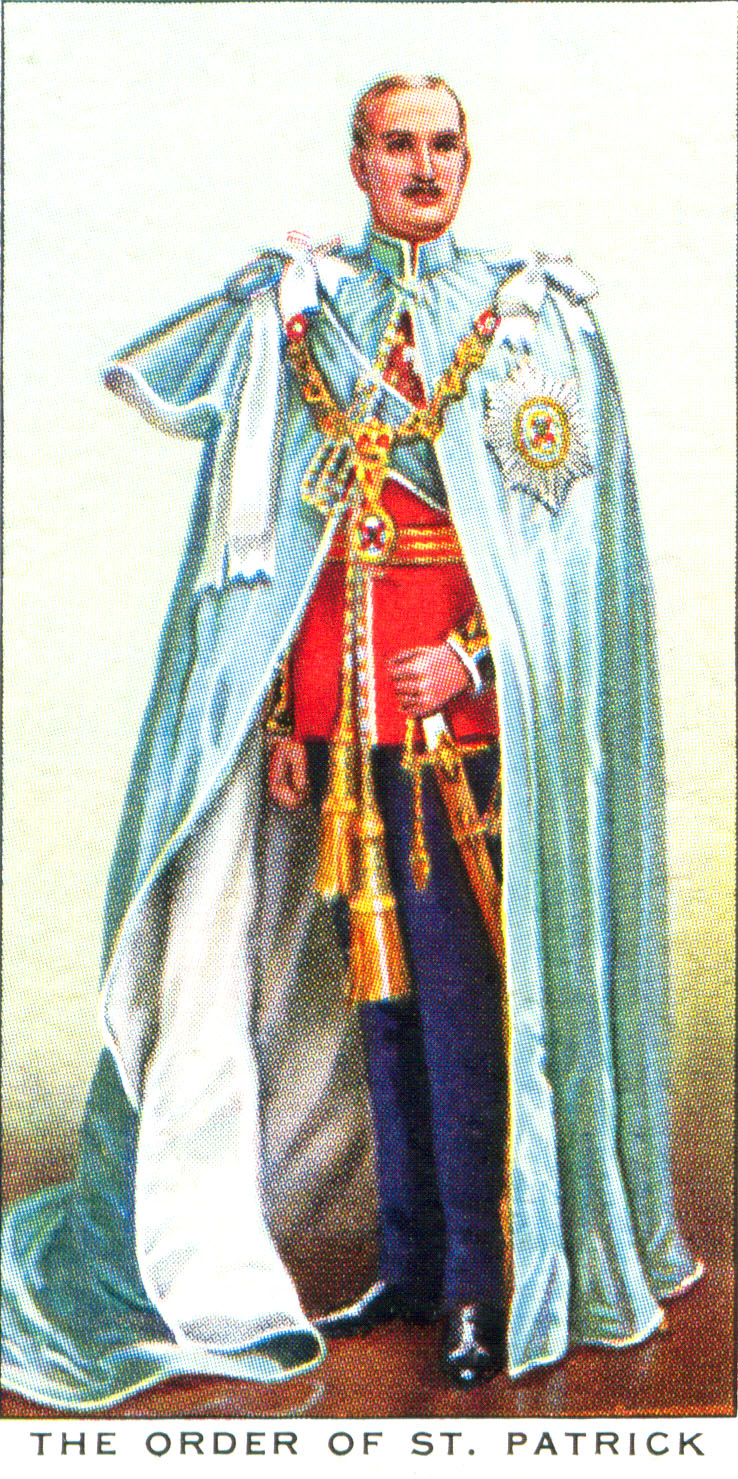
Knight of the Order of Saint Patrick

The Order of St Patrick initially had thirteen officers: the Prelate, the Chancellor, the Registrar, the Usher, the Secretary, the Genealogist, the King of Arms, two heralds and four pursuivants. Many of these offices were held by clergymen of the Church of Ireland, then the established church. After the disestablishment of the Church in 1871, the ecclesiastics were allowed to remain in office until their deaths, when the offices were either abolished or reassigned to lay officials. All offices except that of Registrar and King of Arms are now vacant.

The office of Prelate was held by the Archbishop of Armagh, the most senior clergyman in the Church of Ireland. The Prelate was not mentioned in the original statutes, but was created by a warrant shortly afterwards, apparently because the then Archbishop asked to be appointed to the post. Since the death of the last holder in 1885, the office has remained vacant.

The Church of Ireland's second highest cleric, the Archbishop of Dublin, originally served as the Chancellor of the Order. From 1886 onwards, the office was held by the Chief Secretary for Ireland. Since the abolition of the position of Chief Secretary in 1922, the office of Chancellor has remained vacant. The Dean of St Patrick's Cathedral was originally the Registrar of the Order. In 1890, on the death of the Dean who had held the post at the time of disestablishment, the office was attached to that of the King of Arms of the Order. This position was held by Ulster King of Arms, Ireland's chief heraldic official, a post which had been created in 1552. In 1943, this post was in effect divided in two, reflecting the partition of Ireland in the Government of Ireland Act 1920. The position, insofar as it related to Northern Ireland, was combined with that of Norroy King of Arms (who had heraldic jurisdiction in the north of England). The post of Norroy and Ulster King of Arms still exists, and thus continues to hold the offices of Registrar and King of Arms of the Order of St Patrick. The office of Ulster King of Arms, insofar as it related to the Irish Free State (now officially called Ireland), became the position of Chief Herald of Ireland.

The Order had six other heraldic officers, many more than any other British order. The two heralds were known as Cork and Dublin Heralds. Three of the four pursuivants were untitled, the fourth was held by Athlone Pursuivant, founded in 1552.

The Usher of the Order was "the Usher at Arms named the Black Rod". The Irish Black Rod was an officer of the Irish House of Lords similar to the Black Rod of the British House of Lords. Although the Irish Lords was abolished by the Acts of Union 1800, the office of Irish Black Rod continued to exist as Usher of the Order.

The offices of Secretary and Genealogist were originally held by members of the Irish House of Commons. The office of Secretary has been vacant since 1926. The position of Genealogist was left vacant in 1885, restored in 1889, but left vacant again in 1930.

== Vestments and accoutrements ==
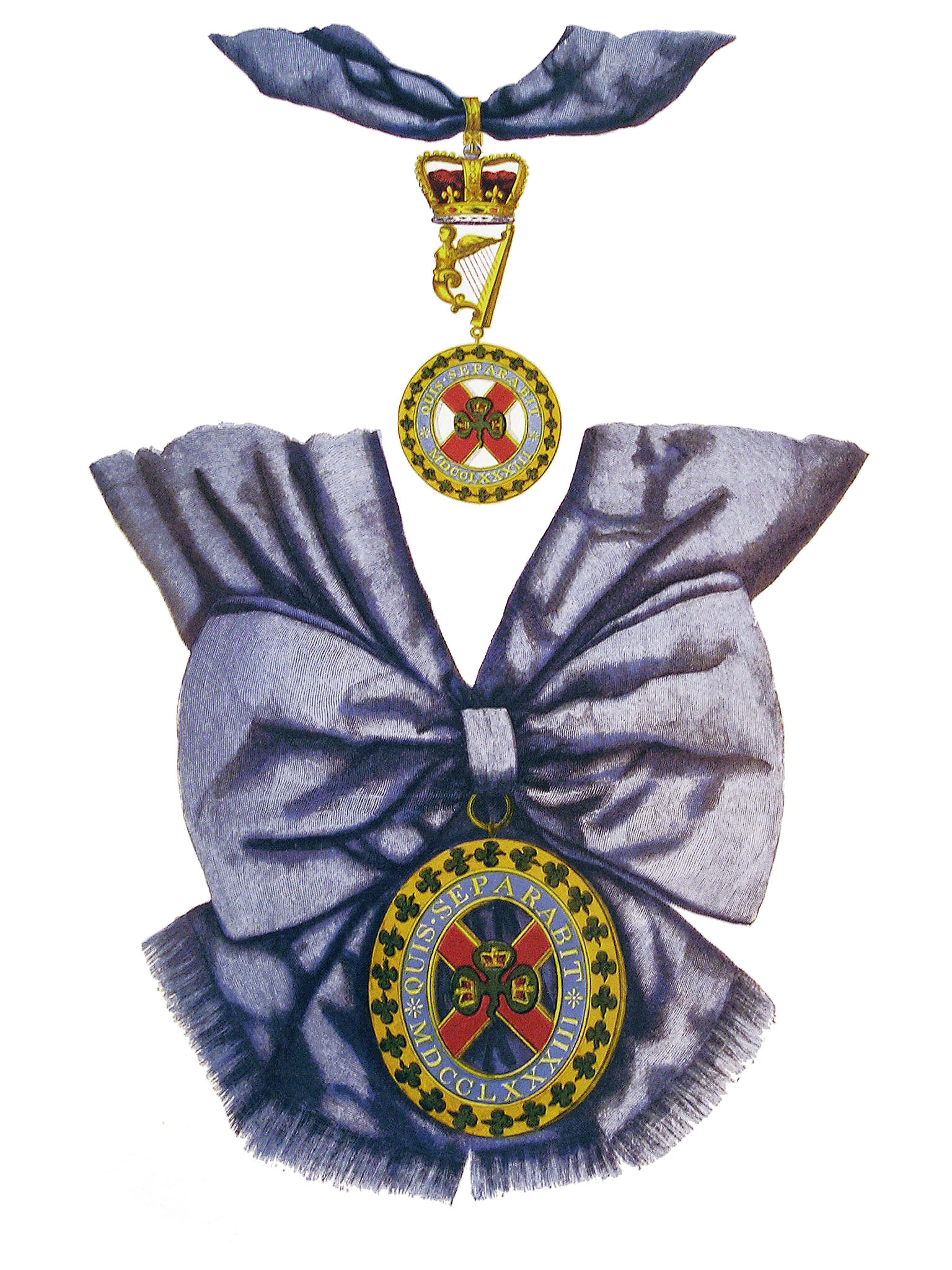
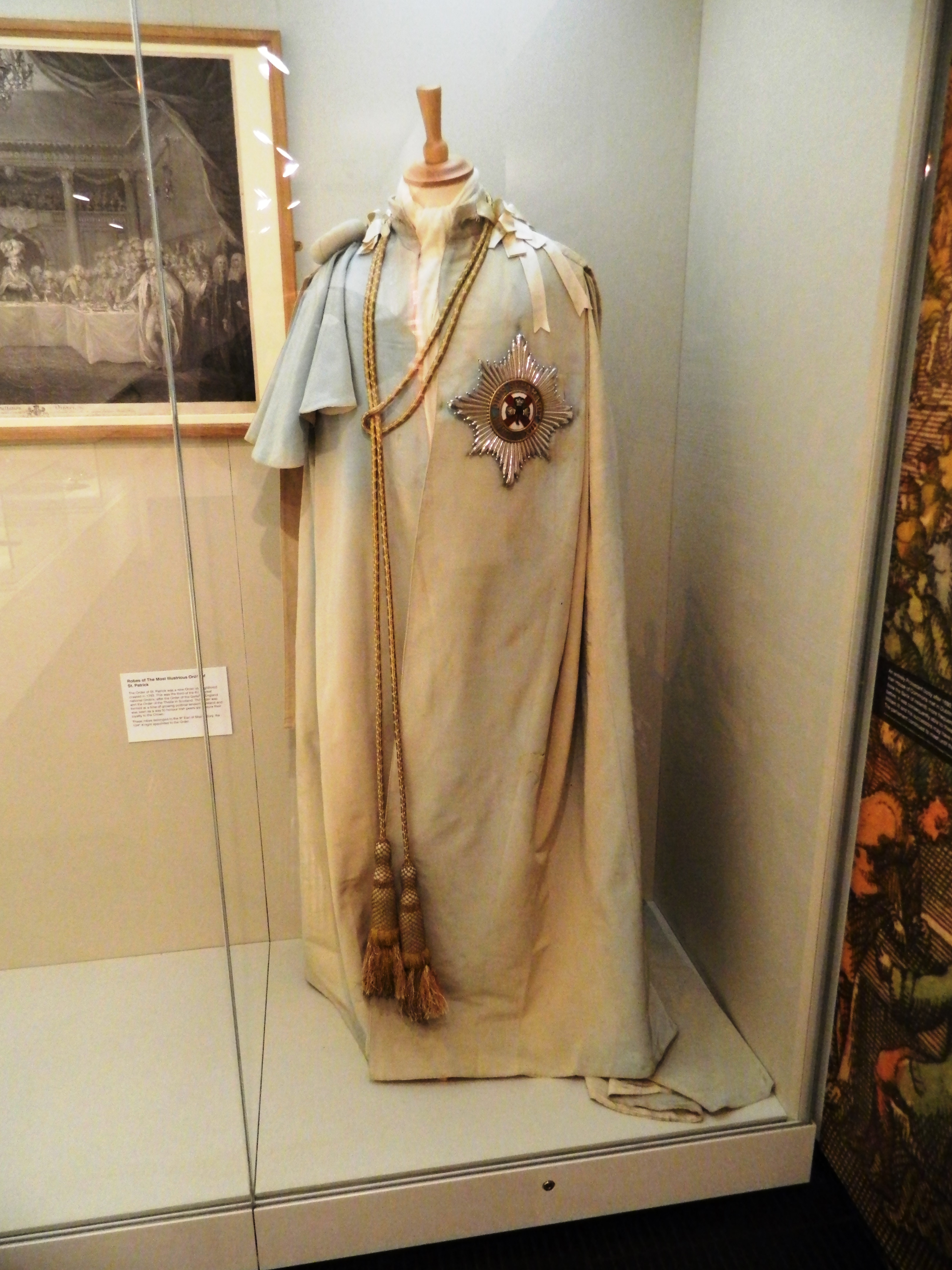
Left: The badge of the Order. The statutes of the Order prescribed a sky-blue riband; the exact shade of blue used varied over time. Right: Mantle of the Order.

For important occasions, such as coronations and investitures of new members of the Order, Knights of St Patrick wore elaborate vestments:

- The mantle was a celestial blue robe lined with white silk. The star of the Order (see below) was depicted on the left of the mantle. A blue hood was attached to the mantle.
- The hat of the Order was originally of white satin, lined with blue, but was changed to black velvet by George IV. It was plumed with three falls of feathers, one red, one white and one blue.
- The collar was made of gold, consisting of Tudor roses and harps attached with knots. The two roses which comprise the Tudor rose were alternately enamelled white within red, and red within white. The central harp, from which the badge of the Order was suspended, was surmounted by a crown.

Aside from these special occasions, much simpler accoutrements were used:

- The star of the Order was an eight-pointed figure, with the four cardinal points longer than the intermediate points. Each point was shown as a cluster of rays. In the centre was the same motto, year and design that appeared on the badge. The star was worn pinned to the left breast.
- The broad riband was a celestial blue sash worn across the body, from the right shoulder to the left hip. The sash of the Order of the Garter, darker in colour, is worn from the left shoulder.
- The badge was pinned to the riband at the left hip. Made of gold, it depicted a shamrock bearing three crowns, on top of a cross of St Patrick and surrounded by a blue circle bearing the motto in majuscules, as well as the date of the Order's foundation in Roman numerals ("MDCCLXXXIII").

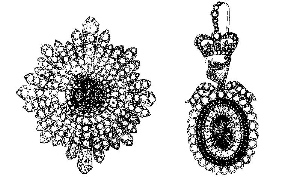
The Irish Crown Jewels

The Grand Master's insignia were of the same form and design as those of the Knights. In 1831, however, William IV presented the Grand Master with a star and badge, each composed of rubies, emeralds and Brazilian diamonds. These two insignia were designated "Crown Jewels" in the Order's 1905 Statutes, and the designation "Irish Crown Jewels" was emphasised by newspapers when they were stolen in 1907, along with the collars of five Knights; they have not since been recovered.

A number of items pertaining to the Order of St Patrick are held in museums in both the Republic of Ireland and Northern Ireland. The robes of Luke Gerald Dillon, 4th Baron Clonbrock, the 122nd Knight of the Order, are on display in the National Museum of Ireland, Dublin; the robe belonging to Francis Charles Needham, 3rd Earl of Kilmorey is held by the Newry Museum; the National Gallery of Ireland and Genealogical Museum in Dublin both have Stars of the Order; and the Ulster Museum (part of the National Museums and Galleries of Northern Ireland) in Stranmillis has a large collection on display and two mantles in storage. The Irish Guards take their capstar and motto from the Order.

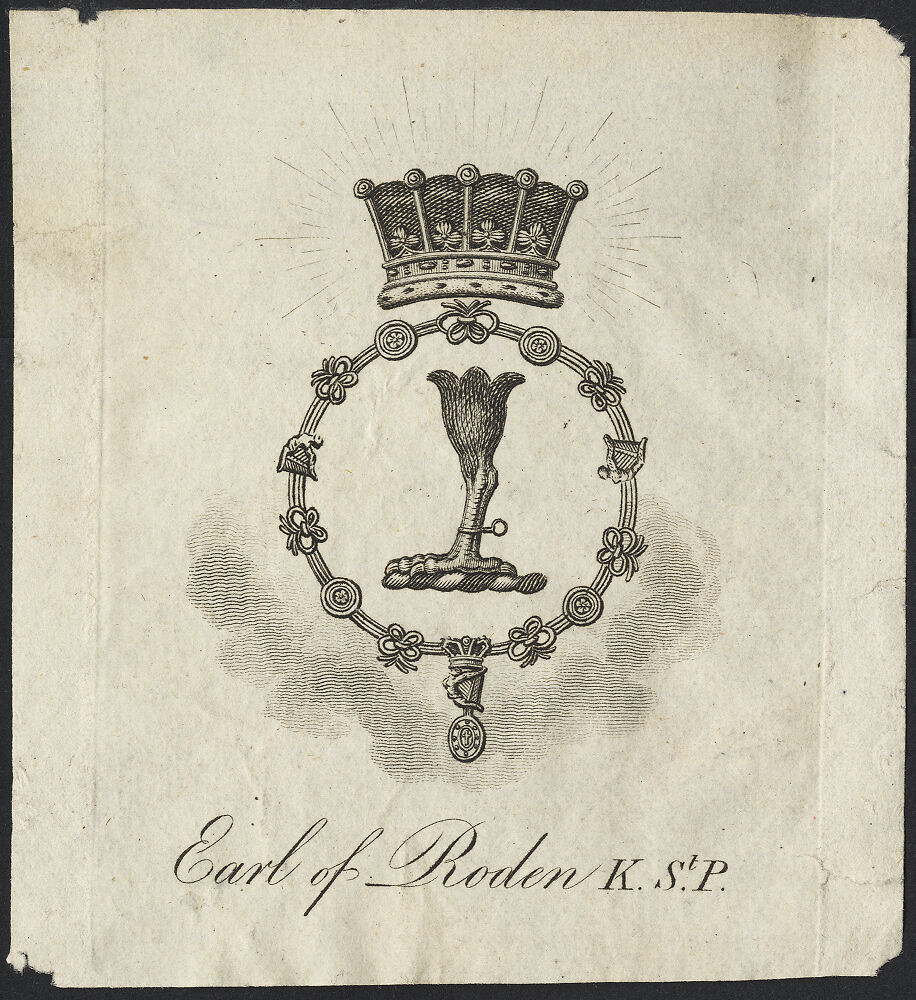
Heraldic device of Robert Jocelyn, 3rd Earl of Roden, showing crest (falcon's leg, belled), coronet of an earl, and collar of the Order of Saint Patrick.

== Chapel and Chancery ==
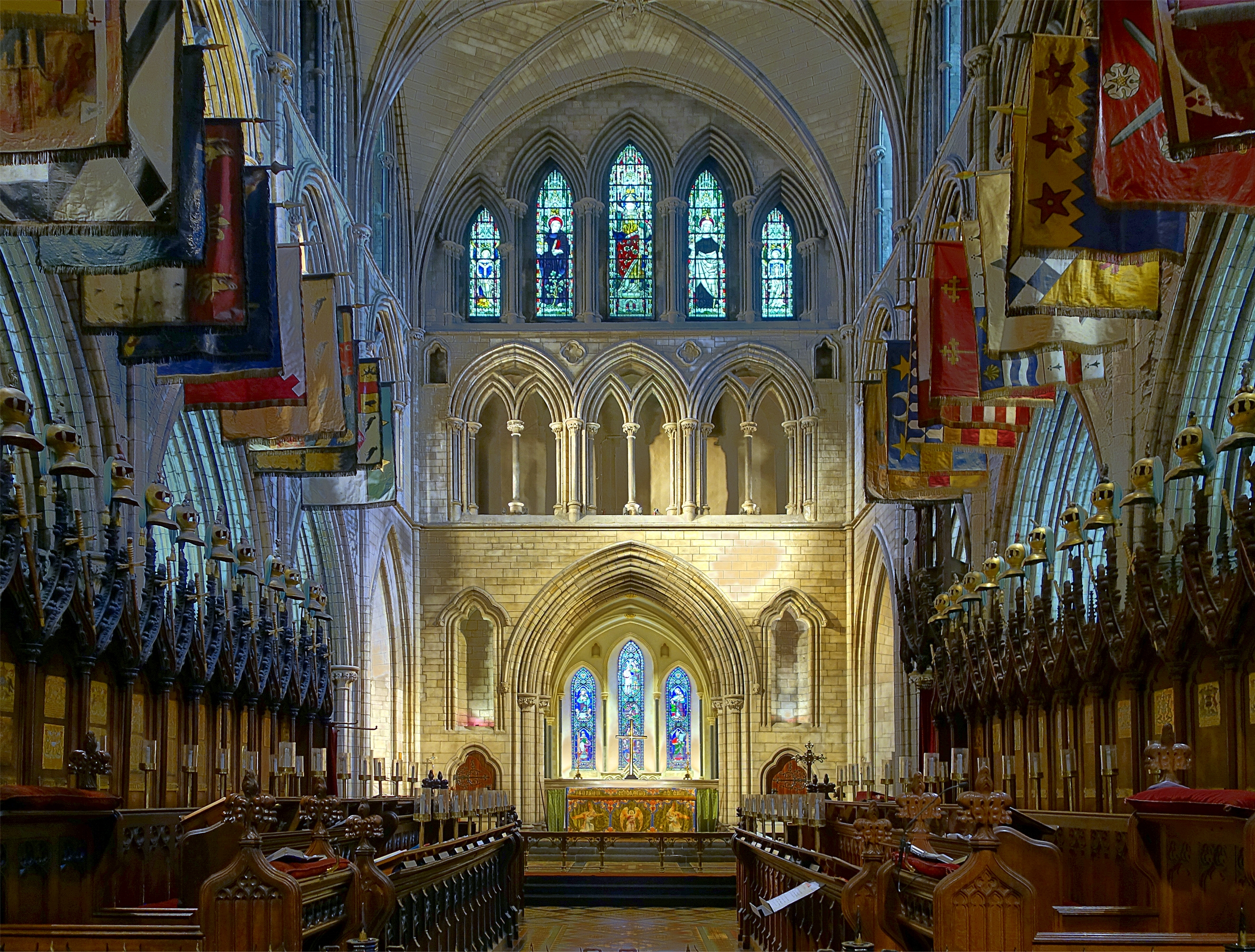
Choir of St Patrick's Cathedral, Dublin, with the banners of those who were Knights of St Patrick in 1871

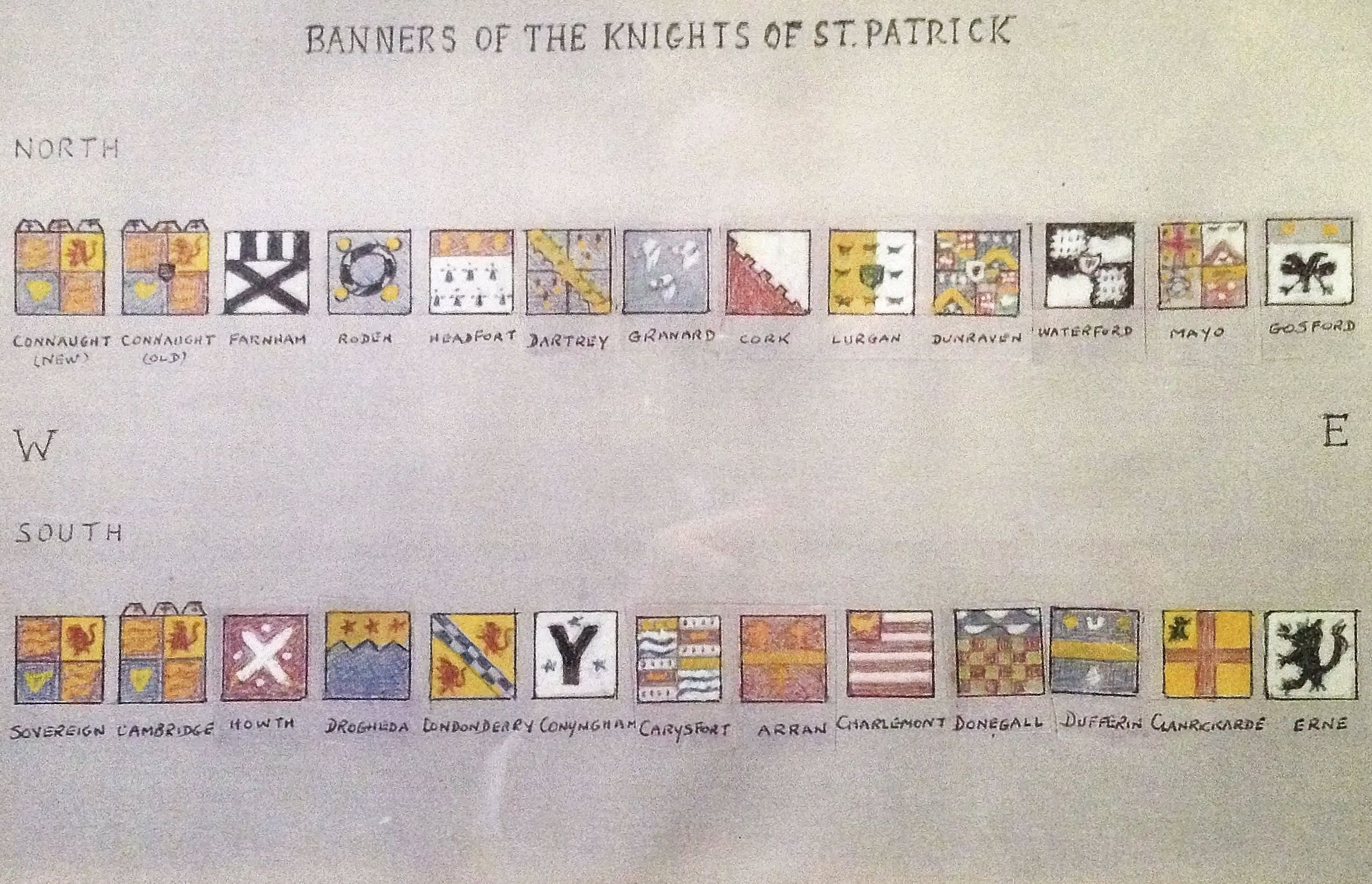
Wall tablet in the choir of St Patrick's Cathedral identifying the heraldic banners on display

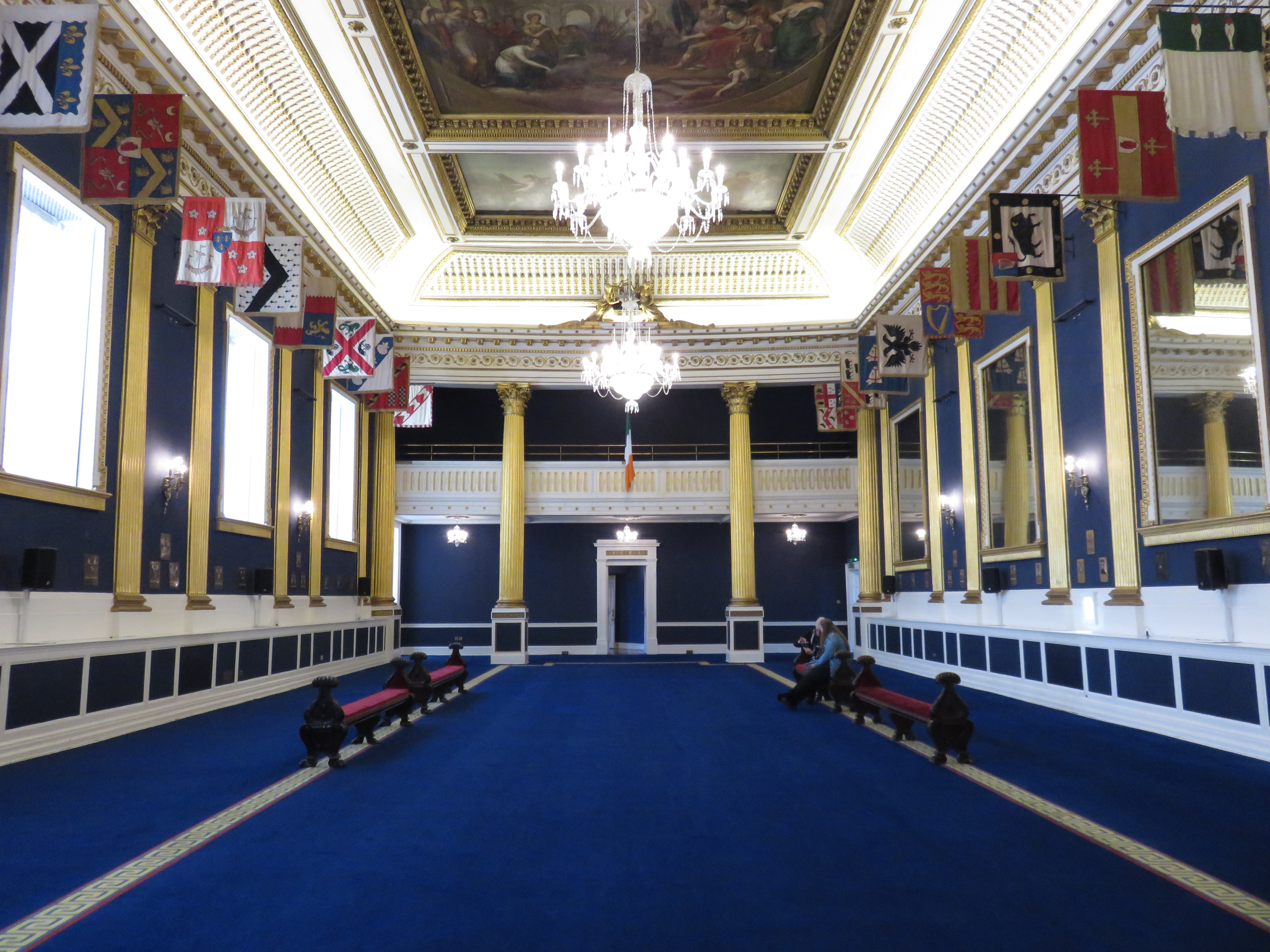
St. Patrick's Hall, Dublin Castle, with the banners of those who were Knights of St Patrick in 1922

The Chapel of the Order was originally in St Patrick's Cathedral in central Dublin. Each member of the Order, including the sovereign, was allotted a stall in the choir of the chapel, above which his (or her, in the case of Queen Victoria) heraldic devices were displayed. Perched on the pinnacle of a knight's stall was a helm, decorated with mantling and topped by his crest. Above the crest, the knight's heraldic banner was hung, emblazoned with his coat of arms. At a considerably smaller scale, to the back of the stall was affixed a piece of brass (a "stall plate") displaying its occupant's name, arms and date of admission into the Order. Upon the death of a Knight, the banner and crest were taken down and replaced with those of his successor. After the disestablishment of the Church of Ireland in 1871, the Chapel ceased to be used; the heraldic devices of the knights at the time were left in place at the request of Queen Victoria.

The Order was without a ceremonial home until 1881 when arrangements were made to display banners, helms and hatchment plates (the equivalent of stall plates, in the absence of stalls) in the Great Hall, officially called St. Patrick's Hall, in Dublin Castle. On the establishment of the Irish Free State, the banners of the living knights were removed. When the Hall was redecorated in 1962 it was decided that it should be hung with the banners of the members of the Order in 1922. The existing banners were repaired or new ones made; it is these banners which can be seen today. The Hall, which was renamed St Patrick's Hall from its association with the Order, also served as the Chancery of the Order. Installation ceremonies, and later investitures, were held here, often on Saint Patrick's Day, until they were discontinued. A banquet for the Knights was often held in the Hall on the occasion of an installation. St Patrick's Hall now serves as the location for the inauguration of the president of Ireland.

Unlike many of the other British orders, the stall plates (or hatchment plates) do not form a continuous record of the knights of the order. There are only 34 stall plates for the 80 or so knights appointed before 1871 (although others were destroyed in a fire in 1940) and 40 hatchment plates for the 60 knights appointed subsequently. In the case of the stall plates, this was perhaps due to their size, 30 cm × 36 cm (12 in × 14 in).

== Precedence and privileges ==
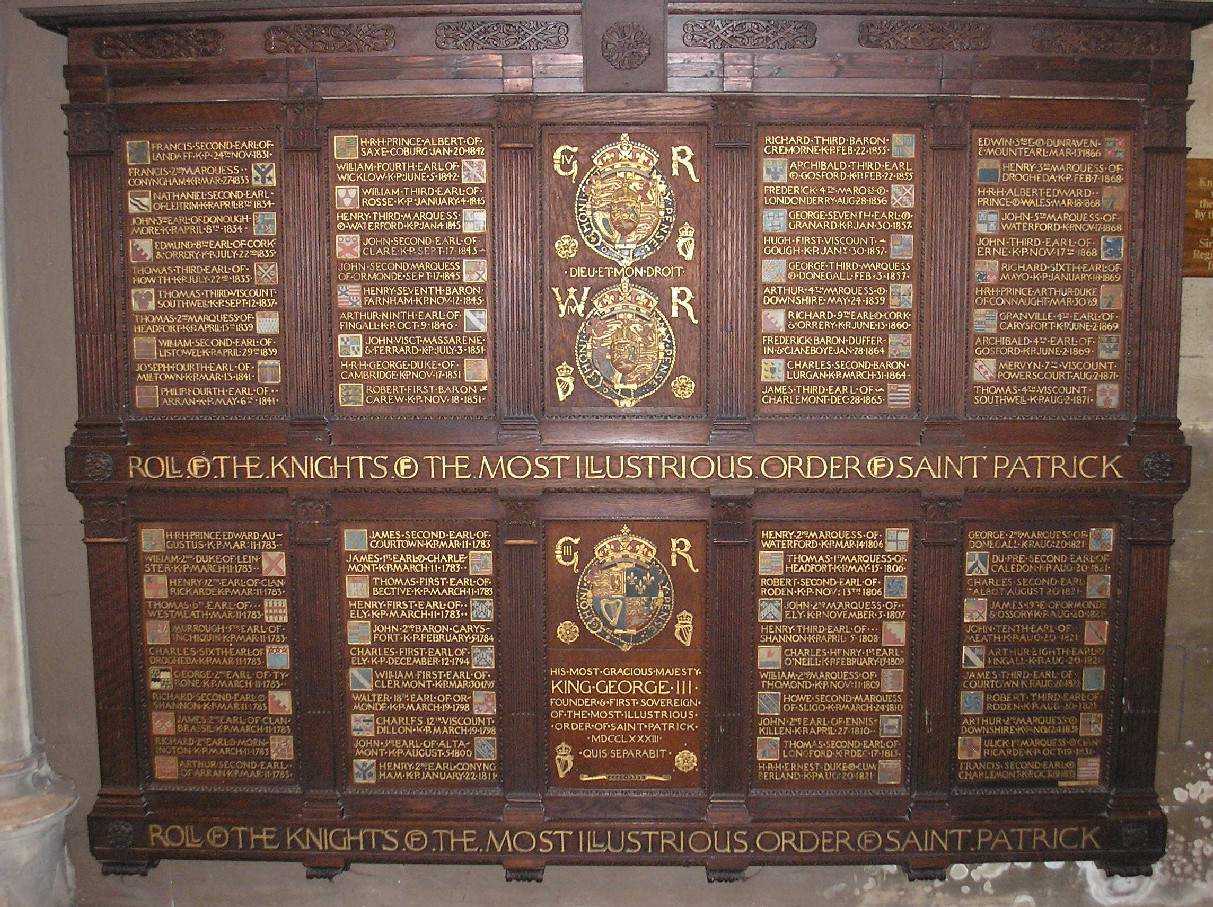
A panel recording some members of the Order of St Patrick in St Patrick's Cathedral, Dublin.

Since the members of the Order were required to be knights, and in practice had higher rank, many of the privileges of membership were rendered moot. As knights, they could prefix "Sir" to their forenames, but the form was never used in speech, as they were referred to by their peerage dignities. They were assigned positions in the order of precedence, but had higher positions by virtue of their peerage dignities.

Knights used the post-nominal letters "KP" or "KStP". When an individual was entitled to use multiple post-nominal letters, KP appeared before all others, except "Bt" and "Btss" (Baronet and Baronetess), "VC" (Victoria Cross), "GC" (George Cross), "KG" (Knight Companion of the Garter) and "KT" (Knight of the Thistle).

Arms of Edward Ponsonby, 8th Earl of Bessborough, which had the circlet and collar of the Order.

Knights could encircle their arms with a depiction of the circlet (a blue circle bearing the motto) and the collar; the former is shown either outside or on top of the latter. The badge is depicted suspended from the collar. They were also entitled to receive heraldic supporters.

== See also ==
- List of knights of St Patrick
