= Cox baronets =

Defunct baronetage

There have been two baronetcies created for persons with the surname Cox, one in the Baronetage of Ireland and one in the Baronetage of the United Kingdom. Both creations are extinct.

- Cox baronets of Dunmanway (1706)
- Cox baronets of Old Windsor (1921)
