= Archdeacon of Cashel =

The Archdeacon of Cashel was a senior ecclesiastical officer in the Diocese of Cashel which later became a post shared with Emly.
