= Bandon (UK Parliament constituency) =

UK parliamentary constituency in Ireland, 1801–1885

- Former borough constituency for the House of Commons
- County: County Cork
- Borough: Bandon

1801–1885
- Seats: 1
- Created from: Bandonbridge
- Replaced by: South East Cork

Bandon (sometimes called Bandon Bridge or Bandonbridge) was a borough constituency representing the parliamentary borough of Bandon in County Cork, Ireland from 1801 to 1885. It elected one Member of Parliament (MP) to the House of Commons of the United Kingdom of Great Britain and Ireland.

Bandon was a borough constituency with two representatives in the Irish House of Commons before 1801. The borough retained one member after the Acts of Union, until the borough was disfranchised in 1885.

== Boundaries ==
A report into the boundaries was undertaken in 1831. The report found that limits of the borough were not known, but as it was certain that it was not co-extensive with the town, it drew a boundary line comprising the whole of what might be considered the town. In 1832 a new boundary was formed for electoral purposes closely encircling the town, and comprising an area of 439 acres (1.78 km^{2}), defined in the Parliamentary Boundaries (Ireland) Act 1832 as:

"From the Point at which the Eastern Road to Macroom leaves the old or Northern Road to Cork, in a straight Line in a Westerly Direction, to the North-western Corner of Mr. Swanson's Garden; thence along the Wall of the said Garden to the South-western Corner thereof; thence in a straight Line across the River Bandon, and across the Enniskane Road, to the Point at which the old Road to Clonakilty is joined by a Bye Road which runs thereto from the new Road to Clonakilty; thence along the said Bye Road to the Point at which the same joins the new Road to Clonakilty; thence towards Bandon, along the new Road to Clonakilty, to that Point thereof which is nearest to the Northern Pillar of the Gate of Mr. M'Creight's House; thence in a straight Line to the said Northern Pillar; thence in a straight Line across the centre Kilbritten Road to the Point at which the Eastern Kilbritten Road is joined by a small Bye Road running Westward to the Fields, about Three hundred and thirty Yards to the South of the Point at which the Eastern Kilbritten Road leaves the Innishannon Road; thence in a straight Line to the Southern Corner, on the Ballinade Road, of the Premises of Mr Ormond's Distillery; thence, Eastward, along the Boundary of the Premises of Mr. Ormond's Distillery to the Point at which the same meets the Southernmost Road to Innishannon; thence in a straight Line across the River Bandon to the Point at which the old Innishannon Road is joined by a Bye Road which runs North-west in the Direction of the Kilbrogan Chapel; thence in a straight Line to the Northern Pillar of a Gateway on the old Cork Road, about Four hundred and thirty Yards to the North of the Point at which the same leaves the Innishannon Road; thence in a straight Line to the Point first described."

== History ==
Before the Representation of the People (Ireland) Act 1832, the parliamentary franchise for this constituency was extremely restricted. Only the provost (who was the returning officer for the borough) and the twelve burgesses were enfranchised. The population of the town, in 1821, was 10,179. All the elections in this period were unopposed returns; except for one election in 1831, where only ten voters participated and eleven votes were cast (including the returning officer's casting vote).

Stooks Smith gives an account of this contested election. It was the second by-election of 1831.

This election took place on 22 July. After the Provost, (John Swete, Esq.) had been sworn, the Hon. W.S. Bernard rose, and without preface or remark, proposed Sir Augustus William Clifford, Kt., (the Duke of Devonshire's nominee) as a fit and proper representative for the borough of Bandon in Parliament; John Leslie, Esq., seconded the proposition. The Rev. Somers Payne then rose and proposed Viscount Lowther to the burgesses; the Rev. Richard Meade seconded the nomination. By way of ruse, or pairing off, Viscount Bernard was proposed by John Beamish, Esq., and seconded by Ambrose Hikey, Esq., two gentlemen of opposite opinions.

No other candidate being proposed, the Town Clerk asked the Provost for whom he would vote, in his official capacity? This was objected by Mr. Meade and Mr. Payne, who stated that, though a long time connected with the Corporation, they never knew this line of proceeding to be adopted. This was over-ruled by the assessor, who quoted in support of his opinion, an election case in the borough of Harwich, decided by a majority in the House of Commons. This point disposed of, the polling commenced, when the numbers were declared as follows.

- For Sir A. W. Clifford, 4 (Hon. William Smyth Bernard, Hon. Richard Boyle Bernard, John Leslie, Esq., John Swete, Esq.)
- For Viscount Lowther, 4 (W.H. Kingston, Esq., Rev. Richard Meade, Rev. Somers Payne, Benjamin Swete, Esq.)
- For Viscount Bernard, 2 (John Beamish, Esq., Ambrose Hickey, Esq.)

The Provost, as returning officer, then gave his vote for Sir A.W. Clifford, who was about to be duly elected, when Mr. Payne said, I object to the monopoly of the Provost, He has no right to more than one vote. The assessor (A. Connell, Esq.):- We shall take your objection if you state it in writing. A protest was then entered by Mr. Payne and those who voted for Viscount Lowther; and Sir A.W. Clifford was declared duly elected.

The franchise was expanded under the Representation of the People (Ireland) Act 1832, when the £10 householders were added to the electorate and the registration of voters was introduced. In the election later that year, there were 266 registered electors in Bandon and 233 votes were cast in the general election. It appears, from the list of MPs and the report of the 1831 election, that the choice of the borough electorate both before and after 1832 was influenced by aristocratic patrons like the Duke of Devonshire and the Bernard family (whose head had the title of Earl of Bandon). If a Bernard was not elected then quite prominent political figures, notably the future Whig leaders George Tierney and Lord John Russell, were sometimes returned for the borough.

The constituency was disfranchised in 1885. The area was then represented in Parliament as part of South East Cork, one of seven divisions of the former constituency of County Cork.

== Members of Parliament ==
Notable MPs include Lord John Russell, later prime minister (1846–1852 and 1865–1866), and William Shaw, later leader of the Home Rule League (1879–1880).

Election	Member	Party	Note
1801, 1 January	Sir Broderick Chinnery, Bt	Whig	1801: Co-opted
1806, 15 November	Hon. Courtenay Boyle	Tory	
1807, 15 May	Henry Boyle, Viscount Boyle	Tory	Succeeded as the 3rd Earl of Shannon
1807, 3 August	Rt Hon. George Tierney	Whig	
1812, 16 October	Hon. Richard Bernard	Tory	Resigned
1815, 24 March	William Sturges Bourne	Tory	
1818, 27 June	Augustus Clifford	Whig	
1820, 13 March	James Bernard, Viscount Bernard	Tory	
1826, 17 June	John Ponsonby, Viscount Duncannon	Whig	Also returned by and elected to sit for County Kilkenny
1826, 19 December	Lord John Russell	Whig	
1830, 7 August	James Bernard, Viscount Bernard	Tory	Succeeded as the 2nd Earl of Bandon
1831, 6 January	Francis Bernard, Viscount Bernard	Tory	Resigned
1831, 22 July	Sir Augustus Clifford	Whig	
1832, 15 December	Hon. William Smyth Bernard	Conservative	
1835, 14 January	Joseph Devonsher Jackson	Conservative	Appointed Solicitor-General for Ireland
1842, 14 February	Francis Bernard, Viscount Bernard	Conservative	Succeeded as the 3rd Earl of Bandon
1857, 14 February	Hon. William Smyth Bernard	Conservative	Died
1863, 27 February	Hon. Henry Boyle Bernard	Conservative	
1868, 21 November	William Shaw	Liberal	
1874, 3 February	Alexander Swanston	Liberal	
1880, 2 April	Percy Bernard	Conservative	Resigned
1880, 25 June	Richard Allman	Liberal	Last MP for the constituency
1885	Constituency abolished		

== Elections ==
=== Elections in the 1880s ===
By-election, 25 June 1880: Bandon
Party	Candidate	Votes	%	±%
Liberal	Richard Allman	217	55.8	+7.7
Conservative	John Warren Payne	172	44.2	−7.7
Majority		45	11.6	N/A
Turnout		389	90.5	+1.0
Registered electors		430		
Liberal gain from Conservative		Swing	+7.7	

- Caused by Bernard's resignation.

General election 1880: Bandon
Party	Candidate	Votes	%	±%
Conservative	Percy Bernard	200	51.9	+2.6
Liberal	Richard Allman	185	48.1	−2.6
Majority		15	3.8	N/A
Turnout		385	89.5	−6.2
Registered electors		430		
Conservative gain from Liberal		Swing	+2.6	

=== Elections in the 1870s ===
General election 1874: Bandon
Party	Candidate	Votes	%	±%
Liberal	Alexander Swanston	180	50.7	0.0
Conservative	James Bernard	175	49.3	0.0
Majority		5	1.4	0.0
Turnout		355	95.7	+1.5
Registered electors		371		
Liberal hold		Swing	0.0	

=== Elections in the 1860s ===
General election 1868: Bandon
Party	Candidate	Votes	%	±%
Liberal	William Shaw	141	50.7	+1.9
Conservative	Henry Boyle Bernard	137	49.3	−1.9
Majority		4	1.4	N/A
Turnout		278	94.2	+0.3
Registered electors		295		
Liberal gain from Conservative		Swing	+1.9	

General election 1865: Bandon
Party	Candidate	Votes	%	±%
Conservative	Henry Boyle Bernard	111	51.2	N/A
Liberal	William Shaw	106	48.8	N/A
Majority		5	2.4	N/A
Turnout		217	93.9	N/A
Registered electors		231		
Conservative hold		Swing	N/A	

By-election, 27 February 1863: Bandon
Party	Candidate	Votes	%	±%
Conservative	Henry Boyle Bernard	124	60.8	N/A
Liberal	Thomas Kingston Sullivan	80	39.2	New
Majority		44	21.6	N/A
Turnout		204	88.3	N/A
Registered electors		231		
Conservative hold		Swing	N/A	

- Caused by Bernard's death

=== Elections in the 1850s ===
General election 1859: Bandon
Party	Candidate	Votes	%	±%
Conservative	William Smyth Bernard	Unopposed		
Registered electors		229		
Conservative hold				

General election 1857: Bandon
Party	Candidate	Votes	%	±%
Conservative	William Smyth Bernard	Unopposed		
Registered electors		201		
Conservative hold				

By-election, 14 February 1857: Bandon
Party	Candidate	Votes	%	±%
Conservative	William Smyth Bernard	101	60.1	N/A
Radical	William Shaw	67	39.9	New
Majority		34	20.2	N/A
Turnout		168	83.6	N/A
Registered electors		201		
Conservative hold		Swing	N/A	

- Caused by Bernard's succession to the peerage, becoming 3rd Earl of Bandon

General election 1852: Bandon
Party	Candidate	Votes	%	±%
Conservative	Francis Bernard	Unopposed		
Registered electors		209		
Conservative hold				

=== Elections in the 1840s ===
General election 1847: Bandon
Party	Candidate	Votes	%	±%
Conservative	Francis Bernard	Unopposed		
Registered electors		467		
Conservative hold				

By-election, 14 February 1842: Bandon
Party	Candidate	Votes	%	±%
Conservative	Francis Bernard	Unopposed		
Conservative hold				

- Caused by Jackson's appointment as Solicitor-General for Ireland

General election 1841: Bandon
Party	Candidate	Votes	%	±%
Conservative	Joseph Devonsher Jackson	Unopposed		
Registered electors		355		
Conservative hold				

=== Elections in the 1830s ===
General election 1837: Bandon
Party	Candidate	Votes	%	±%
Conservative	Joseph Devonsher Jackson	133	62.1	+3.7
Whig	William George Cavendish	81	37.9	−3.7
Majority		52	24.3	+7.5
Turnout		214	57.1	−7.7
Registered electors		375		
Conservative hold		Swing	+3.7	

General election 1835: Bandon
Party	Candidate	Votes	%	±%
Conservative	Joseph Devonsher Jackson	111	58.4	+1.3
Whig	James Redmond Barry	79	41.6	−1.3
Majority		32	16.8	+2.6
Turnout		190	64.8	−22.8
Registered electors		293		
Conservative hold		Swing	+1.3	

General election 1832: Bandon
Party	Candidate	Votes	%
Tory	William Smyth Bernard	133	57.1
Whig	Jacob Biggs	100	42.9
Majority		33	14.2
Turnout		233	87.6
Registered electors		266	
Tory hold			

By-election, 22 July 1831: Bandon
Party	Candidate	Votes	%
Whig	Augustus Clifford	5	45.5
Tory	William Lowther	4	36.4
Tory	Francis Bernard	2	18.2
Majority		1	9.1
Turnout		11	84.6
Registered electors		13	
Whig gain from Tory			

- Note [1831 (July)]: By-election caused by Bernard's resignation. Clifford was elected on the Returning Officer's casting vote. The Returning Officer John Swete was also Provost and had already cast one of the four votes for Clifford, so this was actually his second vote.

General election 1831: Bandon
Party	Candidate	Votes	%
Tory	Francis Bernard	Unopposed	
Registered electors		13	
Tory hold			

By-election, 6 January 1831: Bandon
Party	Candidate	Votes	%
Tory	Francis Bernard	Unopposed	
Registered electors		13	
Tory hold			

- Caused by Bernard's succession to the peerage, becoming 2nd Earl of Bandon

General election 1830: Bandon
Party	Candidate	Votes	%
Tory	James Bernard	Unopposed	
Registered electors		13	
Tory gain from Whig			

== Sources ==
- The Parliaments of England by Henry Stooks Smith (1st edition published in three volumes 1844–50), 2nd edition edited (in one volume) by F.W.S. Craig (Political Reference Publications 1973)
- Walker, Brian M., ed. (1978). Parliamentary Election Results in Ireland, 1801–1922. Dublin: Royal Irish Academy. ISBN 0901714127.
