= Augustus Clifford =

Royal Navy Admiral, court official and usher (1788–1877)

Admiral Sir Augustus Clifford Bt CB
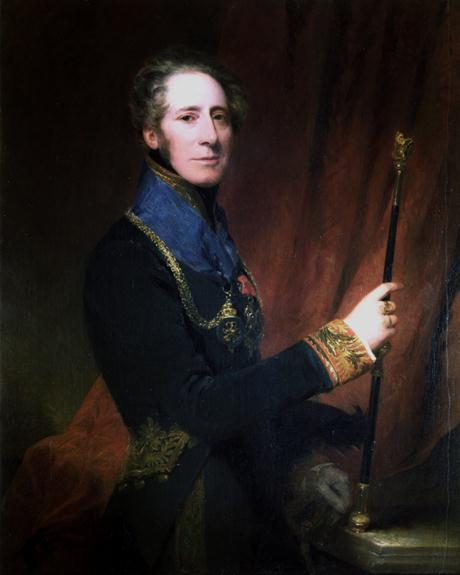

Gentleman Usher of the Black Rod
- In office 25 July 1832 – 8 February 1877
- Monarchs: William IV; Queen Victoria
- Preceded by: Sir Thomas Tyrwhitt
- Succeeded by: Sir William Knollys

Personal details
- Born: Augustus William James Clifford; 26 May 1788 France
- Died: 8 February 1877 (aged 88) Palace of Westminster, Westminster, London, England
- Spouse: Lady Elizabeth Frances Townshend (m. 1813; died 1862)
- Children: William John Cavendish Clifford
- Parent(s): William Cavendish, 5th Duke of Devonshire (father); Lady Elizabeth Foster (mother)
- Awards: Companion of the Order of the Bath; Knight Bachelor; Baronet

Military service
- Allegiance: United Kingdom
- Branch/service: Royal Navy
- Years of service: 1800–1866
- Rank: Admiral of the Red

Admiral Sir Augustus William James Clifford, 1st Baronet, CB (26 May 1788 – 8 February 1877) was a British Royal Navy officer, court official, and usher of the Black Rod.

== Personal life ==
Clifford was born in France in 1788, the illegitimate son of William Cavendish, 5th Duke of Devonshire (and 7th Baron Clifford) (1748–1811), and Lady Elizabeth Foster (1759–1824), daughter of Frederick Hervey, 4th Earl of Bristol. Not long after his birth, his mother brought him to England, to be wet-nursed by Louisa Augusta Marshall, wife of the Rev John Marshall, curate at Clewer, near Windsor, Berkshire. Clifford was educated at Harrow School, 1796–99. His parents married in 1809, their respective spouses having died.

He married, on 20 October 1813, Lady Elizabeth Frances Townshend (2 August 1789 – 10 April 1862 Nice), sister of John Townshend, 4th Marquess Townshend. Each of his sons, Capt William RN, Robert and Charles succeeded their father in turn as the second, third and fourth (and final) baronets.

Clifford was a patron of the arts, and formed a unique collection of paintings, sculpture, etchings, engravings, and bijouterie. He died at his residence in the House of Lords in 1877.

== Naval career ==
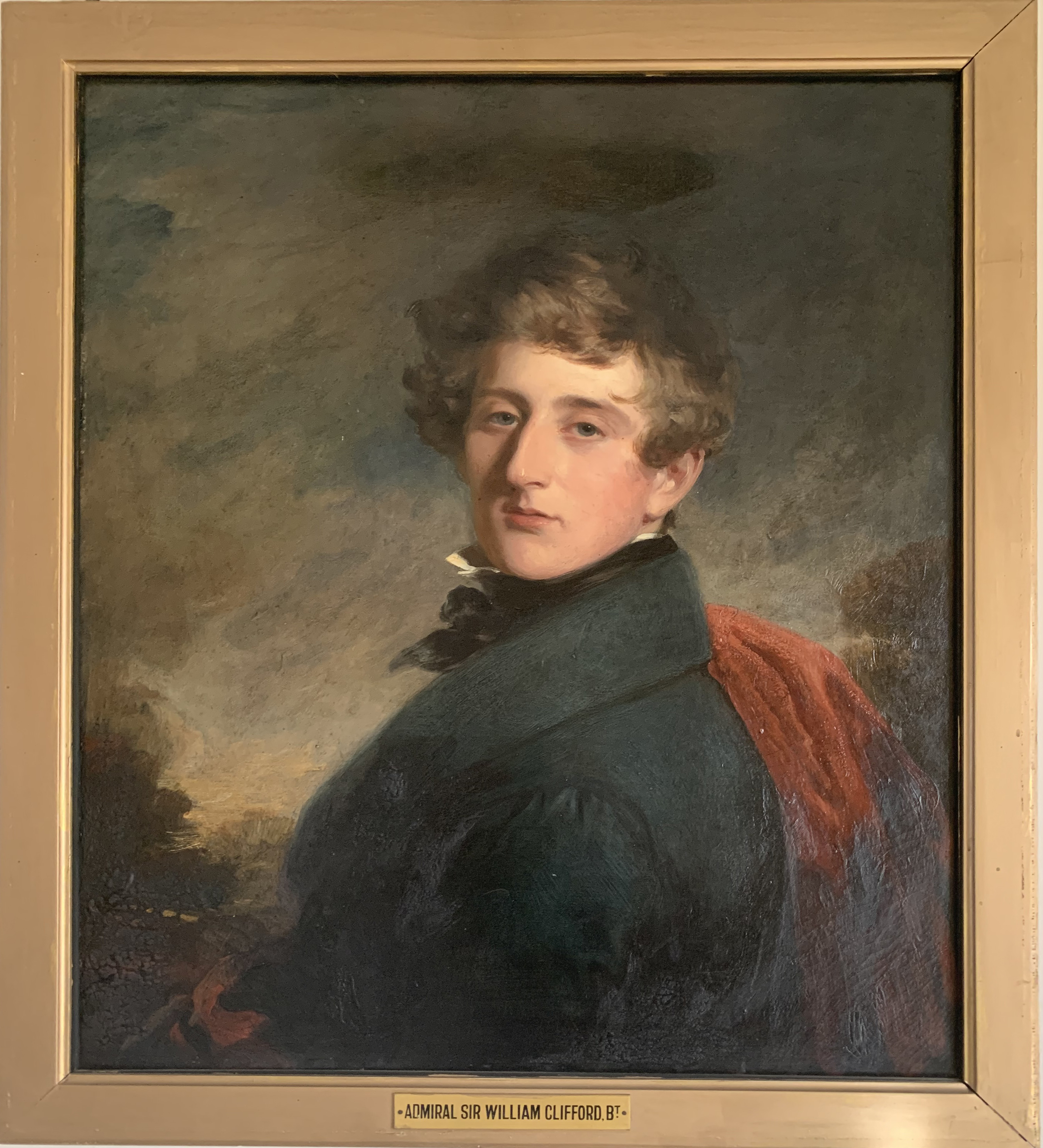
Admiral Sir William Clifford, Baronet

Clifford entered the Royal Navy as a midshipman in May 1800, and was promoted to a lieutenancy in 1806. He served at the reduction of Ste. Lucie and Tobago in 1803, and throughout the operations in Egypt during 1807. He was at the capture of a convoy in the Bay of Rosas in 1809 (for which he received a medal) and in the operations on the coast of Italy 1811–12.

After this, as captain, he was for many years actively employed in naval duties, being several times mentioned in the London Gazette for his courage in cutting-out expeditions and on other occasions. For some time he was engaged in attendance on the Lord High Admiral, the Duke of Clarence, afterwards William IV. Clifford recommissioned HMS Herald on 27 May 1826 to carry the Duke of Devonshire on an embassy to Russia. In 1828, in another vessel, Clifford took Lord William Bentinck out to India as governor-general. This was his last service afloat; he was not actively employed after 1831.

He reached the rank of rear-admiral 23 March 1848, vice-admiral 27 September 1855, admiral of the blue 7 November 1860, and admiral of the red 1864, becoming retired admiral 31 March 1866.

== Political career ==
He was Member of Parliament for Bandon 1818–20; for Dungarvan, 1820–2; and again for Bandon from 23 July 1831 to 3 Dec. 1832. He was nominated a Commander of the Order of the Bath on 8 December 1815, knighted on 4 August 1830, and created a baronet on 4 August 1838. His half-brother, the 6th Duke of Devonshire (then Lord Chamberlain), appointed him on 25 July 1832 Gentleman Usher of the Black Rod, which office he held, much to his satisfaction, until his death, 44 years later. On various occasions between 1843 and 1866 he acted as deputy lord great chamberlain of England, in the absence of Lord Willoughby d'Eresby.

== Ancestry ==
Ancestors of Augustus Clifford

16. William Cavendish, 2nd Duke of Devonshire
8. William Cavendish, 3rd Duke of Devonshire
17. Hon. Rachel Russell
4. William Cavendish, 4th Duke of Devonshire, Prime Minister of Great Britain
18. John Hoskins
9. Catherine Hoskins
19. Catherine Hale
2. William Cavendish, 5th Duke of Devonshire
20. Charles Boyle, 2nd Earl of Burlington
10. Richard Boyle, 3rd Earl of Burlington
21. Juliana Noel
5. Charlotte Boyle, 6th Baroness Clifford
22. William Savile, 2nd Marquess of Halifax
11. Lady Dorothy Savile
23. Lady Mary Finch
1. Adm. Sir Augustus Clifford, 1st Baronet, of the Navy
24. John Hervey, 1st Earl of Bristol
12. John Hervey, 2nd Baron Hervey
25. Elizabeth Felton
6. Frederick Hervey, 4th Earl of Bristol
26. Brig.-Gen. Nicholas Lepell
13. Mary Lepell
27. Mary Brooke
3. Lady Elizabeth Hervey
28. Sir Robert Davers, 2nd Baronet, of Rougham
14. Sir Jermyn Davers, 4th Baronet, of Rougham
29. The Hon. Mary Jermyn
7. Elizabeth Davers
30. Rev. Edward Green
15. Margaretta Green
31. Margaret

== See also ==
- Column of the Temple of Poseidon at Chatsworth

Parliament of the United Kingdom
Preceded by William Sturges Bourne	Member of Parliament for Bandon; 1818–1820	Succeeded by Viscount Bernard
Preceded by George Walpole	Member of Parliament for Dungarvan; 1820–1822	Succeeded by George Lamb
Preceded by Viscount Bernard	Member of Parliament for Bandon; 1831–1832	Succeeded by William Smyth Bernard
Government offices
Preceded by Sir Thomas Tyrwhitt	Black Rod; 1832–1877	Succeeded by Sir William Knollys
Baronetage of the United Kingdom
New title	Baronet of the Navy; 1838–1877	Succeeded by William, 2nd Baronet
