= George Allman (natural historian) =

Irish natural historian (1812-1898)

George James Allman FRS FRSE
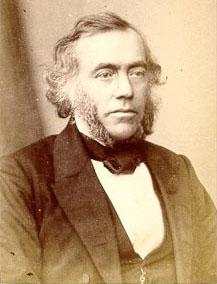
- George James Allman
- Born: 1812; Cork, Ireland
- Died: 24 November 1898 (aged 85–86); Parkstone, Poole, Dorset
- Education: Trinity College, Dublin
- Known for: Gymnoblast group of the hydrozoa
- Spouse: Hannah Louisa Shaen
- Children: None
- Awards: Royal Medal (1873); Linnean Medal (1896)
- Scientific career
- Fields: naturalist
- Author abbrev. (zoology): Allman, Allm.

George James Allman FRS FRSE (1812 – 24 November 1898) was an Irish ecologist, botanist and zoologist who served as Emeritus Professor of Natural History at Edinburgh University in Scotland.

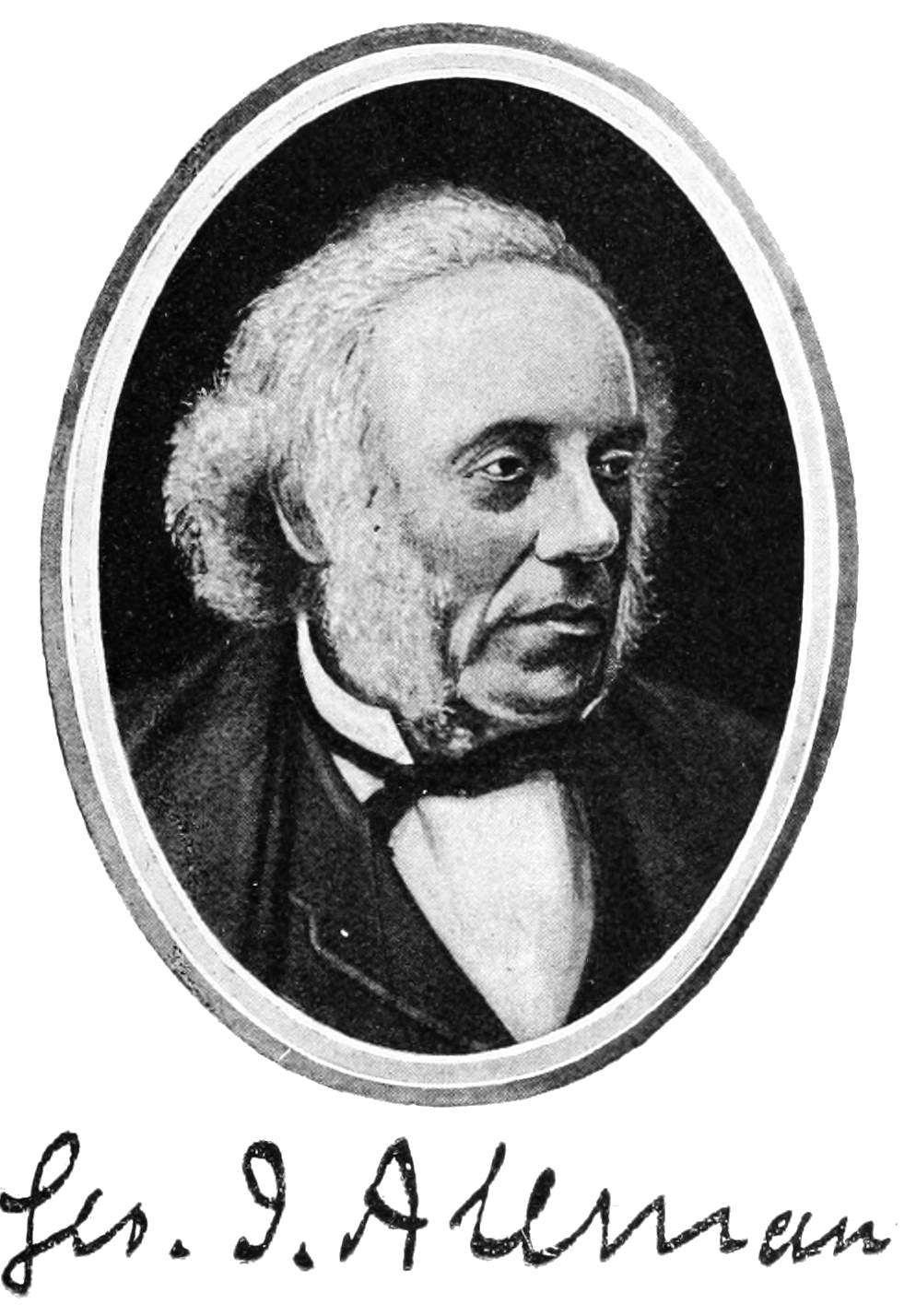
George James Allman and his signature.

== Life ==
Allman was born in Cork, Ireland, the son of James C. Allman of Bandon, and received his early education at the Royal Academical Institution, Belfast. For some time he studied for the Irish Bar, but ultimately gave up law in favour of natural science. In 1843, he graduated in medicine at Trinity College, Dublin, and in the following year was appointed professor of botany in that university, succeeding the botanist William Allman (1776–1846), who was the father of George Johnston Allman (distant relations of George).

This position he held for about twelve years until he moved to Edinburgh as Regius Professor of natural history. There he remained until 1870, when considerations of health induced him to resign his professorship and retire to Dorset, where he devoted himself to his favourite pastime of horticulture.

The scientific papers which came from his pen are very numerous. His most important work was upon the gymnoblast group of the hydrozoa, on which he published in 1871-1872, through the Ray Society, an exhaustive monograph, based largely on his own researches and illustrated with drawings of remarkable excellence from his own hand. Biological science is also indebted to him for several convenient terms which have come into daily use, e.g. endoderm and ectoderm for the two cellular layers of the body-wall in Coelenterata. He contributed articles to the Irish Naturalist.

He became a fellow of the Royal Society in 1854, and received a Royal medal in 1873. He received the Cunningham Medal of the Royal Irish Academy in 1878.

In 1859–60, he was President of the Botanical Society of Edinburgh, for several years (1874–1881) President of the Linnaean Society, and in 1879 presided over the Sheffield meeting of the British Association.

He died in Ardmore, Parkstone in Dorset and is buried in Poole Cemetery.

== Family ==
Allman married Hannah Louisa Shaen, daughter of Samuel and Rebecca Shaen of Crix, near Colchester, in 1849. They had no children. George Allman's family ran Allman's Bandon Distillery, his brother, the Liberal MP Richard Allman, was a partner in the Distillery.

== Select bibliography ==
- Allman G. J. 1843. On a new genus of terrestrial gasteropod. The Athenaeum 1843 (829): 851. London.
