= Henry Boyle Bernard =

Irish politician (1812–1895)

The Honourable Henry Boyle Bernard (6 February 1812 – 14 March 1895) was an Irish Conservative Party politician from County Cork who sat in the House of Commons from 1863 to 1868.

Bernard was the third son of James Bernard, 2nd Earl of Bandon (1785–1856) and his wife Mary Susan Albinia Brodrick.

He was appointed as the Colonel of the South Cork Light Infantry on 29 March 1854, and after his retirement was appointed its Honorary Colonel on 5 July 1876.

Bernard was elected at a by-election in February 1863 as the Member of Parliament (MP) for Bandon, filling the vacancy caused by the death of his uncle William Smyth Bernard (a son of the 1st Earl of Bandon).

He was re-elected in 1865, but at the 1868 general election he was defeated by the Liberal candidate William Shaw.

Parliament of the United Kingdom
Preceded by William Smyth Bernard	Member of Parliament for Bandon; 1863 – 1868	Succeeded by William Shaw
