= Percy Bernard =

Percy Bernard may refer to:

- Percy Bernard, 5th Earl of Bandon (1904–1979), Royal Air Force air marshal
- Percy Bernard (politician) (1844–1912), British politician
