= Governor Bernard =

Governor Bernard may refer to:

- Denis Bernard (British Army officer) (1882–1956), Governor of Bermuda from 1939 to 1941
- Sir Francis Bernard, 1st Baronet (1712–1779), 10th Governor of the Province of New Jersey from 1758 to 1760 and Governor of the Province of Massachusetts Bay from 1760 to 1769
