= William Smyth Bernard =

Irish politician

The Honourable William Smyth Bernard (13 September 1792 – 6 February 1863) was an Irish Conservative Party politician who sat in the House of Commons in two periods between 1832 and 1863.

Bernard was the son of Francis Bernard, 1st Earl of Bandon and his wife Lady Catherine Henrietta Boyle, daughter of Richard Boyle, 2nd Earl of Shannon. He became a captain in the 1st Dragoon Guards. At the 1832 general election Bernard was elected member of parliament (MP) for Bandon. He held the seat until 1835. He was re-elected for the seat in 1857 and retained it until his death in 1863, age 70.

Bernard married Elizabeth Gillman, daughter of Lt.-Col. Edward Gillman, of Clan Coole, co. Cork on 31 May 1831. There were no issue.

Parliament of the United Kingdom
Preceded by Augustus Clifford	Member of Parliament for Bandon; 1832 – 1835	Succeeded by Joseph Devonsher Jackson
Preceded by Viscount Bernard	Member of Parliament for Bandon; 1857 – 1863	Succeeded by Henry Boyle Bernard
