= Richard Allman =

Irish businessman and politician

Richard Lane Allman
- Born: 1813
- Died: 22 December 1904 (aged 90–91)
- Occupations: Irish businessman, House of Commons member of the United Kingdom from 1880–1885
- Known for: His participation as an Irish Liberal Party politician

Richard Lane Allman (1813 – 22 December 1904) was an Irish businessman from Bandon in County Cork. He was also an Irish Liberal Party politician who sat in the House of Commons from 1880 to 1885. His brother was the botanist and natural history professor George Allman.

== Early life ==
Allman was the son of James C. Allman and his wife Sarah née Lane.

The family were entrepreneurs in Bandon in the eighteenth and nineteenth centuries. Initially they ran a cotton mill at Overton, near Bandon, but when this declined they established Bandon Distillery in 1826.

== Business life ==
Allman's distillery produced up to 600,000 gallons of whiskey per year, which was mostly exported. However, trade was badly hit by prohibition in the United States and by the Great Depression. Production stopped in 1925, and the business closed in 1929.

== Parliament ==
At the general election in April 1880, Allman unsuccessfully contested the borough of Bandon. He lost by 15 votes (175:200) to the Conservative Percy Broderick Bernard, a nephew of the 3rd Earl of Bandon whose family had held the seat for most of the 19th century.

However, Bernard resigned from the House of Commons in June 1880, and at the resulting by-election on 25 June 1880, Allman was elected as the Member of Parliament (MP) for Bandon. He had won 217 votes, against the 172 for the Conservative J. W. Payne.

The borough was disenfranchised at the 1885 general election.

Parliament of the United Kingdom
Preceded by Percy Broderick Bernard	Member of Parliament for Bandon; 1880 – 1885	Constituency abolished
