= Castlehacket House =

- Caisleán an Haicéadaigh
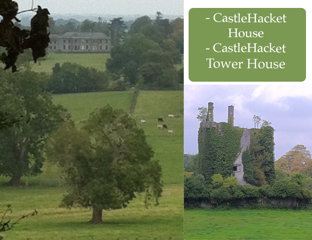
- Castlehacket House in January 2015

General information
- Status: Hotel
- Type: Country house
- Location: Castlehacket, County Galway, Ireland
- Coordinates: 53°29′44″N 8°58′7″W
- Completed: 18th century

Website
- castlehacket-house.com

Castlehacket House, constructed c. 1703-1760, is a historic country house situated across from Cnoc Meadha hill, between Caherlistrane and Belclare, County Galway. Succeeding the 13th century Castle Hackett tower house, Castlehacket served as the seat of the Kirwan family.

== History ==
=== Origins ===
The house is named for the Hiberno-Norman Hackett family, who previously owned the land on which the house sits, and who resided in Castle Hackett. Constructed in the mid-18th century, the house was in 1786 described as being the seat of Sir John Kirwan, Mayor of Galway. The Kirwan family acquired the castle through marriage with the Hacketts and subsequently built the manor house on a site near a natural spring.

=== Destruction and reconstruction ===
On 4 December 1923, the house was burned to the ground by anti-treaty IRA forces. Part of the destruction of Irish country houses seen during this period, the British government allocated £23,370 in compensation, used to reconstruct the house in the late 1920s. This process was overseen by Sir Denis "The General" Kirwan Bernard, former Governor of Bermuda and son of Percy Bernard, 5th Earl of Bandon and Mary Lissey Kirwan, who died at the home in 1956 and was buried atop Cnoc Meadha. The last Kirwan to inhabit Castlehacket was Percy Paley, who died in 1985.

While the original house was three storeys tall, the 1929 reconstruction resulted in a two-storey structure. The Georgian house features a North-facing eight-bay entrance, adjoining stables, as well as gardens and grazing land to the South.

=== Contemporary usage ===
The house was a filming location for the 2004 television series Foreign Exchange, serving as the fictional boarding school O'Keeffe's College. In 2016, the house was renovated and today operates as bed and breakfast accommodation. It is included in the Record of Protected Structures maintained by Galway County Council.

== See also ==
- Anglo-Irish big house
