= Robert Gordon-Finlayson =

British Army general

General Sir Robert Gordon-Finlayson KCB CMG DSO
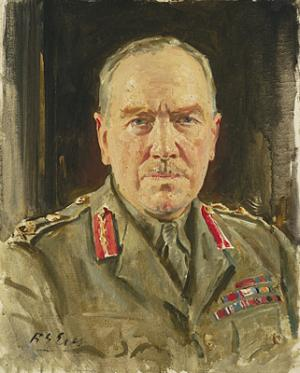
- Born: 15 April 1881
- Died: 23 May 1956 (aged 75)
- Military career
- Allegiance: United Kingdom
- Branch: British Army
- Service years: 1900–1941
- Rank: General
- Nickname: "Copper"
- Service number: 6755
- Unit: Royal Artillery
- Commands: Western Command (1940–1941); British Troops in Egypt (1938–1939); 3rd Division (1934–1936); Rawalpindi District (1931–1934)
- Conflicts: Second Boer War; First World War; Second World War
- Awards: Knight Commander of the Order of the Bath; Companion of the Order of St Michael and St George; Companion of the Distinguished Service Order

General Sir Robert Gordon-Finlayson, KCB, CMG, DSO (15 April 1881 – 23 May 1956) was a senior British military officer who was appointed Adjutant-General to the Forces in 1939.

== Military career ==
Finlayson entered the British Army from the Suffolk Militia and was commissioned into the Royal Artillery as second lieutenant on 17 March 1900. He was promoted to lieutenant on 3 April 1901, and was attached to 131 Battery of the Royal Artillery, stationed at Chatham. Seconded to serve with the Imperial Yeomanry during the Second Boer War in South Africa from 25 April 1902, he received the temporary rank of captain serving in the 24th battalion, Imperial Yeomanry. He vacated his appointment with the Imperial Yeomanry on 1 August 1902, and returned to the Royal Artillery.

Finlayson served during the First World War, initially as a Royal Artillery officer with 7th Division from 1914 and transferring to 3rd Division in 1915. He was appointed a Companion of the Distinguished Service Order in 1915. He became Deputy Assistant Adjutant General, 1 Army Corps in 1916 and then General Staff Officer to a Special Mission to Russia in 1917.

After the war Finlayson was Deputy Commander, North Russia Forces, a post he held from 1918 to 1919. He then became an instructor at the Senior Officer School in 1919 before attending the Staff College, Camberley and being appointed Military Assistant to Chief of the Imperial General Staff in 1921. He went on to be a General Staff Officer at the War Office in 1922 and joined the Staff College in 1925.

Finlayson was appointed Commander Royal Artillery in the 3rd Division in 1927, was promoted to major general on 9 November 1930, and made commander Rawalpindi District in India in 1931. He served with the 3rd Division again between 1934 and 1936 – this time as General Officer Commanding. He was promoted to general in 1937 and was appointed General Officer Commanding-in-Chief the British Troops in Egypt in 1938.

Finlayson also served in the Second World War, being appointed Adjutant General in 1939. In this role he was responsible for organising the Home Guard to defend the United Kingdom in the face of invasion. He was also responsible for the Army Council introducing a colour bar, whereby only those of pure European ancestry could be commissioned as officers. He became General Officer Commanding-in-Chief, Western Command in 1940, from which post retired in 1941.

Finlayson was Aide-de-Camp General to the King from 1940 to 1941. He was also Colonel Commandant of the Royal Artillery from 1936 to 1946 and Colonel Commandant of the Royal Horse Artillery from 1937 to 1947.

Finlayson was appointed a Companion of St Michael and St George in 1918, a Companion of the Order of the Bath in 1931 and a Knight Commander of the Order of the Bath in 1937.

== Retirement ==
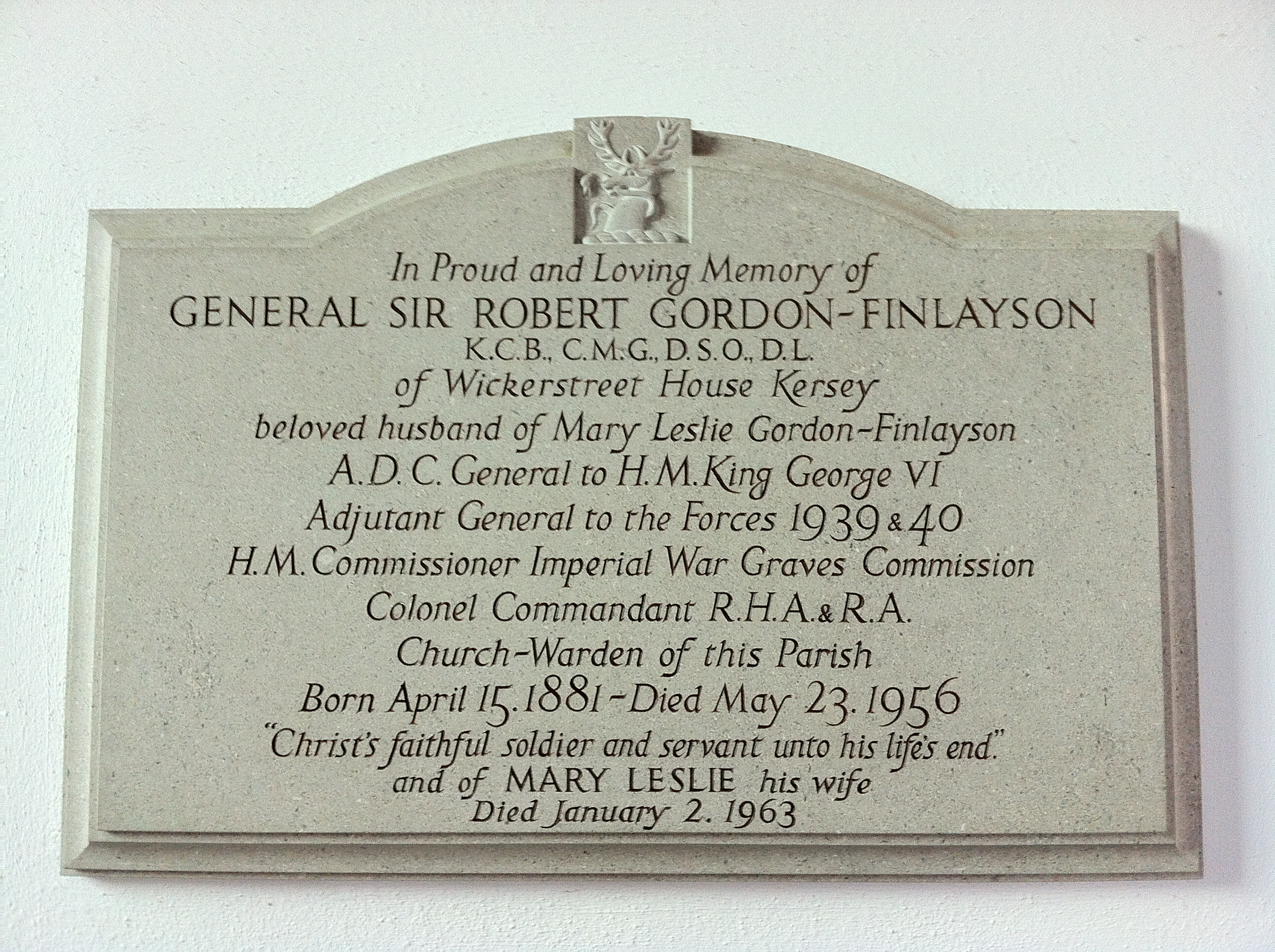
Memorial to Robert Gordon-Finlayson in St Mary's Church, Kersey, Suffolk.

In retirement Finlayson was appointed a Special Commissioner for the Imperial War Graves Commission in 1942 and of the Duke of York's Royal Military School, also in 1942. He was a Deputy Lieutenant for Suffolk, and lived in Kersey.

Finlayson was churchwarden of St Mary's Church, Kersey and a memorial was erected in his memory in the church.

== Family ==
Finlayson was married to Mary Leslie Richmond and together they had two sons, Air Vice Marshal James Richmond Gordon-Finlayson, Major-General Robert Gordon-Finlayson and a daughter, Mary Leslie, who married to become Mary Boyle, Countess of Cork.

== Bibliography ==
- Smart, Nick (2005). Biographical Dictionary of British Generals of the Second World War. Barnsley, South Yorkshire: Pen and Sword Books. ISBN 1844150496.

Military offices
Preceded by Walter Pitt-Taylor	GOC 3rd Division; 1934–1936	Succeeded by Cecil Heywood
Preceded by Sir George Weir	GOC-in-C British Troops in Egypt; 1938–1939	Succeeded by Sir Henry Maitland Wilson
Preceded by Sir Clive Liddell	Adjutant General; 1939–1940	Succeeded by Sir Colville Wemyss
Preceded by Sir Henry Jackson	GOC-in-C Western Command; 1940–1941	Succeeded by Sir James Marshall-Cornwall
