= William Allman =

Irish professor of botany (1776–1846)

- Born: 7 February 1776; Kingston, Jamaica
- Died: 8 December 1846 (aged 70); Dublin, Ireland
- Education: Trinity College, Dublin
- Known for: Botany

William Allman, M.D. (1776–1846) was Professor of Botany at Trinity College Dublin.

== Life ==
He was born at Kingston, Jamaica, on 7 February 1776, but his parents removed to Ireland before he was four years of age, his mother being a native of Waterford. His father, Thomas, was described as a "gentleman". He was educated in Waterford, and Trinity College Dublin, where he was elected a Scholar, and graduated B.A. in 1796, M.A. in 1801, and M.D. in 1804. He practised medicine in Clonmel until 1809 when he was elected Professor of Botany at Trinity College Dublin. Soon after this event he became acquainted with Robert Brown, the botanist, with whom his friendship was lifelong. Allman arranged lectures in 1812 on the natural system, the first botanical professor in the UK and Ireland to use this system. Brown named the Amaranthaceous genus Allmania in Allman's honour in 1832.

He held the chair of botany until 1844 when he was succeeded by George James Allman (they were not related). He died on 8 December 1846.

In addition to the two mathematical papers mentioned in the 'Catalogue of Scientific Papers', he wrote 'On the Mathematical Relations of the Forms of the Cells of Plants', in the 'British Association Report' for 1835, erroneously attributed in the above-mentioned catalogue to his successor. He was also the author of an 'arrangement of plants' according to their natural affinities, which was read before the British Association at Dublin in 1835, and printed in its 'Proceedings'. This was afterwards more developed and issued under the title 'Familiæ Plantarum', Dublin, 1836, as a textbook for his classes.

His best-known work is a thin quarto entitled Analysis per differentias constantes viginti, inchoata, generum plantarum quæ in Britanniis, Gallia, Helvetia . . . sponte sua crescunt, (1828). In 1844 he privately brought out an abstract of a memoir read in 1811 before the Royal Society, but not printed, on the mathematical connection between the external organs of plants and their internal structure.

Allman married Anne (died 1831) in 1814. They had two sons, George, a mathematician, classical scholar, and historian of ancient Greek mathematics, and William Allman (1819–95), rector of Kilmacrenan, County Donegal.
