= James Bernard, 2nd Earl of Bandon =

Irish politician

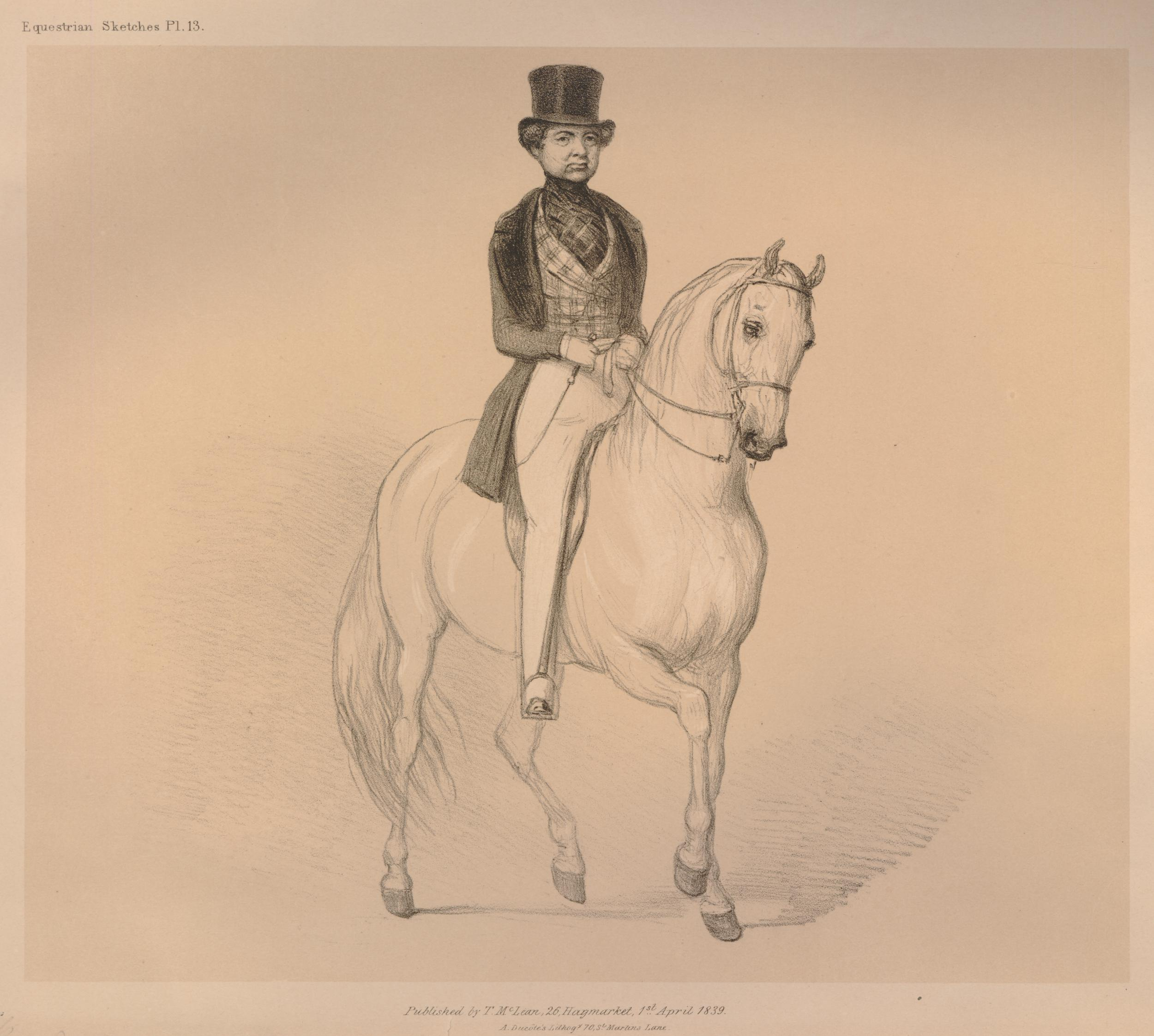
James Bernard, 2nd Earl of Bandon (1839 lithograph by John Doyle

James Bernard, 2nd Earl of Bandon (14 June 1785 – 31 October 1856) was an Irish Conservative politician who sat in the House of Commons in three periods between 1806 and 1831 and in the House of Lords as an Irish representative peer from 1835 until his death.

Bernard was the son of Francis Bernard, 1st Earl of Bandon and his wife Lady Catherine Henrietta Boyle, daughter of Richard Boyle, 2nd Earl of Shannon. He was educated at St John's College, Cambridge.

Bernard died at Castle Bernard the age of 71.

Bernard married Mary Susan Albinia Brodrick, daughter of Rev. the Hon. Charles Brodrick, Archbishop of Cashel, at St. John's Cathedral, Cashel on 13 March 1809. He was succeeded by his son Francis.

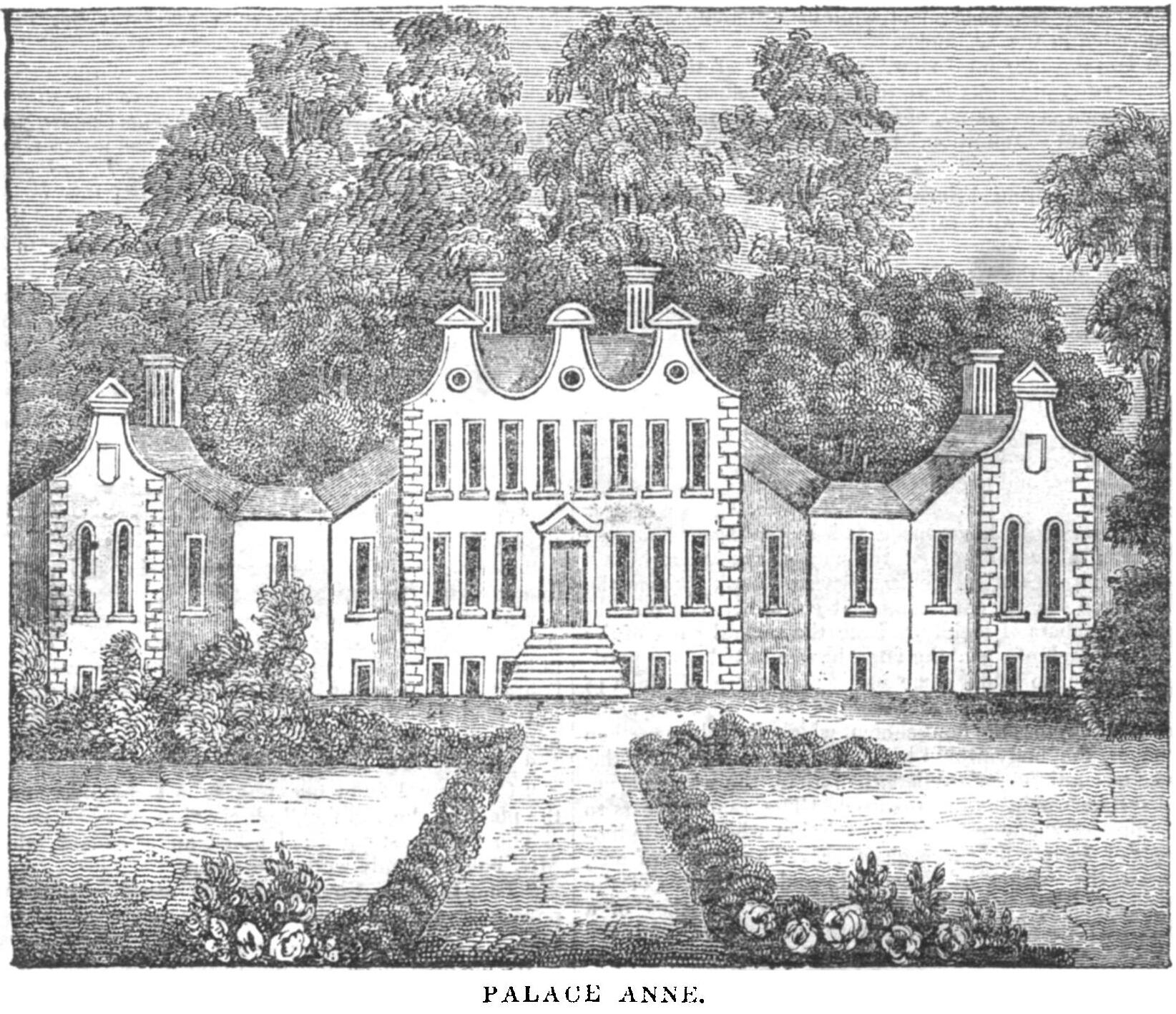
Bandon's house, Palace Anne in 1834, at Palaceanne, County Cork

Parliament of the United Kingdom
Preceded by Sir John Keane, Bt	Member of Parliament for Youghal; 1806–1807	Succeeded by Henry Boyle, Viscount Boyle
Preceded by Henry Boyle, Viscount Boyle; George Ponsonby	Member of Parliament for County Cork; 1807–1812; With: George Ponsonby; Viscount Ennismore	Succeeded by Viscount Ennismore; Viscount Kingsborough
Preceded by Sir John Keane, Bt	Member of Parliament for Youghal; 1818–1820	Succeeded by John Hyde
Preceded by Augustus Clifford	Member of Parliament for Bandon; 1820–1826	Succeeded by Viscount Duncannon
Preceded by Lord John Russell	Member of Parliament for Bandon; 1830–1831	Succeeded by Viscount Bernard
Peerage of Ireland
Preceded by Francis Bernard	Earl of Bandon; 1830–1856	Succeeded by Francis Bernard
Political offices
Preceded by The Earl of Longford	Representative peer for Ireland; 1835–1856	Succeeded by The Earl Belmore
