= William Shaw (Irish politician) =

Irish Protestant nationalist politician

Chairman of the Home Rule League
- In office April 1880 – May 1879
- Preceded by: Isaac Butt
- Succeeded by: Charles Stewart Parnell

Member of Parliament for County Cork
- In office 1874–1885
- Preceded by: Henry Boyle Bernard
- Succeeded by: Constituency abolished

Member of Parliament for Bandon
- In office 1868–1874
- Preceded by: McCarthy Downing and Arthur Smith-Barry
- Succeeded by: Alexander Swanston

Personal details
- Born: 4 May 1823 Moy, County Tyrone
- Died: 19 September 1895 (aged 72) Enniskerry, County Wicklow

William Shaw (4 May 1823 – 19 September 1895) was an Irish Protestant nationalist politician. He was a Member of Parliament (MP) in the House of Commons of the United Kingdom of Great Britain and Ireland and one of the founders of the Irish home rule movement.

== Biography ==
Born in Moy, County Tyrone, Shaw was connected with the Young Ireland movement, and studied at Trinity College Dublin without taking a degree. He then studied theology at Highbury College in Middlesex. He served as a Minister at an independent church in Cork from 1846 to 1850, then married and left his post to move into business.

Shaw stood as a Liberal Party candidate in Bandon, at the 1865 by-election and subsequent general election, but was defeated on both occasions. He stood in the same seat at the 1868 general election, and was elected as an independent Liberal. While generally supportive of William Ewart Gladstone, he became active in the new Home Government Association, and in 1873, he presided over the convention held to found its successor, the Home Rule League.

At the 1874 general election, Shaw was elected unopposed for County Cork, and with Mitchell Henry, often deputised for Home Rule Party leader Isaac Butt. He remained loyal to Butt, and when Butt died in 1879, Shaw was selected as the new party chairman.

Shaw held his seat at the 1880 general election, but lost an election for the party chairmanship, to Charles Stewart Parnell. Parnell distanced the Home Rule League from the Liberal Party, but Shaw continued to sit on the Liberal benches in the House of Commons, and was appointed to the Bessborough Commission to examine Irish land tenure. Shaw opposed the Irish Land League, formally left the Irish party group in early 1881, and resigned from the moribund Home Rule League in December.

Shaw devoted increasing amounts of his time to his chairmanship of the Munster Bank, and did not stand for Parliament at the 1885 general election. Later in the year, the Munster Bank collapsed, and Shaw was declared personally bankrupt. He moved to London and worked with various newspapers in the last years of his life.

Shaw died on 19 September 1895 in Enniskerry, County Wicklow. He died from Cardiac Failure aged 72.

Parliament of the United Kingdom
Preceded by Henry Boyle Bernard	Member of Parliament for Bandon; 1868–1874	Succeeded by Alexander Swanston
Preceded by McCarthy Downing and Arthur Smith-Barry	Member of Parliament for County Cork; 1874–1885; With: McCarthy Downing, to 1879; David la Touche Colthurst, from 1879	Constituency abolished
