= Percy Bernard (politician) =

Irish politician

Percy Brodrick Bernard (17 September 1844 – 18 July 1912) was an Irish Conservative Party politician who sat briefly in the House of Commons in 1880.

Bernard was the son of Charles Brodrick Bernard, Bishop of Tuam, and his wife, Hon. Jane Grace Dorothea Freke, sister of George Evans-Freke, 7th Baron Carbery. He was a nephew of Francis Bernard, 3rd Earl of Bandon.

In 1866, Bernard was commissioned as an officer in the South Cork Light Infantry Militia.

Bernard was elected as a Member of Parliament for Bandon in April 1880. He resigned in June 1880 by becoming Steward of the Manor of Northstead.

Bernard lived at Freckenham, Suffolk, and died at the age of 67.

Bernard married firstly Isabel Emma Beatrice Lane in April 1872. His second wife whom he married in February 1880 was Mary Lissey Kirwan who inherited the 8,374-acre (33.89 km^{2}) estate of Castlehacket. He married a third time in June 1900 to Evangeline Hoare, daughter of Henry Hoare (1838–1898) of Staplehurst. His son General Sir Denis Bernard was Governor of Bermuda. After his death, she married Charles Hedley Strutt (MP).

Parliament of the United Kingdom
| Preceded by Alexander Swanston | Member of Parliament for Bandon; 1880–1880 | Succeeded by Richard Lane Allman |
