= Alexander Swanston =

Irish politician (1808–1882)

Alexander Swanston MP

Member of Parliament for Bandon
- In office 9 February 1874 – 13 April 1880
- Preceded by: William Shaw
- Succeeded by: Percy Bernard

Personal details
- Born: 1808
- Died: 24 June 1882 (aged 73)
- Party: Liberal

Alexander Swanston (1808 – 24 June 1882) was an Irish Liberal politician.

He was elected as the Member of Parliament (MP) for Bandon at the 1874 general election but stood down at the next election in 1880.

Parliament of the United Kingdom
Preceded by William Shaw	Member of Parliament for Bandon; 1874 – 1880	Succeeded by Percy Bernard
