= Joseph Devonsher Jackson =

Irish Conservative MP

Joseph Devonsher Jackson PC (23 June 1783 – 19 December 1857) was an Irish Conservative MP in the United Kingdom Parliament and subsequently a High Court Judge.

== Early career ==
He was the eldest son of Strettell Jackson of Peterborough, County Cork, a carrier by trade, and Mary Cossens. He went to a private school run by a local clergyman. He attended Trinity College Dublin, where he received the top honours every year, and attended the Middle Temple, before being called to the Irish Bar in 1806. He built up a lucrative legal practice, and was able to pay off his father's debts when the family business failed. He was briefly involved in the linen manufacturing business run by his wife's brother Mr. Clarke, but he had little talent for the trade. As a young man, he was a passionate and evangelical Protestant, active in attempting to convert Roman Catholics to his own faith; but as a judge, he was notably free of religious bias, despite the Queen's fears that he would prove to be a bigoted Orangeman.

== Politician and judge ==
He was appointed the King's Second Serjeant for Ireland in 1835, and remained the Queen's Second Serjeant until 1841, although ironically his continuance in the office was against the expressed wishes of Queen Victoria, who was concerned about his strong religious beliefs. He held the office of Chairman of County Londonderry Quarter Sessions, which he resigned to seek election to Parliament.

He was MP for Bandon from 1835 to 1841. He was a member of the Commons Select Committee on Banking in 1840. On 10 November 1841 he was appointed Solicitor-General for Ireland. The Government greatly relied on his advice concerning Irish affairs. He was also made a member of the Privy Council of Ireland. This preferment had the effect of vacating his Parliamentary seat.

Instead of seeking re-election in Bandon, Jackson stood for Dublin University. He represented that seat between 11 February 1842 and 9 September 1842. He was then appointed a Judge of the Court of Common Pleas (Ireland) 1842–1848. He resigned his Parliamentary seat by accepting the Chiltern Hundreds, so he could take up the judicial post. As a judge, he was noted for compassion in criminal cases.

== Personal life ==
Jackson was described as a "temperate" politician, but he was a reliable supporter of the Protestant monarchy, constitution and church as well as the Union between Great Britain and Ireland, and a staunch opponent of Daniel O'Connell (who nicknamed him "Leather Lungs", due to his almost interminable speeches). He lived at Sutton Castle, Howth, County Dublin, and also had an estate at Knockalisheen, County Cork, which was the subject of litigation after his death.

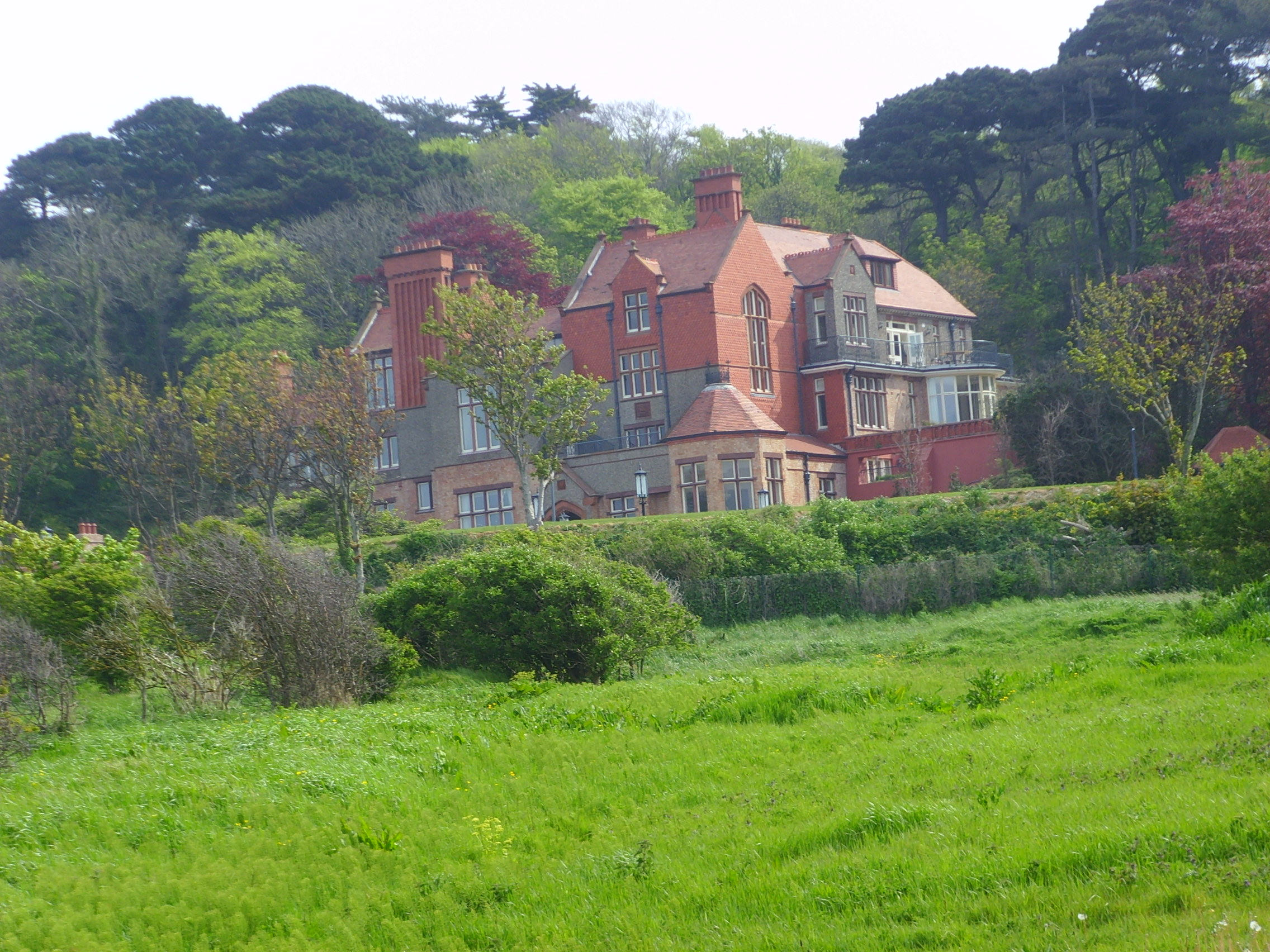
Sutton Castle

He married in 1811 Sarah Lucinda Clarke, ninth daughter of Benjamin Clarke of Cullenswood, County Dublin and Mary Read, but the couple had no children. His widow died on 30 November 1858. On his death, his estate was divided between his four sisters.

He is buried at St. Fintan's Cemetery, Sutton.

== Notes ==
Parliament of the United Kingdom
Preceded by Hon. William Smyth Bernard	Member of Parliament for Bandon; 1835–1842	Succeeded by Viscount Bandon
Preceded by Thomas Langlois Lefroy; Sir Frederick Shaw, Bt	Member of Parliament for Dublin University; February–September 1842; With: Sir Frederick Shaw, Bt	Succeeded by George Alexander Hamilton; Sir Frederick Shaw, Bt
Legal offices
Preceded by Edward Pennefather	Solicitor-General for Ireland; 1841–1842	Succeeded by Thomas Cusack-Smith
