= James Bernard (politician) =

Irish politician (1729–1790)

James Bernard (8 December 1729 – 7 July 1790) was an Irish politician and ancestor of the Earls of Bandon.

He was the son of Major North Ludlow Bernard and his first wife Rose Echlin, daughter of John Echlin of Ardquin, County Down, and niece of Sir Henry Echlin, 1st Baronet. He was the grandson of Francis Bernard, Solicitor-General for Ireland, Member of Parliament and judge of the Court of Common Pleas (Ireland), and his wife Alice Ludlow. Bernard represented County Cork in the Irish House of Commons from 1781 until his death in 1790.

He married Esther Smyth, youngest daughter of Percy Smyth of Headborough, son of Sir Percy Smyth of Ballynatray, County Waterford, and his wife Elizabeth Jervois, and widow of Robert Gookin of Courtmacsherry, County Cork. They had five daughters and a son, Francis, who was elevated to the Peerage of Ireland as Earl of Bandon. His main residence was Castle Bernard near Bandon, which he inherited from his uncle Francis. It was destroyed during the Irish War of Independence.

Parliament of Ireland
Preceded by Richard Townsend; Sir Robert Deane, 6th Bt	Member of Parliament for County Cork; 1781–1790; With: Richard Townsend 1781–1783; Robert King, Viscount Kingsborough 1783–1790	Succeeded by Robert King, Viscount Kingsborough; Abraham Morris
