= Colville Wemyss =

British Army officer (1891–1959)

General Sir Colville Wemyss KCB KBE DSO MC
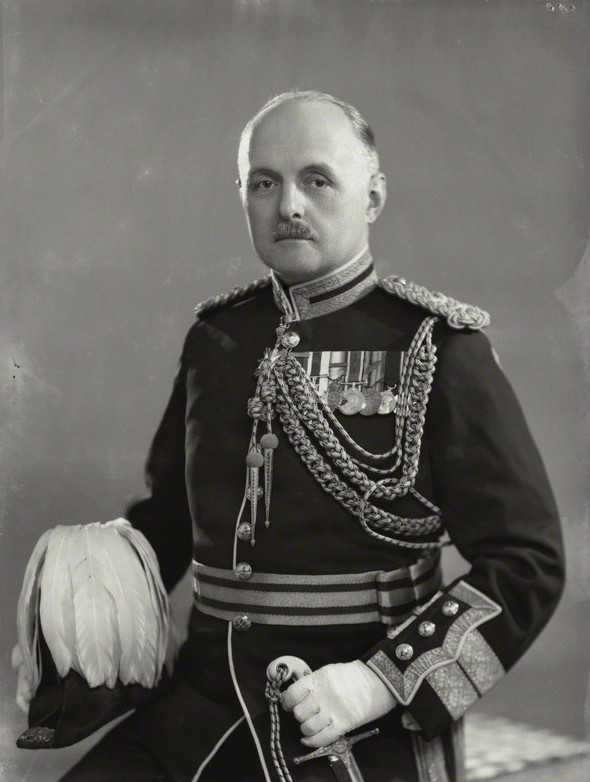
- Wemyss in 1939
- Born: Henry Colville Barclay Wemyss; 26 April 1891; Mauritius
- Died: 2 April 1959 (aged 67)
- Military career
- Allegiance: United Kingdom
- Branch: British Army
- Service years: 1910–1946
- Rank: General
- Service number: 14202
- Units: Royal Engineers; Royal Corps of Signals
- Commands: 5th Divisional Signals (1933–1935)
- Conflicts: First World War; Second World War
- Awards: Knight Commander of the Order of the Bath; Knight Commander of the Order of the British Empire; Distinguished Service Order; Military Cross; Mentioned in Despatches; Commander of the Legion of Merit (United States); Commander of the Order of the Nile (Kingdom of Egypt)

General Sir Henry Colville Barclay Wemyss, KCB, KBE, DSO, MC (26 April 1891 – 2 April 1959) was a senior British Army officer who served as Adjutant-General to the Forces from 1940 to 1941.

== Military career ==
Colville Wemyss (pronounced weems) was born the son of Alexander Wemyss, he was educated at Bedford School and the Royal Military Academy, Woolwich, he was commissioned into the Royal Engineers in December 1910.

As with so many other young men of his generation, he served in the First World War, being awarded the Distinguished Service Order and Military Cross. He was promoted to brevet major in June 1918.

In 1920 he transferred to the newly formed Royal Corps of Signals. After attending the Staff College, Camberley from 1923 to 1924, in 1926 he became a General Staff Officer at the War Office and then in 1929 he was appointed an instructor at the School of Signals at Catterick. He left the School of Signals in 1932 to become a GSO at Northern Command at York.

On 1 October 1935 Wemyss was promoted colonel and appointed an Assistant Adjutant General at the War Office in London. He was a student at the Imperial Defence College between 18 January 1938 and January 1939. On completing the course, he was promoted to major general and appointed as the Director of Mobilisation at the War Office on 9 January 1939. On 19 February 1940 he transferred to the post of Deputy Adjutant General to the Forces at the War Office.

On 10 June 1940, nine months after the outbreak of the Second World War, Wemyss replaced General Robert Gordon-Finlayson as Adjutant-General to the Forces. He was promoted Acting lieutenant general on assuming the role. The increasing importance of the role of the United States in the Second World War led to United Kingdom government establishing a military mission to Washington, D.C. On 3 June 1941 Wemyss was appointed the Head of the British Army Mission to Washington. In January 1942, Prime Minister Winston Churchill decided to replace Wemyss in Washington with General Sir John Dill so Wemyss returned to the United Kingdom. Wemyss was appointed Military Secretary to the Secretary of State for War on 16 June 1942. He was to remain in this key post for the rest of the war. He was promoted general on 15 October 1945, by which time the war was over, and retired from the army, after having served for almost exactly thirty-six years of service, on 23 November 1946.

Wemyss was appointed a Companion of the Order of the Bath on 11 July 1940 and advanced to Knight Commander of the Order of the Bath on 14 June 1945. He was also made a Knight Commander of the Order of the British Empire on 1 July 1941. In recognition of his links to the United States, on 23 July 1948, he was also awarded the Legion of Merit in the degree of commander.

== Bibliography ==
- Smart, Nick (2005). Biographical Dictionary of British Generals of the Second World War. Barnsley, U.K.: Pen & Sword Military. ISBN 1-84415-049-6.

Military offices
Preceded by Sir Robert Gordon-Finlayson	Adjutant General; 1940–1941	Succeeded by Sir Ronald Adam
Preceded by Arthur Floyer-Acland	Military Secretary; 1942–1946	Succeeded by Sir Frederick Browning
