= Richard Bernard (Dean of Leighlin) =

Richard Boyle Bernard (4 September 1787 – 2 March 1850) was an MP and Dean of Leighlin in the 19th century.

Bernard was educated at St John's College, Cambridge and ordained in 1815. He became Rector of Glenkeen in 1820; and Dean of Leighlin in 1822. He was MP for Bandon Bridge from 1812 to 1815.

Parliament of the United Kingdom
Preceded by George Tierney	Member of Parliament for Bandon; 1812 – 1815	Succeeded by William Sturges Bourne
