= Cecil Heywood =

British Army officer

Major-General Cecil Heywood CB CMG DSO
- Born: 17 May 1880; Duffield, Derbyshire, England
- Died: 20 October 1936 (aged 56)
- Military career
- Allegiance: United Kingdom
- Branch: British Army
- Service years: 1899–1936
- Rank: Major-General
- Unit: Coldstream Guards
- Commands: 3rd Guards Brigade; Coldstream Guards and Regimental District; 3rd Division
- Conflicts: Second Boer War; First World War; Russian Civil War
- Awards: Companion of the Order of the Bath; Companion of the Order of St Michael and St George; Distinguished Service Order

Major-General Cecil Percival Heywood CB CMG DSO (17 May 1880 – 20 October 1936) was a British Army officer who commanded 3rd Division.

== Military career ==
Born the second son of Sir Arthur Heywood, 3rd Baronet, Heywood was commissioned into the Coldstream Guards as a second-lieutenant on 12 August 1899. He fought in the Second Boer War, leaving Southampton for South Africa on the SS Canada in early February 1900. Following the war, he became adjutant of the 2nd Battalion, Coldstream Guards in 1904 before undertaking a tour with the Egyptian Army which involved him in operations in Southern Kurdufan in Sudan in 1908. In June 1910 he was seconded for service on the staff and appointed an aide-de-camp to Major General Sir Henry Rawlinson, who had just taken command of the 3rd Division.

He served in the First World War, initially as a brigade major before becoming a general staff officer, grade 2 in May 1915. He was promoted in September 1915 to major and was later a General Staff Officer before becoming Commander of 3rd Guards Brigade in 1918. He was wounded by shellfire in the war's final days. In the following year he served as a staff officer in the Russian Civil War.

He was appointed Commander of the Coldstream Guards and Regimental District in 1927, Director of Military Training in India in 1930 and Director of Staff Duties at the War Office in 1934. He was, on 28 April 1936, made Major General Robert Gordon-Finlayson's successor as general officer commanding (GOC) of the 3rd Division although his tenure was brief before retiring from the army.

He is buried in All Saint's Churchyard at Denstone in Staffordshire.

== Family ==
In 1917 he married Margaret Vere Kerr; they had a son and a daughter.

== Bibliography ==
- Davies, Frank (1997). Bloody Red Tabs: General Officer Casualties of the Great War 1914–1918. London: Pen & Sword Books. ISBN 9781783462377.

Military offices
Preceded by Robert Gordon-Finlayson	GOC 3rd Division; 1936	Succeeded by Denis Bernard
