= Percy Bernard, 5th Earl of Bandon =

Royal Air Force Air Chief Marshal (1904-1979)

Air Chief Marshal The Right Honourable The Earl of Bandon GBE CB CVO DSO
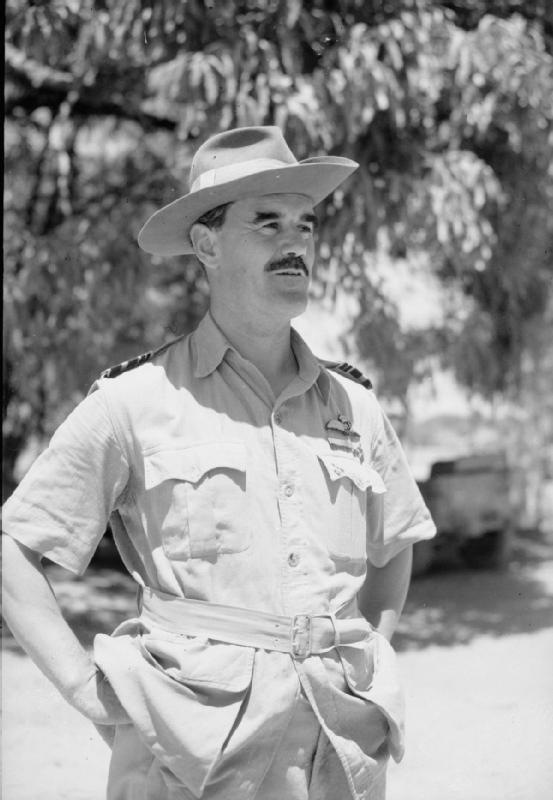
- Air Vice Marshal the Earl of Bandon, Air Officer Commanding No. 224 Group at his Headquarters at Akyab, Burma.
- Born: 30 August 1904; Gillingham, England
- Died: 8 February 1979 (aged 74); Bon Secours Hospital, Cork, Ireland
- Military career
- Allegiance: United Kingdom
- Branch: Royal Air Force
- Service years: 1922–64
- Rank: Air Chief Marshal
- Nickname: Paddy
- Commands: Allied Air Forces Central Europe (1961–63); Far East Air Force (1957–60); Second Tactical Air Force (1956–57); No. 11 Group (1951–53); No. 2 Group (1950–51); Royal Observer Corps (1945–49); No. 224 Group (1944–45); RAF Horsham St Faith (1942); RAF West Raynham (1941); RAF Watton (1940–41); No. 82 Squadron (1940)
- Conflicts: Second World War: Operation Dracula
- Awards: Knight Grand Cross of the Order of the British Empire; Companion of the Order of the Bath; Commander of the Royal Victorian Order; Distinguished Service Order; Mentioned in Despatches (3); Distinguished Flying Cross (United States); Bronze Star Medal (United States)

Air Chief Marshal Percy Ronald Gardner Bernard, 5th Earl of Bandon, GBE, CB, CVO, DSO (30 August 1904 – 8 February 1979) was an Anglo-Irish aristocrat who served as a senior commander in the Royal Air Force in the mid-20th century. He was a squadron, station and group commander during the Second World War, and the fifth Commandant of the Royal Observer Corps after the war. He was awarded the American Distinguished Flying Cross and Bronze Star Medal in 1946.

== Early life ==
Born in Gillingham, Kent, Bernard was the elder of twin boys by twenty minutes and the son of Lieutenant Colonel Ronald Percy Hamilton Bernard and Lettice Mina Paget. His mother was the daughter of Captain Gerald Cecil Stewart Paget, son of Lord Alfred Paget, younger son of Henry Paget, 1st Marquess of Anglesey. On his father's side he was a great-grandson of the Right Reverend Hon. Charles Bernard, Bishop of Tuam, younger son of James Bernard, 2nd Earl of Bandon. His family resided in a house on the Theobald's Park estate in Hertfordshire where the eccentric horse breeder and owner Lady Meux had loaned his parents a house.

In the summer of 1914 he and his twin brother were sent to St. Aubyns Preparatory School at Rottingdean, and four years later both boys entered the Orange dormitory at Wellington College where Percy was continually referred to as Bernard Minor incorrectly throughout his time at Wellington College. Having studied for and passing the entrance examination he entered the Royal Air Force College at Cranwell in Lincolnshire in 1922.

== Earldom ==
In 1924, whilst still a cadet in B Squadron at Cranwell, Bernard succeeded his first cousin twice removed, James Bernard, 4th Earl of Bandon, as 5th Earl of Bandon. This was an Irish peerage and did not entitle him to a seat in the House of Lords. There was also little money attached to his inheritance and the main element, Castle Bernard outside Bandon and eighteen miles south west of Cork, was derelict after being burned down by the IRA four years earlier in 1920. The new Earl eventually received £123,000 (£4.7 million in today's terms) compensation for the damage to the family seat, which remains a ruin. The earl built a modern and modestly sized mansion alongside the castle ruins.

Although the British Army and the Royal Navy have always had a significant number of peers within their ranks the new Earl of Bandon was almost unique within the RAF. Known to one and all by the familial name of "Paddy" Bandon he developed a devilish sense of humour and was involved in many scrapes with superior officers during his career. There were a number of anecdotes told about the Earl, perhaps the most repeated was the occasion that he and several of his fellow pilots wearing grubby and dishevelled flight dress, straight after combat flights, entered the Shepheard's Hotel in Cairo used as an officers’ mess during 1942. An immaculately dressed army officer snootily told him, "I am Major the Honourable (A N Other), Assistant Provost Marshal. You and your men are improperly dressed and must leave." The Earl replied, "I am Group Captain the Earl of Bandon and therefore outrank you on both counts. Now do push off, there's a good chap."

== Early RAF career ==
The Earl graduated from Cranwell in December 1924 and was posted as a pilot to No 4 Squadron RAF in the rank of pilot officer. Two years later he was promoted to flying officer and appointed as a Qualified Flying Instructor (QFI) at No 5 Flying Training School RAF.

On 2 May 1930, by now a flight lieutenant, he was posted as a QFI to the RAF's Central Flying School but only stayed there eight months before he took up a post as Personal Assistant to the Air Officer Commanding the Middle East. In November 1931 he returned to active flying duties with No 216 Squadron RAF, also acting as squadron Adjutant. During 1931 whilst still serving with No. 216 Squadron RAF, he made the first non-stop flight from Khartoum to Cairo, re-filling his fuel tanks by hand from cans stored recklessly inside the aircraft’s cockpit.

Promotion to squadron leader came on 1 December 1936 when the Earl was posted to RAF Ternhill in Shropshire as a flight commander at No 10 Flying Training School. At the end of 1938 Bandon spent several months as a supernumerary squadron leader within No 6 (Auxiliary) Group RAF. The hiatus in his career ended in January 1939, just prior to World War II when he was summoned to a Headquarters staff posting as the Plans 3 Officer at the Directorate of Operational Plans at Adastral House. During his time in the Directorate he was a member of the committee that held talks in 1939 with delegates from Poland about the supply of Fairey Battles, Hawker Hurricanes and Supermarine Spitfires, but the agreed provision failed to reach the country before Germany overran the country.

== Second World War ==
On 1 January 1940 he received a promotion to temporary wing commander and a short term posting to Senior Staff Officer, No. 2 Group RAF. Later that year he received his first proper command when appointed Officer Commanding No. 82 Squadron RAF. A month later he was additionally designated Station Commander of RAF Watton. On 17 May 1940, his squadron was detailed to carry out a raid against German columns around Gembloux. When the expected fighter escort did not arrive, having already been intercepted by Bf 109's, the twelve Blenheims pressed on to the target and were themselves attacked by Bf 109's. All but one of the aircraft were shot down and that one collapsed when it landed back at base.

Faced with a squadron consisting of himself, one flight commander, two sergeant pilots and the ground crews, it was planned to disband the squadron but Bernard put forward a case on behalf of his ground crews that the squadron should be re-equipped. That evening twelve new Blenheims were delivered together with their crews. The following day they carried out a practice flight and that night he led six of them on a raid into Germany. This quality of leadership earned him the Distinguished Service Order.

Promoted to temporary group captain he became Station Commander of two other RAF stations during the same year, spending only a few months at each. Firstly he commanded RAF West Raynham (also in Norfolk) before moving to nearby RAF Horsham St Faith.

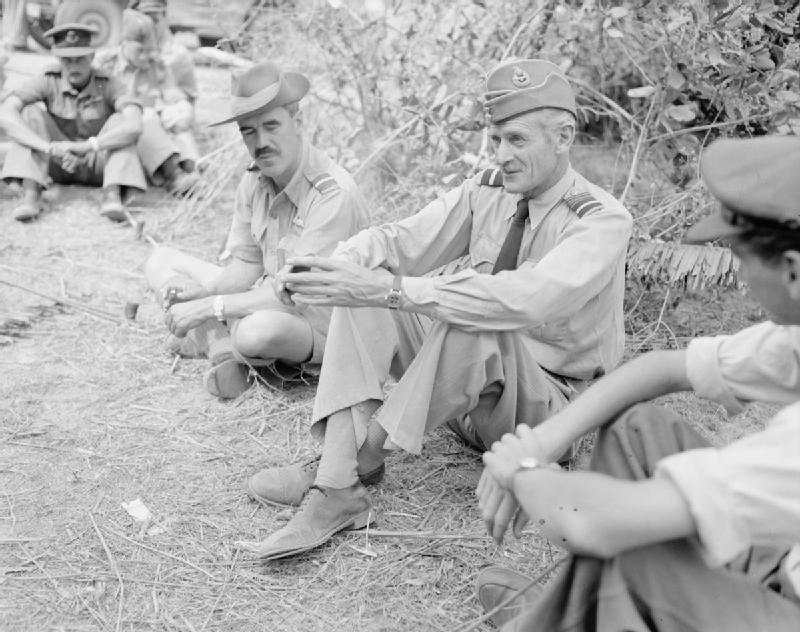
Air Commodore the Earl of Bandon, Air Officer Commanding No. 224 Group RAF, sits to the right of Keith Park at Kyaukpyu landing ground, Burma

On 29 December 1942 he was posted overseas as the Air Staff Officer, HQ Air Forces in India. The following year he moved to Air Staff Officer HQ South East Asia Command (SEAC). Bandon returned to operational command in July 1944 when he was promoted to acting air commodore and appointed Air Officer Commanding No. 224 Group RAF. During his time in command, 224 Group saw action in Burma, including fighting against the Japanese in the Arakan sector. As AOC he very unofficially continued to fly on operational sorties, removing his air commodore rank badges and flying instead in a flying officer's uniform.

== Royal Observer Corps ==
In December 1945 the Earl became the fifth Commandant of the Royal Observer Corps, taking over from the retiring Air Commodore Finlay Crerar. The Earl assumed command of the Corps at a time when it had been officially stood down from duty and placed on a care and maintenance basis. Although a period of stand-down had been ordered the Corps was not completely disbanded, as it was anticipated that the ROC must continue as an essential component of the UK’s future post-war air defence system.

The wholetime cadre of ROC officers remained in post and the ROC centres across the UK were maintained and kept in good condition. Humorous cartoons of the era depicted the wholetime officers tending flower beds in front of the ROC centres with uniform sleeves rolled up, sunning themselves in deck-chairs or sleepily answering the front door in nightgown and nightcap with a candle in their hand. Although no longer being paid, many observers continued to meet and train weekly in private and membership of the unofficial Royal Observer Corps Club expanded.

Cabinet approval was finally given for the Corps to be re-formed in January 1947 and Air Commodore the Earl of Bandon enthusiastically drew upon a considerable number of wartime experienced observers to form the nucleus around which the Corps was rebuilt, together with a massive influx of new and younger recruits. During the next two years the ROC was reorganised and vigorously retrained, but on geographical lines similar to those that existed at the end of the war. The speed of the newly introduced jet aircraft exercised the minds of the ROC senior officers as they strived to adapt to a modern environment.

With the ROC rebuilt and back to full readiness, on 1 February 1949 Lord Bandon handed over his once more fully operational command to his successor Air Commodore Richard Jordan. Having introduced the concept of annual ROC summer training camps in 1948 the Earl had formally opened the first two camps at RAF Thorney Island. In 1953 he returned as Air Vice-Marshal The Earl of Bandon to inspect the sixth annual camp at RAF Waterbeach and address the observers as a visiting VIP guest of honour.

== Later RAF career ==
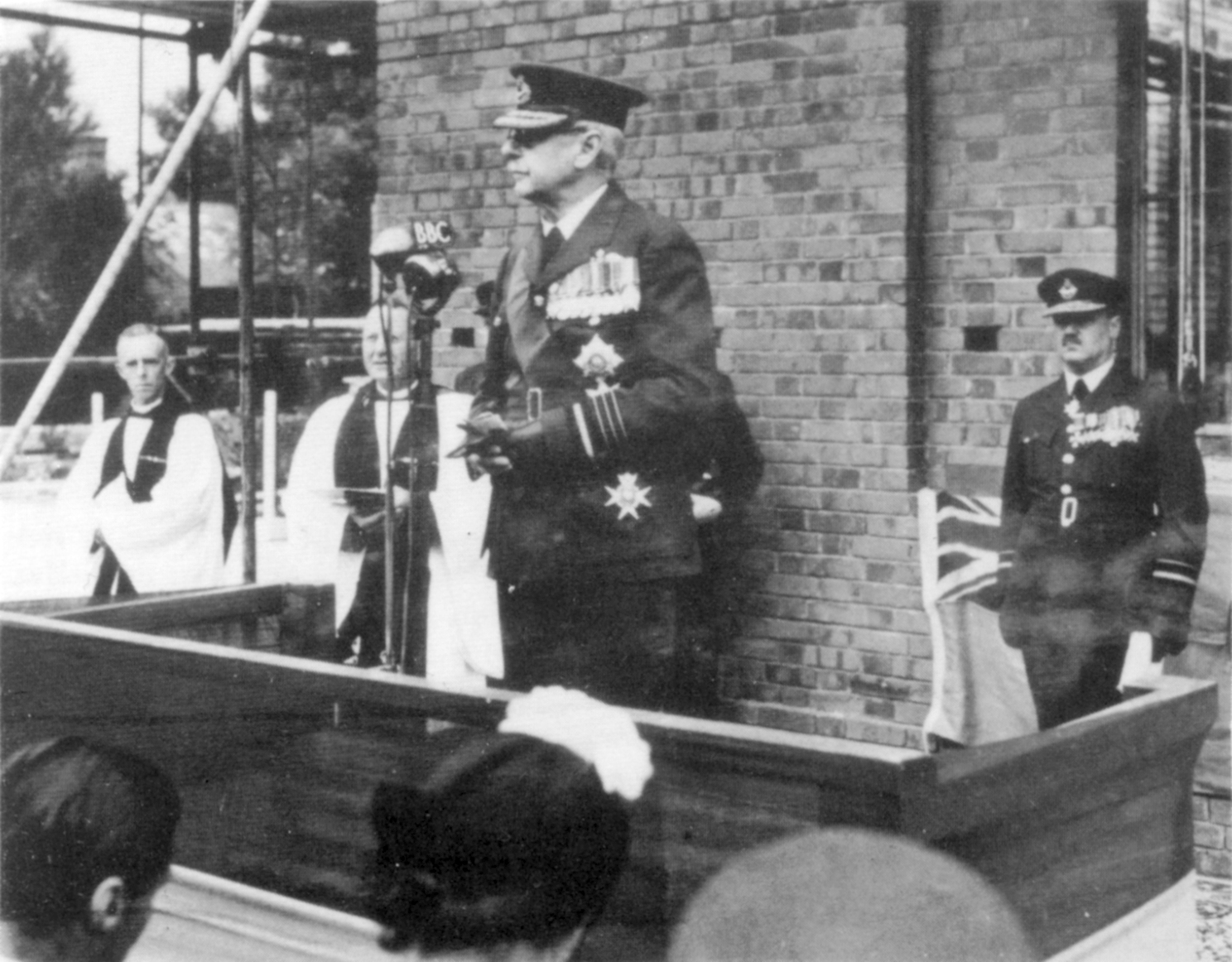
The Earl of Bandon (right) with Air Chief Marshal Lord Dowding, who is laying the foundation stone at the Battle of Britain Memorial Chapel at Biggin Hill. 24 July 1951.

After a period of sabbatical private study at the Imperial Defence College, the Earl became Air Officer Commanding No. 2 Group, Germany on 16 January 1950. Seven months later he returned to the UK as AOC No. 11 Group RAF on promotion to acting air vice marshal, a rank that was made permanent on 1 Jan 1952. In 1953 he was tasked with the formidable duty of planning the flypast for the Coronation Review of the RAF at RAF Odiham which took place on 15 July. This involved scheduling 640 aircraft to pass the reviewing point in 27 minutes. On completion of the flypast he marched to the saluting dais to pay his respects to Queen Elizabeth, who bestowed him on the spot as a Commander of the Royal Victorian Order.

On 1 October 1953, he was appointed Assistant Chief of the Air Staff with responsibility for RAF training. On 22 January 1956 he was promoted to acting air marshal and appointed as Commander in Chief of the 2nd Tactical Air Forces. In July 1957 his promotion to air marshal was made permanent and he was appointed Commander in Chief, Far East Air Force. During this period, his portrait was painted by Elva Blacker; it is now in the RAF Museum.

On 1 July 1959, Lord Bandon was promoted to air chief marshal and his final RAF appointment came on 1 March 1961 when he became Commander, Allied Air Forces Central Europe.

The Earl's disregard for any regulations or items of protocol which he considered unimportant landed him in trouble on a number of occasions throughout his career, one such being in 1957 when he received a reprimand from George Ward, Secretary of State for Air, for stating to the British press that tactical nuclear weapons would soon be issued to air forces in Europe. Another reprimand arrived from Lord Mountbatten of Burma after his de facto hijacking of the Indian Ocean island of Gan as a RAF staging post. During his tenure as C in C, FEAF he took the opportunity of flying aboard Sunderland 'P-Peter' of 205/209 Sqn when it made the last ever flight by a RAF flying boat on 15 May 1959. He then took the salute at the disbandment of the Squadron at Changi on the 31st of the month.

He retired from the RAF on 6 February 1964 and took up residence at the family estate in Cork.

== Private life ==
Bandon married Maybel Elizabeth Playfair, the daughter of Raymond Playfair, on 28 February 1933 at Nairobi Cathedral, in Kenya. They divorced thirteen years later in 1946 just before he married Lois Russell, daughter of prominent Australian Francis Russell, on 2 October 1946.

In retirement the Earl discovered the pleasures of fishing, particularly in the River Bandon which was well stocked with salmon, and in shooting, snipe and woodcock found in large numbers near Castle Bernard. He was also developing an enthusiastic skill as a gardener with a particular knowledge of rhododendrons. The Earl died on 8 February 1979 at Bon Secours Hospital in County Cork, aged 74 and without male issue. Consequently, on his death all his titles became extinct.

He was survived by Lois, Lady Bandon who died in 1999 and the two daughters from his first marriage,

- Lady Jennifer Jane Bernard, of Castle Bernard (30 April 1935 – 3 June 2010)
- Lady Frances Elizabeth Bernard (born 4 February 1943), married Paul Carter.

A portrait in oils (painted 1969) of the Earl, in his uniform as an Air Chief Marshal together with his robes as a peer of the realm, hangs in the main dining hall at the Royal Air Force College, Cranwell.

== Arms ==
Coat of arms of Percy Bernard, 5th Earl of Bandon
| Crest A Demi Lion Argent holding a Snake proper Escutcheon Argent on a Bend Azure three Escallops of the field Supporters Dexter: a Stag Argent; Sinister: a Unicorn Argent, both ducally gorged and chained Or Motto Virtus Probata Florebit |

Military offices
| Preceded by Alexander Gray | Air Officer Commanding No. 224 Group; 1944–1945 | Vacant Title next held by Valston Hancock; In 1957 |
| Preceded by Finlay Crerar | Commandant Royal Observer Corps; 1945–1949 | Succeeded by Richard Jordan |
| Preceded by Laurence Sinclair | Air Officer Commanding No. 2 Group; 1950–1951 | Succeeded by Hector McGregor |
| Preceded by Thomas Pike | Air Officer Commanding No. 11 Group; 1951–1953 | Succeeded by Hubert Patch |
| Unknown | Assistant Chief of the Air Staff (Training); 1953–1956 | Succeeded by George Harvey |
| Preceded by Sir Harry Broadhurst | Commander-in-Chief Second Tactical Air Force; 1956–1957 | Succeeded by Sir Humphrey Edwardes-Jones |
| Preceded by Sir Francis Fressanges | Commander-in-Chief Far East Air Force; 1957–1960 | Succeeded by Sir Anthony Selway |
| Preceded by Sir Harry Broadhurst | Commander Allied Air Forces Central Europe; 1961–1963 | Succeeded by Sir Edmund Hudleston |
Peerage of Ireland
| Preceded by James Bernard | Earl of Bandon; 1924–1979 | Extinct |
