= 1820 United Kingdom general election =

- 6 March – 14 April 1820

All 658 seats in the House of Commons 330 seats needed for a majority
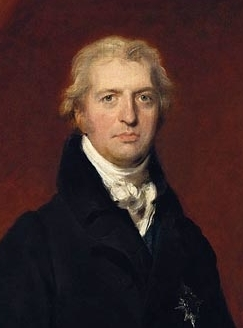

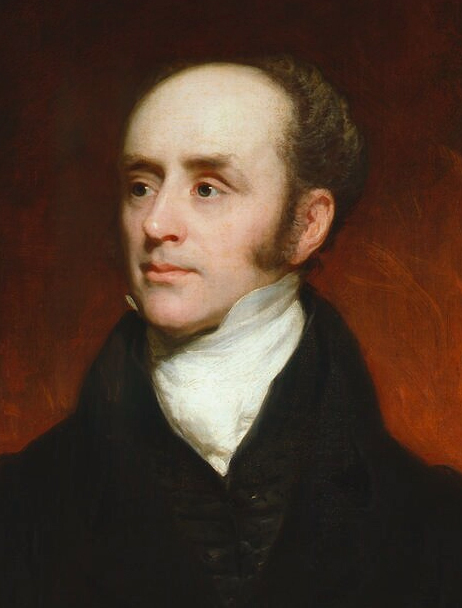
	First party	Second party
Leader	Earl of Liverpool	Earl Grey
Party	Tory	Whig
Leader since	8 June 1812	—
Seats before	280	175
Seats won	341	215
Seat change	▲61	▲40
- Composition of the House of Commons after the election
Prime Minister before election
Earl of Liverpool
Tory
Prime Minister after election
Earl of Liverpool
Tory

The 1820 United Kingdom general election was held on 6 March 1820 to 14 April 1820, to elect members of the House of Commons, the lower house of Parliament. Triggered by the death of King George III, it produced the first parliament of the reign of his successor, King George IV. It was held shortly after the Radical War in Scotland and the Cato Street Conspiracy. In this atmosphere, the Tories under the Earl of Liverpool were able to win a substantial majority over the Whigs.

The sixth United Kingdom Parliament was dissolved on 29 February 1820. The new Parliament was summoned to meet on 21 April 1820, for a maximum seven-year term from that date. The maximum term could be and normally was curtailed, by the monarch dissolving the Parliament before its term expired.

== Political situation ==
The Tory leader was the Earl of Liverpool, who had been prime minister since his predecessor's assassination in 1812. Liverpool had led his party to two general election victories before that of 1820. The Tory Leader of the House of Commons was Robert Stewart, Viscount Castlereagh.

The Whig Party continued to suffer from weak leadership, particularly in the House of Commons.

At the time of the general election, the Earl Grey was the leading figure amongst the Whig peers. It was likely that Grey would have been invited to form a government, had the Whigs come to power, although in this era the monarch rather than the governing party decided which individual would be prime minister.

The Leader of the Opposition in the House of Commons, George Tierney, was successful at first after the Whig gains at the 1818 general election. However, on 18 May 1819, Tierney moved a motion in the House of Commons for a committee on the state of the nation. This motion was defeated by 357 to 178. Foord comments that "this defeat put an effective end to Tierney's leadership". However he continued to be the nominal leader at the time of the 1820 election.

== Dates of election ==
At this period there was not one election day. After receiving a writ (a royal command) for the election to be held, the local returning officer fixed the election timetable for the particular constituency or constituencies he was concerned with. Polling in seats with contested elections could continue for many days. It was triggered by the death of King George III.

The general election took place between the first contest on 6 March and the last contest on 14 April 1820.

== Summary of the constituencies ==
Monmouthshire (1 County constituency with 2 MPs and one single member Borough constituency) is included in Wales in these tables. Sources for this period may include the county in England.

Table 1: Constituencies and MPs, by type and country

Country	BC	CC	UC	Total C	BMP	CMP	UMP	Total MPs
England	202	40	2	243	404	78	4	486
Wales	13	12	0	26	13	14	0	27
Scotland	15	30	0	45	15	30	0	45
Ireland	33	32	1	66	35	64	1	100
Total	263	114	3	380	467	176	5	658

Table 2: Number of seats per constituency, by type and country

Country	BCx1	BCx2	BCx4	CCx1	CCx2	UCx1	UCx2	Total C
England	4	196	2	0	39	0	2	243
Wales	13	0	0	12	1	0	0	26
Scotland	15	0	0	30	0	0	0	45
Ireland	31	2	0	0	32	1	0	66
Total	63	198	2	42	72	1	2	380

== See also ==
- United Kingdom general elections
