= Denis Bernard (British Army officer) =

British Army general

Lieutenant-General Sir Denis Bernard KCB CMG DSO
- Born: 22 October 1882; St George Hanover Square, London, England
- Died: 25 August 1956 (aged 73); Galway, Ireland
- Military career
- Allegiance: United Kingdom
- Branch: British Army
- Service years: 1902–1941
- Rank: Lieutenant-General
- Service number: 6014
- Units: Rifle Brigade (The Prince Consort's Own); Royal Ulster Rifles
- Commands: 3rd Division; 1st Battalion, Royal Ulster Rifles
- Conflicts: First World War; Second World War
- Awards: Knight Commander of the Order of the Bath; Companion of the Order of St Michael and St George; Distinguished Service Order

Lieutenant-General Sir Denis John Charles Kirwan Bernard, KCB, CMG, DSO (22 October 1882 – 25 August 1956) was a British Army officer who commanded the 3rd Infantry Division shortly before the outbreak of the Second World War. He was also Governor of Bermuda and general officer commanding the Bermuda Garrison.

== Early life and education ==
Bernard was born in London, the son of Percy Bernard MP. He was educated at Eton College and the Royal Military College, Sandhurst, and commissioned into the British Army as a second lieutenant in the Rifle Brigade (The Prince Consort's Own) on 22 October 1902.

== Career ==
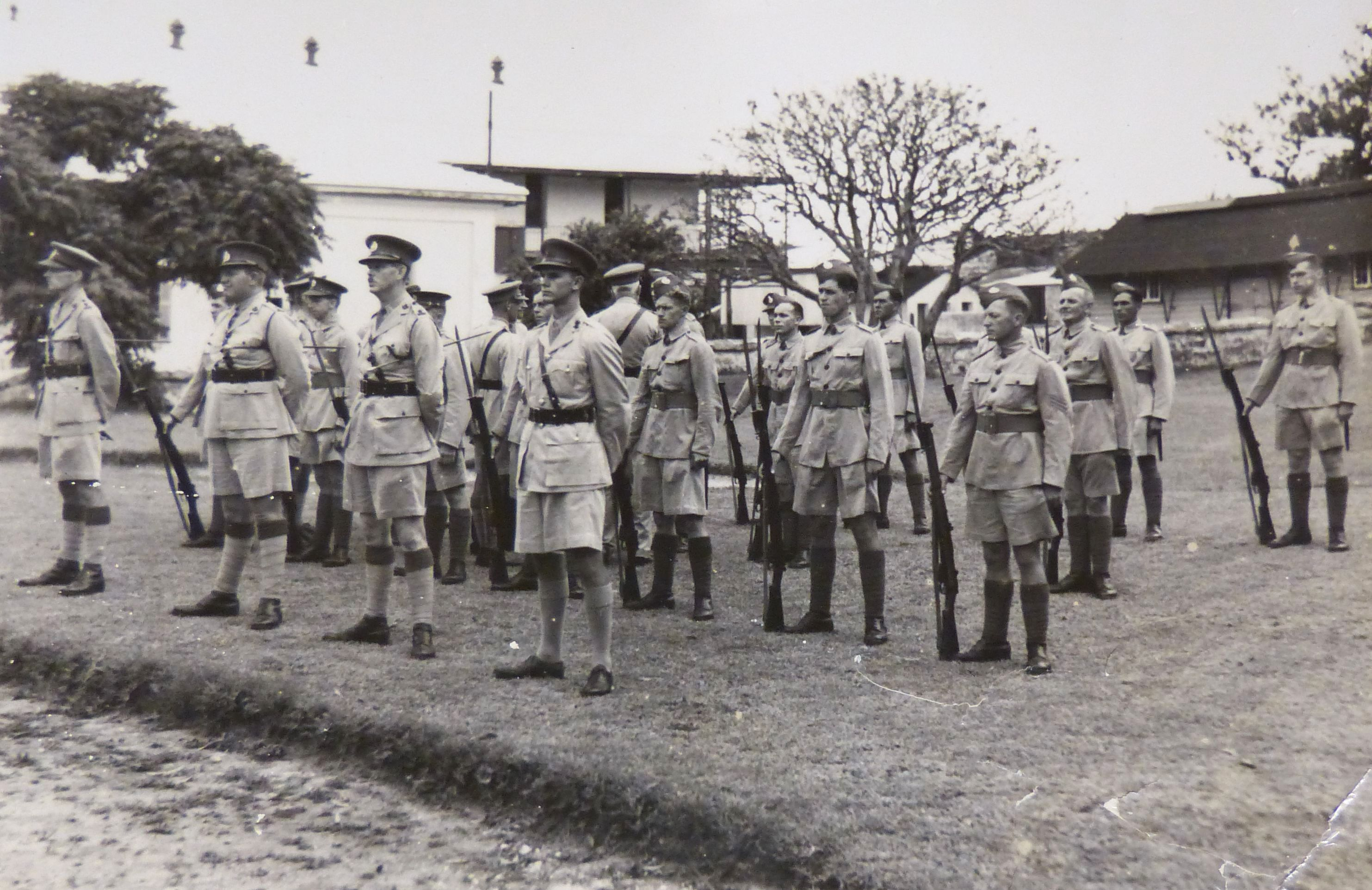
Governor and general officer commanding, Lieutenant-general Sir Denis Bernard, inspects the First Contingent of the BVRC to the Lincolnshire Regiment at Prospect Camp on 22 June 1940.

He fought in World War I as a river transport officer with the British Expeditionary Force and then served in France, Gallipoli, Salonika and Egypt. He was made a GSO2 in November 1915 and succeeded Brigadier General John Duncan as a GSO1 in April 1916.

He was appointed commanding officer of the 1st Battalion, Royal Ulster Rifles, in 1927, brigadier, general staff (BGS) at Northern Command in India in 1930 and on 20 August 1932 he succeeded Cecil Heywood as personal aide-de-camp to King George V. He relinquished his position of BGS on 15 March 1934 and became Director of Recruiting and Organisation at the War Office in 1934. His last appointment was as general officer commanding 3rd Division in 1936 before he retired in 1939.

In retirement he became governor of the Imperial fortress colony of Bermuda and general officer commanding-in-chief of the Bermuda Garrison. While serving as Governor he had to consider proposals for American military bases there: these proposals were bitterly opposed by the local people at the time despite the war-time needs of the American military and he resigned at the request of the British Government in 1941 "to make way for a civilian". Bernard Park in Hamilton, Bermuda is named after him. His family home was Castlehacket House in Galway, where he died in 1956, aged 73.

Military offices
Preceded by Cecil Heywood	GOC 3rd Infantry Division; 1936–1939	Succeeded by Bernard Montgomery
Government offices
Preceded by Sir Reginald Hildyard	Governor of Bermuda; 1939–1941	Succeeded by Viscount Knollys
