= James Bernard, 4th Earl of Bandon =

The Right Honourable The Earl of Bandon KP
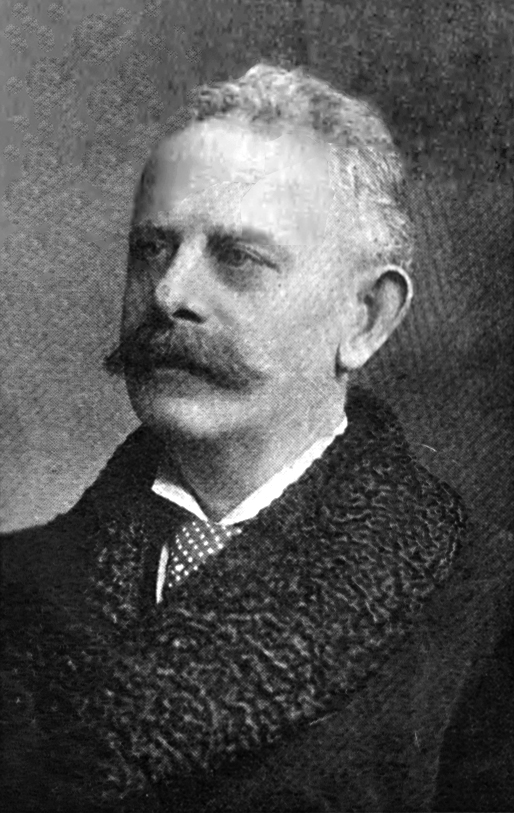
- Bernard in 1900
- Born: James Francis Bernard; 12 September 1850; Ireland
- Died: 18 May 1924 (aged 73); Ireland
- Occupations: Deputy lieutenant, Representative peer of Ireland

James Francis Bernard, 4th Earl of Bandon, KP (12 September 1850 – 18 May 1924), was a British Deputy Lieutenant in Ireland and Irish representative peer. Bernard was a cousin of the Earl of Midleton, who was head of the southern Irish Unionist Alliance at the time of the Anglo-Irish War, 1919–21.

== Estate ==
He reorganised his various County Cork estates by way of settlement in 1876 and further in 1895 and 1896 including the mortgaging of the lands to his agents Richard Wheeler Doherty, and the appointment of George and John Jones and Doherty as his attorneys. He was appointed High Sheriff of County Cork for 1875, and succeeded his father as Honorary Colonel of the Royal Cork City Artillery militia on 31 July 1878, being reappointed to the post when the regiment (by then known as the Cork Royal Garrison Artillery) transferred to the Special Reserve in 1908.

He owned 40,000 acres in County Cork.

== The War of Independence ==
The family seat, Castle Bernard, near Bandon, County Cork, was one of the great houses burned during the Irish War of Independence in the early 1920s by the Irish Republican Army under Seán Hales on 21 June 1921. The home was burned as a counter-reprisal measure against British policy of burning the homes of suspected Irish republicans. Seán Hales's own family home was burned just prior, and Castle Bernard was burned in retaliation.

Bernard was kidnapped and held hostage for three weeks being released on 12 July. The IRA threatened to have him executed if the British went ahead with executing IRA prisoners. During his captivity, Bernard reportedly played cards with his captors, who seem to have treated him well. Reportedly, Lord Bandon would give one of his captors, Daniel O'Leary (also known An Leabhar, Irish for 'The Book', based on the fact he was so well read), money each day to travel from the house in Kilcolman townland to Slattery's pub in Ahiohill in order to purchase Clonakilty Wrastler (a local beer).

After the captivity, Bernard gifted Seán Hales "a fine stick as a mark of his gratitude and esteem for Seán's conduct towards him".

== See also ==
- List of kidnappings
- List of solved missing person cases (pre-1950)

=== References ===
Registry of Deeds, Dublin, 1876, 1895 and 1896 Bandon Historical Journal no 12 (1996)

Peerage of Ireland
Preceded by Francis Bernard	Earl of Bandon; 1877–1924	Succeeded by Percy Bernard
Honorary titles
Preceded by The Earl of Bandon	Lord Lieutenant of Cork; 1877–1922	Office abolished
Parliament of the United Kingdom
Preceded by The Lord Dunboyne	Representative peer for Ireland; 1881–1924	Office lapsed
