= Bandon Distillery =

Irish whiskey distillery

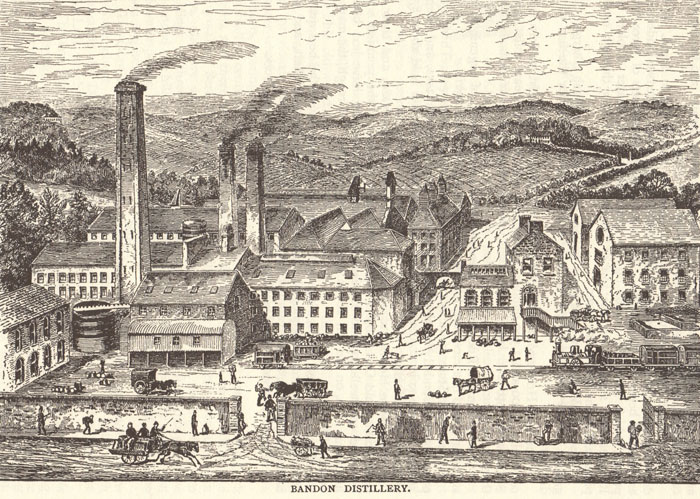
- Location: Bandon
- Coordinates: 51°44′48.5″N 8°43′11.2″W
- Owner: Allman & Co. Distillers
- Founded: 1826
- Founder: James C Allman, Richard Allman
- Status: Defunct
- No. of stills: 5 pot stills (2 x 16,000 gallon wash stills; 3 x spirit stills, 2 x 4,000 gallon, 1 x 12,000 gallon)
- Capacity: > 500,000
- Mothballed: 1929

Allman's Pure Pot Still Irish Whisky
- Type: Single Pot Still Single Malt Whiskey

Allman's Bandon Distillery was an Irish whiskey distillery which was established in 1826 in Bandon, County Cork, Ireland. The distillery closed in 1929 following financial difficulties. However, agents for the company trading under the name Allman, Dowden & Co., may have continued to sell off the existing stock which had built up in bonded warehouses, in both cask and bottled form, until 1939.

== History ==
In 1826, James C. Allman established a distillery in a converted 18th Century mill, following the failure of the family's cotton manufacturing business. There is no record of any previous distillery operating in Bandon, nor is there any record of Allman having prior experience in distilling himself. A report at the time, showed that production between October 1826 and October 1827 totalled some 63,023 gallons. Thereafter, the distillery grew in capacity over time as profits from the initial years of operating were reinvested in the business, reaching a capacity of 200,000 per annum by 1836, and by the mid-1800s the distillery had become the largest rural distillery in Ireland, with a capacity in excess of 500,000 gallons per annum. By 1846, Richard Allman had succeeded to the business, and by 1881 it was owned by Richard and his brother James C. Allman (junior), in a partnership trading as "Allman and Company". When Alfred Barnard, a British historian visited the distillery in 1887, it had become a significant enterprise, with a payroll of about 200. Boasting its own private railway line, and with the largest malting floors in the United Kingdom aside from those at the Guinness Brewery in Dublin, which were marginally larger, Allmans' and was said to be "the most dominant landmark in rural County Cork". According to Barnard, Allman's whiskey was of "superior quality", and although it enjoyed a large trade in Ireland, was chiefly exported to "England, Scotland and the Colonies". At the time, the firm produced both traditional Irish single pot still whiskey and pure malt whiskey.

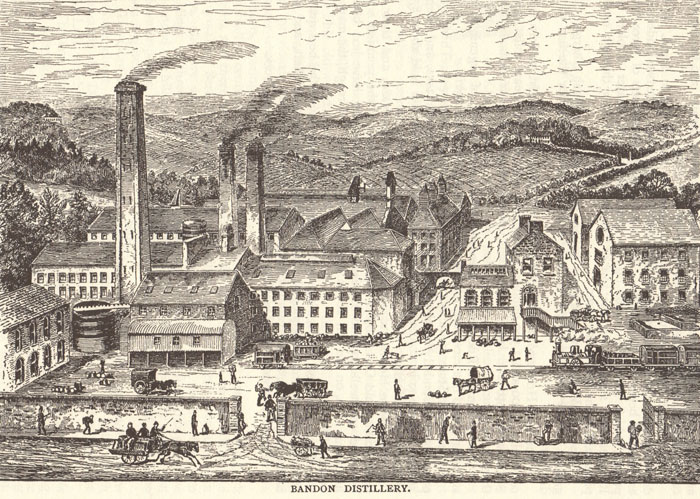
The Bandon Distillery, circa 1885.

In 1878, a fire broke out in the mill room of the distillery, destroying the mill, malthouse and 400 barrels of grain. The nearby bonded warehouses were saved by cutting down a timber bridge which connected them to the burning building. The damage, estimated to have amounted to £6,000, was covered by insurance. The fire cost the life of one employee, a local man named Richard White, not connected with the establishment, who fell from a height of 12 ft while trying to extinguish the flames.

In the late 19th and early 20th century, while many Scottish distillers were introducing Coffey stills, which were cheaper to run than the traditional pot stills, a debate raged amongst Irish distillers as to whether follow suit. Many Irish distillers, whether rightly or wrongly, considered coffey stills to produce an inferior spirit. Mirroring this debate, in 1904, another James C. Allman, the 82-year-old company senior manager banned its introduction at the Bandon Distillery, bringing him into conflict with company director JJ McDaniel, his nephew. In 1910, James C. Allman went to the high court to request that the company be wound down. However, he died before the company could be closed, with the shares passing to his three nephews, and JJ McDaniel becoming the controlling shareholder.

However, the high costs of court action, coupled with the financial difficulties that many Irish distillers faced in the 1920s as Prohibition and the Anglo-Irish trade wars greatly reduced potential export markets meant that the planned Coffey still was never actually introduced, and the distillery was forced to cease production in 1925 just short of its centenary. This greatly impacted the local economy, as the distillery was both a large employer in the rural community and a larger consumer of agricultural produce. Although some distillery buildings were operated as a mill through the 1930s, many were demolished, and the railway line uplifted following World War II.

In 2016, an extremely rare, unopened bottle of Allman's whiskey dating from 1916 sold for €6,600. According to the label, the whiskey was distilled in Bandon, but bottled at the Nuns' Island Distillery, County Galway. This bottle would be doubly rare, as the Nun's Island Distillery itself is believed to have closed circa World War I. As of 2016, another unopened bottle dating from before 1900 is listed for sale by a Dublin Whiskey shop.

A son of the founder, and partner in the business, Richard Allman sat as a Member of the British Parliament from 1880 to 1885.

== See also ==
- Irish whiskey
- Irish whiskey brands
- Richard Allman

=== Bibliography ===
- McGuire, Edward B. (1973). Irish Whiskey: A History Of Distilling, The Spirit Trade, And Excise Controls In Ireland. Dublin: Gill and MacMillan. ISBN 0064947017.
- Mulryan, Peter (2002). The Whiskeys of Ireland. Dublin: O'Brien Press. ISBN 0862787513.
- Townsend, Brian (1997–1999). The Lost Distilleries of Ireland. Glasgow: Angels' Share (Neil Wilson Publishing). ISBN 1897784872.
