= George Tierney =

Irish politician

The Right Honourable George Tierney
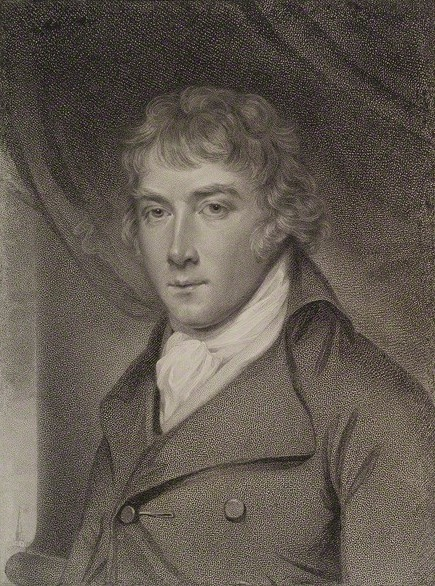

Treasurer of the Navy
- In office 1803–1804
- Monarch: George III
- Prime Minister: Henry Addington
- Preceded by: Charles Bragge
- Succeeded by: George Canning

President of the Board of Control
- In office 1806–1807
- Monarch: George III
- Prime Minister: The Lord Grenville
- Preceded by: Thomas Grenville
- Succeeded by: Hon. Robert Dundas

Master of the Mint
- In office 1827–1828
- Monarch: George IV
- Prime Minister: George Canning; The Viscount Goderich
- Preceded by: Hon. William Wellesley-Pole
- Succeeded by: John Charles Herries

Personal details
- Born: 20 March 1761 Gibraltar
- Died: 25 January 1830 (aged 68) Savile Row, London
- Party: Whig
- Education: Peterhouse, Cambridge

George Tierney PC (20 March 1761 – 25 January 1830) was an Irish Whig politician. For much of his career he was in opposition to the governments of William Pitt and Lord Liverpool. From 1818 to 1821 he was Leader of the Opposition in the House of Commons.

== Background and education ==
Born in Gibraltar, Tierney was the son of Thomas Tierney, a wealthy Irish merchant of London, who was living in Gibraltar as prize agent. He was sent to Eton and Peterhouse, Cambridge, where he took the degree of Law in 1784. He was called to the bar from Lincoln's Inn in the same year, but abandoned law and plunged into politics. On 10 July 1789 he married Anna Maria Miller of Stapleton in Gloucestershire; she died in 1844.

== Political career ==
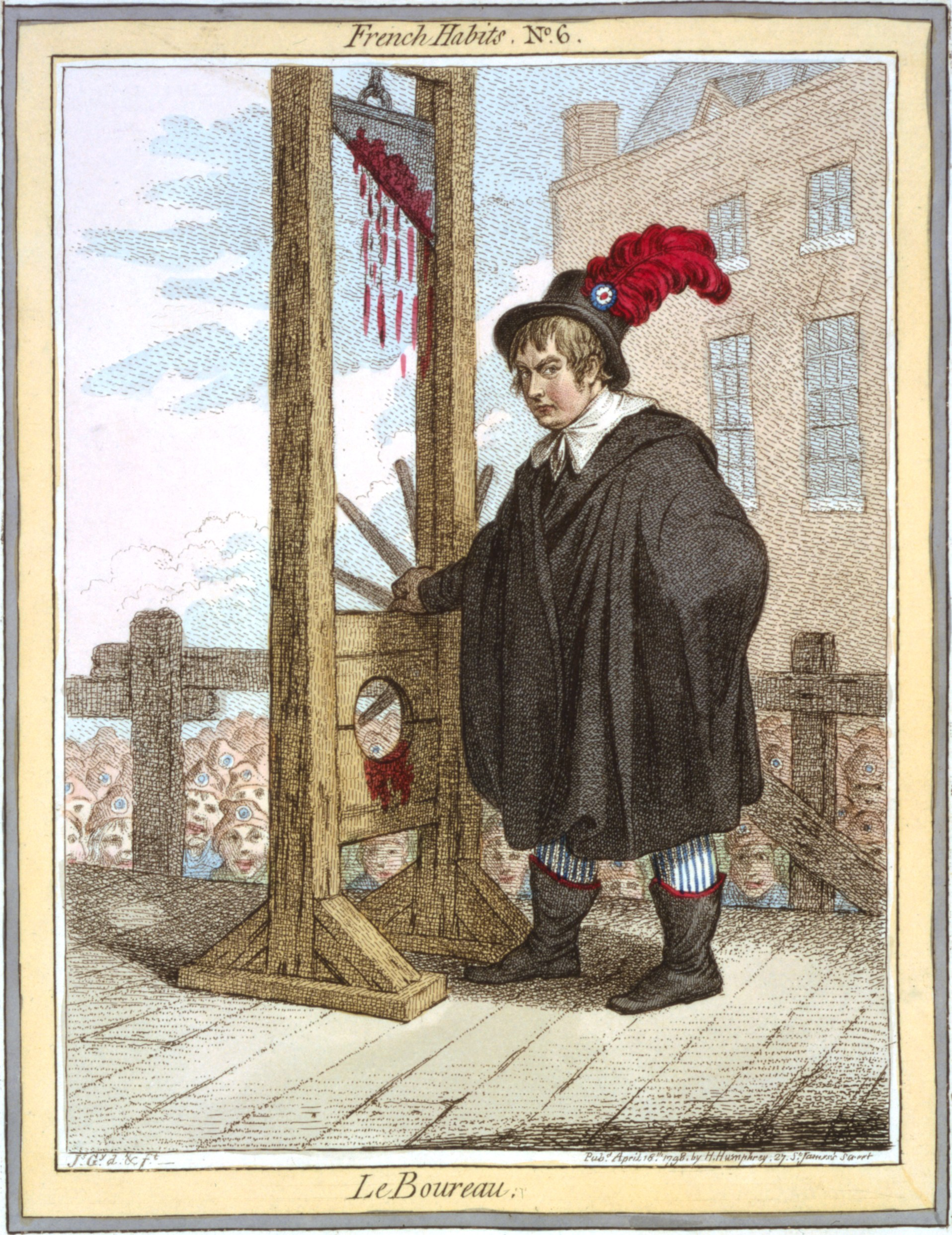
In Le Boureau (1798), James Gillray caricatured Tierney as a French executioner.

=== Early career ===
Tierney contested Colchester in 1788, when both candidates received the same number of votes, but Tierney was declared elected. He was, however, defeated in the 1790 general election.

He returned to Parliament in 1796 for Southwark and sat for that seat until 1806, and then represented in turn Athlone (1806–1807), Bandon (1807–1812), Appleby (1812–1818), and Knaresborough (1818–1830). During his early years in Parliament he was known for his radical views and was a supporter of Charles James Fox. The French Revolution of 1789 was a polarising force in British Whig politics with some supporting the revolution, and others such as Edmund Burke strongly opposed to it. Because of his radical views, Tierney was often portrayed in caricatures in the costume of a French revolutionary.

=== Duel ===
When Charles James Fox seceded from the House of Commons, Tierney emerged as one of the most prominent opponents of William Pitt's foreign policy. In May 1798, Pitt accused him of want of patriotism. A duel ensued at Putney Heath on Sunday, 27 May 1798; but neither combatant was injured.

=== Office ===
In 1803, Tierney, partly because peace had been ratified with France at Amiens, and partly because Pitt was out of office, joined the ministry of Henry Addington as Treasurer of the Navy, and was created a Privy Councillor; but this alienated many of his supporters among the middle classes, and offended most of the influential Whigs. On the death of Fox in 1806 he joined William Grenville's Ministry of All the Talents as President of the Board of Control, with a seat in the cabinet, and thus brought himself once more into line with the Whigs. He left office the following year when Grenville's government fell and was replaced by the Tories, who were to dominate office for the next generation. Tierney was in opposition for the following twenty years.

=== Opposition ===
About a year after the death of George Ponsonby in 1817, Tierney reluctantly became the recognised leader of the opposition in the House of Commons. At first he was successful, with Whig gains being made at the 1818 general election. On 18 May 1819, Tierney moved a motion in the House of Commons for a committee on the state of the nation. This motion was defeated by 357 to 178, which was a division involving the largest number of MPs until the debates over the Reform bill in the early 1830s. Foord comments that "this defeat put an effective end to Tierney's leadership... Tierney did not disclaim the leadership until 23 Jan. 1821 ..., but he had ceased to exercise its functions since the great defeat".

=== Final years ===
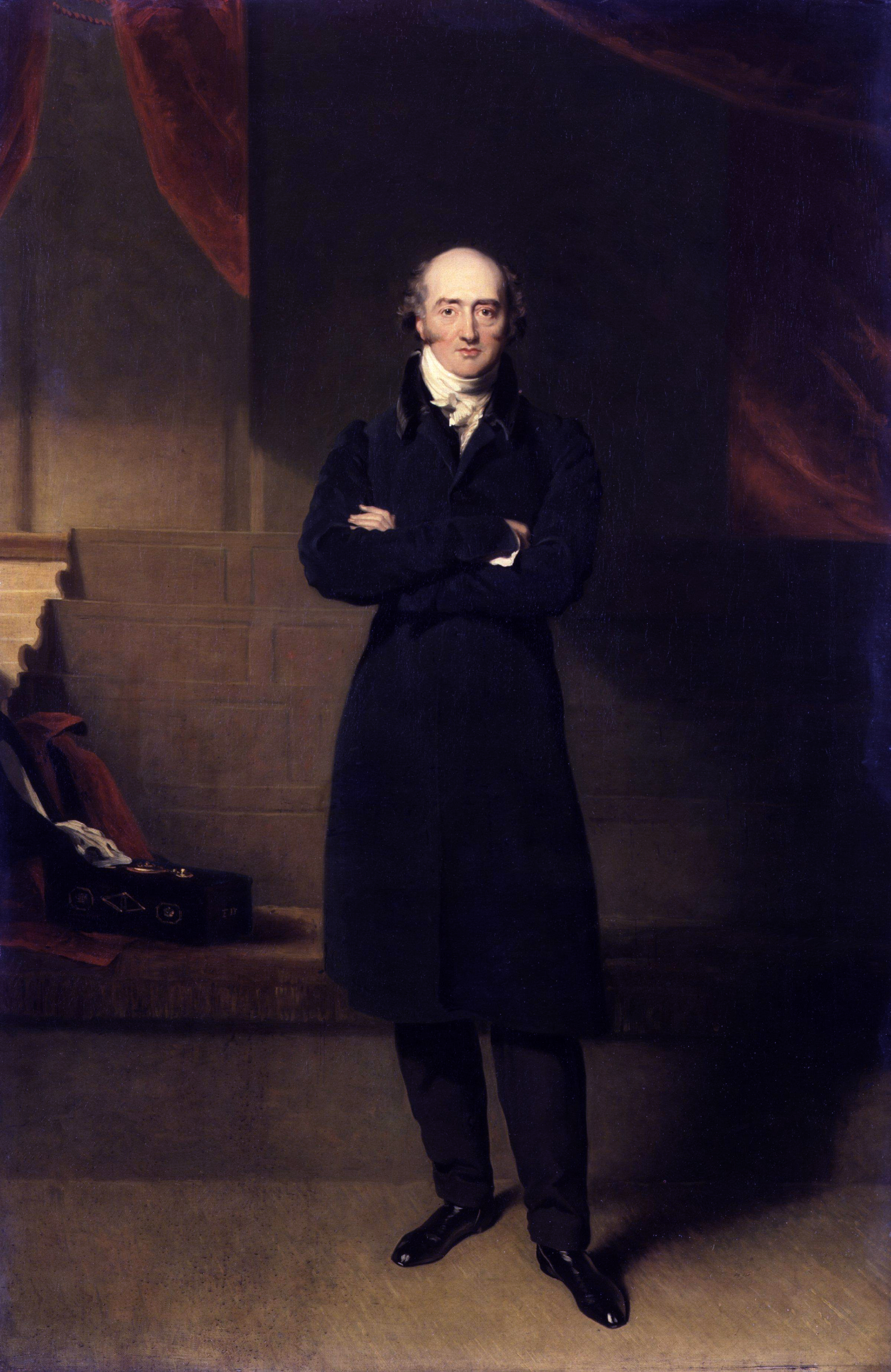
Late in his career Tierney joined the government of Tory George Canning.

In George Canning's ministry, he was Master of the Mint, and when Lord Goderich succeeded to the lead Tierney was admitted to the cabinet; but he was already suffering from ill-health and died suddenly at Savile Row, London.

== Sources ==
- Parliamentary Election Results in Ireland 1801–1922, edited by B. M. Walker (Royal Irish Academy 1978).
- His Majesty's Opposition 1714–1830, by Archibald S. Foord (Oxford University Press 1964)

Parliament of Great Britain
Preceded by Sir Edmund Affleck, Bt; Sir Robert Smyth, Bt H	Member of Parliament for Colchester; 1788–1790; With: Sir Robert Smyth, Bt	Succeeded by Robert Thornton; George Jackson
Preceded by Henry Thornton; George Thellusson	Member of Parliament for Southwark; 1796–1800; With: Henry Thornton	Succeeded by Parliament of the United Kingdom
Parliament of the United Kingdom
Preceded by Parliament of Great Britain	Member of Parliament for Southwark; 1801–1806; With: Henry Thornton	Succeeded by Henry Thornton; Sir Thomas Turton, Bt
Preceded by Thomas Tyrwhitt Jones	Member of Parliament for Athlone; 1806–1807	Succeeded by Hon. Henry Wellesley
Preceded by Viscount Boyle	Member of Parliament for Bandon; 1807–1812	Succeeded by Richard Bernard
Preceded by John Courtenay; James Lowther	Member of Parliament for Appleby; 1812–1818; With: James Lowther	Succeeded by George Fludyer; Lucius Concannon
Preceded by Lord John Townshend; Viscount Ossulston	Member of Parliament for Knaresborough; 1818–1830; With: Sir James Mackintosh	Succeeded by Sir James Mackintosh; Henry Brougham
Political offices
Preceded by Charles Bragge	Treasurer of the Navy; 1803–1804	Succeeded by George Canning
Preceded by Thomas Grenville	President of the Board of Control; 1806–1807	Succeeded by Hon. Robert Dundas
Preceded by Hon. William Wellesley-Pole	Master of the Mint; 1827–1828	Succeeded by John Charles Herries
Preceded by George Ponsonby	Leader of the Opposition in the House of Commons; 1818–1821	Vacant Title next held by Viscount Althorp from 1830
Party political offices
Preceded by George Ponsonby	Leader of the Whig Party in the House of Commons; 1818–1821	Vacant Title next held by Viscount Althorp from 1830
