= George Johnston Allman =

Irish mathematician and historian (1824–1904)

George Johnston Allman FRS
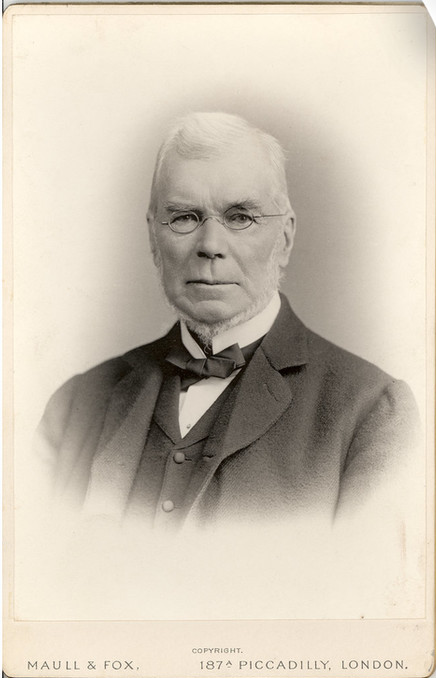
- Allman c. 1870s
- Born: 28 September 1824; Dublin, Ireland
- Died: 9 May 1904 (aged 79); Dublin, Ireland
- Scientific career
- Fields: Mathematics, history of mathematics

George Johnston Allman (28 September 1824 – 8 May 1904) was an Irish professor, mathematician, classical scholar, and historian of ancient Greek mathematics. His fame rests mainly upon his authorship of Greek Geometry from Thales to Euclid, first published in Dublin in 1889, and republished several times subsequently.

== Life ==
He was born in Dublin the son of William Allman MD, also a botanist.

He held the position of Professor of Mathematics at Queen's University of Ireland for forty years, from 1853 until reaching retirement age in 1893.

He died at Finglass, Dublin on 8 May 1904. He had married in 1853 Louisa, the daughter of John Smith Taylor of Dublin.

== Recognition ==
He was elected a Fellow of the Royal Society in June 1884. His candidacy citation read: "Member of the Senate of the Queen's University of Ireland, – Appointed by Charter one of the original Senators of the Royal University of Ireland – Member of Standing Committee of the said University. Author of the following papers, amongst others: "Method of deriving the Polar Equations of Dynamics & Hydrodynamics from direct physical considerations" – Dublin University Phil Transactions 1848. "On certain Curves traced on the Surface of an Ellipsoid", Camb & Dub Math Journal. 1848. "On the Attraction of Ellipsoids, with a new demonstration of Clairaut's Theorem, being an account of the late Prof MacCullagh's lectures", Trans RI Academy 1855. "On some properties of Paraboloids". Quarterly Journal Maths 1874. "Greek Geometry from Thales to Euclid, Part 1" Hermathena 1877. Do "Part 2" Hermathena, 1881"
