= Earl of Bandon =

- Creation date: 29 August 1800
- Created by: George III
- Peerage: Peerage of Ireland
- First holder: Francis Bernard, 1st Earl of Bandon
- Last holder: Percy Bernard, 5th Earl of Bandon
- Remainder to: 1st Earl's heirs of the body lawfully begotten
- Subsidiary titles: Viscount Bernard; Viscount Bandon; Baron Bandon
- Status: Extinct
- Former seat: Castle Bernard
- Motto: Virtus probata florescit (Tried virtue flourishes)
- Arms: Argent, on a bend azure, three escallops of the field

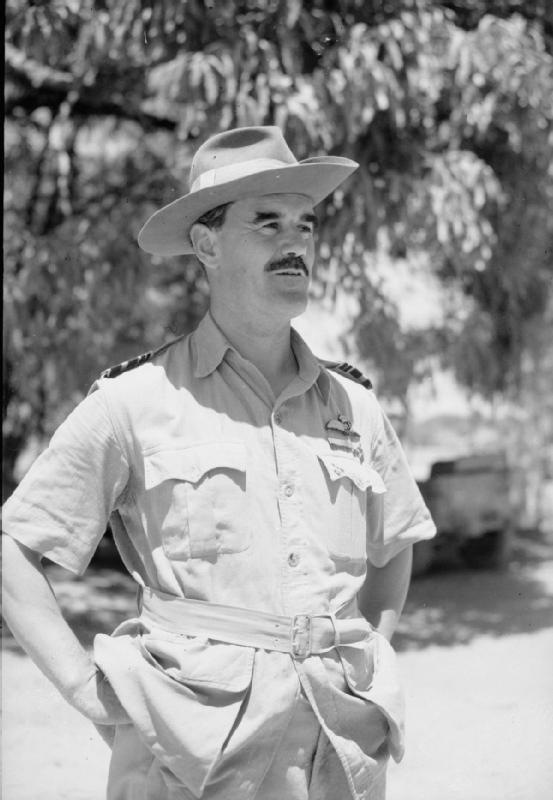
Air Chief Marshal Percy Bernard, 5th Earl of Bandon.

Earl of Bandon was a title in the Peerage of Ireland. It was created in 1800 for Francis Bernard, 1st Viscount Bandon, son of politician James Bernard. Francis Bernard had already been created Baron Bandon, of Bandon Bridge in the County of Cork, in 1793, Viscount Bandon, of Bandon Bridge in the County of Cork, in 1795, and was made Viscount Bernard at the same time as he was granted the earldom. These titles were also in the Peerage of Ireland.

The titles descended from father to son until the death of his great-grandson, James, the fourth Earl, in 1924. The late Earl was succeeded by his first cousin twice removed, Percy Bernard, the fifth Earl. The latter was the great-grandson of the Right Reverend Charles Bernard, Bishop of Tuam, younger son of the second Earl. The fifth Earl was an Air Chief Marshal in the Royal Air Force. He had two daughters but no sons and on his death in 1979 the titles became extinct.

Francis Bernard, great-grandfather of the first Earl, was a lawyer and politician while Francis' younger brother Arthur is the 7th-great-grandfather of Justin Trudeau, Prime Minister of Canada.

The family seat of the Earls of Bandon was Castle Bernard, County Cork, in the Republic of Ireland. Castle Bernard itself was destroyed as a result of an IRA attack in 1921, when the 4th earl was abducted for 10 days, and now stands as a ruin. The family later built a new home on the estate, which remained in the ownership of Lady Jennifer Bernard (1935–2010), the elder daughter of the late 5th and last Earl of Bandon by his first wife, until her death. The Castle Bernard estate is owned by Lady Frances Carter (b. 1943), the younger sister of the late Lady Jennifer Bernard.

== Earls of Bandon (1800) ==
- Francis Bernard, 1st Earl of Bandon (1755–1830) (elected an Irish representative peer in 1800)
- James Bernard, 2nd Earl of Bandon (1785–1856) (elected an Irish representative peer in 1835)
- Francis Bernard, 3rd Earl of Bandon (1810–1877) (elected an Irish representative peer in 1858)
- James Francis Bernard, 4th Earl of Bandon (1850–1924) (elected an Irish representative peer in 1881)
- Percy Ronald Gardner Bernard, 5th Earl of Bandon (1904–1979)
