= Francis Bernard, 3rd Earl of Bandon =

Irish peer and politician (1810–1877)

Francis Bernard, 3rd Earl of Bandon (3 January 1810 – 17 February 1877), styled Viscount Bernard between 1830 and 1856, was an Irish peer and politician.

== Background and education ==
Born in Grosvenor Street, London, he was the son of James Bernard, 2nd Earl of Bandon, and Mary Susan Albinia, eldest daughter of Charles Brodrick, Archbishop of Cashel. Bernard was educated at Oriel College, Oxford, where he graduated with a Bachelor of Arts in 1830 and a Master of Arts four years thereafter.

== Political career ==
Bernard entered the British House of Commons in January 1831, sitting for Bandon, the same constituency his father had represented before, until July. He was returned for it again from 1842 until 1856, when he succeeded his father as earl. Two years later, Bernard was elected an Irish representative peer. In 1874, he was appointed Lord Lieutenant of Cork, post he held until his death in 1877.

He was appointed Colonel of the disembodied Royal Cork City Militia on 5 September 1846 and after the Militia Act 1852 he revived the regiment as the Royal Cork City Artillery. He retired from the command and was appointed the regiment's first Honorary Colonel on 12 November 1873.

== Family ==
He married Catherine Mary, eldest daughter of Thomas Whitmore, in 1832. They had one son and two daughters. His wife died in December 1873. Bernard survived her by four years and died at Castle Bernard, County Cork, in February 1877, aged 67. He was succeeded in the earldom by his only son James.

Parliament of the United Kingdom
Preceded by James Bernard, Viscount Bernard	Member of Parliament for Bandon; January – July 1831	Succeeded by Augustus Clifford
Preceded by Joseph Devonsher Jackson	Member of Parliament for Bandon; 1842 – 1856	Succeeded by William Smyth Bernard
Political offices
Preceded by The Earl of Glengall	Representative peer for Ireland; 1858–1877	Succeeded by The Earl Annesley
Honorary titles
Preceded by The Lord Fermoy	Lord Lieutenant of Cork; 1874 – 1877	Succeeded by The Earl of Bandon
Peerage of Ireland
Preceded by James Bernard	Earl of Bandon; 1856 – 1877	Succeeded by James Francis Bernard
