= Francis Bernard, 1st Earl of Bandon =

Irish peer and politician

Francis Bernard, 1st Earl of Bandon (26 November 1755 – 26 November 1830) was an Irish peer and politician.

He was the only son of James Bernard and his wife Esther Smith, daughter of Percy Smith. Between 1778 and 1783, Bernard sat as Member of Parliament (MP) for Ennis. Subsequently, he represented Bandonbridge in the Irish House of Commons until 1790.

In 1793, Bernard was raised to the peerage with the title Baron Bandon, of Bandonbridge, in the County of Cork, and in 1795, he was further ennobled as Viscount Bandon, of Bandonbridge, in the County of Cork. On 29 August 1800, he was finally advanced to the dignities of Earl of Bandon and Viscount Bernard. Bernard was one of the twenty eight original Irish representative peers and sat in the House of Lords between from 1801 until his death in 1830.

On 12 February 1784, Bernard married Catherine Henrietta Boyle, only daughter of the 2nd Earl of Shannon and Catherine Ponsonby. They had five sons and four daughters. He died aged 75 at Castle Bernard and was succeeded in his titles by his eldest son James.

Parliament of Ireland
Preceded by William Burton; Sir Lucius O'Brien, 3rd Bt	Member of Parliament for Ennis; 1778–1783; With: William Burton	Succeeded by Stewart Weldon; John Thomas Foster
Preceded by William Brabazon Ponsonby; Lodge Evans Morres	Member of Parliament for Bandonbridge; 1783–1790; With: Lodge Evans Morres	Succeeded by Broderick Chinnery; Lodge Evans Morres
Parliament of the United Kingdom
New title	Representative peer for Ireland; 1800–1830	Succeeded by The Marquess of Westmeath
Peerage of Ireland
New creation	Earl of Bandon; 1800–1830	Succeeded by James Bernard
New creation	Viscount Bandon; 1795–1830	Succeeded by James Bernard
New creation	Baron Bandon; 1793–1830	Succeeded by James Bernard
