= 1818 United Kingdom general election =

- 17 June – 18 July 1818

All 658 seats in the House of Commons 330 seats needed for a majority
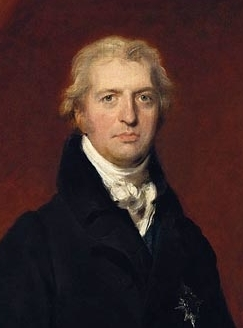

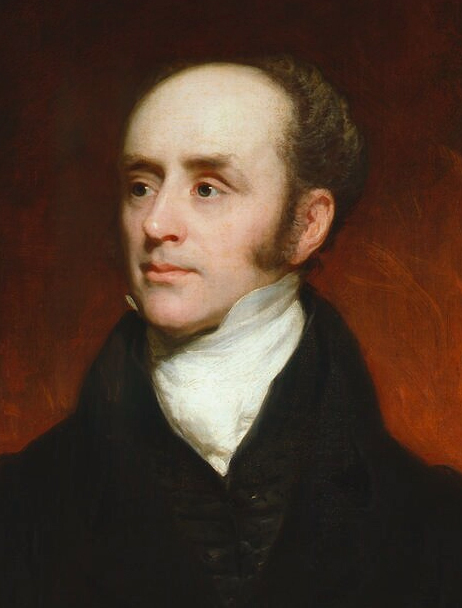
	First party	Second party
Leader	Earl of Liverpool	Earl Grey
Party	Tory (Pittite)	Whig
Leader since	8 June 1812	—
Last election	399	196
Seats won	280	175
Seat change	▼120	▼21
- Composition of the House of Commons after the election
Prime Minister before election
Earl of Liverpool
Tory
Prime Minister after election
Earl of Liverpool
Tory

The 1818 United Kingdom general election was the 5th general election after the Acts of Union 1800, held on 17 June 1818 to 18 July 1818. It saw the Whigs gain a few seats, but the Tories under the Earl of Liverpool retained a majority of around 90 seats. The Whigs were divided over their response to growing social unrest and the introduction of the Corn Laws.

The fifth United Kingdom Parliament was dissolved on 10 June 1818. The new Parliament was summoned to meet on 4 August 1818, for a maximum seven-year term from that date. The maximum term could be and normally was curtailed, by the monarch dissolving the Parliament, before its term expired. The sixth Parliament lasted only about a year and a half, as King George III's death on 29 January 1820 triggered a dissolution of Parliament.

== Political situation ==
The Tory leader was the Earl of Liverpool, who had been prime minister since his predecessor's assassination in 1812. The Tory Leader of the House of Commons was Robert Stewart, Viscount Castlereagh.

The Whig Party had long suffered from weak leadership, particularly in the House of Commons.

At the time of the general election, the Earl Grey was the leading figure amongst the Whig peers. The last Whig Prime Minister, the Lord Grenville, had retired from active politics in 1817. It was likely that Earl Grey would have been invited to form a government, had the Whigs come to power, although in this era the monarch rather than the governing party decided which individual would be prime minister.

The Leader of the Opposition in the House of Commons, until his death in 1817, was George Ponsonby, Lady Grey's uncle. About a year after Ponsonby's death, George Tierney reluctantly became the recognised Leader of the Opposition in the House of Commons. However, after 1819 he did not carry out the functions of leader although he retained the title.

== Summary of the constituencies ==
Monmouthshire (1 County constituency with 2 MPs and one single member Borough constituency) is included in Wales in these tables. Sources for this period may include the county in England.

Table 1: Constituencies and MPs, by type and country

Country	BC	CC	UC	Total C	BMP	CMP	UMP	Total MPs
England	202	39	2	243	404	78	4	486
Wales	13	13	0	26	13	14	0	27
Scotland	15	30	0	45	15	30	0	45
Ireland	33	32	1	66	35	64	1	100
Total	263	114	3	380	467	176	5	658

Table 2: Number of seats per constituency, by type and country

Country	BCx1	BCx2	BCx4	CCx1	CCx2	UCx1	UCx2	Total C
England	4	196	2	0	39	0	2	243
Wales	13	0	0	12	1	0	0	26
Scotland	15	0	0	30	0	0	0	45
Ireland	31	2	0	0	32	1	0	66
Total	63	198	2	42	72	1	2	380

== See also ==
- United Kingdom general elections
