= Nicholas Leader (born 1808) =

Irish politician

Nicholas Leader MP

Member of Parliament for County Cork
- In office 28 February 1861 – 30 November 1868 Serving with Arthur-Smith Barry (1867–1868); George Richard Barry (1865–1867); Vincent Scully (1861–1865)
- Preceded by: Rickard Deasy; Vincent Scully
- Succeeded by: Arthur-Smith Barry; McCarthy Downing

Personal details
- Born: 1808
- Died: 31 March 1880 (aged 71–72)
- Party: Conservative

Nicholas Philpot Leader (1808 – 31 March 1880) was an Irish Conservative politician.

After unsuccessfully contesting the seat at the 1841 general election and a by-election in 1847, he was elected MP for County Cork at a by-election in 1861 and held the seat until 1868.

Parliament of the United Kingdom
Preceded by Rickard Deasy; Vincent Scully	Member of Parliament for County Cork; 1861 – 1868; With: Arthur-Smith Barry (1867–1868); George Richard Barry (1865–1867); Vincent Scully (1861–1865)	Succeeded by Arthur-Smith Barry; McCarthy Downing
