= Deasy =

Deasy is a surname of Irish origin, known as Déiseach in Irish.

There were 973 people recorded with the surname Deasy in the 1901 Irish census. Alternative spellings of Deacy and Deasey were less frequent, featuring 169 and 50 times respectively

The name is featured in James Joyce's book Ulysses. At the time of publication the surname was mainly concentrated in County Waterford and in West Cork.

== Notable Deasys ==
- Austin Deasy (1936–2017) - Irish politician, who was minister for agriculture from 1982 to 1987.
- Bill Deasy - American singer-songwriter, recording artist and author
- Conor Deasy - Singer with The Thrills
- Daniel Deasy (b.1966) - Democratic member of the Pennsylvania House of Representatives
- Henry Hugh Peter Deasy (1866-1947) - automotive pioneer.
- John Deasy (b.1967) - Irish politician
- Liam Deasy (1896–1974) - Irish Republican Army officer during war of independence
- Mike Deasy (b.1941) - Guitarist and member of The Wrecking Crew
- Richard Deasy (1812–1883) - Irish lawyer and judge who sought to reform tenants' rights. Friend and ally of Daniel O'Connell.
- Rickard Deasy (1916–1999) - Irish Farmers' rights campaigner
- Timothy Deasy (1839–1880) - Captain in the Irish Republican Brotherhood. One of several Fenians prisoners rescued from a prison van in Manchester in 1867.
- Tim Deasy (b.1985) - English footballer
