= Nicholas Leader =

Nicholas Leader may refer to:

- Nicholas Leader (born 1773), Irish landowner, politician and businessman, Liberal MP for Kilkenny City 1830–1832
- His son Nicholas Leader (born 1808), Irish landowner, politician and businessman, Conservative MP for Cork County 1861–1868
