= 1879 County Cork by-election =

UK Parliamentary by-election

The 1879 County Cork by-election was fought on 17 February 1879. The by-election was fought due to the death of the incumbent Home Rule MP, McCarthy Downing. It was won by the Home Rule candidate David la Touche Colthurst.

The main issues were Home Rule and fixed tenure for tenant farmers, with the Home Rule candidate (a Catholic convert) being backed by the Catholic church.

1879 County Cork by-election
Party	Candidate	Votes	%	±%
Home Rule	Colonel David la Touche Colthurst	8,157	80.1	N/A
Conservative	George Colthurst	2,027	19.9	New
Majority		6,130	60.2	N/A
Turnout		10,184	66.3	N/A
Home Rule hold		Swing	N/A	
