= Earl of Shannon =

Title in the peerage of Ireland

- Arms: Parted per bend embattled Gules and Argent, a crescent for difference.
- Creation date: 17 April 1756
- Created by: George II
- Peerage: Ireland
- First holder: Henry Boyle
- Present holder: Henry Boyle, 10th Earl of Shannon
- Heir presumptive: Robert Francis Boyle
- Remainder to: Heirs male of the first earl's body lawfully begotten
- Subsidiary titles: Viscount Boyle of Bandon; Baron of Castle Martyr; Baron Carleton
- Former seats: Shannon Park; Castle Martyr
- Motto: VIVIT POST FUNERA VIRTUS (Virtue lives after death); SPECTEMUR AGENDO (Let us be judged by our actions)

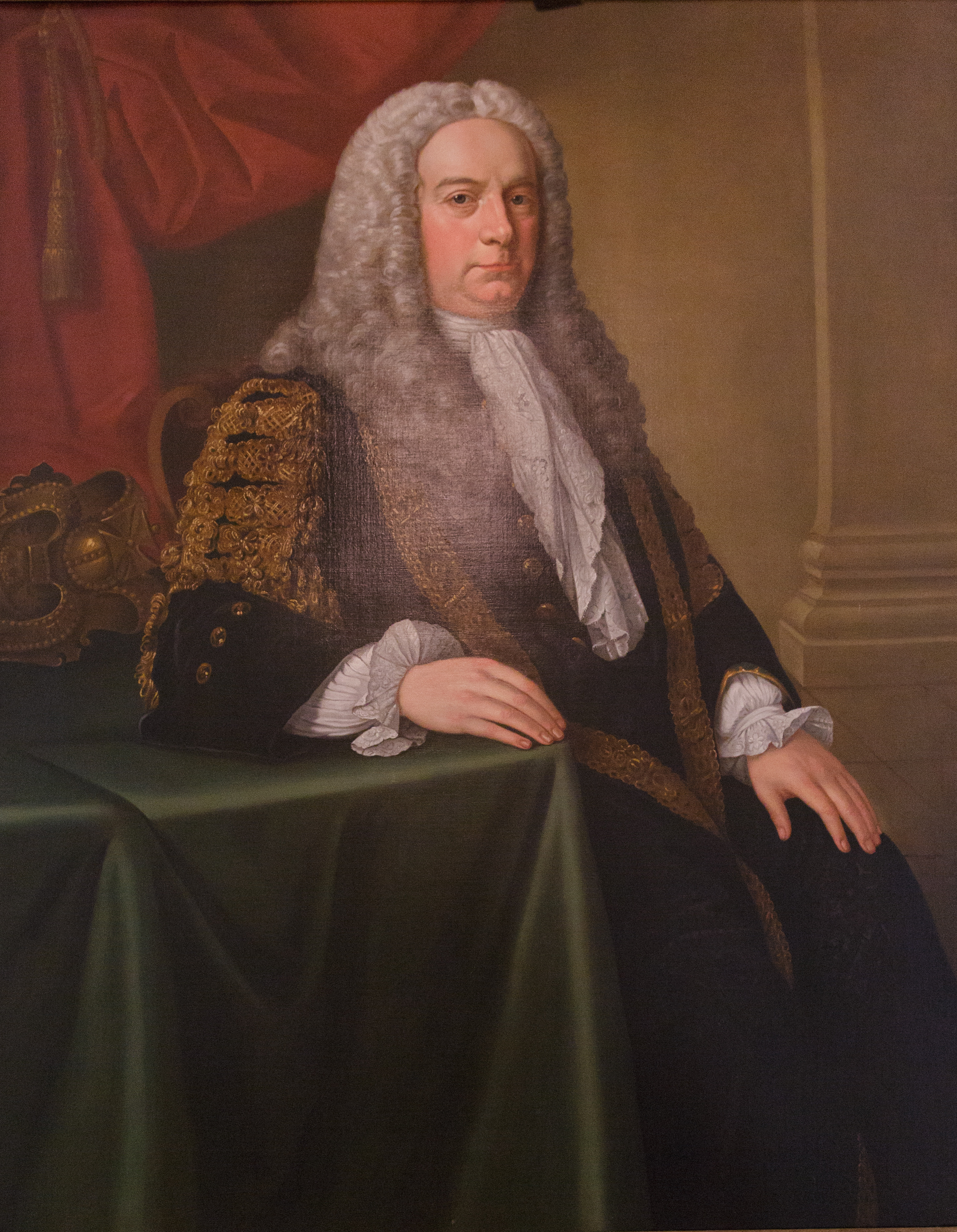
Henry Boyle, 1st Earl of Shannon.

Earl of Shannon is a title in the Peerage of Ireland. It was created in 1756 for the prominent Irish politician Henry Boyle, who served as Speaker of the Irish House of Commons and as Chancellor of the Irish Exchequer. The earldom is named after Shannon Park in County Cork.

The first Earl was made Viscount Boyle, of Bandon, and Baron Castle Martyr at the same time, also in the Peerage of Ireland. Lord Shannon was the second son of Henry Boyle, second son of Roger Boyle, 1st Earl of Orrery, third surviving son of Richard Boyle, 1st Earl of Cork. He was succeeded by his son, the second Earl.

He served as Master-General of the Ordnance for Ireland and as Vice-Treasurer for Ireland. In 1786 he was created Baron Carleton, of Carleton in the County of York, in the Peerage of Great Britain. This title gave him and the later Earls an automatic seat in the British House of Lords. The third Earl, son of the second, notably served as Lord Lieutenant of County Cork. On his death the titles passed to his son, the fourth Earl, who briefly represented County Cork in the House of Commons.

As of 2019, the titles are held by the fourth Earl's great-great-great-grandson, the tenth Earl, who succeeded his father in 2013.

The Honourable Sir Algernon Boyle, sixth son of the fifth Earl, was an admiral in the Royal Navy.

The family seat was Castle Martyr (or Castlemartyr) in Castlemartyr, County Cork, which was the ancient seat of the FitzGeralds.

== Earls of Shannon (1756) ==
- Henry Boyle, 1st Earl of Shannon (1682–1764)
- Richard Boyle, 2nd Earl of Shannon (1728–1807)
- Henry Boyle, 3rd Earl of Shannon (1771–1842)
- Richard Boyle, 4th Earl of Shannon (1809–1868)
- Henry Bentinck Boyle, 5th Earl of Shannon (1833–1890)
- Richard Henry Boyle, 6th Earl of Shannon (1860–1906)
- Richard Bernard Boyle, 7th Earl of Shannon (1897–1917)
- Robert Henry Boyle, 8th Earl of Shannon (1900–1963)
- Richard Bentinck Boyle, 9th Earl of Shannon (1924–2013)
- (Richard) Henry John Boyle, 10th Earl of Shannon (born 1960), known as Harry Boyle

== Present peer ==
(Richard) Henry John Boyle, 10th Earl of Shannon (born 19 January 1960), also known as Harry Boyle, is the son of the 9th Earl and his wife Susan Margaret Rogers Hogg. Between 1963 and 2013 he was known formally as Viscount Boyle.

In 2003, he was living at Edington House, Bridgwater, Somerset. On 9 May 2013 he succeeded as Earl of Shannon, Viscount Boyle, Baron Castle Martyr, and Baron Carleton.

As of 2023, Shannon is unmarried, and the heir presumptive is his second cousin once removed, Robert Francis Boyle (born 1930), a grandson of a younger son of the 5th Earl.

== Title succession chart ==
Title succession chart

Title succession chart, Barons Castle Martyr, Viscounts Boyle, and Earls of Shannon.

Henry Boyle; 1st Earl of Shannon; 1682–1764
Baron Carleton [GB]
Richard Boyle; 2nd Earl of Shannon; 1728–1807
Henry Boyle; 3rd Earl of Shannon; 1771–1842
Richard Boyle; 1802 – c. 1803	Richard Boyle; 4th Earl of Shannon; 1809–1868
Henry Boyle; 5th Earl of Shannon; 1833–1890
Richard Boyle; 6th Earl of Shannon; 1860–1906	Hon. Henry Boyle; 1862–1908	V. Adm. Hon. Robert Boyle; 1863–1922
Hon. Richard Boyle; 1896–1896	Richard Boyle; 7th Earl of Shannon; 1897–1917	Robert Boyle; 8th Earl of Shannon; 1900–1963	Cdr. Vivian Boyle; 1902–1962
Richard Boyle; 9th Earl of Shannon; 1924–2013	Robert Boyle born 1930
Richard Boyle; 10th Earl of Shannon born 1960	David Boyle born 1959
Liam Boyle born 2001

== Line of succession ==
Line of succession
- Henry Boyle, 5th Earl of Shannon (1833–1890)
  - Richard Boyle, 6th Earl of Shannon (1860–1906)
    - Robert Boyle, 8th Earl of Shannon (1900–1963)
      - Richard Boyle, 9th Earl of Shannon (1924–2013)
        - Richard Boyle, 10th Earl of Shannon (born 1960)
  - Hon. Robert Francis Boyle (1863–1922)
    - Vivien Francis Boyle (1902–1962)
      - (1) Robert Francis Boyle (born 1930)
        - (2) David de Crespigny Boyle (born 1959)
          - (3) Liam Francis Paton Boyle (born 2001)
        - (4) Robert Andrew Boyle (born 1961)
  - Hon. Edward Spencer Harry Boyle (1870–1937)
    - Patrick Spencer Boyle (1906–1978)
      - Michael Patrick Radcliffe Boyle (1934–2011)
        - (5) Robert Algernon Radcliffe Boyle (born 1963)
          - (6) George Patrick Radcliffe Boyle (born 1998)
        - (7) Rupert Alexander Boyle (born 1968)
      - David Spencer Boyle (1942–2023)
        - (8) James Patrick William Boyle (born 1983)

== See also ==
- Earl of Orrery
- Earl of Cork
