= Richard Longfield =

Irish politician

Richard Longfield (7 May 1802 – 18 June 1889) was an Irish Member of Parliament.

He was born the eldest son of John and Eleanor (née Lucas) Longfield of Longueville.

He was appointed High Sheriff of County Cork for 1833–34, an office that had also been held (1829–30) by his father.

He sat as a Conservative in the British House of Commons for County Cork from 1835 to 1837. Having successfully petitioned against the re-election in January 1835 of the radical Repeal MP Feargus O'Connor, on the grounds that O'Connor failed the property qualification then required of MPs, Longfield took the seat on 5 June.

He married twice;firstly Harriett Elizabeth, the daughter of John M'Clintock, with whom he had one son (killed in the Crimea) and secondly Jemima Lucy, the daughter of Wyrley Birch of Norfolk, with whom he had three sons and two daughters.

A relation, also named Richard Longfield (1734–1811), had sat in the Irish House of Commons for Charleville in County Cork (1761–68), for Cork City (1776–83 and 1790–96), and for Baltimore, County Cork (1783-1790), before becoming the first and last holder of the titles of Baron Longueville and Viscount Longueville in the Irish peerage; he had also been High Sheriff of the County (1758–61). Another relation, Mountifort Longfield, was the last to hold the Irish seat of Cork City before it ceased to exist with the Act of Union 1800.

Parliament of the United Kingdom
Preceded by Feargus O'Connor; Viscount Boyle	Member of Parliament for County Cork; 1835–1837; With: Garrett Standish Barry 1835–1837	Succeeded by Edmond Roche; Garrett Standish Barry
Legal offices
Preceded by Richard Oliver Aldworth	High Sheriff of County Cork; 1833–1834	Succeeded by William Hare, 2nd Earl of Listowel
