= Vincent Scully (disambiguation) =

Vincent Scully (1920–2017) was an American art historian.

Vincent Scully may also refer to:

- Vincent Scully (MP) (1810–1871), Irish politician
- Vin Scully (1927–2022), American sportscaster

== See also ==
- Vin Skully or Jason Rabinowitz, member of American hip-hop collective Styles of Beyond
