= Henry Boyle, 5th Earl of Shannon =

Henry Bentinck Boyle, 5th Earl of Shannon (22 November 1833 in London – 8 February 1890 in Castlemartyr), styled Viscount Boyle from 1842–68, was an Irish peer.

== Family ==
He was a son of Richard Boyle, 4th Earl of Shannon and his wife Emily Henrietta Seymour. Richard served as a Member of Parliament, representing the County Cork constituency in the House of Commons from 1830 to 1832. Richard was a member of the Whig faction. Emily was a daughter of Lord George Seymour and Isabella Hamilton.

George Seymour was a son of Francis Seymour-Conway, 1st Marquess of Hertford and his wife Lady Isabella Fitzroy. Isabella Hamilton was a daughter of the Reverend George Hamilton, Canon of Windsor (1718–1787) and his wife Elizabeth Onslow.

Isabella Fitzroy was a daughter of Charles FitzRoy, 2nd Duke of Grafton and his wife Lady Henrietta Somerset. George Hamilton was a son of James Hamilton, 7th Earl of Abercorn and his wife Anne Plumer. Elizabeth Onslow was a daughter of Richard Onslow, Governor of Plymouth and his second wife Pooley Walton.

Henrietta Somerset was a daughter of Charles Somerset, Marquess of Worcester and his wife Rebecca Child. Anne Plumer was a daughter of John Plumer and Mary Hale. Her father was a Member of the Parliament, representing Hertfordshire in the Parliament of England. The Plumers originated in Old Windsor, claiming descent from an Anglo-Saxon knight. However, their pedigree as preserved in the College of Arms only dates to the Elizabethan era. By that time the family already held significant wealth. John Plumer was also High Sheriff of Hertfordshire in 1689, appointed during the reign of William III and Mary II. He was a Whig Parliamentary candidate in 1698, defeated by Ralph Freman and Thomas Halsey. Both his rivals were Tories. He was again a candidate in the 1708 election, again failing to win against Freman and Halsey. He was supported by most of the local gentry but had little support among others eligible to vote. Jonathan Swift records the arranged marriage of Anne to the Earl of Abercorn in "The Journal to Stella", placing it in 1711. Stella was his nickname for Esther Johnson. In an entry dated 2 March 1711, Swift reports "I dined with Lord Abercorn, whose son Peasley will be married at Easter to ten thousand pounds." The Lord Abercorn mentioned here was Anne's father-in-law, James Hamilton, 6th Earl of Abercorn. "Peasley" is a reference to the title "Lord Paisley", a courtesy title used at the time for the eldest son of each Duke of Abercorn. The ten thousand pounds were the dowry of Anne. John Plumer is later noted granting refuge to Jane Wenham, subject of a witch trial, at his estate, New Place at Gilston. New Place had been built by Henry Chauncy in 1550. John Plumer purchased the estate in 1701. Plumer died in 1718 and his estates were inherited by his son William Plumer (c. 1686 – 1767).

William also served as M.P later in life. Pooley Walton was a daughter of Charles Walton of Little Bursted, Essex. Her paternal uncle Sir George Walton was a Vice Admiral of the Royal Navy.

Rebecca Child was a daughter of Josiah Child, governor of the Honourable East India Company and his second wife Mary Atwood. Her maternal grandfather William Atwood was also a merchant.

== Life account ==
He was educated at Eton College and then joined the service of the Foreign Office. In 1852, Boyle was appointed Attaché to the British envoy at Frankfurt am Main, a Free imperial city maintaining its independence. Frankfurt was at the time a member of the German Confederation and served as the seat of its Bundesversammlung. From 1852 to 1853, Boyle served as Attaché to the British embassy at Vienna, capital of the Austrian Empire.

His father died on 1 August 1868. Henry inherited his title and the estates associated with it. He held said title and estates until his own death.

On 22 February 1871 he was appointed the Honorary Colonel of the West Cork Artillery Militia in succession to his father. The regiment was later designated the 2nd Brigade, South Irish Division, Royal Artillery.

== Marriages and children ==
On 12 July 1859, Shannon married his first wife Lady Blanche Emma Lascelles. She was a daughter of Henry Lascelles, 3rd Earl of Harewood and his wife Lady Louisa Thynne. They had three sons:

- Richard Henry Boyle, 6th Earl of Shannon (15 May 1860 – 11 December 1906), Lieutenant of the Rifle Brigade from 1880 to 1882. Moved to Canada in 1883, establishing his own ranch there. Later served in the Parliament of Canada. Also a Captain of The Rocky Mountain Rangers.
- Hon. Henry George Boyle (10 February 1862 – 16 December 1908), Lieutenant of the 3rd Battalion, Yorkshire Regiment.
- Hon. Robert Francis Boyle (12 December 1863 – 11 December 1922), Vice Admiral of the Royal Navy, served in World War I.

Blanche died on 26 December 1863, two weeks after giving birth to her last son. On 14 January 1868, Shannon married his second wife, Julia Charlotte Cradock-Hartopp. She was a daughter of William Edmund Cradock-Hartopp, 3rd Baronet, High Sheriff of Warwickshire and his wife Jane Mary Keane. They had three sons:

- Hon. Walter John Harry Boyle (11 March 1869 – 24 February 1939), Senior Official Receiver of the Insolvency Service from 1922 to 1934. He married Ethel Horatia, daughter of Captain Edward Rowe Fisher-Rowe and Lady Victoria Isabella Liddell. Lady Victoria was daughter of Henry Liddell, 1st Earl of Ravensworth and Isabella Horatia Saymour.
- Hon. Edward Spencer Harry Boyle (8 October 1870 – 8 October 1937), Captain of the Royal Navy, served in the Second Boer War. Acting Commander of the Royal Naval College, Osborne from 1914 to 1918.
- Hon. Sir Algernon Douglas Edward Harry Boyle (21 October 1871 – 13 October 1949), Vice Admiral of the Royal Navy. Member of the Royal Victorian Order in 1901, Companion of the Order of St Michael and St George in 1918, Knight Commander of the Order of the Bath in 1924. Served in First World War. Aide-de-camp to George V of the United Kingdom from 1918 to 1919. Fourth Sea Lord from 1920 to 1924.

Peerage of Ireland
Preceded by Richard Boyle	Earl of Shannon; 1868–1890	Succeeded by Richard Henry Boyle
