= Battle of Rathangan =

Battle of the Irish Rebellion of 1798

Coordinates: 53.22163°N 6.99730°W

- Part of the United Irishmen Rebellion
Date	24–28 May 1798
Location	Rathangan, County Kildare
Result	British victory, rebels repulsed 28 May

Belligerents
Ireland (Nationalist)	Great Britain (Kingdom of Ireland) Irish loyalists

Commanders and leaders
Captain Doorley	Captain James Spencer; Lieutenant-Colonel Stephen Mahon

Casualties and losses
300 killed	3–20 killed

The Battle of Rathangan was a military engagement between the forces of the British Crown and the United Irishmen during the 1798 rebellion.

On 24 May 1798 a group of rebels from the United Irishmen led by a Captain Doorley attacked the town of Rathangan, County Kildare, which was being defended by a small corps of yeomanry led by Captain James Spencer; the rebels held the town for four days. On 28 May 1798 the Royal Cork City Militia and two squadrons of the 7th Dragoon Guards were sent to re-capture the town. The 7th DG's commanding officer, Lieutenant-Colonel Stephen Mahon, took one squadron into the town while the other waited outside. A pitched battle then took place with heavy losses on both sides.
