= Arthur Smith-Barry, 1st Baron Barrymore =

Anglo-Irish politician (1843–1925)

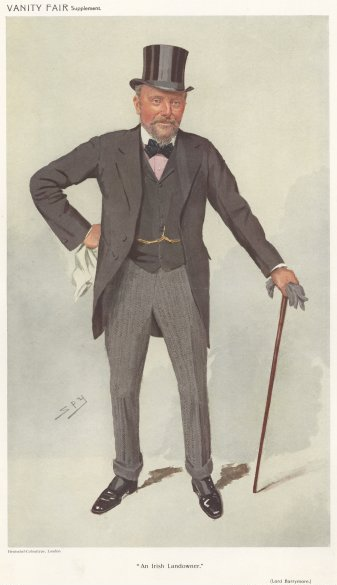
"An Irish Landowner". Lord Barrymore as caricatured by Spy (Leslie Ward) in Vanity Fair, August 1910

Arthur Hugh Smith-Barry, 1st Baron Barrymore, PC (Ire) (17 January 1843 – 22 February 1925), was an Anglo-Irish Conservative politician.

== Background and education ==
Smith-Barry was the son of James Hugh Smith Barry, of Marbury, Cheshire, and Fota Island, County Cork, and his wife Eliza, daughter of Shallcross Jacson. His paternal grandfather John Smith Barry was the illegitimate son of James Hugh Smith Barry, son of John Smith Barry, younger son of Lieutenant-General The 4th Earl of Barrymore (a title which had become extinct in 1823; see Earl of Barrymore). He was educated at Eton and Christ Church, Oxford.

== Political career ==
Smith-Barry entered Parliament as one of two representatives for County Cork in 1867, a seat he held until 1874. Smith-Barry remained out of the House of Commons for the next twelve years but returned in 1886 when he was elected for Huntingdon, and represented this constituency until 1900. He was also High Sheriff of County Cork in 1886 and was tasked by Arthur Balfour to organise landlord resistance to the tenant Plan of Campaign movement of the late 1880s. He was sworn of the Privy Council of Ireland in 1896. It was announced in the 1902 Coronation Honours list that he would be created a peer, and the Barrymore title held by his ancestors was partially revived when he was raised to the peerage as Baron Barrymore, of Barrymore in the County of Cork, on 24 July 1902. He took his seat in the House of Lords a couple of days later.

== Cricket ==
Smith-Barry played two first-class cricket matches for the Marylebone Cricket Club, playing once in 1873 and once in 1875.

== Family ==
Lord Barrymore married firstly Lady Mary Frances, daughter of The 3rd Earl of Dunraven and Mount-Earl, in 1868. Their children were:

- Geraldine Smith-Barry, born 9 Jun 1869 at 26 Chesham Place in London, died 23 Dec 1957
- James Hugh Smith-Barry, born 22 Oct 1870 on Fota Island, died 18 May 1871

After his wife's death on 11 Sep 1884 (in Bex, Switzerland). He then married Elizabeth, daughter of U.S. General James S. Wadsworth and widow of Arthur Post, on 28 Feb 1889. They had one child together:

- Dorothy Elizabeth Smith-Barry, born 14 Apr 1894, d. 16 Jan 1975

Lord Barrymore died in London in February 1925, aged 82, and was cremated at Golders Green Crematorium. His only son James had died as an infant in 1871 and consequently the barony became extinct on Barrymore's death. Lady Barrymore died on 9 May 1930 in London.

On the death of Arthur Hugh Smith Barry in 1925, the estate, which was entailed, passed to his brother, James Hugh Smith Barry. On his death, it passed to James Hugh's son, Robert Raymond Smith-Barry. In 1939, the estate of Fota Island and the ground rents of areas was acquired by Arthur Hugh's daughter (from her cousin), Mrs. Dorothy Bell, for the sum of £31,000. On her death, in 1975, it passed to her daughter, Mrs. Rosemary Villiers, and Fota House is now the property of The Irish Heritage Trust.

== Arms ==
Coat of arms of Arthur Smith-Barry, 1st Baron Barrymore

Notes
Confirmed by Sir Arthur Vicars, Ulster King of Arms, 6 September 1902.
Crest
On a wreath of the colours a castle Argent issuant from the battlements thereof a wolf's head Sable charged on the beck with a cross pattee fitchee Or for difference.
Escutcheon
Quarterly first and fourth Argent three bars gemelle Gules (Barry) second and third grandquarterly 1st & 4th Gules on a chevron Or between three bezants as many crosses pattee fitchee Sable (Smith) 2nd & 3rd Azure a fess Argent between three porcupines Or (Heiry) the whole within a bordure compony Ermine and Gules.
Motto
Boutey En A Avant

== See also ==
- Earl of Barrymore

Parliament of the United Kingdom
Preceded by Nicholas Leader; George Richard Barry	Member of Parliament for County Cork; 1867–1874; With: Nicholas Leader 1867–1868; McCarthy Downing 1868–1874	Succeeded by McCarthy Downing; William Shaw
Preceded by Thomas Coote	Member of Parliament for Huntingdon; 1886–1900	Succeeded by George Montagu
Party political offices
Preceded by Marquess of Granby	Chairman of the National Union of Conservative and Constitutional Associations; 1897	Succeeded by Sir Benjamin Stone
Peerage of the United Kingdom
New creation	Baron Barrymore; 1902–1925	Extinct
