= David la Touche Colthurst =

Irish politician

David Colthurst MP

Member of Parliament for County Cork
- In office 17 February 1879 – 24 November 1885 Serving with William Shaw
- Preceded by: McCarthy Downing
- Succeeded by: Constituency abolished

Personal details
- Born: 1828
- Died: 19 January 1907 (aged 78–79)
- Party: Home Rule League

David la Touche Colthurst (1828 – 19 January 1907) was an Irish Home Rule League politician. He was elected Home Rule Member of Parliament (MP) for County Cork at the 1879 by-election, and remained MP until the seat was abolished in 1885. He was the son of Sir Nicholas Colthurst, 4th Baronet, Member of Parliament (MP) for Cork City 1812–1829.

Parliament of the United Kingdom
Preceded by McCarthy Downing	Member of Parliament for County Cork; 1879 – 1885; With: William Shaw	Constituency abolished
