= Edmond Roche, 1st Baron Fermoy =

Irish politician (1815–1874)

The Right Honourable The Lord Fermoy
- 1st Baron Fermoy
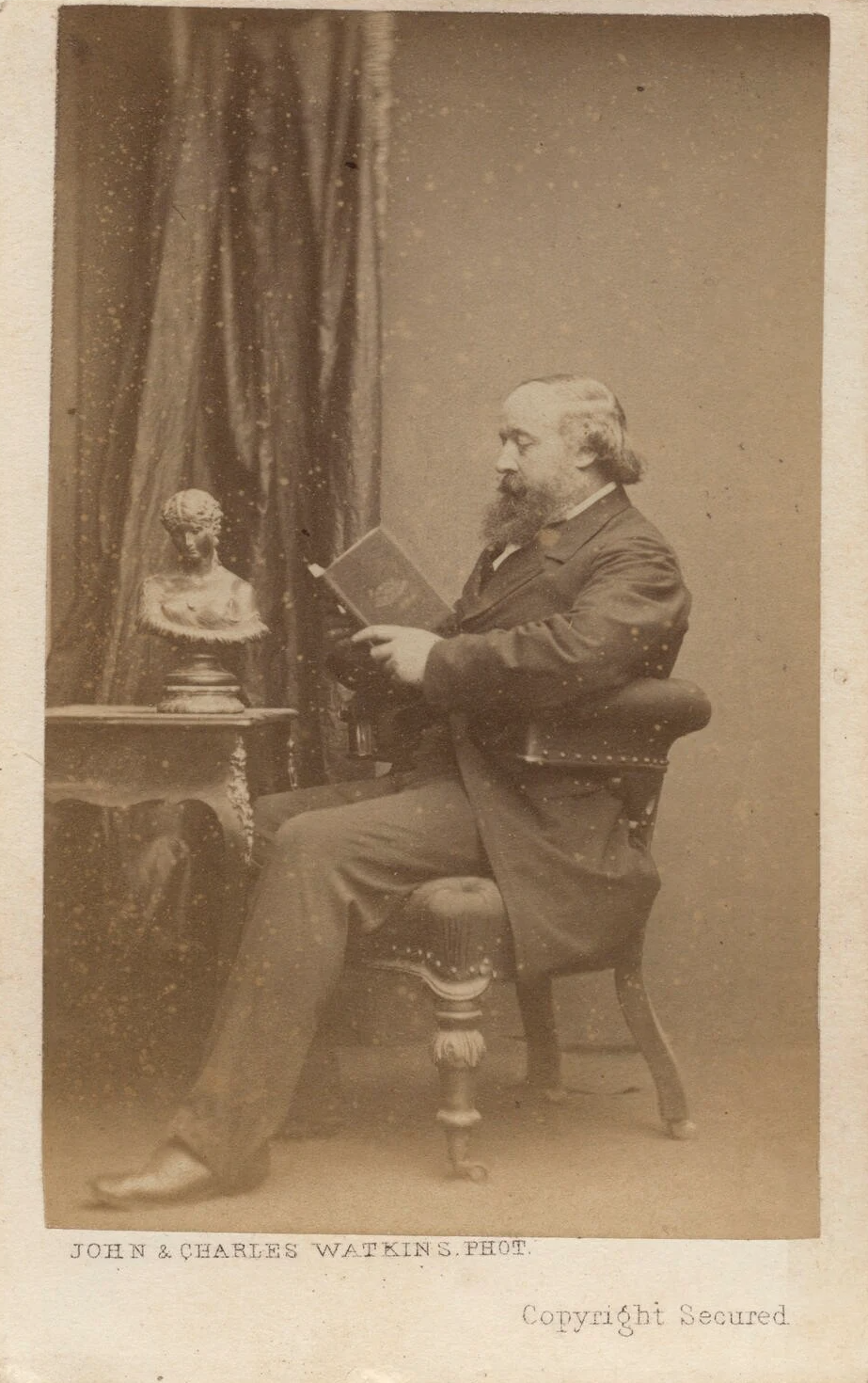
- Tenure: 1856–1874
- Successor: Edward Roche, 2nd Baron Fermoy
- Born: Edmond Burke Roche; 9 August 1815; County Cork, Ireland
- Died: 17 September 1874 (aged 59); Trabolgan, County Cork, Ireland
- Offices: Lord Lieutenant of County Cork
- Spouse: Elizabeth Caroline Boothby (m. 1848)
- Parents: Edward Roche; Margaret Honoria Curtain

Edmond Burke Roche, 1st Baron Fermoy (9 August 1815 – 17 September 1874), was an Irish politician in the Parliament of the United Kingdom who was granted a title in the Peerage of Ireland. His direct ancestor was Maurice FitzEdmund Roche, Mayor of Cork, who died in 1593.

== Early life and career ==
Edmond Roche was born on 9 August 1815 in County Cork, Ireland, the son of Edward Roche (1771–1855) and his wife, Margaret Honoria Curtain (1786–1862). He was named in honour of his distant relative, Edmund Burke (1729–1797).

He was elected to the British House of Commons for County Cork in 1837, a seat he held until 1855 (Repeal, later Whig), and then represented Marylebone between 1859 and 1865 (Liberal). From 1856 to 1874, he also served as Lord Lieutenant of County Cork, and was appointed Honorary Colonel of the North Cork Rifles militia regiment on 27 September 1871.

== Peerage ==
In 1855, he was raised to the Peerage of Ireland as Baron Fermoy by Queen Victoria. After the letters patent were ruled invalid in 1856, the title was granted to him again by new letters patent. After his death in 1874, he was succeeded in the barony by his elder son, Edward Roche, 2nd Baron Fermoy (1850–1920). James Roche, 3rd Baron Fermoy (1852–1920), who briefly succeeded his sonless brother in September 1920, was his younger son.

== Personal life ==
On 22 August 1848, the then Edmond Roche married Elizabeth Caroline Boothby (1821–1897), daughter of James Brownell Boothby (1791–1850), of Twyford Abbey, and his wife Charlotte Cunningham (1799–1893). They had eight children:

- Edward Roche, 2nd Baron Fermoy (1850–1920), who married The Hon. Cecilia O'Grady, daughter of Standish O'Grady, 3rd Viscount Guillamore.
- James Roche, 3rd Baron Fermoy (1852–1920), who married Frances Ellen Work (1857–1947) in 1880. They divorced in 1891.
- The Hon. Alexis Charles Burke Roche (1853–1914), who married The Hon. Lucy Maud Goschen, daughter of the 1st Viscount Goschen
- The Hon. Eleanor Charlotte Burke Roche (1854–1938), who married William Nicholas Leader
- The Hon. Ulick de Rupe Burke Roche (1856–1919)
- The Hon. Elizabeth Caroline Burke Roche (1857–1940), who married German aristocrat Count Friedrich Maximilian von Hochberg (1868–1921), brother of Count Hans Heinrich XV of Hochberg, Prince of Pless (1861–1938), in 1905.
- The Hon. Edmund Burke Roche (1859–1948)
- The Hon. Ethel Kathleen Burke Roche (1861-1935), who married in 1891 Norman Maclean, son of the Hon. John Donald Maclean MLA, Colonial Treasurer of Queensland

He died on 17 September 1874 at his residence Trabolgan House, County Cork, aged 59, and was buried in a mausoleum in Corkbeg graveyard, Whitegate, County Cork. His grandson Edmund, 4th Baron Fermoy (1885–1955), was the maternal grandfather of Diana, Princess of Wales.

== Ancestry ==
Ancestors of Edmond Roche, 1st Baron Fermoy

8. Edmund Roche
4. Edmund Roche
9. Barbara Henessey
2. Edward Roche (1771–1855)
10. George Coughlan
5. Frances Coughlan
1. Edmond Roche, 1st Baron Fermoy
12. Daniel Curtain
6. William Curtain
13. Margaret Nagle
3. Margaret Honoria Curtain (1786–1862)
14. Timothy Deasy
7. Margaret Deasey
15. Honoria O'Donovan

Parliament of the United Kingdom
Preceded by Garrett Standish Barry; Richard Longfield	Member of Parliament for County Cork; 1837–1855; With: Garrett Standish Barry 1837–1841; Daniel O'Connell 1841–1847; Maurice Power 1847–1852; Vincent Scully 1852–1855	Succeeded by Vincent Scully; Rickard Deasy
Preceded by Sir Benjamin Hall; Edwin James	Member of Parliament for Marylebone; 1859–1861; With: Edwin James 1859–1861; Harvey Lewis 1861–1865	Succeeded by Harvey Lewis; Sir Thomas Chambers
Honorary titles
Preceded by The Earl of Bandon	Lord Lieutenant of Cork; 1856–1874	Succeeded by The Earl of Bandon
Peerage of Ireland
New creation	Baron Fermoy; 1856–1874	Succeeded by Edward Roche
