= Alexander McCarthy =

Irish politician

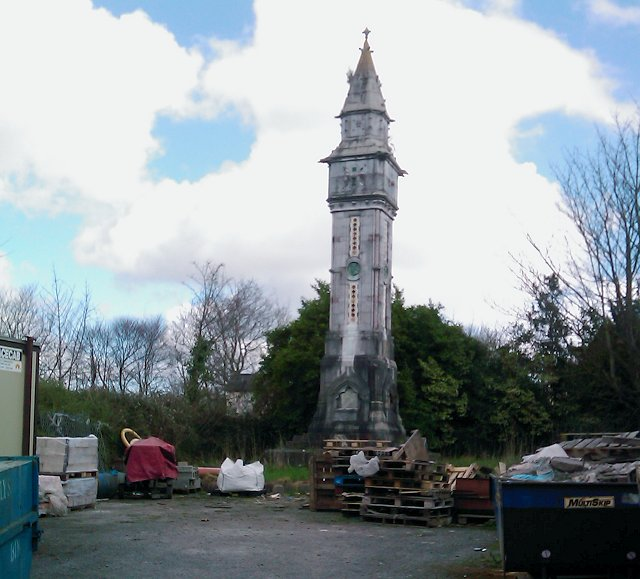
- McCarthy Monument in Ballintemple, designed by William Atkins for Alexander McCarthy

Member of Parliament for County Cork
- In office 10 April 1857 – 10 May 1859 Serving with Rickard Deasy
- Preceded by: Rickard Deasy; Vincent Scully
- Succeeded by: Rickard Deasy; Vincent Scully

Member of Parliament for Cork City
- In office 31 January 1846 – 9 August 1847 Serving with Daniel Callaghan
- Preceded by: Daniel Callaghan; Francis Murphy
- Succeeded by: Daniel Callaghan; William Trant Fagan

Personal details
- Born: 1801
- Died: 1868 (aged 66–67)
- Party: Liberal
- Other political affiliations: Independent Irish Party; Repeal Association

Alexander McCarthy (1801 – 1868) was an Irish Liberal, Independent Irish Party and Repeal Association politician.

McCarthy was first elected Repeal Association Member of Parliament (MP) for Cork City at a by-election in 1846 caused by the resignation of Francis Murphy. He held the seat until 1847 when he was defeated at that year's election. In 1856, he became High Sheriff of County Cork before returning to parliament for the county as an Independent Irish Party MP at the 1857 general election and held the seat until 1859; at that year's general election, he unsuccessfully fought Dublin City as a Liberal.

Parliament of the United Kingdom
Preceded by Daniel Callaghan; Francis Murphy	Member of Parliament for Cork City; 1846–1847; With: Daniel Callaghan	Succeeded by Daniel Callaghan; William Trant Fagan
Preceded by Rickard Deasy; Vincent Scully	Member of Parliament for County Cork; 1857–1859; With: Rickard Deasy	Succeeded by Rickard Deasy; Vincent Scully
