= Algernon Boyle =

Royal Navy Admiral (1871–1949)

Admiral The Honourable Sir Algernon Boyle KCB CMG MVO
- Born: Hon. Algernon Douglas Edward Harry Boyle; 21 October 1871; Belgravia, London
- Died: 13 October 1949 (aged 77); London, England
- Military career
- Allegiance: United Kingdom
- Branch: Royal Navy
- Service years: 1884–1924
- Rank: Admiral
- Commands: HMS Malaya
- Conflicts: World War I
- Awards: Knight Commander of the Order of the Bath; Companion of the Order of St Michael and St George; Member of the Royal Victorian Order

Admiral Sir Algernon Douglas Edward Harry Boyle KCB CMG MVO (21 October 1871 – 13 October 1949) was a Royal Navy officer who went on to be Fourth Sea Lord.

== Early life ==
Boyle was born at 37, Lowndes Street, Belgravia, the youngest son of Henry Boyle, 5th Earl of Shannon, and his second wife, Julia Cradock-Hartopp. He had two elder brothers and three elder half-brothers, including Richard Boyle, 6th Earl of Shannon.

== Naval career ==
Boyle joined the Royal Navy as a cadet on the training ship HMS Britannia in 1884. He was promoted to Commander on 1 January 1902, and in April that year was assigned for temporary duty at the Admiralty. Four months later, in August 1902, he was posted at the protected cruiser HMS Isis.

He served in World War I and, as Captain of HMS Malaya, took part in the Battle of Jutland in 1916. He was Aide-de-camp to the King from 1918 to 1919 and served as Fourth Sea Lord from 1920 to 1924. He retired in 1924. He was advanced to the rank of admiral on the Retired List on 5 April 1928.

He was appointed a Commander of the Order of the Bath (CB) in the 1916 New Year Honours and advanced to Knight Commander of the Order of the Bath (KCB) in the 1924 New Year Honours.

Military offices
Preceded by Sir Ernle Chatfield	Fourth Sea Lord; 1920–1924	Succeeded by Sir John Kelly
