= Maurice Power =

Anglo-Irish politician

Lieutenant Governor of St Lucia
- In office 1852–1855

Member of Parliament for County Cork
- In office 1847–1852
- Preceded by: Daniel O'Connell; Baron Fermoy
- Succeeded by: Baron Fermoy; Vincent Scully

Personal details
- Born: 14 May 1811 Skibbereen, County Cork, Ireland
- Died: 28 December 1870 (aged 59) Rushbrooke, County Cork, Ireland
- Spouse: Catherine Livingston (m. 1832)
- Relations: John Power (brother); Henry Brockholst Livingston (father-in-law); Thomas E. Davis (brother-in-law)
- Parent: Andrew Power
- Education: Stonyhurst College

Maurice Power (14 May 1811 – 28 December 1870) was an Anglo-Irish politician who served as member of parliament for County Cork (1847–1852) and as Lieutenant Governor of St Lucia from 1852.

== Early life ==
He was born in Deelish, Skibbereen, County Cork, the fourth son of Andrew Power. He was educated at Stonyhurst College and subsequently qualified as a doctor.

Two of Maurice Power's brothers were prominent members of the Irish-American community in New York: John Power was the Roman Catholic Pastor of St Peter's Lower Manhattan from 1819 to 1849 and Vicar General of the diocese of New York. He was the priest who married Maurice Power and Catherine Louise Livingston in 1832. His other brother, William, was a doctor who worked in the Irish community. Power's sister, Anne (d. 1895), also lived in New York and was the wife of property developer Thomas E. Davis.

== Career ==
Power returned to Ireland and became involved with local politics, supporting the Repeal Party. He was appointed a member of the Clonakilty bench of magistrates, but resigned in 1843 when a fellow magistrate was dismissed by the Lord Chancellor for attending a political meeting. He was reappointed in 1846 and became a magistrate in Cove.

=== Member of Parliament ===
In 1847, Daniel O'Connell, the member of parliament for County Cork died. Maurice Power was selected to stand as the Repeal Party candidate, winning the election and holding the seat until 1852.

=== Lieutenant Governor of St Lucia ===
In 1852, Power was appointed the Lieutenant-Governor for St Lucia. This was received with incredulity amongst those who had supported his election campaign. They believed that he had pledged not to take a government appointment, and that he was now being rewarded for supporting the ruling Whig party, in particular Lord Clarendon during the Birch affair. Power retired from his posting in St Lucia in 1855, moving to Freiburg in Prussia on health grounds. He returned to Cork in the early 1860s, purchasing Ringacoltig House and Estate, resuming interest in local politics.

== Personal life ==
Power travelled to America where he married Catherine Livingston (1815–1890) in 1832; she was the youngest daughter of Judge Henry Brockholst Livingston, an American Justice of the Supreme Court, and Catherine (née Seaman) Kortright. Catherine Power's brothers were Henry Brockholst Livingston (1819-1892) and Jasper Hall Livingston (1815-1900), who was her twin. Jasper married Matilda Anne Cecila Morris, the youngest daughter of Sir John Morris, 2nd Baronet of Clasemont and died in England. Henry married Marian Magdalen Gribaldo in Florence, Italy and is buried in the Swiss Protestant Cemetery of Florence.

Together, they were the parents of many children, including three daughters who married Prussians and lived in that country; as well as:

- Brockholst Livingston Power, a lieutenant in the Prussian army before joining the Federal army as a captain in the Corning Light Cavalry during the American Civil War.
- John Livingston Power, was a surgeon in the British Army who fought as a volunteer in the Franco-Prussian War. He died of cancer at Manheim, Germany, 25 Jan 1877 and was accorded a military funeral by the German officers of that garrison.
- Eliza Livingston Power (1839–1897), who married Hannibal, Freiherr von Schauenburg (1831–1906)
- Mary Power (1841–1921), who married Ludwig Freiherr Böcklin von Böcklinsau (1838–1922)
- Lucinda Frances Power (1850–1919), a twin who married Wilhelm Ludwig Ernst Leopold Emil, Freiherr Böcklin von Böcklinsau (1831–1905).
- Alice Mary Power (b. 1850), also a twin who married her cousin Edwin Brockholst Livingston (1852–1929), an amateur historian.

Powers died at Ringacoltig House on 28 December 1870, buried locally, although his remains were exhumed in the following year, and re-buried in the family plot in Rosscarbery.

=== Property ===
Power and his wife Catherine inherited a share of properties owned by Catherine's mother who died in 1859. The beneficiaries of the will included the surviving children from her marriage to Judge Brockholst Livingston and the earlier marriage to John Kortright. The properties amounted to 15 lots located in New York. Power also owner at least 2000 acres of land in Cork Ireland at the time of his death.

Parliament of the United Kingdom
Preceded by Daniel O'Connell; Edmond Roche	Member of Parliament for County Cork; 1847 – 1852; With: Edmond Roche	Succeeded by Edmond Roche; Vincent Scully
