= George Richard Barry =

Irish politician

George Richard Barry MP

Member of Parliament for County Cork
- In office 28 February 1861 – 30 November 1868 Serving with Nicholas Leader
- Preceded by: Nicholas Leader; Vincent Scully
- Succeeded by: Arthur-Smith Barry; Nicholas Leader

Personal details
- Born: 1825
- Died: 31 January 1867 (aged 41)
- Party: Liberal

George Richard Barry (1825 – 31 January 1867) was an Irish Liberal politician.

He was elected as one of the two Members of Parliament (MPs) for County Cork in the 1865 general election, but did not complete a full parliamentary term before his death.

Parliament of the United Kingdom
| Preceded by Nicholas Leader; Vincent Scully | Member of Parliament for County Cork; 1865 – 1867; With: Nicholas Leader | Succeeded by Arthur-Smith Barry; Nicholas Leader |
