= Garrett Standish Barry =

Irish politician (1788–1864)

Garrett Standish Barry JP DL (1788 – 26 December 1864) was an Irish Liberal Member of Parliament for County Cork in the Parliament of the United Kingdom from 1832 to 1841. An extremely popular figure, Standish Barry retired to give his seat to "The Emancipator" Daniel O'Connell, who had failed to retain his seat in Dublin.

The eldest son of Standish Barry and Margaret Roche, he was from a prominent landed family seated at Leamlara House, Carrigtwohill. He was the first Catholic MP elected to represent Cork since the Roman Catholic Act of Emancipation in 1829. He was educated at Trinity College, Dublin and called to the Irish bar in 1811. After Standish Barry died, The Cork Examiner wrote of him, "In public life he was respected a stanch and uncompromising Liberal. In private he was esteemed for his highly honourable character and the amiability and kindness of his disposition."

Parliament of the United Kingdom
Preceded by Viscount Boyle; Edmund Burke Roche	Member of Parliament for County Cork; 1835–1841; With: Feargus O'Connor; Richard Longfield	Succeeded by Daniel O'Connell; Edmond Roche, 1st Baron Fermoy
