= Feargus O'Connor =

Irish politician (1796–1855)

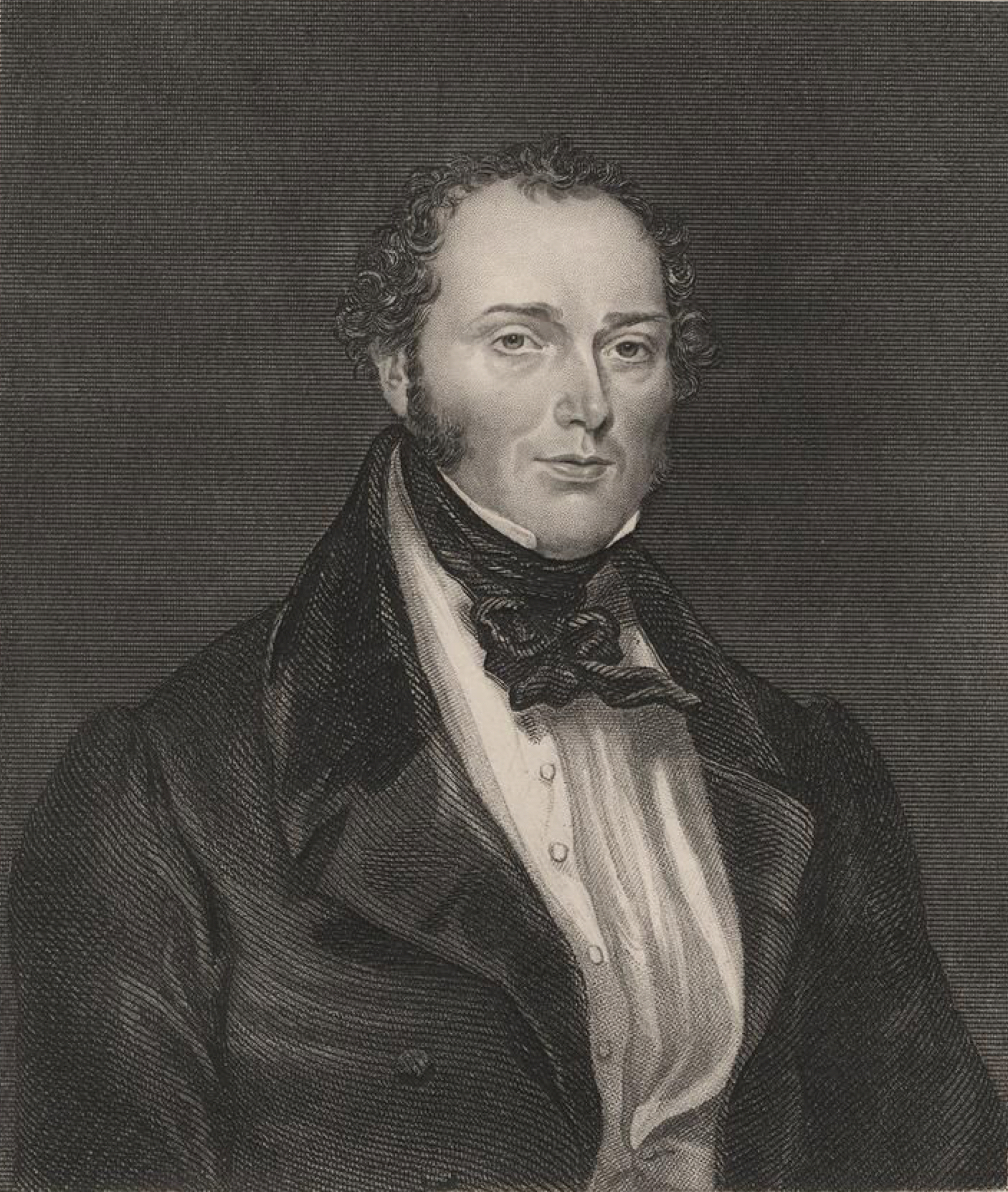

Member of Parliament for Nottingham
- In office 1847–1852

Member of Parliament for County Cork
- In office 1832–1835

Personal details
- Born: 18 July 1796 near Castletown-Kinneigh, Ireland
- Died: 30 August 1855 (aged 59) 18 Albert Terrace, Notting Hill Gate, London, England
- Party: Repeal

Feargus Edward O'Connor (18 July 1796 – 30 August 1855) was an Irish Chartist leader, MP and advocate of the Land Plan, which sought to provide smallholdings for the labouring classes. A highly charismatic figure, O'Connor was admired for his energy and oratory, but was criticised for alleged egotism. His newspaper Northern Star (1837–1852) was widely read among workers (and read aloud in taverns), becoming the voice of the Chartist movement.

After the failure of his Land Plan, O'Connor's behaviour became increasingly erratic, culminating in an assault on three MPs and a mental breakdown, from which he did not recover. After his death three years later at the age of 59, 40,000 people witnessed the funeral procession.

== Early life ==
Feargus O'Connor was born on 18 July 1796 in Connorville house, near Castletown-Kinneigh in west County Cork, into a prominent Irish Protestant family. He was originally christened Edward Bowen O'Connor, but his father chose to call him Feargus. His father was Irish nationalist politician Roger O'Connor, who like his uncle Arthur O'Connor was active in the United Irishmen. His elder brother Francis became a general in Simón Bolívar's army of liberation in South America. Much of his early life was spent on his family's estates in Ireland, which included Dangan Castle, the childhood home of the Duke of Wellington. He was educated mainly at Portarlington Grammar School and had some elementary schooling in England.

O'Connor's father Roger was notorious for his eccentric lifestyle. At one point Feargus and Francis decided to leave, stealing horses from their brother Roderic, travelling to London and asking to be taken in by family friend M.P. Francis Burdett. Burdett looked after them, and financed Feargus to run a farm in Ireland, but it was unsuccessful. He studied law at Trinity College, Dublin, before inheriting his uncle's estate in 1820. He took no degree, but was called to the Irish bar about 1820. Since he had to take an oath of allegiance to the crown to become a member of the Bar, his father disinherited him because he regarded it as inconsistent with the dignity of a descendant of the Kings of Ireland.

== Political career ==
O'Connor's first known public speech was made in 1822 at Enniskeen, County Cork, denouncing landlords and the Protestant clergy. During that year he composed a pamphlet State of Ireland. Around this time he was wounded in a fight with soldiers, perhaps as a member of the Whiteboys covert agrarian organisation. Going to London to escape arrest, he tried to make a living by writing. He produced five manuscripts at this time, but none were ever published.

In 1831 O'Connor agitated for the Reform Bill in County Cork, and, after its passage in 1832, he travelled about the county organising registration of the new electorate. During the 1830s he emerged as an advocate for Irish rights and democratic political reform, and a critic of the British Whig government's policies on Ireland. In 1832, he was elected to the British House of Commons as Member of Parliament for County Cork, as a Repeal candidate rather than a Whig.

Feargus O'Connor came into Parliament as a follower of Daniel O'Connell, and his speeches during this time were devoted mainly to the Irish question. He was sarcastically described by Fraser's Magazine as active, bustling, violent, a ready speaker, and the model of an Irish patriot, but as one who did nothing, suggested nothing, and found fault with everything. He voted with the radicals: for tax on property; for Thomas Attwood's motion for an inquiry into the conditions that prevailed in England; and in support of Lord Ashley's 1847 Factory Bill. He quarrelled with O'Connell, repudiating him for his practice of yielding to the Whigs, and came out in favour of a more aggressive Repeal policy.

In the general election of 1835 O'Connor was re-elected, but disqualified from being seated because he lacked sufficient property to qualify. However, it appears that he did have property valued at £300 a year. O'Connor next planned to raise a volunteer brigade for Isabella II of Spain in the First Carlist War, but when William Cobbett died in April 1835, he decided to run for Cobbett's seat at Oldham. Oldham was a two-member constituency and Cobbett's colleague John Fielden strongly advocated that Cobbett's son John Morgan Cobbett should be the Radical candidate to replace his father. O'Connor presented himself as an alternative Radical candidate, but eventually withdrew, alleging Fielden had not been straightforward with him: whether because of the controversy over the selection of the candidate or the refusal of J M Cobbett to support disestablishment, Cobbett lost narrowly to a local 'Liberal Conservative'.

In the 1837 general election he was nominated at Preston, but with no intention of taking votes from John Crawfurd, the only other anti-Tory candidate. Having been nominated and made his hustings speech, he withdrew once he and Crawfurd had won the show of hands traditionally called for before any polling took place

=== Radicalism and Chartism ===
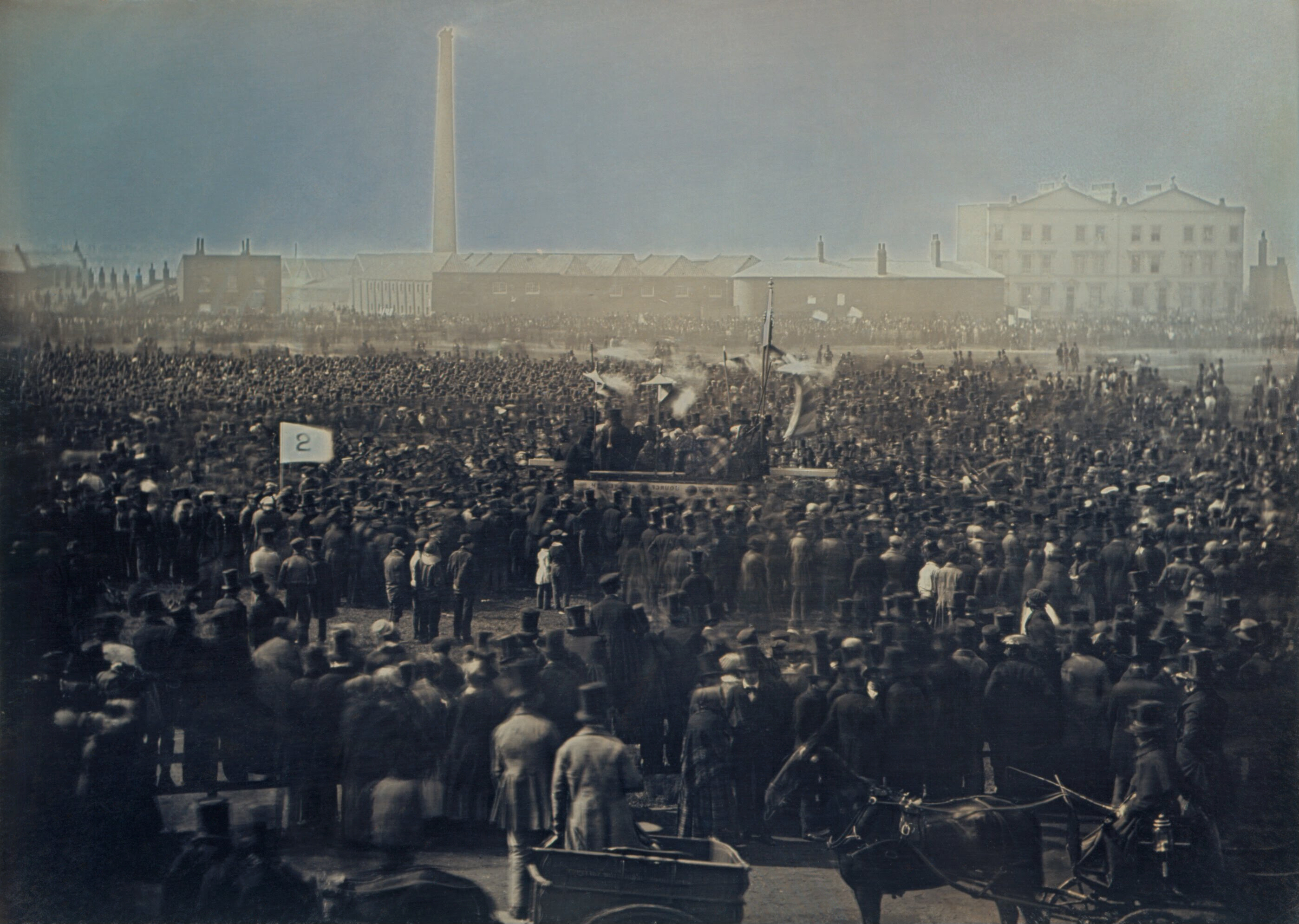
Photograph of the Great Chartist Meeting on Kennington Common, organised by O'Connor

From 1833 O'Connor had spoken to working men's organisations and agitated in factory areas for the "Five Cardinal Points of Radicalism," which were five of the six points later embodied in the People's Charter. In 1837 he founded at Leeds, Yorkshire, a radical newspaper, the Northern Star, and worked with others for a radical Chartism through the London Democratic Association. O'Connor was the Leeds representative of the London Working Men's Association (LWMA). He travelled Britain speaking at meetings, and was one of the most popular Chartist orators; some Chartists named their children after him. He was at various points arrested, tried and imprisoned for his views, receiving an 18-month sentence in 1840. He also became involved in internal struggles within the movement.

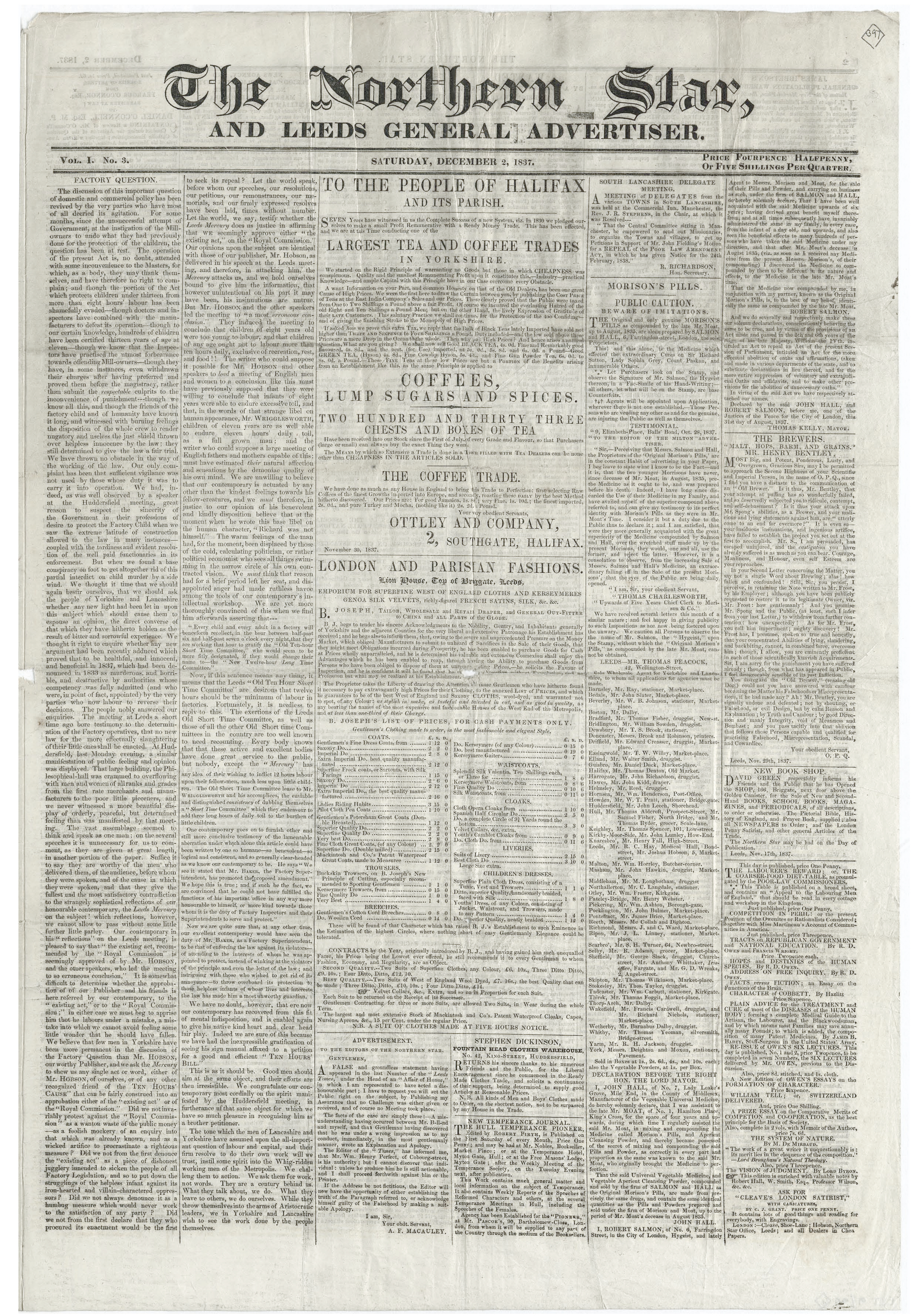

When the first wave of Chartism ebbed, O'Connor founded the Chartist Cooperative Land Company in 1845. It aimed to buy agricultural estates and subdivide the land into smallholdings which could be let to individuals. The impossibility of all subscribers acquiring one of the plots meant it was considered a lottery, and the company was declared illegal in 1851.

When Chartism again gained momentum O'Connor was elected in 1847 MP for Nottingham, and he organised the Chartist meeting on Kennington Common, London, in 1848. This meeting on 10 April proved a turning point: it was supposed to be followed by a procession. When the procession was ruled illegal, O'Connor asked the crowd to disperse, a decision contested by other radicals such as William Cuffay.

== Chartist Movement ==
As early as 1833, while MP for Cork, O'Connor had delivered an address to the National Union of the Working Classes, a political society of London working men, expressing radical sentiments. However O'Connor truly came into his own not when addressing audiences of London artisans or in the House of Commons, but when he went north as a public speaker.

He began to spend a large part of his time travelling through the north of England, addressing huge meetings, in which he denounced the 1834 Poor Law Amendment Act and advocated manhood suffrage. Only by securing the vote, O'Connor argued, could working people be rid of the hated New Poor Law.

O'Connor was a public speaker. He expressed defiance, determination and hope, and flavoured these speeches with comic similes and anecdotes. He looked the part of a popular leader, too. His physique was to his advantage: over six feet, muscular and massive, the "model of a Phoenician Hercules".

The voice of the organization was O'Connor's newspaper, the Northern Star, which first appeared on 18 November 1837 in Leeds. It met with immediate success and was soon the most widely bought provincial newspaper in Britain. Its editor was William Hill, a former Swedenborgian minister; Joshua Hobson was its publisher; and Bronterre O'Brien, former editor of the Poor Man's Guardian, became the principal leader-writer. Perhaps the most popular part of the paper was Feargus' weekly front page letter, often read aloud at meetings; but the inclusion of reports of Chartist meetings from around the country and of readers' poetry were also vital sections of a paper made it a very important instrument in unifying and promoting the Chartist cause.

When the London Working Men's Association published the People's Charter in 1838, O'Connor and the Star endorsed it but not the London leadership. O'Connor was not ready to accept the political leadership of the London Working Men's Association. He knew that the workers wanted something more immediate than political education. He became the "constant travelling, dominant leader of the movement" He, not William Lovett, became the voice of Chartism.

=== Physical Force vs. Moral Force ===
From the beginning O'Connor was attacked by Lovett and other leaders of the London Working Men's Association. They did not like his assertive leadership or the confrontational style of politics he represented. O'Connor, who had seen at first hand the embittered relations between workers and capitalists in the north of England, did not like the strategy of reasonable argument advocated by men like Lovett. He considered the situation was too urgent for that. O'Connor was not an insurrectionist but, like O’Connell in Ireland, he was not adverse to intimidating the authorities by a show of numbers. This was his thinking behind the organisation of monster meetings and mass petitions. On the question of moral force vs physical force, he chose his words carefully:

I have always been a man of peace. I have always denounced the man who strove to tamper with an oppressed people by any appeal to physical force. I have always said that moral force was the degree of deliberation in each man's mind which told him when submission was a duty or resistance not a crime; and that a true application of moral force would effect every change, but in case it should fail, physical force would come to its aid like an electric shock — and no man could prevent it; but that he who advised or attempted to marshal it would be the first to desert it at the moment of danger. God forbid that I should wish to see my country plunged into horrors of physical revolution. I wish her to win her liberties by peaceful means.

When the Chartist petition with 1,283,000 signatures was rejected by Parliament in summer 1839, tension grew, culminating in the Newport Rising. O'Connor was not involved in the planning of this event, though he must have known that there was a mood for rebellion among Chartists. He was a dangerous man to the authorities, and a sentence of 18 months in York Castle was passed on him in May 1840. In his farewell message, he made clear what he had done for the movement:

Before we part, let us commune fairly together. See how I met you, what I found you, how I part from you, and what I leave you. I found you a weak and unconnected party, having to grace the triumphs of the Whigs.

I found you weak as the mountain heather bending before the gentle breeze. I am leaving you strong as the oak that stands the raging storms. I found you knowing your country but on the map. I leave you with its position engraven upon your hearts.

I found you split up into local sections. I have levelled all those pigmy fences and thrown you into an imperial union…

O'Connor was jailed; while in prison he continued to write for the Northern Star. He was now the unquestioned leader of Chartism. It was at this time that the song Lion of Freedom was published in his honour. It was widely sung at Chartist meetings. Lovett, meanwhile, left the movement, full of anger at O'Connor but O'Connor's energy and commitment was to keep Chartism alive for the rest of the 1840s.

In 1842 a convention of the newly formed National Charter Association was held in order to draw up a new petition that was finally signed by 3,315,752 persons. The petition was denied a hearing, which added to the frustrations felt by working people at a time of great economic hardship. Across Britain in summer 1842 a wave of strikes broke out, calling both for an end to wage cuts and the implementation of the People's Charter.

=== Anti-Corn Law League ===
From its inception the Anti-Corn Law League vied with the Chartists for the support of working people. Bread was dear, and the League claimed that repealing the taxes on import of grain would allow the price to drop. Chartists argued that without the Charter, a repeal of the Corn Law would be of little use. Other factors in their favour were the distrust by working people of anything supported by the employers, and the fear that free trade would cause wages to drop still lower. This last point was stressed by O'Connor. He made biting attacks on the Anti-Corn Law League. In some towns – for example, Birmingham – O'Connorite Chartists broke up League meetings. O'Connor himself was certainly not afraid of taking on the leaders of the League head-on in debate – in 1844 he took on Richard Cobden in Northampton.

=== National Land Company and the Petition of 1848 ===
Faced with the declining strength of Chartism after the defeats of 1842, O'Connor turned to the idea of settling working people on the land. While in prison, he had advocated just such a scheme in the Northern Star under the heading "Letters to the Irish Landlords". In 1835, he had given notice of his intention to introduce a bill to modify the rights of Irish tenants moved in Parliament. He later said his bill would have sought

to compel landlords to make leases of their land in perpetuity — that is, to give to the tenant a lease for ever, at a corn rent; to take away the power of distraining for rent; and in all cases where land was held upon lease and was too dear, that the tenant in such cases should have the power of empaneling a jury to assess the real value in the same manner as the crown has the power of making an individual sell property required for what is called public works or conveniences according to the evaluation of a jury.

O'Connor considered that the "law of primogeniture is the eldest son of class legislation upon corruption by idleness". At the same time, he was opposed to the state ownership of land:

I have ever been, and I think I ever shall be opposed to the principles of communism, as advocated by several theorists. I am, nevertheless, a strong advocate of cooperation, which means legitimate exchange, and which circumstances would compel individuals to adopt, to the extent that communism would be beneficial.

As well as re-invigorating the Chartist Movement, O'Connor's plans were a powerful answer to emigration schemes for working people. He declared that Great Britain could support its own population if its lands were properly cultivated. In his book A Practical Work on the Management of Small Farms he set forth his plan of resettling surplus factory workers on smallholdings of two, three and four acres. He had no doubts of the yields obtainable under such spade-husbandry.

He proposed a stock company in which working men could buy land on the open market. The land was to be reconditioned, broken up into small plots, equipped with appropriate farm buildings and a cottage, and the new proprietor was to be given a small sum of money with which to buy stock. Consideration was not given to the difficulties for town people, many who had never lived in the country, of becoming farmers. O'Connor's plan was built on the assumption that land could be bought in unlimited quantities and at reasonable rates, and that all subscribers would be successful farmers who would repay promptly.

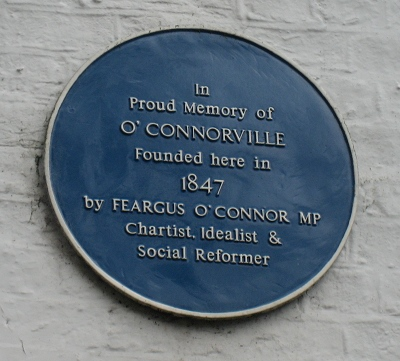
Feargus O'Connor commemorated at Heronsgate

O'Connor's Land Plan had its opponents in the movement, among them Thomas Cooper. On 24 October 1846 the Chartist Cooperative Land Company, later known as the National Land Company, came into being. A total of £112,100 was received in subscriptions, and with this six small estates were purchased and divided into smaller parcels. In May 1847 the first of the estates was opened at Heronsgate, renamed O'Connorsville. O'Connor's colleague Ernest Charles Jones wrote of this development:

See there the cottage, labour's own abode,
The pleasant doorway on the cheerful road,
The airy floor, the roof from storms secure,
The merry fireside and the shelter sure,
And, dearest charm of all, the grateful soil,
That bears its produce for the hands that toil.

The subscribers who got the land were chosen by ballot; they were to pay back with interest and ultimately all subscribers would be settled. O'Connor and Jones started The Labourer magazine to promote the project. Soon hundreds of working people were settled, and an outcry of opposition went up from the enemies of Chartism in the newspapers and in Parliament. Among the working people the Land Plan was very popular, O'Connor's assertion that the land was theirs meaning a great deal to them.

In 1847 O'Connor ran for parliament and, remarkably, defeated Thomas Benjamin Hobhouse in Nottingham but the Land Plan ran into trouble. When he had taken his seat he proposed in The Labourer that the government take over the National Land Company to resettle working people on a large scale. Those Chartist leaders with whom he had quarrelled accused him of being "no longer a 'five-point' Chartist but a 'five acre' Chartist." O'Connor replied to his critics at a meeting in Manchester but the political elite was moving to crush O'Connor's Land Plan, declaring it illegal.

In April 1848, a new Chartist petition was presented to Parliament with six million signatures. O'Connor accepted a declaration by the police that the Chartists could not march en masse with their petition from a mass meeting on Kennington Common. He made this decision to avoid bloodshed – he feared soldiers shooting down Chartists, as they had at Newport. An investigating committee in Parliament concluded that the petition contained not quite 2 million genuine signatures – it is unlikely, however, that the clerks could have counted this many signatures in the 17 hours they spent examining the petition.

On 6 June 1848, the House of Commons investigation found that the National Land Company was an illegal scheme that would not fulfil the expectations held out to the shareholders and that the books had been imperfectly kept.

A man under huge pressure, O'Connor began to drink heavily. In July 1849, the House of Commons finally voted on the People's Charter, and rejected it by 222 votes to 17. In 1850 O'Connor once more made a motion in favour of the Charter, but would not be heard.

== Last years ==
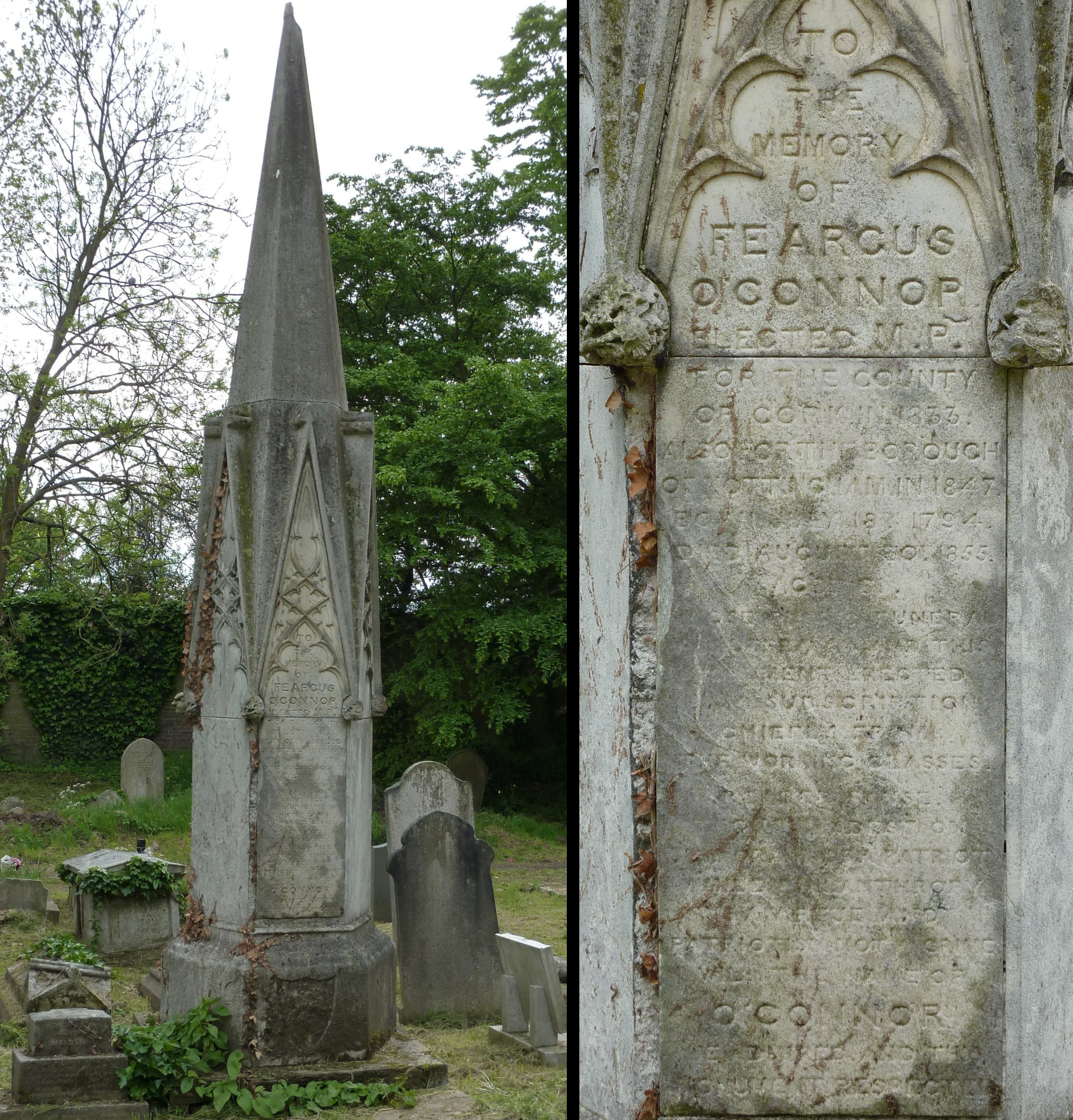
O'Connor's grave at Kensal Green Cemetery, London, photographed in 2014

O'Connor quarrelled with his closest colleagues, including Ernest Jones, Julian Harney and Thomas Clark. The circulation of the Northern Star fell steadily and it lost money. O'Connor's health was failing, and reports of his mental breakdown regularly appeared in the newspapers. In the spring of 1852 O'Connor visited the United States, where his behaviour left no doubt that he was not a well man. It is possible (though we have only the evidence of the unreliable diagnostic methods of the time) that O'Connor was in the early stages of general paralysis of the insane, brought on by syphilis.

In June 1852 in the House of Commons O'Connor struck three fellow MPs in the lobby of the House of Commons, among them Lord John Manners, the First Commissioner of Works. The following week he assaulted Sir Benjamin Hall, a reformist MP and vocal critic of the Land Plan. Arrested by the Deputy Sergeant-at-Arms, O'Connor was sent by his sister to Dr Thomas Harrington Tuke's private Manor House Asylum in Chiswick, where he remained until 1854, when he was removed to his sister's house. He died on 30 August 1855 at 18 Albert Terrace, Notting Hill Gate. and on 10 September was buried in Kensal Green cemetery. No fewer than 40,000 people witnessed the funeral procession. Most Chartists preferred to remember O'Connor's strengths rather than his shortcomings.

== Family ==
O'Connor never married, but had a number of relationships and it is believed that he fathered several children.

== Reputation ==
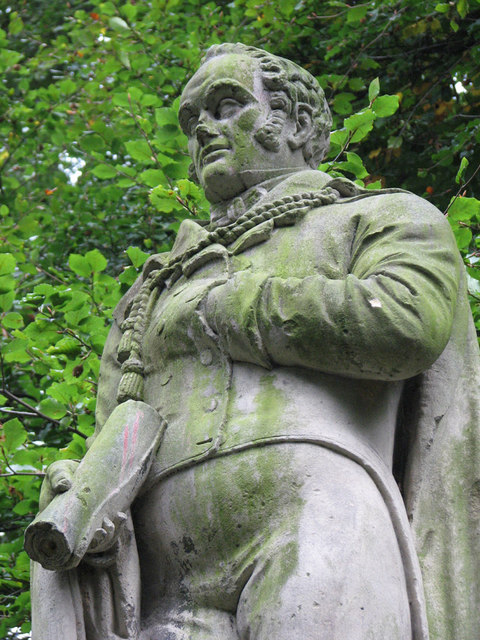
Statue of Feargus O'Connor in the Nottingham Arboretum

According to Dorothy Thompson, O'Connor was the "most well-loved man" of the movement:

For the chartists ... O'Connor was the acknowledged leader of the movement. Abler men among the leadership there certainly were and men with a clearer sense of direction in which a working-class movement should go, but none of them had the appeal which O'Connor had nor his ability to win the confidence and support of the great crowds who made up the Chartist meetings in their heyday. Over 6 ft tall—he was almost the tallest man in the House of Commons—and with a voice which could easily carry an open-air meetings of tens of thousands, with a handsome appearance, a quick wit and a rich vein of scurrility when it came to abusing his opponents, Connor possessed all the qualities of the first rate popular orator.

Many of the early historians of Chartism attributed the failure of Chartism at least in part to O'Connor. He was accused of egotism and of being quarrelsome. In recent years, however, there has been a trend to reassess him in a more favourable light.

The Lion of Freedom is come from his den;
We'll rally around him, again and again;
We'll crown him with laurel, our champion to be:
O'Connor the patriot, for sweet Liberty!

—from Lion of Freedom, a popular song about Feargus O'Connor

According to the historian G. D. H. Cole, O'Connor was inconsistent but a sincere friend of the poor. Important as that sympathy for working people was, there is more to be said in O'Connor's favour. His resilience and optimism in his speeches, and in his letters in the Northern Star spurred on rank-and-file Chartists, who came to share his determination to keep up the struggle for their political rights. If O'Connor was egotistical, perhaps that is what a leader of the people, condemned and castigated by the aristocracy and the middle class and by their newspapers, needed to be.

The attacks on O'Connor by some on his own side are well-known. Lovett called him "the great 'I am' of politics"; Francis Place said of him that he would use every means he could to lead and misled the working people. George Holyoake characterised as "the most impetuous and most patient of all tribunes who ever led the English Chartists".

== Bibliography ==
- Chase, Malcolm. Chartism: A New History (Manchester University Press, 2007), A standard scholarly history of the entire movement excerpt
- Cole, G.D.H., Chartist Portraits (1965 edn.).
- Cooper, Thomas, Life of Thomas Cooper (1872).
- Epstein, James. "Feargus O’Connor and the Northern Star", International Review of Social History 21 (1976) online
- Epstein, James, The Lion of Freedom: Feargus O'Connor and the Chartist Movement 1838–1842 (1982)
- Gammage, R.G., History of the Chartist Movement (1894).
- Holyoake, G.J. Sixty Years of an Agitators Life (1900).
- Kemnitz, Thomas Milton. "Approaches to the Chartist Movement: Feargus O'Connor and Chartist Strategy." Albion 5.1 (1973): 67–73.
- Lovett, William, Life and Struggles of William Lovett (1876).
- Pickering, Paul, Feargus O'Connor: A Political Life (2007).
- Read, Donald; Glasgow, Eric (1961), Feargus O'Connor: Irishman and Chartist, Arnold, London, OCLC 1336335894
- Roberts, Stephen, 'Feargus O'Connor in the House of Commons, 1847-52' in Ashton, O., Fyson, R., and Roberts, S., The Chartist Legacy (1999).
- Thompson, Dorothy, The Chartists (1984). (Reprinted, Breviary Stuff Publications, 2013).
- Thompson, Dorothy. The Dignity of Chartism (Verso Books, 2015). ch 9.

=== Primary sources ===
- The trial of Feargus O'Connor, Esq., barrister-at-law, and fifty-eight others at Lancaster : on a charge of sedition, conspiracy, tumult, and riot (1843) online

Parliament of the United Kingdom
Preceded by Richard Boyle, Viscount Boyle	Member of Parliament for County Cork; 1832–1835; With: Garrett Standish Barry 1832–1835	Succeeded by Garrett Standish Barry; Richard Longfield
Preceded by John Hobhouse; Thomas Gisborne	Member of Parliament for Nottingham; 1847–1852; With: John Walter (third)	Succeeded by Edward Strutt; John Walter (third)
