= Royal Cork City Militia =

Auxiliary unit of the British Army

Royal Cork City Militia Royal Cork City Artillery Cork RGA (M)
- Active: March 1793–31 July 1922
- Country: Ireland (1793–1800); United Kingdom (1801–1922)
- Branch: Irish Militia
- Role: Infantry/Garrison Artillery
- Size: 8–10 companies/4–6 batteries
- Part of: South Irish Division, Royal Artillery
- Garrison/HQ: Cork
- Engagements: Irish Rebellion of 1798: Battle of Prosperous; Battle of Rathangan; Skirmish at Sallins; Action at Ponsonby Bridge; Battle of Vinegar Hill

The Royal Cork City Militia, later the Royal Cork City Artillery, was an Irish Militia regiment raised in Cork City in 1793. It saw action during the Irish Rebellion of 1798. In 1854 it was converted to artillery militia and was embodied for home defence during the Crimean and Boer wars. As a Special Reserve unit of the Royal Garrison Artillery it served in coast defence and supplied trained gunners to the fighting units during World War I. It was disbanded at the time of Irish Independence.

== Precursors ==
Although there are scattered references to town guards – in 1584 those of Cork City comprised 300 'shot' (musketeers) and 100 billmen – no organised militia existed in Ireland before 1660. After the Stuart Restoration more formal militia forces were organised. In 1667 the militia of the City of Cork consisted of 600 foot and 60 horse; in 1681 they were 500 foot and 'two gallant troops of horse'. During the Williamite War in Ireland the Governor of Cork, Sir Richard Cox, increased the militia of the county to three regiments of foot (6000 men) and 26 independent troops of horse in 1691, which played an active part in the fighting. In 1715 the Irish Militia came under statutory authority, but its numbers fell away until the War of American Independence, when with a serious threat of invasion by the Americans' allies, France and Spain, Ireland had no national militia. It was not until the outbreak of the French Revolutionary War In 1793 that the Irish administration passed an effective Militia Act that created an official Irish Militia. The new Act was based on existing English precedents, with the men being conscripted by ballot to fill county quotas (paid substitutes were permitted) and the officers having to meet certain property qualifications.

== Royal Cork City Militia ==
=== French Revolutionary War ===
In March 1793 County Cork was given a quota of 1464 men to find, to be organised into three regiments each of 488 men in 8 companies:

- Royal Cork City Militia
- North Cork Militia at Fermoy
- South Cork Militia at Rathcormac

The new militia was widely unpopular, and Cork was one of the slower counties to fill its quota. The commandant of the City Militia, Richard Longfield, complained that it was hampered by the activities of insurers in the city who (for a price) provided volunteer substitutes for balloted men who were unwilling to serve. The order to embody the three regiments for service was not issued until 30 September and it was not carried out until 15 October. In 1795 the Irish militia was augmented, and each of the County Cork regiments was raised to an establishment of 612 men.

The French Revolutionary and Napoleonic Wars saw the British and Irish militia embodied for a whole generation, becoming regiments of full-time professional soldiers (though restricted to service in Britain or Ireland respectively), which the regular army increasingly saw as a prime source of recruits. They served in coast defences, manned garrisons, guarded prisoners of war, and carried out internal security duties. In August 1794 the Cork City regiment was stationed at Charleville, with two companies detached to Millstreet.

Anxiety about a possible French invasion grew during the autumn of 1796 and preparations were made for field operations. A large French expeditionary force appeared in Bantry Bay on 21 December and troops from all over Ireland were marched towards the threatened area. Soon afterwards news arrived that the French fleet had been scattered by the winter storms. Several ships had been wrecked and none of the French troops succeeded in landing; there was no sign of a rising by the United Irishmen. The invasion was called off on 29 December, and the troop concentration was dispersed in early 1797.

Early in 1797 the light companies of the militia were detached to join composite battalions drawn from several militia and regular regiments. The light companies of the three Cork regiments joined 1st Light Battalion. The militia regiments were each issued with two light six-pounder 'battalion guns', with the gun detachments trained by the Royal Artillery. When the militiamen of 1793 reached the end of their four-year enlistment in 1797, most of the Irish regiments were able to maintain their numbers through re-enlistments (for a bounty).

=== Irish Rebellion ===
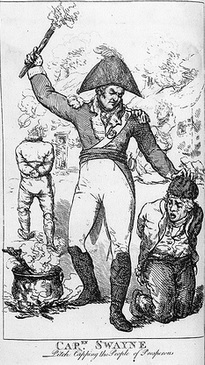
Captain Swayne pitchcapping the people of Prosperous, from the Irish Magazine, February 1810.

The expected Irish Rebellion finally broke out in May 1798. In Dublin the authorities quickly occupied strategic points in the city which the United Irishmen had planned to seize. The main body of the Royal Cork City Militia under Lieutenant-Colonel Longfield, with its battalion guns, was stationed in St Stephen's Green. Dublin City remained quiet. (Note: Maxwell places the North Cork Militia in St Stephen's Green on 23–4 May. However, in other passages he places them in Co Wexford. Other sources state that it was the Royal Cork Militia that was on duty in Stephen's Green on the outbreak of the rebellion.)

However, about 17 miles (27 km) away Captain Richard Swayne with a 40-strong detachment of the Light Company of the regiment and 20 of the Ancient British Fencible Cavalry were garrisoning the town of Prosperous, County Kildare, where they had made themselves unpopular by heavy-handed searches for illegal arms. On the night of 24 May John Esmonde led a small rebel force into the town, killed the two sentries, opened the gates and attacked the barracks. Most of the off-duty militiamen were trapped in the upper floors of the barracks which was set on fire by the rebels, those who jumped down being summarily killed. Swayne was killed in bed. The garrison's estimated casualties in this Battle of Prosperous range widely, but the Light Company appears to have lost two sergeants, a corporal and 23 privates killed in addition to Capt Swayne. Some of the Ancient Britons who had been billeted in private houses got away. The rest of the Royal Cork City's Light Company under Lieutenant Corker was on detachment at the time. Only two or three of the United Irishmen were killed. Swayne was later criticised even by loyalists for his heavy-handedness and for failing to double his sentries and take other defensive precautions on news of the rebellion.

Other small garrisons near Prosperous had managed to hold on.Rathangan, County Kildare, was attacked, on the same day as Prosperous but the yeomanry in garrison held on and were besieged for four days before being relieved by the main body of the Royal Cork City regiment under Lt-Col Longfield in the Battle of Rathangan. Lieutenant Pearce with a detachment was also successful in a separate skirmish. The 1st Light Battalion fought at the decisive Battle of Vinegar Hill on 21 June, which broke the back of the rebellion. On the same day another part of the Royal Cork City was engaged in an action at Ponsonby Bridge, outside Dublin. The rebellion was effectively ended at Vinegar Hill, and although a small French invasion force landed in August and inflicted a defeat on the government troops at the Battle of Castlebar it was too late to have any real effect, and soon surrendered.

After the rebellion the Irish Militia settled down to garrison duty once more. With the diminishing threat of invasion after 1799, the strength of the militia could be reduced, and the surplus men were encouraged to volunteer for regiments of the line. The light battalions were reformed in 1800, with the Cork companies once more in 1st Light Bn.

By the end of 1801 peace negotiations with the French were progressing, so recruiting and re-enlistment for the Irish Militia was stopped in October. The men received the new clothing they were due on 25 December, but the Treaty of Amiens was signed in March 1802 after which the militia regiments were disembodied leaving only the permanent staff of non-commissioned officers (NCOs) and drummers under the regimental adjutant.

=== Napoleonic Wars ===
However, the Peace of Amiens was short-lived and preparations to re-embody the militia begun in November 1802. Early in 1803 the regiments were ordered to begin re-enrolling former militiamen and new volunteers as well as using the ballot. The proclamation to embody the militia was issued on 15 March and carried out on 25 March.

Anti-invasion preparations were now put in hand and the reconstituted militia regiments underwent training, although most were not considered well enough trained to go into camp during the summer of 1804. The light battalions were reformed in September 1803 but were discontinued in 1806. Over the following years the regiments carried out garrison duties at various towns across Ireland, and attended summer training camps. As the war progressed, the Regular Army increasingly relied on volunteers from the militia for trained recruits. In 1805 the militia establishment was raised to allow for this.

Mountifort Longfield, Member of Parliament (MP) for Cork City, was appointed colonel of the Royal Cork Militia on 11 July 1805.

The war ended with the abdication of Napoleon in April 1814. Militia recruiting was halted and the Royal Cork City regiment was disembodied.

=== Long Peace ===
After the Battle of Waterloo there was a long peace. Although officers continued to be commissioned into the militia and ballots might still be held, the regiments were rarely assembled for training and the permanent staffs of militia regiments were progressively reduced.

Sir Augustus Warren, 3rd Baronet, was appointed Lt-Col on 13 April 1829. William, 2nd Marquess of Thomond was colonel of the regiment in 1840. After his death he was succeeded by Francis, Viscount Bernard (later 3rd Earl of Bandon), who was appointed on 5 September 1846.

== Militia Artillery ==
The Militia of the United Kingdom was revived by the Militia Act 1852, enacted during a period of international tension. As before, units were raised and administered on a county basis, and filled by voluntary enlistment (although conscription by means of the Militia Ballot might be used if the counties failed to meet their quotas). Training was for 56 days on enlistment, then for 21–28 days per year, during which the men received full army pay. Under the Act, Militia units could be embodied by Royal Proclamation for full-time home defence service in three circumstances:

1. 'Whenever a state of war exists between Her Majesty and any foreign power'.
2. 'In all cases of invasion or upon imminent danger thereof'.
3. 'In all cases of rebellion or insurrection'.

Colonel the Earl of Bandon and Capt Augustus Warren, the adjutant, revived the Royal Cork City Militia.

=== Royal Cork City Artillery ===
The 1852 Act introduced Artillery Militia units in addition to the traditional infantry regiments. Their role was to man coastal defences and fortifications, relieving the Royal Artillery (RA) for active service.

In December 1854 the revived Royal Cork City Militia was converted into the Cork City Artillery at Ballincollig Barracks on the outskirts of Cork. On 4 August 1855 the regiment formed up on the barrack square when it was announced that Queen Victoria had approved the change of name to Royal Cork City Artillery. The headquarters was established at Elizabeth Fort in Cork and the unit consisted of four batteries.

The outbreak of the Crimean War in 1854 and the despatch of an expeditionary force led to the militia being called out for home defence. The Royal Cork City Artillery was embodied for service from February 1855, doing duty at Ballincollig. It also provided large number of recruits to the Regulars. The war ended with the Treaty of Paris on 30 March 1856, and the militia began to be stood down: the Royal Cork were disembodied in September 1856. At the time of the Indian Mutiny of 1857–58 the Royal Cork again provided large number of volunteers for the Regulars.

The militia now settled into a routine of annual training (though there was no training for the Irish Militia from 1866 to 1870 at the time of the Fenian crisis). The militia regiments now had a large cadre of permanent staff (about 30) and a number of the officers were former Regulars. Around a third of the recruits and many young officers went on to join the Regular Army. The Militia Reserve introduced in 1867 consisted of present and former militiamen who undertook to serve overseas in case of war. Some of these were called out in 1878 during the Balkan Crisis.

The appointment of colonel in the militia lapsed after the 1852 reforms; after the Earl of Bandon retired he was appointed Honorary Colonel. Lieutenant-Col Arthur Bell-Martin, late of the 7th Dragoon Guards, was appointed Lt-Col Commandant on 10 March 1875. After the earl's death his son James, 4th Earl of Bandon succeeded him as Hon Col on 31 July 1878.

Following the Cardwell Reforms a mobilisation scheme began to appear in the Army List from December 1875. This assigned places in an order of battle of the 'Garrison Army' to Militia Artillery units: the Royal Cork City Artillery's war station was in the Portland Harbour defences in England.

=== West Cork Artillery Militia ===
The 3rd Cork Artillery was formed as a new unit at Kinsale in November 1854. Colonel the Earl of Bandon and Adjutant Warren may have been loaned from the Royal Cork City Artillery to help raise the new unit. Richard, 4th Earl of Shannon, the Hon William Hedges-White (later 3rd Earl of Bantry) and William Longfield (former captain, 12th Foot) were appointed Hon Col, Lt-Col Commandant and Major respectively, with seniority from 30 November 1854. The unit was redesignated the West Cork Artillery Militia in March 1855. It had six batteries and was headquartered at Macroom.

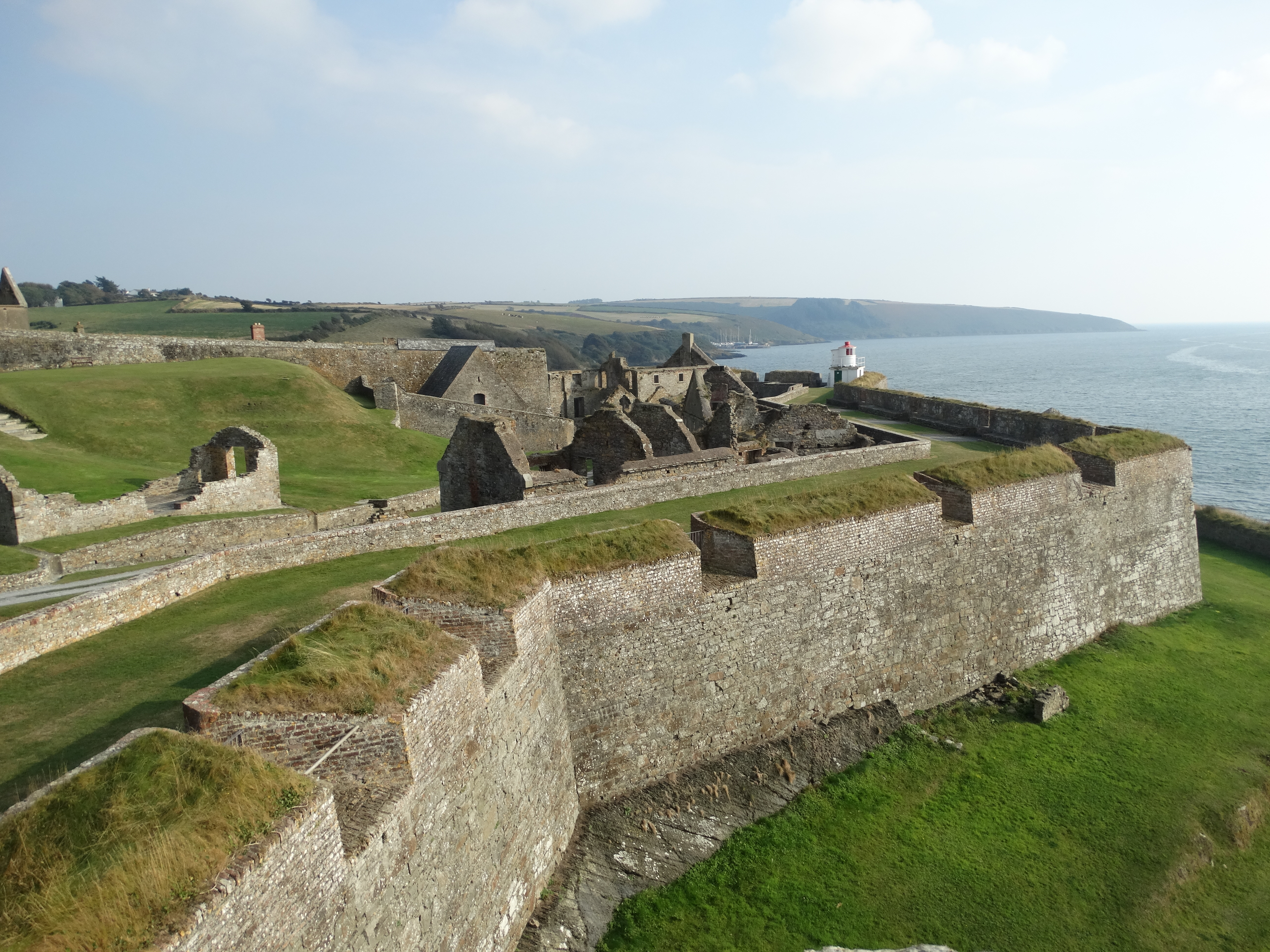
Charles Fort, Kinsale Harbour.

The new unit was embodied at Macroom for home defence during the Crimean War from February 1855. By the beginning of April 1855 it was garrisoning Charles Fort in Kinsale Harbour, where it remained for the rest of the war. It was disembodied in September 1856.

Under Cardwell's mobilisation scheme, the West Cork Artillery's war stations would have been with a number of other Irish militia artillery units distributed in various of small forts and batteries, including Charles Fort and Kinsale.

=== South Irish Division ===
Cap Badge of the Royal Regiment of Artillery.

The Artillery Militia was reorganised into 11 divisions of garrison artillery on 1 April 1882, and the West Cork and Royal Cork City units became the 2nd Brigade and 3rd Brigade respectively of the South Irish Division, Royal Artillery, at Kinsale and Cork. When the South Irish Division was abolished on 1 July 1889 and absorbed into the Southern Division, the titles were altered to West Cork Artillery (Southern Division) RA and Cork City Artillery (Southern Division) RA respectively. The West Cork were at Fort Westmorland on Spike Island in Cork Harbour.

On 1 September 1890 the Cork City Artillery absorbed the larger West Cork Artillery to form the Cork Artillery. Lieutenant-Col Lunham of the West Cork took command of the combined unit, whose HQ was at Fort Elizabeth, Cork.

In 1899 the Royal Artillery was divided into two distinct branches, field and garrison. The garrison branch was named the Royal Garrison Artillery (RGA) and included coast, position, heavy, siege and mountain artillery, the militia units manning fixed coast defences. The unit was redesignated the Cork Royal Garrison Artillery (Militia).

On the outbreak of the Second Boer War the Militia Reserve was called out and soon the militia artillery was embodied for home defence while the bulk of the Regular Army was serving in South Africa. The Cork RGA (M) served from 9 May to 6 November 1900.

== Special Reserve ==
After the Boer War, the future of the Militia was called into question, especially the coast defence units, which were perceived to have been inadequately trained when called out. There were moves to reform all the Auxiliary Forces (Militia, Yeomanry and Volunteers) to take their place in the six Army corps proposed by St John Brodrick as Secretary of State for War. For this, some batteries of Militia Artillery were to be converted to field artillery. However, little of Brodrick's scheme was carried out.

Under the more sweeping Haldane Reforms of 1908, the Militia was replaced by the Special Reserve (SR), a semi-professional force whose role was to provide reinforcement drafts for Regular units serving overseas in wartime. Most RGA (M) units were transferred to the Royal Field Artillery Reserve in 1908, but were disbanded in 1909, their personnel becoming a pool of reservists to be called out in wartime. In Great Britain the coast defence artillery was to be supplemented by Territorial Force (TF) units, but the TF did not exist in Ireland, so the Cork and Antrim RGA (M) units were retained for this role. The Cork was designated the Cork Royal Garrison Reserve Artillery in 1908, and later the Cork RGA (SR).

=== World War I ===
On the outbreak of World War I in August 1914 the South Irish Coast Defences covered the defended ports of Queenstown and Berehaven, manned by Nos 10, 43 and 49 Companies of the Regular RGA, supplemented by the Cork RGA (SR). They operated the following armament:

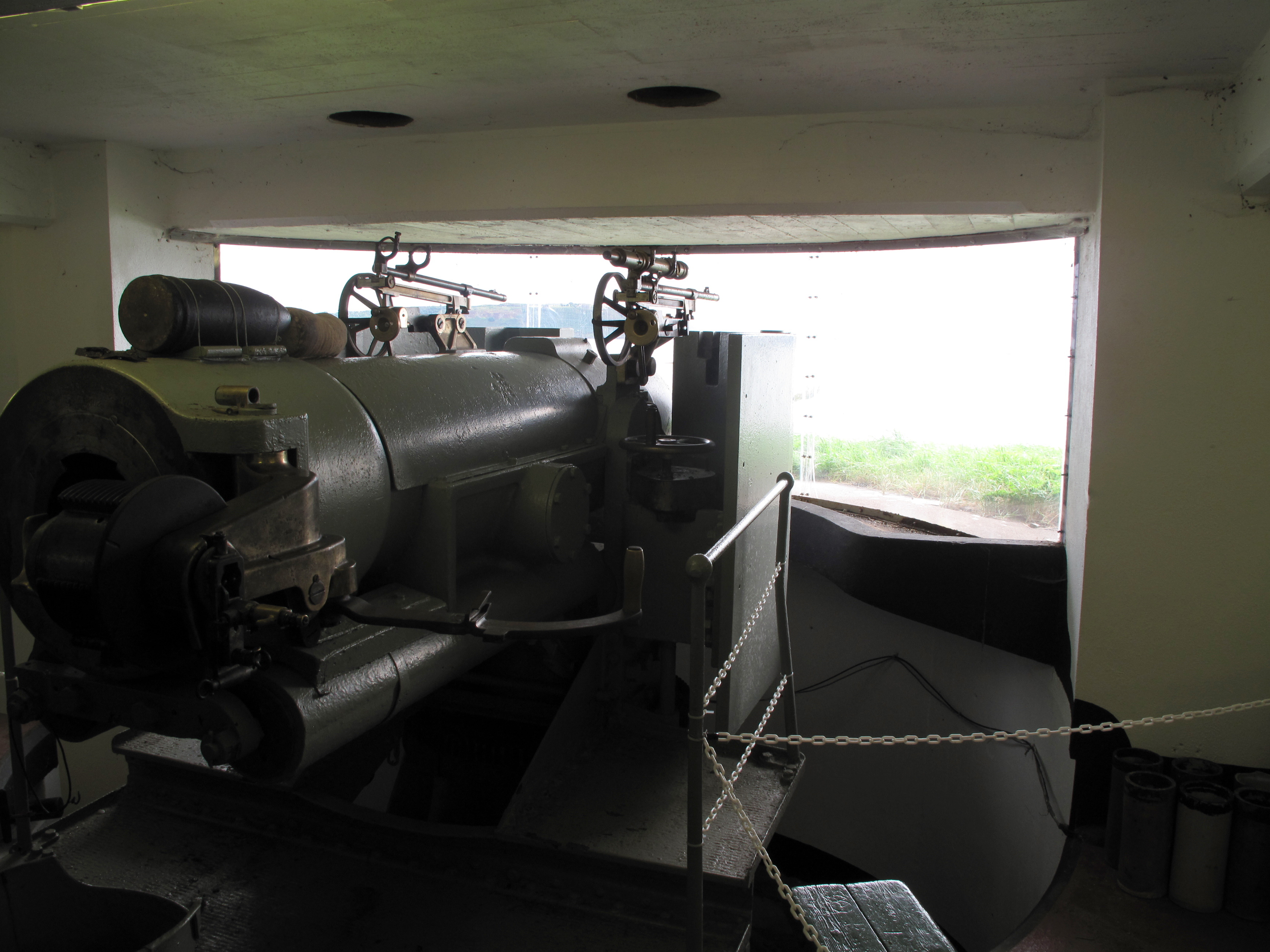
Breech of a 6-inch gun at Spike Island, defending Queenstown.

- Queenstown:
  - 4 x 9.2-inch guns
  - 6 x 6-inch guns
  - 8 x 12-pounder guns
- Berehaven:
  - 2 x 9.2-inch guns
  - 6 x 6-inch guns
  - 2 x 4.7-inch guns
  - 8 x 12-pounder guns

During the war the RGA (SR) units supplied officers and men to the new RGA units being formed for overseas service. For example, Capt G.W. Graham, the Cork RGA's Instructor in Artillery, was appointed officer commanding the new 301st Siege Battery, RGA in 1917.

In October 1918 the coastal artillery of the United Kingdom was reorganised into Fire Commands, which took over existing district establishments and the Regular, SR and TF companies. The Cork RGA with the three regular companies was absorbed into Nos 31 & 32 (Cork) Fire Commands at Berehaven and Queenstown respectively.

Although the Special Reserve reverted to its old title of Militia in 1921, the Cork regiment was not reactivated after the war. It was formally disbanded on 31 July 1922 following Irish Independence. Queenstown and Berehaven remained in British hands as treaty ports after 1922, but they were manned by Regular Army gunners.

== Heritage & ceremonial ==
=== Uniforms & insignia ===
When the Irish militia was established in 1793 it was uniformed in the same red coats as the Line infantry. As a 'Royal' regiment the Cork City Militia wore blue facings on its red coats. On conversion to artillery it adopted the blue uniforms and red facings of the RA, and the RA's 'gun' cap badge. From about 1907 the men wore the brass title 'RGA' over 'CORK' on the shoulder straps of their khaki service dress.

=== Precedence ===
The Royal Cork City Militia ranked 27th in the list of Irish Militia regiments in 1794 and 1798.

The lists of militia precedence established during the Napoleonic Wars continued until 1833, when King William IV drew lots for a new list for the whole of the United Kingdom. The first 69 places went to regiments raised before the peace of 1783. The next 60 consisted of those raised during the French Revolutionary War, including all the Irish regiments. The Royal Cork received the 110th place, which it retained when the list was revised for the last time in 1855. A list was drawn up in 1855 for precedence among the new militia artillery units: the West Cork was awarded 4th place, the Cork City was 5th.

=== Commanders ===
==== Royal Cork City Militia ====
Commanding officers of the regiment and its successors included the following:

Colonels

- Mountifort Longfield, MP, appointed 11 July 1805.
- William, 2nd Marquess of Thomond before 1840; died 21 August 1846
- Francis, Viscount Bernard (later 3rd Earl of Bandon), appointed 5 September 1846

'Honorary Colonels

- Francis, 3rd Earl of Bandon, retired colonel, appointed 12 November 1873, died 17 February 1877
- James, 4th Earl of Bandon, appointed 31 July 1878, continued with Cork RGA (M) and Cork RGA (SR)

Lieutenant-colonels (Commanding officers after March 1875)

- Richard Longfield in 1793
- Sir Augustus Warren, 3rd Baronet, appointed 13 April 1829
- Andrew Jordaine Wood, former captain 15th Hussars, 4 January 1855
- Lieutenant-Col Arthur Bell-Martin, formerly 7th Dragoon Guards, appointed Lt-Col Commandant 10 March 1875
- R.M. Studdert, appointed 8 October 1887
- T.A. Lunham, from West Cork Artillery 1 September 1890
- John Seymour Lemon, promoted 1 September 1903
- S.F. Kirkwood, formerly Waterford RGA (M), appointed 1 September 1912

==== West Cork Artillery ====
Honorary Colonels

- Richard, 4th Earl of Shannon, appointed 30 November 1854, died 1 August 1868
- Henry Boyle, 5th Earl of Shannon, appointed 22 February 1871, died 8 February 1890

Lt-Cols Commandant

- Hon William Hedges-White (later 3rd Earl of Bantry), 30 November 1854
- William Longfield, former captain 12th Foot, promoted 19 November 1873
- Patrick Duncan, promoted 24 November 1877
- T.A. Lunham, promoted 19 August 1885
