= Rickard Deasy (campaigner) =

Irish activist

Personal details
- Born: 13 March 1916
- Died: 13 June 1999 (aged 83)
- Party: Labour Party

Military service
- Branch/service: Irish Defence Forces
- Years of service: 1939–1945
- Rank: Lieutenant
- Unit: 13th Field Battery

Rickard Joseph Gerard Deasy (13 March 1916 – 13 July 1999), born in Terryglass, County Tipperary was a prominent farmers' rights campaigner in Ireland, Captain with the Irish army, and a member of the Labour Party. He was President of the National Farmers Association of Ireland between 1961 and 1967, and was the leader of a mass protest by Irish farmers in 1966.

== Personal life ==
Rickard Deasy was the son of Major Henry Hugh Peter Deasy, founder of the Deasy Motor Car Company, and his wife Dolores Hickie, daughter of James and Lucilla Hickie and sister of Sir William Hickie; he was a grandson of the leading judge Rickard Deasy. He was educated at Christ Church, Oxford. In 1961, he succeeded Dr. John Nassau Greene as President of the National Farmers' Association of Ireland.

== Military career ==
Deasy joined the Irish Defence Forces on 5 September 1939 as a private. In 1940 he was commissioned lieutenant in the sixth field battery at Kildare Barracks, and would become commander of his unit. Later he became the instructor at the depot and school of artillery at Kildare. Before the end of World War II, Deasy was the officer commanding of the thirteenth field battery.

== Farmers' Rights Campaign ==
In 1966, frustrated with the desperate economic situation of Irish farmers and the hostile Minister for Agriculture, Charlie Haughey, Deasy organised what was to be a 30,000-man walking protest from Cork to the Irish Parliament at Dáil Éireann in Dublin. This was followed by a 20-day sit-in protest and a six-month campaign of civil disobedience by farmers, culminating in the Irish Farmers' Association being officially recognized by the Irish Government.

Recognition of the Farmers' Association was seen as a major step forward for social partnership in Ireland, and a consultative approach to economic participation. It attracted widespread media attention, coming at a time of general distrust towards groups advocating greater economic equality. Deasy was at times accused of being a Marxist, which may have thwarted his electoral chances in a mainly rural constituency. His role in the farmers' movement was considered to have damaged the political aspirations of Charlie Haughey.

In 1969, Deasy ran as a labour candidate in Tipperary North, but came in last place with a small percentage of the vote.

Deasy married Countess Sheila O'Kelly de Gallagh. They had four children, three boys and one girl.
