= County Cork (UK Parliament constituency) =

UK parliamentary constituency in Ireland, 1801–1885

- Former county constituency for the House of Commons
- County: County Cork

1801–1885
- Seats: 2
- Created from: County Cork
- Replaced by: East Cork, Mid Cork, North Cork, North East Cork, South Cork, South East Cork and West Cork

County Cork was a parliamentary constituency in Ireland, represented in the Parliament of the United Kingdom from 1801 to 1885. It returned two Members of Parliament (MPs) to the House of Commons of the United Kingdom of Great Britain and Ireland.

== Boundaries ==
This constituency comprised County Cork, except for the city of Cork and the boroughs of Bandon, Kinsale, Mallow and Youghal, which were separately represented. The boroughs of Baltimore, Castlemartyr, Charleville, Clonakilty, Doneraile, Midleton and Rathcormack were disfranchised by the Acts of Union 1800.

Under the Redistribution of Seats Act 1885, the borough constituencies in the county other than Cork City were abolished and the county constituency was replaced by the constituencies of East Cork, Mid Cork, North Cork, North East Cork, South Cork, South East Cork and West Cork, each electing one MP. These constituencies were first used at the 1885 general election.

== Members of Parliament ==
| Year | First member | First party | Second member | Second party |
|---|---|---|---|---|
| 1801, 1 January | Viscount Boyle | | Robert Uniacke Fitzgerald | |
| 1806, 17 November | Viscount Boyle | Whig | Hon. George Ponsonby | Whig |
| 1807, 16 May | Viscount Bernard | Tory | Hon. George Ponsonby | Whig |
| 1812, 23 October | Viscount Bernard | Tory | Viscount Ennismore | Tory |
| 1818, 29 June | Viscount Kingsborough | Whig | Viscount Ennismore | Tory |
| 1826, 21 June | Robert King | Whig | Viscount Ennismore | Tory |
| 1827, 4 December | Robert King | Whig | John Boyle | Whig |
| 1830, 12 August | Robert King | Whig | Viscount Boyle | Whig |
| 1832, 29 December | Feargus O'Connor | Repeal Association | Garrett Standish Barry | Repeal Association |
| 1835, 5 June | Richard Longfield | Conservative | Garrett Standish Barry | Repeal Association |
| 1837, 18 August | Edmond Roche | Repeal Association | Garrett Standish Barry | Repeal Association |
| 1841, 15 July | Edmond Roche | Repeal Association | Daniel O'Connell | Repeal Association |
| 1847, 2 July | Edmond Roche | Repeal Association | Maurice Power | Repeal Association |
| 1852, 22 March | Edmond Roche | Whig | Vincent Scully | Ind. Irish |
| 1855, 23 April | Rickard Deasy | Whig | Vincent Scully | Ind. Irish |
| 1857, 10 April | Rickard Deasy | Whig | Alexander McCarthy | Ind. Irish |
| 1859, 10 May | Rickard Deasy | Liberal | Vincent Scully | Liberal |
| 1861, 28 February | Nicholas Leader | Conservative | Vincent Scully | Liberal |
| 1865, 29 July | Nicholas Leader | Conservative | George Richard Barry | Liberal |
| 1867, 3 February | Nicholas Leader | Conservative | Arthur Smith-Barry | Liberal |
| 1868, 30 November | McCarthy Downing | Liberal | Arthur Smith-Barry | Liberal |
| 1874, 9 February | McCarthy Downing | Home Rule | William Shaw | Home Rule |
| 1879, 20 February | David la Touche Colthurst | Home Rule | William Shaw | Home Rule |
| 1885 | Constituency divided: see East Cork, Mid Cork, North Cork, North East Cork, South Cork, South East Cork and West Cork | | | |

== Elections ==
- 1801 (co-option), (1) Henry Boyle, Viscount Boyle, later Earl of Shannon (to 1807), b. 8 August 1771, d. 22 April 1842 aged 70; (2) Robert Uniacke Fitzgerald, b. 17 March 1751, d. 20 December 1814 aged 63
- 1806 17 November, George Ponsonby (to 1812), b. 1773, d. 5 June 1863 aged 90
- 1807 16 May, James Bernard, Viscount Bernard, later Earl of Bandon (to 1818), b. 14 June 1785, d. 31 October 1856 aged 71
- 1812 23 October, Richard Hare, Viscount Ennismore (to 1827), b. 20 March 1773, d. 24 September 1827 aged 54
- 1818 29 June, Edward King, Viscount Kingsborough,(Whig), b. 16 November 1795, d. 27 February 1837 aged 41
- 1826, 21 June, Robert Henry King, after Earl of Kingston (to 1832), (Whig), b. 4 October 1796, d. 21 January 1867 aged 70
- 1827, 4 December, John Boyle, b. 13 March 1803, d. 6 December 1874 aged 71

=== Elections in the 1830s ===
General election 1830: County Cork
| Party | Candidate | Votes | % |
|---|---|---|---|
| Whig | Robert King | Unopposed | |
| Whig | Richard Boyle | Unopposed | |
| Registered electors | | 3,138 | |
| Whig hold | | | |
| Whig gain from Tory | | | |

General election 1831: County Cork
| Party | Candidate | Votes | % |
|---|---|---|---|
| Whig | Robert King | Unopposed | |
| Whig | Richard Boyle | Unopposed | |
| Registered electors | | 3,178 | |
| Whig hold | | | |
| Whig hold | | | |

General election 1832: County Cork
| Party | Candidate | Votes | % |
|---|---|---|---|
| Repeal | Feargus O'Connor | 1,837 | 32.0 |
| Repeal | Garrett Standish Barry | 1,778 | 30.9 |
| Tory | Francis Bernard | 994 | 17.3 |
| Tory | Abraham Morris | 737 | 12.8 |
| Whig | Robert King | 401 | 7.0 |
| Tory | Richard Hedges Becher | 2 | 0.0 |
| Whig | Thomas Stephen Coppinger | 0 | 0.0 |
| Majority | | 784 | 13.6 |
| Turnout | | 3,022 | 78.8 |
| Registered electors | | 3,835 | |
| Repeal gain from Whig | | | |
| Repeal gain from Whig | | | |

General election 1835: County Cork
| Party | Candidate | Votes | % | ±% |
|---|---|---|---|---|
| Repeal (Whig) | Feargus O'Connor | 1,630 | 31.0 | −1.0 |
| Repeal (Whig) | Garrett Standish Barry | 1,613 | 30.7 | −0.2 |
| Conservative | Richard Longfield | 1,027 | 19.5 | +6.7 |
| Conservative | Francis Bernard | 984 | 18.7 | +1.4 |
| Majority | | 586 | 11.2 | −2.4 |
| Turnout | | c. 2,627 | c. 66.9 | c. −11.9 |
| Registered electors | | 3,926 | | |
| Repeal hold | | Swing | −2.5 | |
| Repeal hold | | Swing | −2.1 | |

- On petition, O'Connor was declared not qualified and unseated in favour of Longfield

General election 1837: County Cork
| Party | Candidate | Votes | % | ±% |
|---|---|---|---|---|
| Repeal (Whig) | Garrett Standish Barry | 1,902 | 31.3 | +0.6 |
| Repeal (Whig) | Edmond Roche | 1,902 | 31.3 | +0.3 |
| Conservative | Richard Longfield | 1,148 | 18.9 | −0.6 |
| Conservative | James King | 1,114 | 18.4 | −0.3 |
| Majority | | 754 | 12.4 | +1.2 |
| Turnout | | c. 3,035 | c. 62.2 | c. −4.7 |
| Registered electors | | 4,878 | | |
| Repeal hold | | Swing | +0.5 | |
| Repeal hold | | Swing | +0.4 | |

=== Elections in the 1840s ===
General election 1841: County Cork
| Party | Candidate | Votes | % | ±% |
|---|---|---|---|---|
| Repeal | Daniel O'Connell | 1,274 | 38.5 | +7.2 |
| Repeal | Edmond Roche | 1,274 | 38.5 | +7.2 |
| Conservative | Nicholas Leader | 406 | 12.3 | −7.1 |
| Conservative | Robert Longfield | 357 | 10.8 | −7.1 |
| Majority | | 868 | 26.2 | +13.8 |
| Turnout | | 1,680 | 45.3 | −16.9 |
| Registered electors | | 3,706 | | |
| Repeal hold | | Swing | +7.2 | |
| Repeal hold | | Swing | +7.2 | |

O'Connell's death caused a by-election.

By-election, 2 July 1847: County Cork
| Party | Candidate | Votes | % | ±% |
|---|---|---|---|---|
| Repeal | Maurice Power | 833 | 60.5 | −16.5 |
| Conservative | Nicholas Leader | 544 | 39.5 | +16.4 |
| Majority | | 289 | 21.0 | −5.2 |
| Turnout | | 1,377 | 30.8 | −14.5 |
| Registered electors | | 4,474 (1847 figure) | | |
| Repeal hold | | Swing | −16.5 | |

General election 1847: County Cork
| Party | Candidate | Votes | % | ±% |
|---|---|---|---|---|
| Repeal | Maurice Power | Unopposed | | |
| Repeal | Edmond Roche | Unopposed | | |
| Registered electors | | 4,474 | | |
| Repeal hold | | | | |
| Repeal hold | | | | |

=== Elections in the 1850s ===
Power was appointed Lieutenant-Governor of Saint Lucia, resigning and causing a by-election.

By-election, 22 March 1852: County Cork
| Party | Candidate | Votes | % | ±% |
|---|---|---|---|---|
| Independent Irish | Vincent Scully | 3,956 | 56.0 | New |
| Conservative | Moreton Frewen | 3,105 | 44.0 | New |
| Majority | | 851 | 12.0 | N/A |
| Turnout | | 7,061 | 53.5 | N/A |
| Registered electors | | 13,192 | | |
| Independent Irish gain from Repeal | | Swing | N/A | |

General election 1852: County Cork
| Party | Candidate | Votes | % | ±% |
|---|---|---|---|---|
| Independent Irish | Vincent Scully | Unopposed | | |
| Whig | Edmond Roche | Unopposed | | |
| Registered electors | | 13,192 | | |
| Independent Irish gain from Repeal | | | | |
| Whig gain from Repeal | | | | |

Roche was elevated to the peerage, becoming 1st Baron Fermoy and causing a by-election.

By-election, 23 April 1855: County Cork
| Party | Candidate | Votes | % | ±% |
|---|---|---|---|---|
| Whig | Rickard Deasy | 3,238 | 41.2 | N/A |
| Whig | William Hare | 3,000 | 38.1 | N/A |
| Independent Irish | Alexander McCarthy | 1,628 | 20.7 | N/A |
| Majority | | 238 | 3.1 | N/A |
| Turnout | | 7,866 (est) | 59.6 (est) | N/A |
| Registered electors | | 13,192 | | |
| Whig hold | | Swing | N/A | |

General election 1857: County Cork
| Party | Candidate | Votes | % | ±% |
|---|---|---|---|---|
| Whig | Rickard Deasy | 6,788 | 42.7 | N/A |
| Independent Irish | Alexander McCarthy | 6,265 | 39.4 | N/A |
| Independent Irish | Vincent Scully | 2,852 | 17.9 | N/A |
| Majority | | 523 | 3.3 | N/A |
| Turnout | | 7,953 (est) | 50.9 | N/A |
| Registered electors | | 15,633 | | |
| Whig hold | | Swing | N/A | |
| Independent Irish hold | | Swing | N/A | |

General election 1859: County Cork
| Party | Candidate | Votes | % | ±% |
|---|---|---|---|---|
| Liberal | Rickard Deasy | Unopposed | | |
| Liberal | Vincent Scully | Unopposed | | |
| Registered electors | | 15,716 | | |
| Liberal hold | | | | |
| Liberal hold | | | | |

Deasy was appointed Solicitor-General for Ireland, requiring a by-election.

By-election, 5 July 1859: County Cork
| Party | Candidate | Votes | % | ±% |
|---|---|---|---|---|
| Liberal | Rickard Deasy | Unopposed | | |
| Registered electors | | 15,716 | | |
| Liberal hold | | | | |

=== Elections in the 1860s ===
Deasy was appointed Attorney-General for Ireland, requiring a by-election.

By-election, 5 March 1860: County Cork
| Party | Candidate | Votes | % | ±% |
|---|---|---|---|---|
| Liberal | Rickard Deasy | 5,674 | 62.6 | N/A |
| Conservative | Charles Noel | 3,395 | 37.4 | New |
| Majority | | 2,279 | 25.2 | N/A |
| Turnout | | 9,069 | 57.7 | N/A |
| Registered electors | | 15,716 | | |
| Liberal hold | | | | |

Deasy resigned after being appointed a Baron of the Exchequer, causing a by-election.

By-election, 28 February 1861: County Cork
| Party | Candidate | Votes | % | ±% |
|---|---|---|---|---|
| Conservative | Nicholas Leader | 6,441 | 69.3 | N/A |
| Liberal | Edmund Roche | 2,852 | 30.7 | N/A |
| Majority | | 3,589 | 38.6 | N/A |
| Turnout | | 9,293 | 59.1 | N/A |
| Registered electors | | 15,716 | | |
| Conservative gain from Liberal | | | | |

General election 1865: County Cork
| Party | Candidate | Votes | % | ±% |
|---|---|---|---|---|
| Liberal | George Richard Barry | 7,593 | 45.1 | N/A |
| Conservative | Nicholas Leader | 6,958 | 41.3 | N/A |
| Liberal | Vincent Scully | 2,298 | 13.6 | N/A |
| Turnout | | 14,551 (est) | 93.4 (est) | N/A |
| Registered electors | | 15,572 | | |
| Majority | | 635 | 3.8 | N/A |
| Liberal hold | | | | |
| Majority | | 4,660 | 27.7 | N/A |
| Conservative gain from Liberal | | | | |

Barry's death caused a by-election.

By-election, 23 February 1867: County Cork
| Party | Candidate | Votes | % | ±% |
|---|---|---|---|---|
| Liberal | Arthur Smith-Barry | Unopposed | | |
| Liberal hold | | | | |

General election 1868: County Cork
| Party | Candidate | Votes | % | ±% |
|---|---|---|---|---|
| Liberal | McCarthy Downing | 8,011 | 43.7 | N/A |
| Liberal | Arthur Smith-Barry | 6,610 | 36.0 | −9.1 |
| Liberal | Robert Boyle | 3,717 | 20.3 | N/A |
| Majority | | 2,893 | 15.7 | +11.9 |
| Turnout | | 9,169 (est) | 56.9 (est) | −36.5 |
| Registered electors | | 16,105 | | |
| Liberal hold | | | | |
| Liberal gain from Conservative | | | | |

=== Elections in the 1870s ===
General election 1874: County Cork
| Party | Candidate | Votes | % | ±% |
|---|---|---|---|---|
| Home Rule | William Shaw | Unopposed | | |
| Home Rule | McCarthy Downing | Unopposed | | |
| Registered electors | | 15,633 | | |
| Home Rule gain from Liberal | | | | |
| Home Rule gain from Liberal | | | | |

Downing's death caused a by-election.

By-election, 17 Feb 1879: County Cork
| Party | Candidate | Votes | % | ±% |
|---|---|---|---|---|
| Home Rule | David la Touche Colthurst | 8,157 | 80.1 | N/A |
| Conservative | George Colthurst | 2,027 | 19.9 | New |
| Majority | | 6,130 | 60.2 | N/A |
| Turnout | | 10,184 | 66.3 | N/A |
| Registered electors | | 15,634 | | |
| Home Rule hold | | Swing | N/A | |

=== Elections in the 1880s ===
General election 1880: County Cork
| Party | Candidate | Votes | % | ±% |
|---|---|---|---|---|
| Home Rule | William Shaw | 5,354 | 43.3 | N/A |
| Home Rule | David la Touche Colthurst | 3,584 | 29.0 | N/A |
| Home Rule | Andrew Kettle | 3,430 | 27.7 | N/A |
| Majority | | 154 | 1.3 | N/A |
| Turnout | | 6,184 (est) | 40.4 (est) | N/A |
| Registered electors | | 15,321 | | |
| Home Rule hold | | Swing | N/A | |
| Home Rule hold | | Swing | N/A | |
