= McCarthy Downing =

McCarthy Downing MP

Member of Parliament for County Cork
- In office 17 November 1868 – 9 January 1879 Serving with Arthur Smith-Barry (until 1874); William Shaw (from 1874)
- Preceded by: Nicholas Leader
- Succeeded by: David la Touche Colthurst

Personal details
- Born: May 11, 1814 Kenmare, County Kerry, Ireland
- Died: 9 January 1879 (aged 64) Skibbereen, County Cork, Ireland
- Resting place: Caheragh, County Cork, Ireland
- Party: Home Rule League (from 1874)
- Other political affiliations: Liberal (until 1874)
- Spouse: Jane McCarthy (m. 1837)
- Children: Seven

Timothy McCarthy Downing (11 May 1814 – 9 January 1879) was an Irish Liberal Party and Home Rule League politician. He was Liberal Member of Parliament (MP) for County Cork from 1868 to 1874, and then a Home Rule League MP for the same constituency until his death in 1879. Downing was a solicitor, and his family house was Prospect House, Skibbereen, which later became the Bishop Residence. He is buried in Old Caheragh Graveyard, Skibbereen.

Parliament of the United Kingdom
Preceded by Nicholas Leader; Arthur Smith-Barry	Member of Parliament for County Cork; 1868 – 1879; With: Arthur Smith-Barry (until 1874); William Shaw (from 1874)	Succeeded by David la Touche Colthurst; William Shaw
