= Vincent Scully (MP) =

Irish politician

Vincent Scully QC MP

Member of Parliament for County Cork
- In office 10 May 1859 – 29 July 1865 Serving with Nicholas Leader (1861–1865); Rickard Deasy (1859–1861)
- Preceded by: Rickard Deasy; Alexander McCarthy
- Succeeded by: George Richard Barry; Nicholas Leader
- In office 22 March 1852 – 10 April 1857 Serving with Rickard Deasy (1855–1857); Edmond Roche (1852–1855)
- Preceded by: Edmond Roche; Maurice Power
- Succeeded by: Rickard Deasy; Alexander McCarthy

Personal details
- Born: 8 January 1810 Dublin, Ireland
- Died: 4 June 1871 (aged 61)
- Party: Liberal
- Other political affiliations: Whig (until 1859)

Vincent Scully, QC MP (8 January 1810 – 4 June 1871), was an Irish Liberal and Whig politician.

He was first elected as one of the two Members of Parliament (MPs) for County Cork at a by-election in 1852, and retained it in the general election later that year, but lost the seat at the following general election in 1857. He regained the seat in 1859 before losing it again in 1865. While an MP during the former years, Scully produced a number of pamphlets on the Irish land question, including Free Trade in Land (published 1853). He also introduced the 'Transfer of Land Bill (Ireland)' to the House of Commons in 1853, which was "praised for its ingenuity".

Scully was educated at Oscott College, where he was one of the editors of The Oscotian from 1826. He also attended Trinity College Dublin and Trinity College, Cambridge but did not graduate from either of the universities.

In 1833, he was called to the Irish Bar, and in 1840 he became a Queen's Counsel.

Parliament of the United Kingdom
| Preceded by Rickard Deasy; Alexander McCarthy | Member of Parliament for County Cork; 1859 – 1865; With: Nicholas Leader (1861–1865); Rickard Deasy (1859–1861) | Succeeded by George Richard Barry; Nicholas Leader |
| Preceded by Edmond Roche; Maurice Power | Member of Parliament for County Cork; 1852 – 1857; With: Rickard Deasy (1855–1857); Edmond Roche (1852–1855) | Succeeded by Rickard Deasy; Alexander McCarthy |
