= Rickard Deasy =

Irish lawyer and judge

Rickard Deasy PC (1812 – 6 May 1883) was an Irish lawyer and judge.

He was born at Phale Court, Enniskean, County Cork, the second son of Rickard Deasy, a wealthy brewer, and his wife Mary Anne Caller. He was educated at the Trinity College Dublin, where he graduated with a Doctorate of Law. He was called to the Irish Bar, and became Queen's Counsel. He practised mainly on the Munster Circuit, and quickly became one of its leaders.

He married Monica O'Connor, youngest daughter of Hugh O'Connor of Dublin, and had three children, of whom two died young. His only surviving son was Henry Hugh Peter Deasy (1866-1947), the soldier and writer, author of In Tibet and Chinese Turkestan, and founder of the Deasy Motor Car Company. Henry in turn was the father of the agricultural campaigner Rickard Deasy.

Deasy was elected as Member of Parliament for County Cork on 23 April 1855 in a by-election following Edmond Roche's elevation to the peerage. He was appointed Third Serjeant-at-law in 1858, then Solicitor-General for Ireland in 1859 and then Attorney-General for Ireland in 1860, being also appointed to the Irish Privy Council (on 21 February). On the death of Richard Wilson Greene in 1861 Deasy was raised to the bench as a Baron of the Exchequer. He was appointed to the Irish Court of Appeal in 1878, and served on that court until his death in 1883. He was buried in the family vault in Deans Grange Cemetery, beside his wife, who had died a few weeks earlier.

He was a fine lawyer, especially in the field of equity: as a barrister, he was noted for identifying himself fully with his clients' interests. He was also an effective Parliamentarian, concise and professional in his dispatch of Government business. His name is permanently associated with the Landlord and Tenant Law Amendment (Ireland) Act 1860, universally known as Deasy's Act, which as Attorney General he steered through Parliament.

== Arms ==
Coat of arms of Rickard Deasy

Notes
Granted 9 April 1860 by Sir John Berard Burke, Ulster King of Arms.
Crest
In front of two trefoils slipped in saltire and a dexter arm erect couped above the elbow.
Escutcheon
Argent in base a dexter hand Proper holding a dagger erect of the first pommel and hilt Or and in chief two castles Gules.
Motto
Toujours Pret

Parliament of the United Kingdom
Preceded by Edmond Roche; Vincent Scully	Member of Parliament for County Cork; 1855–1861; With: Vincent Scully 1855–1857; Alexander McCarthy 1857–1859; Vincent Scully 1859–1861	Succeeded by Vincent Scully; Nicholas Leader
Legal offices
Preceded by John George	Solicitor-General for Ireland; 1859–1860	Succeeded by Thomas O'Hagan
Preceded by John FitzGerald	Attorney-General for Ireland; 1860–1861	Succeeded by Thomas O'Hagan
