= Richard Boyle, 4th Earl of Shannon =

British politician

Richard Boyle, 4th Earl of Shannon (12 May 1809 – 1 August 1868), styled Viscount Boyle until 1842, was a British politician of the Whig party. He served as Member of Parliament for County Cork from 1830 to 1832.

== Background ==
Boyle was the son of Henry Boyle, 3rd Earl of Shannon and his wife, Sarah, daughter of John Hyde of Castle Hyde and his wife, Sarah Burton. Hyde was a descendant of the Hyde family of Denchworth in Berkshire (now Oxfordshire).

== Political career ==
Boyle was elected a Member of Parliament for County Cork in the 1830 United Kingdom general election and re-elected in the 1831 United Kingdom general election.

The Reform Act 1832 (including the Representation of the People (Ireland) Act 1832) increased the number of individuals entitled to vote, increasing the size of electorate by 50–80%, and allowing a total of 653,000 adult males (around one in five) to vote, in a population of some 14 million.

In the 1832 general election which followed, Boyle failed to be re-elected, defeated by Feargus O'Connor, a leader of the Chartist movement, and Garrett Standish Barry. Barry was a Catholic, one of the first one elected to Parliament following the Roman Catholic Relief Act 1829. On 22 April 1842, his father died and Boyle succeeded him. He held no other political office until his death. He had been an officer of the disembodied South Cork Light Infantry militia regiment from at least 1830 to 1850, and was appointed Honorary Colonel of the West Cork Artillery Militia when that regiment was first raised on 30 November 1854.

== Family ==
On 28 May 1832, Lord Shannon married Emily Henrietta Seymour in London. She was a daughter of Lord George Seymour-Conway and Isabella Hamilton. His father-in-law was a son of Francis Seymour-Conway, 1st Marquess of Hertford and his wife Lady Isabella Fitzroy. His mother-in-law was a daughter of the Reverend George Hamilton, Canon of Windsor (1718–1787) and his wife Elizabeth Onslow.

They had two sons:

- Henry Bentinck Boyle, 5th Earl of Shannon (22 November 1833 – 8 February 1890).
- Frederick James Boyle (16 September 1835 – 10 October 1861).

Parliament of the United Kingdom
Preceded by John Boyle; Robert King	Member of Parliament for County Cork; 1830–1832	Succeeded by Feargus O'Connor; Garrett Standish Barry
Peerage of Ireland
Preceded by Henry Boyle	Earl of Shannon; 1842–1868	Succeeded by Henry Bentinck Boyle
