= Henry Hugh Peter Deasy =

British Army officer and businessman

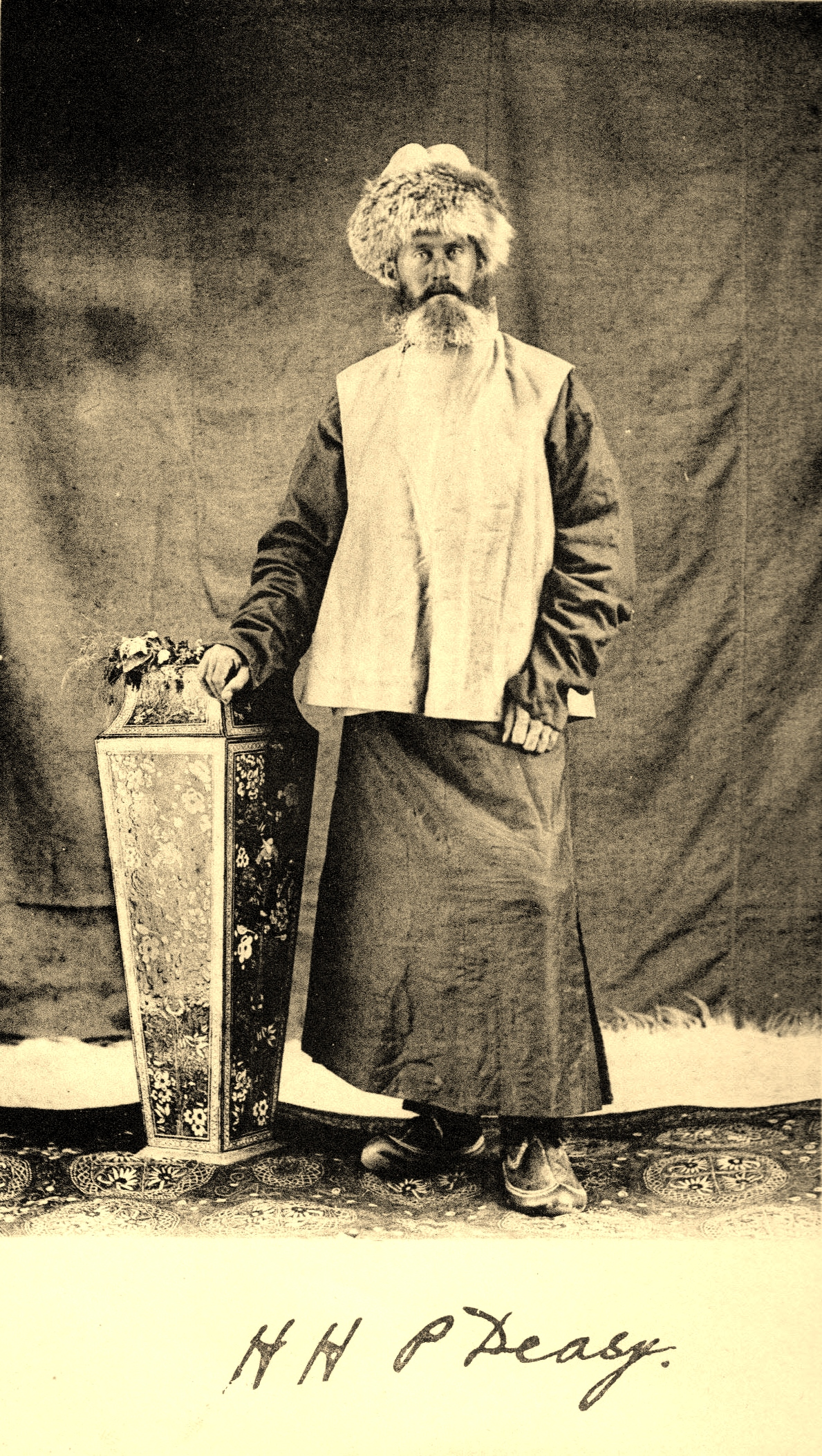
Captain Deasy

Henry Hugh Peter Deasy (29 Jun 1866 – 24 Jan 1947) was an Irish army officer, founder of the Deasy Motor Car Company and a writer.

== Career ==
He was born in Dublin, the only surviving son of Rickard Deasy, justice of the Court of Appeal in Ireland, and Monica O'Connor.

He served as a British Army officer, mostly in India, between 1888 and 1897, when he retired.

After his army service, he became one of the first westerners to write a detailed account of Tibet, covering his travels between 1897 and 1899. Consequently, he won the Royal Geographical Society's Founder's Medal in 1900 for surveying nearly 40,000 square miles (100,000 km^{2}) of the Himalayas. He also provided photographs for a book by Percy W. Church. In 1898 during his time in Chinese Turkestan, he collected the holotype of the jerboa species Dipus deasyi, which is named after him.

In 1903 he helped promote the Rochet-Schneider Company by driving a car from London to Moscow non-stop. He also drove a Martini up a mountain rock railway near Montreux, Switzerland. At this time H H P Deasy and Co. was formed to import both Rochet-Schneider and Martini cars into the UK. In 1906 The Deasy Motor Car Manufacturing Co. was formed, and took over the factory formerly used by the Iden Car Co. at Parkside, Coventry. On 9 March 1908 Deasy resigned, after a dispute with the car's designer Edmund W Lewis.

In 1913, as a member of the council of the Roads Improvement Association, he formulated a scheme for a standard type of direction post and plate for adoption by highway authorities.

He married Dolores Hickie, daughter of Colonel James Hickie and his wife Lucilla Larios y Tashara, and sister of Sir William Hickie. They had three children, including the agricultural campaigner Rickard Deasy.

== Works ==
- In Tibet and Chinese Turkestan; vol. 1

== Sources ==
- Henry Hugh Peter Deasy - In Tibet and Chinese Turkestan: Being the record of three years' exploration, London: T. Fisher Unwin, January 1, 1901
- Percy W. Church - Chinese Turkestan with Caravan and Rifle London: Rivingstons, 1901 (includes photographs by Deasy)
