= Richard Boyle, 6th Earl of Shannon =

Canadian politician

The Earl of Shannon

Member of the Legislative Assembly of the Northwest Territories
- In office 15 September 1885 – 10 August 1887
- Preceded by: New district
- Succeeded by: Frederick Haultain
- Constituency: Macleod

Personal details
- Born: 15 May 1860
- Died: 11 December 1906 (aged 46) Ciliau Aeron, Cardiganshire, Wales
- Party: Independent

Richard Henry Boyle, 6th Earl of Shannon (15 May 1860 – 11 December 1906) was a politician in Canada's Northwest Territories. He served as a member of the Legislative Assembly of the Northwest Territories from 1885 to 1887.

== Early life ==
Boyle was the son of Henry Boyle, 5th Earl of Shannon and Lady Blanche Emma Lascelles.

== Political career ==
Boyle ran for a seat to the Legislative Assembly of the Northwest Territories in the 1885 Northwest Territories election. He defeated candidate George C. Ives to become the first Member for the new electoral district of Macleod. Boyle did not serve a full term in office before resigning, vacating his seat in 1887. He died at Monachty Mansion in Cardiganshire, Wales on 11 December 1906.

Peerage of Ireland
Preceded by Henry Bentinck Boyle	Earl of Shannon; 1890–1906	Succeeded by Richard Bernard Boyle
