= Nicholas Leader (born 1773) =

Irish barrister, landowner, businessman and Liberal politician

Nicholas Philpot Leader (19 January 1773 – 7 February 1836) was an Irish barrister, landowner, businessman and Liberal politician. He sat in the House of Commons of the United Kingdom from 1830 to 1832.

Leader was the eldest son of William Leader, who owned extensive estates in County Cork, including the family's homes at Mount Leader near Millstreet and Dromagh Castle neat Kanturk. After education at Trinity College Dublin, the King's Inn and the Middle Temple, he was called to the Irish bar in 1798.

His father's estates included the coal mines of the north Cork coalfield, which Leader developed further with the help of a government loan. An ally of Daniel O'Connell, he unsuccessfully contested the County Cork constituency at the 1812 general election as a supporter of Catholic Emancipation. In 1828, the year he succeeded to his father's estates, he was nominated with O'Connell's support at the Tralee by-election, but was not elected.

At the 1830 general election, Leader's name was suggested for several seats, but he was eventually nominated for Kilkenny City as a Liberal supporter of reform.

He was re-elected at the 1831 general election, and supported the Reform Acts as they passed through the House of Commons, but vigorously opposed the Irish Reform Bill's failure to significantly expand the franchise. At the 1832 general election he chose not to sign the Repeal Association's pledge and stood down from Parliament.

Leader died at Nashville, County Cork in February 1836. His eldest son Nicholas succeeded to his estates, and in 1861 was elected as a Conservative MP for County Cork.

Parliament of the United Kingdom
Preceded by John Doherty	Member of Parliament for Kilkenny City; 1830–1832	Succeeded by Richard Sullivan
