= Thomas Brodrick (1654–1730) =

Irish and British politician and landowner

Thomas Brodrick (4 August 1654 – 3 October 1730) was an Irish and British politician who sat in the Irish House of Commons between 1692 and 1727 and also in the British House of Commons from 1713 to 1727. He owned lands in both Surrey in England, and County Cork, Ireland.

== Life ==
Brodrick was the eldest son of Sir St John Brodrick of Ballyannan, Midleton, County Cork and his wife Alice Clayton, daughter of Laurence Clayton of Mallow, County Cork and his wife Alice Brady daughter of Luke Brady, of Tuamgraney, co. Clare. He was admitted at Trinity Hall, Cambridge and also at Middle Temple in 1670. He received an LLB in 1677. He inherited lands at Wandsworth in 1680, and received a settlement of some of the family's Irish lands upon marrying.

Brodrick sat in the Irish House of Commons for Midleton from 1692 to 1693, for County Cork from 1695 to 1699 and again from 1703 to 1713, and for Midleton again from 1715 to 1727. He was appointed to the Irish Privy Council in 1695, removed by the Tory administration in 1711 but reappointed in 1714.

Brodrick lived more in England than Ireland in his adult years. He had contacts with Whig politicians in England and was appointed Comptroller of the Salt in 1706, and joint comptroller of army accounts from 1708 to 1711. He was elected as Member of Parliament for Stockbridge at the 1713 general election and again at the 1715 general election.

Brodrick was chosen to chair a Committee of Secrecy established during the aftermath of the South Sea Bubble, with the aim of investigating those responsible for the affair. During his time as chairman, his nephew, St. John Brodrick, described him as "the only man that either can or will set matters in a true light".

At the 1722 general election, he was elected as MP for Guildford. He did not stand in the 1727 general election. Dean Jonathan Swift referred to him in connection with his political activities at least twice in his writings.

== Personal life ==
Brodrick died on 3 October 1730 at the family estate at Wandsworth, and was buried there. He was brother of Alan Brodrick, 1st Viscount Midleton. He married Anne Piggott, daughter of Alexander Piggott of Innishannon and they had one son, Laurence, who was appointed Register of Deeds and Conveyances in Ireland in 1735.

Parliament of Ireland
Preceded by John Long	Member of Parliament for Midleton; 1692–1695; With: Henry Petty	Succeeded by Francis Brewster; St John Brodrick
Preceded by Sir St John Brodrick; Henry Boyle	Member of Parliament for County Cork; 1695–1713; With: Sir St John Brodrick 1695–1703; Sir John Perceval 1703–1713	Succeeded by Sir John Perceval; Alan Brodrick
Preceded by Arthur Hyde; Jephson Busteed	Member of Parliament for Midleton; 1715–1727; With: Edward Corker	Succeeded by Richard Bettesworth; Eaton Stannard
Parliament of Great Britain
Preceded by George Dashwood; The Earl of Barrymore	Member of Parliament for Stockbridge; 1713–1722; With: Richard Steele 1713; The Earl of Barrymore 1714; Martin Bladen 1715	Succeeded by John Chetwynd; Martin Bladen
Preceded by Arthur Onslow; Morgan Randyll	Member of Parliament for Guildford; 1722–1727; With: Arthur Onslow	Succeeded by Arthur Onslow; Colonel Richard Onslow
