= George Faulkner =

Irish publisher and bookseller

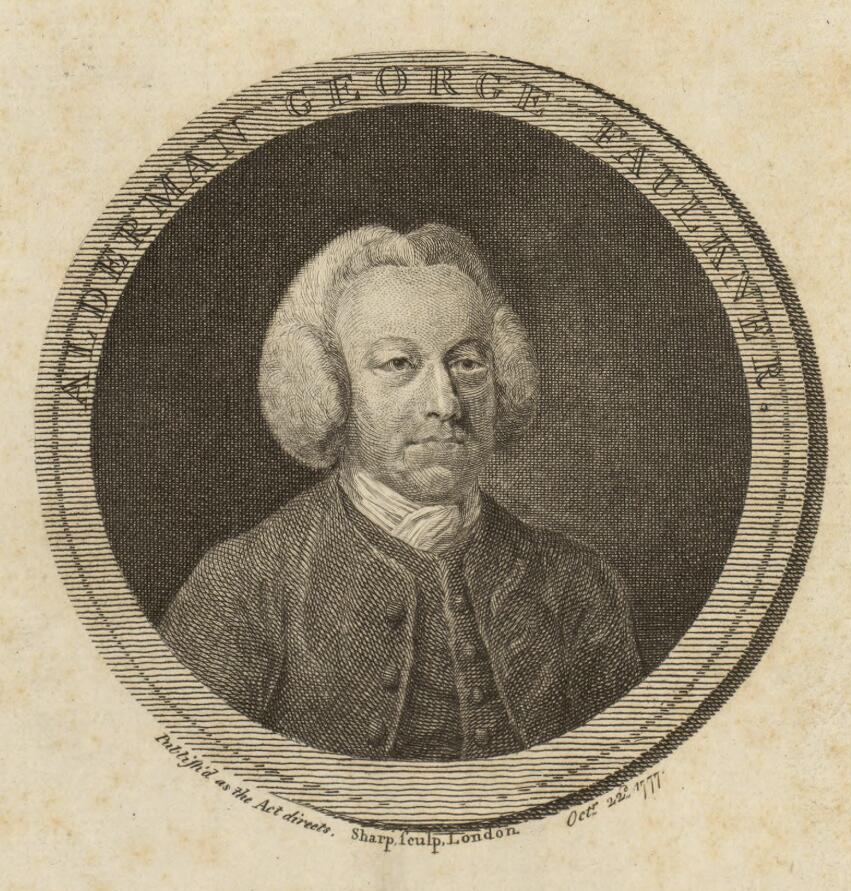
George Faulkner

George Faulkner (c. 1703 – 30 August 1775) was one of the most important Irish publishers and booksellers. He forged a publishing relationship with Jonathan Swift and parlayed that fame into an extensive trade. He was also deeply involved with the argument over copyright infringement and piracy, both creating and fighting "Irish editions".

Faulkner's year of birth, which is not certain, was probably 1703; his place of birth is unknown. He served his apprenticeship from 1717 to 1724 in Dublin, later setting up his own business. In the 1720s, while travelling frequently to London, he became a friend of the London printer, William Bowyer. In 1730, he suffered gangrene in one leg and had to have it amputated. It is known that he had a wife, the widow, Mary Taylor.

== Relationship with Swift ==
Swift's usual printer during the 1720s was Benjamin Motte in London, but Faulkner published Swift's Drapier's Letters in 1725. The details of how and why Faulkner got this assignment are obscure. Both men were in London in 1726, but, again, there is no direct evidence that the two were associated very clearly. However, by 1730, Swift and Faulkner were friends, and Faulkner's Dublin Journal began to both favour Swift's causes and take up Swift's style after this time. The publication of Drapier's Letters briefly landed him in trouble with the authorities: he was ordered into custody by the Irish House of Lords, but not convicted, and at the next session of Parliament, he was set free after being censured.

In 1732, Faulkner published Queries in Dublin Journal and was brought to the House of Lords to answer charges for doing so. The piece had been part of Swift's Considerations upon Two Bills Relating to the Clergy, and Swift admired Faulkner's courage. Swift must have discussed giving Faulkner an edition of his Works, as Faulkner himself attested, because in 1733 Faulkner advertised a subscription for the multi-volume work. Motte objected, and Swift claimed that the edition was without authority. However, when the edition appeared in 1735, Swift backed it and attested to its validity. Faulkner claimed that he and Swift had gone over every page in the Works, that Swift would read each page to two hired men who were by, and he would correct each line until the language was perfectly understandable to them. Nevertheless, Motte got an injunction forbidding the sale of Works in London.

Faulkner continued to court controversy: in 1736 he was briefly committed to Newgate for publishing a libel on Richard Bettesworth, MP for Midleton. The author was Dr Josiah Hort, Bishop of Kilmore, a friend of Swift, who also detested Bettesworth, both regarding him as a dangerous anti-clerical. The Bishop humorously suggested that all disputes about the card game quadrille be referred to Bettesworth for arbitration, but that since his judgment was suspect, an appeal should lie to the Upright Man, a wooden figure which hung in Essex Street, Dublin, and had never given a corrupt judgment. No action was taken against the Bishop, and Faulkner was released after making an apology.

Faulkner was Swift's Irish publisher for the rest of the latter's life. This association made Faulkner's name and generated a substantial income for him. He thereafter stayed in Dublin and made his visits to London much briefer.

== Plagiarism ==
In this period, Irish booksellers frequently published English books without making arrangements with the copyright holders. Motte accused Faulkner of plagiarism unjustly, but Faulkner was not above producing illicit editions. A book imported from London would be expensive for Irish readers, both due to the transportation, the importation fees, and the relative differences in currency. Irish labour was less expensive than London labour, and so Irish booksellers could produce Irish copies at a much lower cost than the authentic London editions. If an Irish bookseller made arrangements with a London bookseller who controlled the copyright, then the resulting edition would be more expensive than a plagiarized edition but less expensive than an import. Whenever possible, Faulkner relied on his trips to London and his friendships with London booksellers to arrange for authorized, Irish editions of works.

After the edition of Swift's Works, Faulkner began to boast of over 200 "London books". He produced the Irish edition of Alexander Pope's Works in 1736 and, illegally, Samuel Richardson's Pamela in 1741. Richardson was himself a printer, and he would eventually protest the plagiarism. Faulkner produced the largest publication yet attempted in Ireland in the form of The Universal History (1744–6), and he became a friend of the Earl of Chesterfield, who had become Lord Lieutenant of Ireland.

By 1748, Faulkner had over one thousand titles, and he published Irish authors such as Henry Brooke as well as English ones. His friendship with Chesterfield increased Faulkner's profile even more, and he was welcome at the most prestigious assemblies.

In 1754, Samuel Richardson freely distributed An Address to the Public to protest his treatment by Faulkner and other Irish printers. Faulkner had licensed to print Richardson's Clarissa, and he arranged to be the Irish publisher of Sir Charles Grandison in July 1753. However, by August, Faulkner had received only a few sheets of the first volume, while several other Irish printers were seemingly ready to print large portions of the novel. When Faulkner reported this to Richardson, he accused Faulkner of collusion with the other printers, who had bribed Richardson's workers to acquire proofs of the novel. Faulkner was caught between competing forces. By attempting to reprint texts legitimately, he had set himself against his less scrupulous countrymen, but by sometimes printing without a financial arrangement, he had already marked himself as a pirate.

Faulkner had been campaigning to get rid of the plagiarizing printers in Ireland, as they were competition, and yet he was so tarred with the charge of plagiarism that he was even excluded from scientific societies in England.

== Later years ==
In 1752, Faulkner was involved in a property transaction with the Right Honourable Margaret Countess of Orrery (Margaret Hamilton, second wife of the 5th Earl) involving substantial land holdings in Counties Tyrone and Armagh. (Note: Registry of Deeds, Dublin. Memorial: 157-391-105219. Registered 08/11/1752. A Memorial of an Indented Deed made the Twelfth day of October One Thousand Seven Hundred and Fifty Two Between the Right honble Margaret Countess of Orrery of the one part and George Faulkner of the City of Dublin, Bookseller and Stationer, of the other part Whereby the said Margaret Countess of Orrery in consideration of the sum of Five hundred pounds sterling to her in hand paid by the said George Faulkner did grant, demise, limitt and appoint unto the said George Faulkner All that and those the towns and lands of Stragrane, Leaghmacknabb, Killinore, Annaghroe, Annaghcramph, Mullinafeagh, Knockgerry, Caddin, Killmore, Kedew, Agasallaght, Annagh, Cavanbey, Cullogan, Dyan, Drumas, Gynee, Mullaghmore, Larakeen, Lisladown, Mullinter, Tullyremon, Tullyneshean, Mullinele, Mullincarron, Down, Mackmeagh, Ramakett, Mulloghmossogh, Tullyglise, Dromaghirrary, Killybride, Lissinill, Dugure, Potnelligan, Corefiaghan, Coolkill and Tullybrackitragh, the lower half of Tullybrackoutrough, Tullyglisoglody & Mullinall situate and being in the Countys of Tyrone and Armagh)

In 1755, Faulkner's wife died, and he himself suffered broken bones from a sign falling on him from a second storey. Sometime during these years, he bought a "villa" to which he would retire, and he took up gardening and entertaining.

In the 1760s, Faulkner was again eminent. His friendship with Chesterfield was very much to his advantage, and Faulkner was involved in scientific societies and historical societies in Ireland and England. On his visit to London in 1761, he was extremely popular as a speaker.

This high profile made him a target for satire. Samuel Foote took aim at Faulkner in his Orators of 1762. The character of Peter Paragraph is a one-legged publisher with a lisp. The play was acted in the Haymarket Theatre, where it was a success. While friends advised Faulkner to sue for libel, he stayed his hand. When the play was acted at Smock Alley Theatre in Dublin, however, Faulkner brought suit. While Faulkner won in the courts, the fine imposed upon Foote was trivial, and the episode did not cast the publisher in a good light. Faulkner, therefore, made sure to pirate Foote's play and publish it without licence.

In 1770, Faulkner was elected alderman of the city of Dublin. He handed his business over to his former apprentice, Thomas Todd. Faulkner had previously been involved in the Marriage Settlement of Thomas Todd to Mary Smith in January 1739. (Note: Registry of Deeds, Dublin. Memorial: 98-153-67953. Registered 21/01/1739. A Memorial of a Tripartite Deed of Settlement Indented dated the Fourth day of January One Thousand Seven Hundred & Thirty Nine made between Thomas Todd of the City of Dublin, Butcher, of the first part, Mary Smith of the same City, Widdow of Thomas Smith late of the same, Butcher, deceased, of the second part, and George Faulkner of the said City, Stationer, of the third part. By which said Settlement (after reciting a Marriage was then intended to be had between the said Thomas Todd and Mary Smith), she the said Mary Smith for the considerations therein mentioned did with the consent of the said Thomas Todd testified as therein mentioned, grant, assign and make over unto the said George Faulkner All that house in Bladoge Lane (possibly "Bradoge Lane") in the suburbs of the said City with a large yard contiguous to the same and the stable therein...) At that stage, Todd's profession had been noted as being that of a butcher. Todd, through Faulkner's connections and fame, published a twenty-volume edition of Swift's Works in 1772, and he published Chesterfield's Letters to his Son in 1774.

In 1771, Faulkner acted as mortgagor for fellow Dublin 'Stationer' (Printer) Matthew Williamson for a property on the south side of Dame Street, Dublin. (Note: Registry of Deeds, Dublin. Memorial: 283-647-187852. Registered 20/09/1771. A Memorial of a Deed of Mortgage bearing date the first day of August One Thousand Seven Hundred and Seventy One made between Mathew Williamson of the City of Dublin, Stationer, of the one part and George Faulkner of ye same City, Alderman, of the other part Whereby ye said Mathew Williamson in consideration of sixty pounds sterling did bargain, sell, demise and set unto ye said George Faulkner All that one house or tenement situate lying and being on ye south side of Dame Street, Dublin...) In Samuel Watson's "The Gentleman's and Citizen's Almanack" for the year 1792, a Matthew Williamson (Senior) was listed as being a printer at 12 Grafton Street.

Faulkner died on 30 August 1775 without issue.
