= Francis Brewster =

Francis Brewster may refer to:

- Francis Brewster (lord mayor) (fl. 1674–1702), alderman and lord mayor of Dublin, Ireland
- Francis Brewster (English MP) (1623–1671), member of parliament for Suffolk, and for Dunwich
- Francis Brewster (Irish MP) (fl. 1693–1713), member of parliament for Midleton, and for Dingle
