= John Hoadly =

English religious leader

The Most Reverend and Right Honourable John Hoadly PC (Ire)
- Archbishop of Armagh; Primate of All Ireland
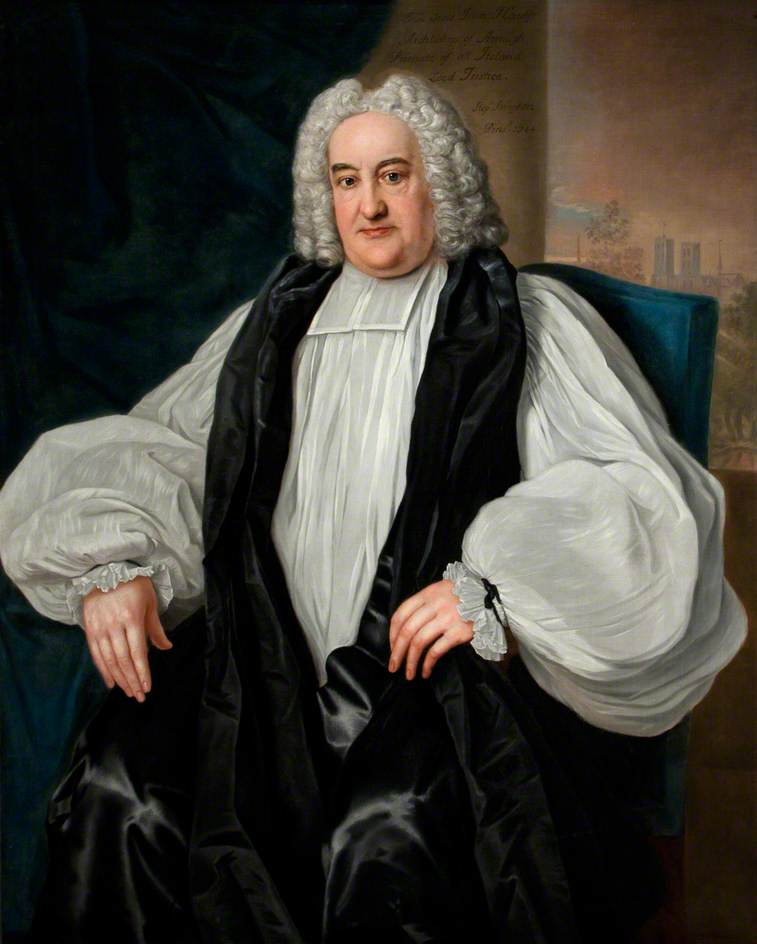
- Portrait by Stephen Slaughter
- Church: Church of Ireland
- See: Armagh
- Appointed: 21 October 1742
- In office: 1742-1746
- Predecessor: Hugh Boulter
- Successor: George Stone
- Previous posts: Bishop of Ferns and Leighlin (1727-1730); Archbishop of Dublin (1730-1742)

Orders
- Ordination: 7 September 1703 by John Moore
- Consecration: 3 September 1727 by William King

Personal details
- Born: 27 September 1678 Tottenham, Middlesex, England
- Died: 19 July 1746 (aged 67) Rathfarnham, Dublin, Ireland
- Denomination: Anglican
- Parents: Samuel Hoadly; Martha Pickering
- Children: 1
- Education: St Catharine's College, Cambridge

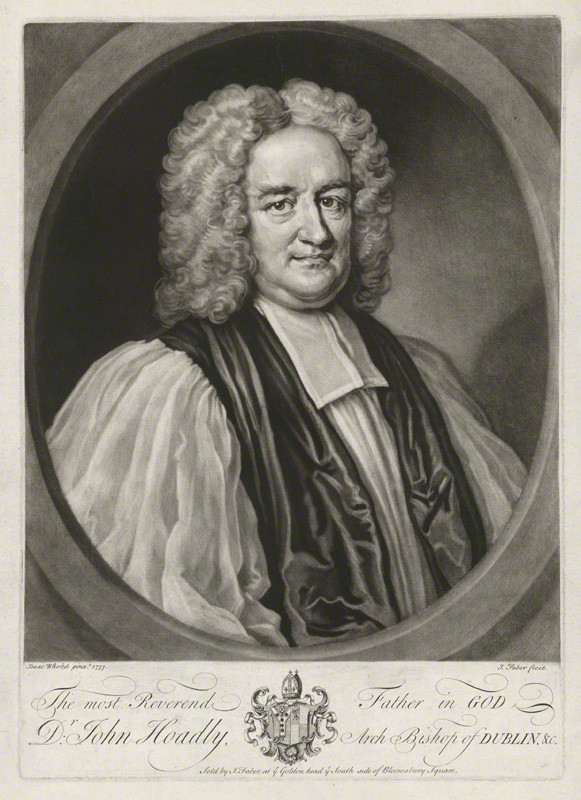
John Hoadly, 1733 engraving by John Faber the Younger after Isaac Whood.

John Hoadly (27 September 1678 – 19 July 1746) was an Anglican divine in the Church of Ireland. He served as Bishop of Ferns and Leighlin (1727 to 1730), as Archbishop of Dublin (1730 to 1742), and as Archbishop of Armagh from 1742 until his death.

== Life ==
He was born at Tottenham, Middlesex, 27 September 1678, son of Samuel Hoadly and Martha Pickering, and was a younger brother of Benjamin Hoadly. He was a member of St Catharine's Hall, Cambridge (B.A. 1697), and in September 1700 was appointed under-master of Norwich grammar school, of which his father was headmaster. After passing some years there he became chaplain to Bishop Gilbert Burnet, who gave him the rectory of St. Edmund's, Salisbury, and made him successively prebendary (21 February 1705–6), archdeacon (6 November 1710), and chancellor (16 April 1713) of Salisbury. The author of a pamphlet The Salisbury Quarrel Ended of 1710, relating to local conflicts, attributed to Hoadly's influence on the High Church party's troubles with Burnet. He was also attacked for his friendship with Thomas Chubb, whose views were considered to be dangerously unorthodox.

In 1717 Lord King, as chief justice of the common pleas, presented Hoadly to the rectory of Ockham, Surrey; and in 1727 he was consecrated bishop of Leighlin and Ferns. The theologian William Whiston protested because he thought Hoadly ignorant. In July 1729 a vacancy occurred in the archbishopric of Dublin, Hugh Boulter wrote to Sir Robert Walpole in support; and Hoadly was translated to Dublin in January 1730. As archbishop of Dublin, he built the residence of Tallaght at a cost of £2,500.

In October 1742 Hoadly became Archbishop of Armagh on Boulter's death, the Lord-Lieutenant of Ireland, the Duke of Devonshire, who was at court when the news arrived, telling the king that he could not do without him. As primate, he consented to the abolition of restrictions on Roman Catholic services. He was for many years a major force in Irish politics.

As Archbishop of Armagh, Hoadly served as one of the Lord Justices three times between 1742 and 1746.

Hoadly died at Rathfarnham, 19 July 1746, of a fever.

== Works ==
Hoadly's writings consisted of occasional sermons, a pastoral letter on the rebellion of 1745, a defence of Burnet's work on the articles against William Binckes, 1703, and a commentary on Bishop William Beveridge's writings. In the British Library Catalogue (accessed online 19 November 2012) are:

1. A Defence of the ... Bishop of Sarum in answer to a Book [by W. Binckes,] entituled A Prefatory Discourse to an Examination of the Bishop of Sarum's Exposition of the XXXIX. Articles, etc. London : A. Baldwin, 1703.
2. The abasement of pride: a sermon preach'd in the cathedral of Salisbury, at the assizes held for the county of Wilts, July the 18th. 1708. upon occasion of the late victory. London : printed for Tim. Childe, 1708. Great Britain England London.
3. An Answer to a Letter from a Citizen of New Sarum being a true account of the affront offer'd the Bishop [G. Burnet] there: and a fresh proof of the mallice and injustice of his enemies. [1710]

== Family ==
Hoadly's only daughter, Sarah, married on 29 November 1740 Bellingham Boyle (b. 1709), M.P. for Bandon Bridge, a distant cousin of the Irish Speaker Henry Boyle.

Church of Ireland titles
Preceded by Josiah Hort	Bishop of Ferns and Leighlin; 1727–1730	Succeeded by Arthur Price
Preceded by William King	Archbishop of Dublin; 1730–1742	Succeeded by Charles Cobbe
Preceded by Hugh Boulter	Archbishop of Armagh; 1742–1746	Succeeded by George Stone
