= Carteret Leathes =

English politician

Carteret Leathes (July 1698 – 1780), of Oakley House, near Harwich, Essex, was a British politician who sat in the House of Commons from 1727 to 1747.

== Early life ==
Leathes was born Mussenden, the eldest son of John Mussenden of Hillsborough, County Down and his wife Jane Leathes, daughter of Adam Leathes. He matriculated at Wadham College, Oxford in 1717. He married Loveday Garrod, daughter of S. Garrod of Lincolnshire. In 1727, he succeeded his uncle William Leathes (resident at Brussels c.1718-24) and assumed name of Leathes 1727.

== Political career ==
Leathes’ inheritance included an estate near Harwich, where he intended to stand at the 1727 British general election, but in the event was returned as Member of Parliament for Sudbury. In 1733 he was described as ‘a friend to the Government, a sure one, and has not given a vote against us’. In 1733 Leathes applied to Walpole for the government interest at Harwich for the next election, and Walpole agreed that this should go to Leathes and Lord Perceval, standing jointly. At the 1734 British general election, Leathes said he could not persuade his supporters to go along with the compact, and he joined with Charles Stanhope, against Perceval. Leathes became Recorder of Harwich in 1734.

At the 1741 British general election he nominated his brother, Hill Mussenden, to replace him at Harwich, and went back to Sudbury. He supported the Administration until the end of 1743, when he and his brother voted with the Opposition on a motion to discontinue the service of the Hanoverians from British pay. They abstained from both the two subsequent divisions on the Hanoverians in 1744 and 1746. He lost control of Harwich at the 1747 British general election when his brother was replaced there by a government nominee.

== Later life ==
Leathes never stood for election again, but continued to play a part in Harwich politics.

Leathes married Loveday Garrod. He died in 1780 leaving three sons and a daughter.

Parliament of Great Britain
Preceded by John Knight; Colonel William Windham	Member of Parliament for Sudbury; 1727–1734; With: John Knight 1727-1734; Richard Jackson 1734	Succeeded by Richard Price; Edward Stephenson
Preceded by Sir Philip Parker-a-Morley-Long, Bt; John Perceval	Member of Parliament for Harwich; 1734–1741; With: Charles Stanhope	Succeeded by John Phillipson; Hill Mussenden
Preceded by Richard Price; Edward Stephenson	Member of Parliament for Sudbury; 1741–1747; With: Thomas Fonnereau	Succeeded by Thomas Fonnereau; Richard Rigby
