= St John Brodrick (disambiguation) =

St John Brodrick may refer to:

- Sir St John Brodrick (1627–1711), Irish MP
- St John Brodrick (1659–1707), Irish MP
- St John Brodrick (died 1728), Irish MP
- St John Brodrick, 1st Earl of Midleton (1856–1942), Irish politician
