= John Perceval, 1st Earl of Egmont =

Anglo-Irish politician, later viscount

The Right Honourable The Earl of Egmont PC FRS
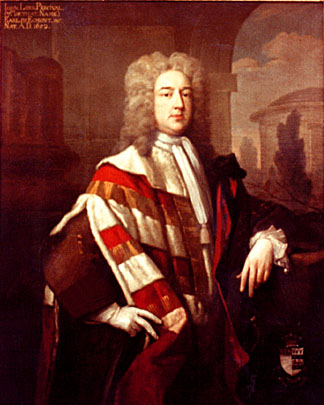
- John Perceval, 1st Earl of Egmont

Member of the Dublin Parliament for County Cork
- In office 1703–1715 Serving with: Thomas Brodrick 1703–1713; Alan Brodrick 1713–1715
- Preceded by: Sir St John Brodrick; Thomas Brodrick
- Succeeded by: Henry Boyle; St John Brodrick

Member of Parliament for Harwich
- In office 1727–1734 Serving with Sir Philip Parker, Bt
- Preceded by: Humphry Parsons; Sir Philip Parker, Bt
- Succeeded by: Charles Stanhope; Carteret Leathes

Personal details
- Born: 12 July 1683 Burton, County Cork, Ireland
- Died: 1 May 1748 (aged 64) London, England
- Spouse: Catherine Parker
- Children: 7, including John

John Perceval, 1st Earl of Egmont, PC, FRS (12 July 1683 – 1 May 1748), known as Sir John Perceval, Bt, from 1691 to 1715, as the Lord Perceval from 1715 to 1722 and as the Viscount Perceval from 1722 to 1733, was an Anglo-Irish politician.

== Early life and heritage ==
Arms of Perceval, Earls of Egmont: Quarterly 1st & 4th: Argent, on a chief indented gules three crosses patée of the field (Perceval); 2nd & 3rd: Barry nebulée of six or and gules (Lovel)

Perceval was born at Burton, County Cork, the second son of Sir John Perceval, 3rd Baronet, and Catherine, daughter of Sir Edward Dering, 2nd Baronet. His great-grandfather was Sir Philip Perceval (1605–1647), who had obtained estates in Ireland and England from his father, Sir Richard Perceval (1550–1620), through the death of his elder brother, Walter. Richard Perceval in 1616 had sold a great part (£1,200 a year, according to Lodge) of his ancient patrimony, and invested the sum realised in purchases and mortgages in County Cork, thus laying the foundation of the prosperity and property of his family there.

Sir Philip had three children by Catherine Ussher: Judith, John and George. John would later become the first Baronet and grandfather to Egmont; George would father the Very Reverend William Perceval, grandfather to, amongst others, the Irish landlord Robert Perceval-Maxwell (1813–1905), William Perceval and Spencer Perceval, who together would purchase, administer and settle Amherst Island in Upper Canada.

John Perceval's father died when he was two, and in 1691, he succeeded his elder brother as fifth Baronet. The following year his mother also died. Perceval was educated at Westminster School, London, and at Magdalen College, Oxford. However, he left university without taking a degree.

== Career ==
In 1703, he was elected to the Irish House of Commons for County Cork, and in 1704 he was admitted to the Irish Privy Council. Perceval was again elected for County Cork in 1713. He sat until 1715, when he was raised to the Peerage of Ireland as Baron Perceval, of Burton in the County of Cork, with remainder to the heirs male of his father. In 1722, he was created Viscount Perceval, of Kanturk in the County of Cork, in the Peerage of Ireland, with remainder to his heirs male. Lord Perceval was elected to the British House of Commons for Harwich in 1727, which constituency he continued to represent until 1734, and was also a Recorder of Harwich from 1728 to 1734. In 1733, he was further honoured when he was made Earl of Egmont in the Peerage of Ireland. However, he rejected the offer of a British peerage three times. Apart from his political career, he was also a Fellow of the Royal Society.

In 1728 he became a member of the committee of Parliament investigating prison conditions. He soon became a close associate of James Oglethorpe, who chaired the committee. In 1730, the two men were among those who formed an association that later became the Trustees for the Establishment of the Colony of Georgia in America. George II approved a charter for the colony in 1732, making Egmont president of the Georgia Trustees. He and Oglethorpe, working with several other close associates, devised an elaborate plan for the settlement of the colony now famously known as the Oglethorpe Plan. He actively superintended the colonisation of Georgia, withholding 'neither money, time, nor influence in his ceaseless efforts to advance what he conceived to be the best interests of the province,’ and keeping with his own hand 'A Journal of the Transactions of the Trustees,’ &c., the second and third volumes of which have been printed.

== Diary ==
His diary (published by the Historical Manuscripts Commission) is an important source on Parliamentary History in the 1730s and early 1740s.

== Family ==
Lord Egmont married Catherine, daughter of Sir Philip Parker, 2nd Baronet, in 1710. They had seven children, three sons and four daughters. Only three of the children reached adulthood.

- John (1711–1770), who succeeded him as the second Earl of Egmont
- Catherine (died 16 February 1748), who was married, on 14 April 1733, to Thomas Hanmer of Fenns, Flintshire (died 1 April 1737)
- Anne, born 12 May 1713, who died an infant
- Philip Clarke, born 21 June 1714, who also died an infant
- Mary, born 28 December 1716, who also died an infant
- Helena (14 February 1718 – 12 June 1746, who was married, on 10 November 1741, to Sir John Rawdon, bart. (afterwards first Earl of Moira).
- George (28 January 1722 – July 1726)

Lady Egmont died on 22 August 1749. Engravings of Egmont and his wife by Faber, after Hysing and Gouge respectively, can be found in vol. ii. of the "Genealogical History of the House of Yvery," opposite pp. 403 and 444. A whole-length portrait of Egmont by Godfrey Kneller was engraved by John Smith.

Lord Egmont died in London in May 1748, aged 64, and was succeeded in the earldom by his eldest and only surviving son John. The latter's seventh son was Prime Minister Spencer Perceval.

== See also ==
- Earl of Egmont

== Sources ==
- Lee, Sidney, ed. (1895). "Perceval, John (1683-1748)" . Dictionary of National Biography. Vol. 44. London: Smith, Elder & Co.
- Kidd, Charles, Williamson, David (editors). Debrett's Peerage and Baronetage (1990 edition). New York: St Martin's Press, 1990.

Parliament of Ireland
Preceded by Sir St John Brodrick; Thomas Brodrick	Member of Parliament for County Cork; 1703–1715; With: Thomas Brodrick 1703–1713; Alan Brodrick 1713–1715	Succeeded by Henry Boyle; St John Brodrick
Parliament of Great Britain
Preceded by Humphry Parsons; Sir Philip Parker, Bt	Member of Parliament for Harwich; 1727–1734; With: Sir Philip Parker, Bt	Succeeded by Charles Stanhope; Carteret Leathes
Peerage of Ireland
New creation	Earl of Egmont; 1733–1748	Succeeded by John Perceval
New creation	Viscount Perceval; 1722–1748	Succeeded by John Perceval
New creation	Baron Perceval; 1715–1748	Succeeded by John Perceval
Baronetage of Ireland
Preceded by Edward Perceval	Baronet (of Kanturk); 1691–1748	Succeeded by John Perceval
