= Charles Stanhope (1673–1760) =

English barrister and Whig politician

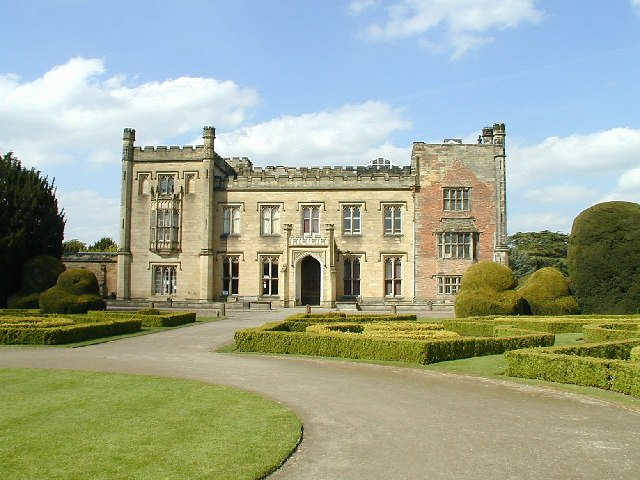

Charles Stanhope (1673—1760) was an English barrister and Whig politician who sat in the House of Commons from 1717 to 1741. Deeply implicated in transactions related to the South Sea Company, possibly concerned with political corruption, he was strongly defended by those in government, and was acquitted of all charges brought against him.

== Early life ==
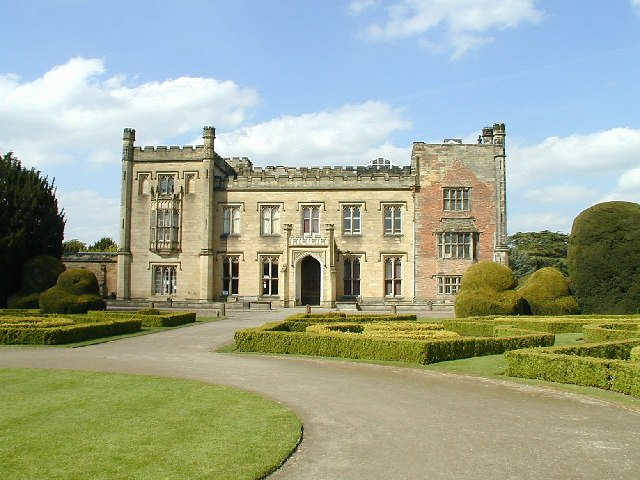
Elvaston Castle, Derbyshire today - the Stanhope family seat as rebuilt c.1817

Stanhope was the second son of John Stanhope of Elvaston, Derbyshire, and his wife Dorothy Agard, daughter of Charles Agard of Foston, Derbyshire. He was admitted at the Inner Temple and was called to the bar in 1703. He succeeded his elder brother Thomas to the family estates in 1730.

== Career ==
Stanhope was the cousin of James Stanhope, 1st Earl Stanhope who made him his under-secretary in 1714. He stood for Parliament at Milborne Port in a by-election on 10 June 1717, and though initially defeated, he was seated on petition as Member of Parliament on 6 July 1717. He served as Secretary to the Treasury from 1717 to 1721. James Stanhope and Charles Spencer, 3rd Earl of Sunderland were investigated over dealings in South Sea Company stock after the Bubble, and Charles Stanhope also; but he avoided the ruin of political career that came upon Sunderland.

At the 1722 general election Stanhope was given the safe seat of Aldborough by the Duke of Newcastle, being returned unopposed then and at the 1727 general election. Stanhope was seeking procurement, but the new King George II discovered among his father's papers a note written by Stanhope with proposals for drastic action against him during a family quarrel. The King blocked any favours towards Stanhope, but Stanhope attributed his failure to secure office to Walpole and became his bitter enemy. While he owed his seat to Newcastle, he supported the government in all divisions except on the civil list arrears in 1729. At the 1734 general election he was elected in a contest as MP for Harwich on his own interest, and went over to the Opposition. He did not stand in 1741.

Stanhope became a Fellow of the Royal Society in 1726.

== Death and legacy ==
Stanhope died unmarried in 1760. His younger brother was William Stanhope, 1st Earl of Harrington, the father of William Stanhope, 2nd Earl of Harrington.

== Notes ==
Parliament of Great Britain
Preceded by Michael Harvey; James Medlycott	Member of Parliament for Milborne Port; 1717–1722; With: James Medlycott	Succeeded by Michael Harvey; George Speke
Preceded by William Monson; William Jessop	Member of Parliament for Aldborough; 1722–1734; With: William Jessop	Succeeded by Henry Pelham; William Jessop
Preceded by Sir Philip Parker-a-Morley-Long, Bt; John Perceval	Member of Parliament for Harwich; 1734–1741; With: Carteret Leathes	Succeeded by John Phillipson; Hill Mussenden
