= Henry Boyle, 1st Earl of Shannon =

Anglo-Irish politician (1682–1764)

The Right Honourable The Earl of Shannon PC
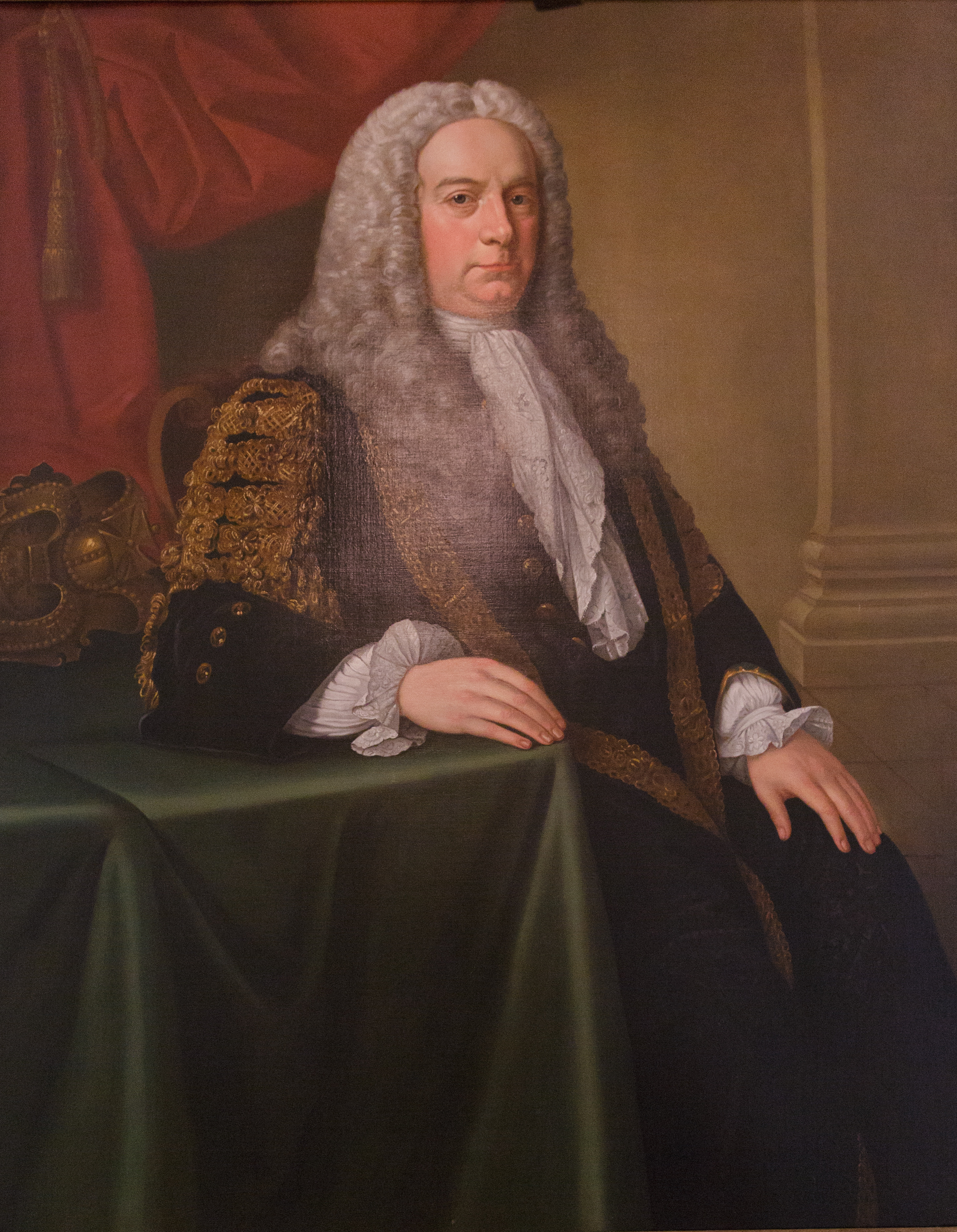
- Portrait by Stephen Slaughter, 1744

Speaker of the Irish House of Commons
- In office 1733–1756
- Monarch: George II
- Preceded by: Sir Ralph Gore
- Succeeded by: John Ponsonby

Member of Parliament for Midleton
- In office 1707–1713
- Preceded by: St John Brodrick; Robert Foulke
- Succeeded by: Arthur Hyde; Jephson Busteed

Member of Parliament for Kilmallock
- In office 1713–1715
- Preceded by: John Ormsby; Robert Oliver
- Succeeded by: Kilner Brasier; George King

Member of Parliament for County Cork
- In office 1715–1756
- Preceded by: Sir John Perceval; Alan Brodrick
- Succeeded by: Arthur Hyde; Charles Boyle

Personal details
- Born: c. 1682 Castlemartyr, County Cork
- Died: 27 December 1764 (aged 81–82) Dublin, County Dublin
- Spouse(s): Catherine Coote (m. 1715); Lady Henrietta Boyle (m. 1726)
- Children: 6, including Richard and Robert
- Education: Christ Church, Oxford

Henry Boyle, 1st Earl of Shannon, PC (Ire) (1682 – 27 December 1764), was an Anglo-Irish politician who served as the speaker of the Irish House of Commons from 1733 to 1756. A prominent parliamentarian who sat for almost fifty years in the Parliament of Ireland, Boyle frequently defended Irish interests against British Crown officials, eventually leading to a legal crisis which saw him step down as speaker in return for a peerage.

Born c. 1682 in Castlemartyr, Ireland to an Anglo-Irish family, Boyle was educated in England at Westminster School and the University of Oxford. In 1705, Boyle inherited the family estates in Ireland after his elder brother died. Two years later in 1707, Boyle entered the Irish political scene, being elected to the Parliament of Ireland and successively representing the constituencies of Midleton, Kilmallock and County Cork for almost five decades.

In 1733, Boyle, by now the leader of a large group of Irish politicians known as the "Munster squadron", was elected as speaker of Ireland's House of Commons. He was appointed to the Irish revenue board two years later, and was also chosen to serve as a Lord Justice of Ireland fifteen separate times throughout his career. For the next two decades, Boyle effectively presided over Irish political affairs as one of the leading politicians in Ireland.

A legal crisis broke out in 1753 when the incumbent viceroy, the Duke of Dorset, dismissed Boyle due to the failure of a money bill. This triggered a standoff which was not resolved until the Marquess of Hartington was appointed as viceroy in 1755, who negotiated a settlement with Boyle that saw him step down as speaker in return for being raised to the peerage as the Earl of Shannon. Boyle eventually died of a gout attack in Dublin in 1764.

== Early life ==
Henry Boyle was born c. 1682 in Castlemartyr, County Cork, Ireland. His father was Lieutenant-Colonel Henry Boyle, an English Army officer who was the son of Roger Boyle, 1st Earl of Orrery. Boyle's father was killed in action in 1693 during the War of the League of Augsburg while serving under fellow English Army officer John Churchill in Flanders. His mother was Lady Mary O'Brien, the daughter of Murrough O'Brien, 1st Earl of Inchiquin.

Growing up, Boyle was educated at Westminster School in London, where he received a Queen's Scholarship in 1702. After graduating from Westminster School, Boyle attended Christ Church College at the University of Oxford before matriculating in March 1705. In the same year, he inherited the family estates in Castlemartyr after his elder brother Roger died; they had been severely damaged during the Williamite War in Ireland.

In 1707, Boyle decided to enter into a political career, representing the parliamentary constituency of Midleton in the House of Commons of the Irish Parliament after taking his seat on 7 July. Boyle continued to represent Midleton until 2 November 1713, when he started representing Kilmallock in the same month until October 1714. Boyle again entered the Irish Parliament in October 1715, representing the constituency of County Cork.

== Parliamentary career ==
In 1729, Boyle successfully resisted an attempt by the Dublin Castle administration to pass through a bill in the Irish Parliament which stipulated that Ireland would continue to deliver supplies to the British Crown for 21 years. Sir Robert Walpole, the incumbent Prime Minister of Great Britain, was impressed by Boyle's actions, dubbing him "the King of the Irish Commons". On 28 April 1733, he started serving on the Privy Council of Ireland.

By this point in his career, Boyle had become leader of the "Munster squadron", a group of politicians whose main support base resided in the Irish counties of Cork and Waterford. The support he gained from this group allowed Boyle to widen his political ambitions beyond what was previously possible; in 1729, after William Conolly died, Boyle had considered running for speaker of the Irish House of Commons, but decided against it.

During this period, Boyle began large-scale renovation efforts at his estates at Castlemartyr and repair work in the town, aimed at gradually fixing the damage caused by the Williamite War in Ireland. On 4 October 1733, Boyle was elected as speaker of the Irish House of Commons. In November of the same year, Boyle was also appointed Chancellor of the Exchequer of Ireland, a sinecure with an annual salary of 800 pounds.

As noted by historian Eoin Magennis, "Boyle's period as speaker and chief undertaker was largely a quiet one because there was no serious threat of a money bill between 1733 and 1753". (Note: A money bill was controversial because it would have led to disputes between the Irish and British governments over which government had the ultimate say over how Ireland's tax revenue would be utilised.) From 1734 until his death, Boyle became the leading politician in Ireland, being appointed as Lord Justice fifteen times over the course of his career. On 12 September 1735, Boyle was appointed to the Irish revenue board, serving as its commissioner.

Despite his influence in Parliament, Boyle was viewed with suspicion by successive viceroys of Ireland due to both his opposition to unpopular measures supported by the Dublin Castle administration and Boyle's effective political skills. During his career as speaker, Boyle used his influence to pressure several viceroys into supporting the anti-Catholic Penal Laws and the use of Crown revenue to aid Ireland's economy and industries.

== Political crisis and death ==
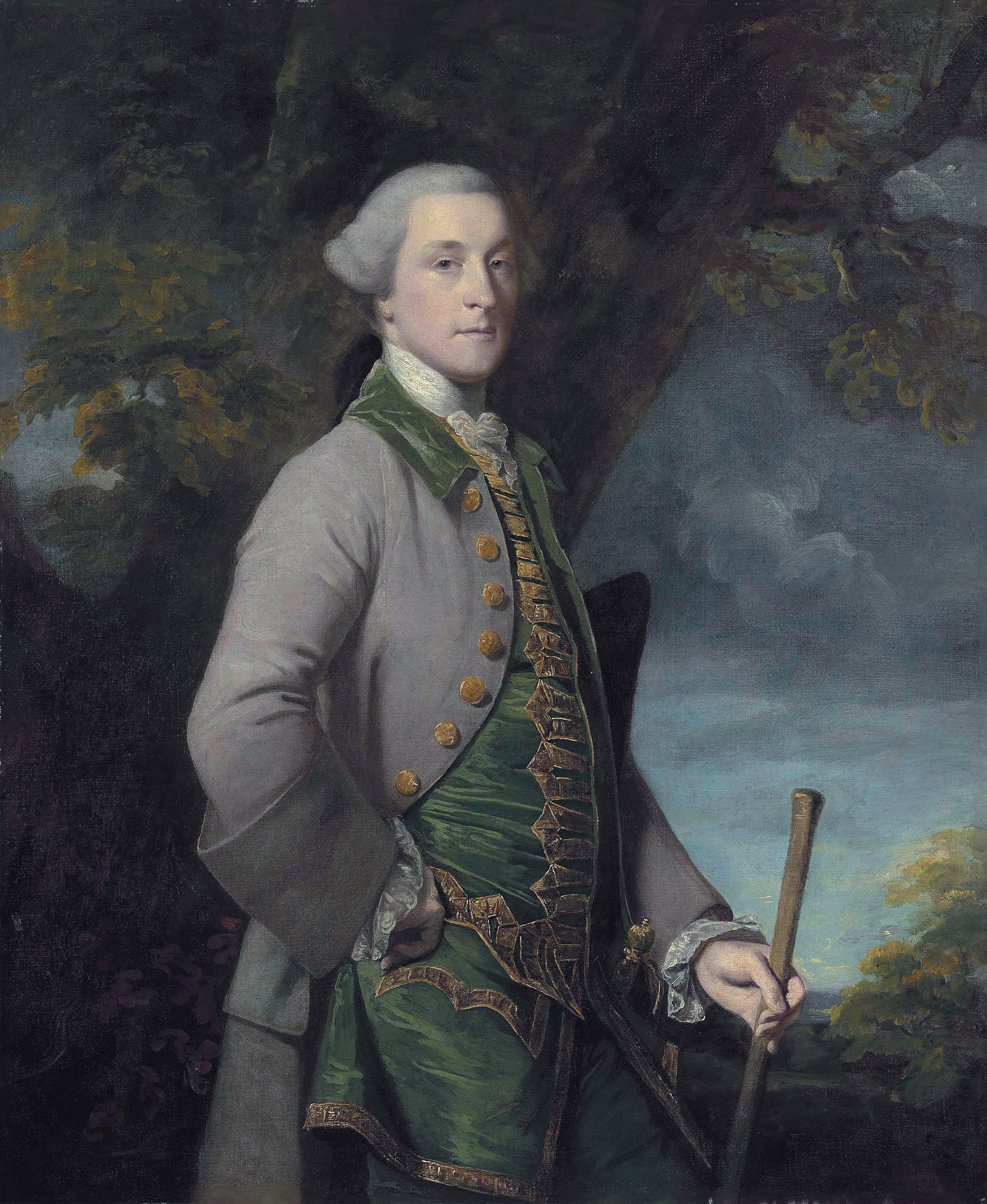
A portrait of Boyle's son Richard by Sir Joshua Reynolds c. 1759

In 1753, a legal crisis broke out between Boyle and incumbent viceroy the Duke of Dorset over a disputed money bill. The bill, which was drafted by the British Privy Council and stipulated that surplus Irish tax revenue would be sent to Britain, failed to pass through the Irish Parliament. Acting in support of Boyle's political opponents George Stone and John Ponsonby, the Duke prorogued parliament on 1754 and dismissed Boyle from all of his offices.

Boyle chose to resist his dismissal, and the dispute soon transformed into a struggle between the British and Irish parliaments over who had the final say over how Ireland's revenues were used. Mounting concerns in British government circles of a possible conflict with France and the disruptions to Ireland's political scene caused by the ongoing crisis eventually led to the Duke being replaced as viceroy by the Marquess of Hartington in March 1755.

Once he had assumed office, the Marquess of Hartington quickly negotiated a settlement with Boyle with the authorisation of his superiors. The terms of the settlement stipulated that Boyle was to step down from his position as speaker, in return for being raised to the peerage of Ireland as the Earl of Shannon and being granted an annual pension of 2,000 pounds for 31 years. On 17 April 1756, Boyle stepped down as speaker and took his seat in the House of Lords.

Boyle was appointed as the Lord Lieutenant of Cork on 3 May 1756. After the crisis was over, Boyle was denounced by his contemporaries as unpatriotic for coming to an agreement with the viceroy. Despite this, he retained many supporters in parliament, and was persuaded by the Dublin Castle administration to again serve as Lord Justice in April 1758. This was done to provide the Duke of Bedford's administration with more credibility in the Irish Parliament.

On 27 December 1764, Boyle died of a sudden attack of gout in his stomach at Boyle's townhouse on Henrietta Street, Dublin at the age of 82. His corpse was interred in St Patrick's Cathedral four days later on 31 December. News of his death quickly reached England; Boyle's death was noted in a letter written by English bluestocking and artist Mary Delany, who wrote that as Boyle's long time rival Stone had died recently as well (he died on 19 December), news of their deaths would "cause some emotion in [Britain's] body politic."

== Personal life and family ==
According to Magennis, Boyle "had created a remarkable rise in fortunes for his branch of the Cork family, coming from minor beginnings to create an electoral interest and landed estate which survived him". For several decades, Boyle dominated Irish politics, amassing a large following in Ireland's Parliament which by 1753 amounted to forty members of parliament. Though he owned properties in both Castlemartyr and Dublin, several contemporaries noted that Boyle preferred to spend most of his time residing in the family estates, ascribing it to Boyle's "bucolic indifference".

Through his extensive skills in political patronage and managing elections, Boyle eventually rose (in Magennis' view) to be "the most effective undertaker or Irish parliamentary manager before 1800." In Parliament, Boyle's interests were based largely in part on his family connections; one of the earliest such connections Boyle forged was with a distant family relative Alan Brodrick, 1st Viscount Midleton, who frequently supported him during Boyle's early election campaigns. By the 1730s, Boyle had become one of the most important officials in the Dublin Castle administration.

Boyle married his first wife Catherine Coote in 1715; they had no children before she died on 5 May 1725. On 22 December 1726, he remarried Lady Henrietta Boyle, a distant cousin who was the daughter of the 2nd Earl of Burlington. Together, the couple had five sons and a daughter before Henrietta died on 13 December 1746. Three of Boyle's sons died young, and the eldest surviving one, Richard, succeeded to his father's titles in December 1764. In his will and testament, Boyle named Richard as the heir to his estates. Another son, Robert, joined the Royal Navy.

In addition to his renovation efforts at Castlemartyr, Boyle also undertook similar projects at the 2nd Earl of Burlington's Irish estates, who entrusted him with the responsibility of managing them. The Irish historian Sir John Thomas Gilbert noted in the Dictionary of National Biography that Boyle's efforts there "much enhanced their value, and [he] carried out and promoted extensive improvements". In 1744, Boyle commissioned English painter Stephen Slaughter to paint an oil-on-canvas portrait of him, which as of 2021 resides in the Palace of Westminster collection.

Parliament of Ireland
Preceded by St John Brodrick; Robert Foulke	Member of Parliament for Midleton; 1707–1713; With: Robert Foulke	Succeeded by Arthur Hyde; Jephson Busteed
Preceded by John Ormsby; Robert Oliver	Member of Parliament for Kilmallock; 1713–1715; With: Sir Philips Coote	Succeeded by Kilner Brasier; George King
Preceded by Sir John Perceval; Alan Brodrick	Member of Parliament for County Cork; 1715–1756; With: St John Brodrick 1715–1728; Sir Matthew Deane 1728–1747; Arthur Hyde 1747–1756	Succeeded by Arthur Hyde; Charles Boyle
Political offices
Preceded by Sir Ralph Gore	Speaker of the Irish House of Commons; 1733–1756	Succeeded by John Ponsonby
Peerage of Ireland
New creation	Earl of Shannon; 1756–1764	Succeeded by Richard Boyle
New creation	Viscount Boyle; 1756–1764	Succeeded by Richard Boyle
New creation	Baron Castle Martyr; 1756–1764	Succeeded by Richard Boyle
