= Natural method =

Natural method may refer to:

- Direct method (education), a language teaching method established around 1900
- Natural method ("la méthode naturelle"), a system of physical education created by Georges Hébert

== See also ==
- Natural Method of Teaching, a 1683 combined English and Latin grammar written by Samuel Hoadly
- Natural family planning, the family planning methods approved by the Roman Catholic Church
- Naturopathy, a form of alternative medicine
- Natural approach, a language teaching method developed in the late 1970s and early 1980s
