= George Smalridge =

Bishop of Bristol

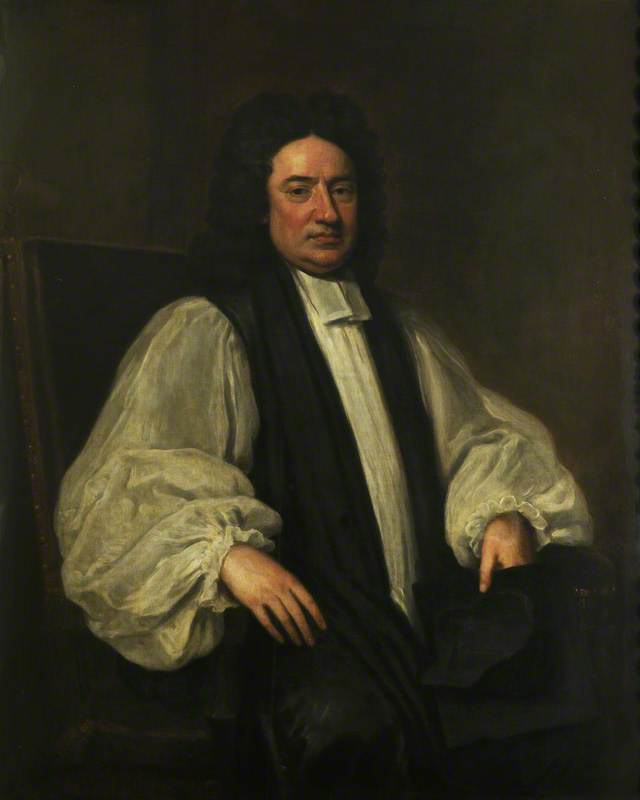
Portrait of Smalridge by Godfrey Kneller, c. 1714

George Smalridge (alias Smallridge; 18 May 1662 – 27 September 1719) was Bishop of Bristol (1714–1719).

== Life ==
Smalridge was born at Lichfield, son of the Sheriff of Lichfield Thomas Smalridge, George received his early education, this being completed at Westminster School and at Christ Church, Oxford.

His political opinions were largely modelled on those of his friend Francis Atterbury, with whom he was associated at Oxford and elsewhere. After being a tutor at Christ Church, he was minister of two chapels in London, and for six or seven years he acted as deputy for William Jane, the regius professor of divinity at Oxford; his Jacobite opinions, however, prevented him from securing this position when it fell vacant in 1707.

In 1711, he was made dean of Carlisle Cathedral and canon of Christ Church, and in 1713 he succeeded Atterbury as dean of Christ Church. In the following year he was appointed bishop of Bristol, but retained his deanery. In 1715 Smalridge refused to sign the declaration against the pretender, James Francis Edward Stuart, defending his action in his Reasons for not signing the Declaration. In other ways also he showed animus against the house of Hanover, but his only punishment was his removal from the post of lord almoner to the king.

The bishop was esteemed by Swift, Steele, Whiston and other famous men of his day, while Dr Johnson declared his sermons to be of the highest class.

== Works ==
- Sixty Sermons, preached on Several Occasions, 1726. Other editions 1827, 1832, 1853 and 1862.
- The Life of Grabe

Academic offices
Preceded by Francis Atterbury	Dean of Christ Church, Oxford; 1713–1719	Succeeded by Hugh Boulter
Church of England titles
Preceded by Francis Atterbury	Dean of Carlisle; 1711–1713	Succeeded by Thomas Gibbon
Preceded by John Robinson	Bishop of Bristol; 1714–1719	Succeeded by Hugh Boulter
