= Judith Lewis (painter) =

English equestrian painter

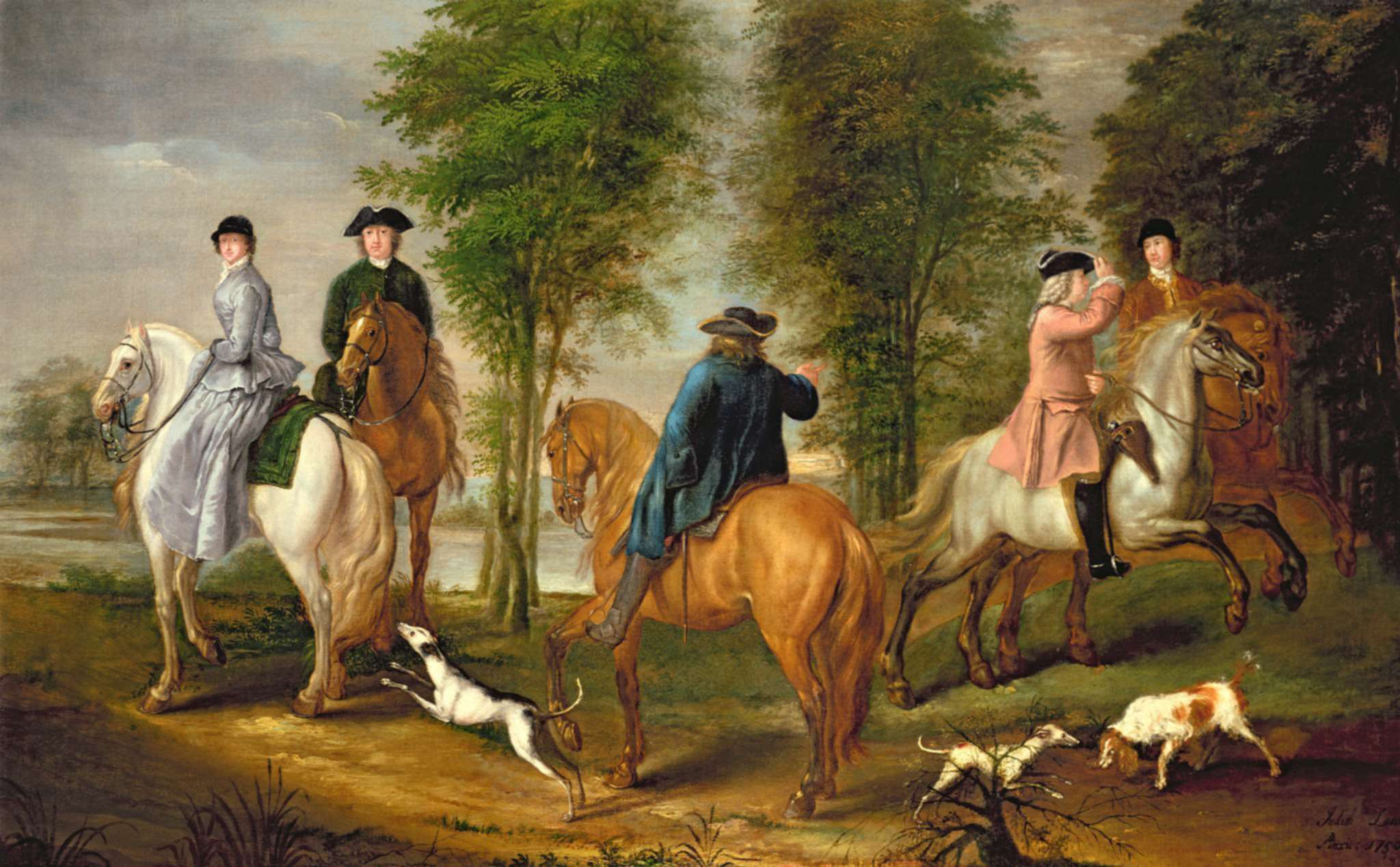
- Family Hunting Party (1756) by Judith Lewis
- Died: 6 April 1781
- Occupation: Painter
- Spouse(s): John Lewis
- Relatives: Stephen Slaughter

Judith Slaughter Lewis (died 6 April 1781) was an English equestrian painter.

Judith Lewis was the sister of painter Stephen Slaughter. She later married John Lewis, though historians disagree on whether or not this was the same man as the Irish painter.

She exhibited her work with the Society of Artists of Great Britain and it was praised by Horace Walpole, who wrote that she "excelled in imitating bronzes and bas reliefs to the highest degree of deception". Two signed canvases by her are known to exist, both equestrian conversation pieces in the style of John Wootton. A third canvas bears her initials, a portrait of two children, Herbert Hickman Windsor and Charlotte Jane Windsor, in a landscape. Some art experts believe the children are by Thomas Frye and only the landscape and animals by Lewis.

Judith Lewis died on 6 April 1781.
