= Philip Parker-a-Morley-Long =

English politician (1682–1741)

Sir Philip Parker-a-Morley-Long, 3rd Baronet (1682 – 20 January 1741) was an English landowner and politician who sat in the House of Commons for Harwich from 1715 to 1734.

== Early life ==
Parker was born at Arwarton, Suffolk, the son of Sir Philip Parker, 2nd Baronet, and Mary Fortrey, daughter of Samuel Fortrey.

== Career ==
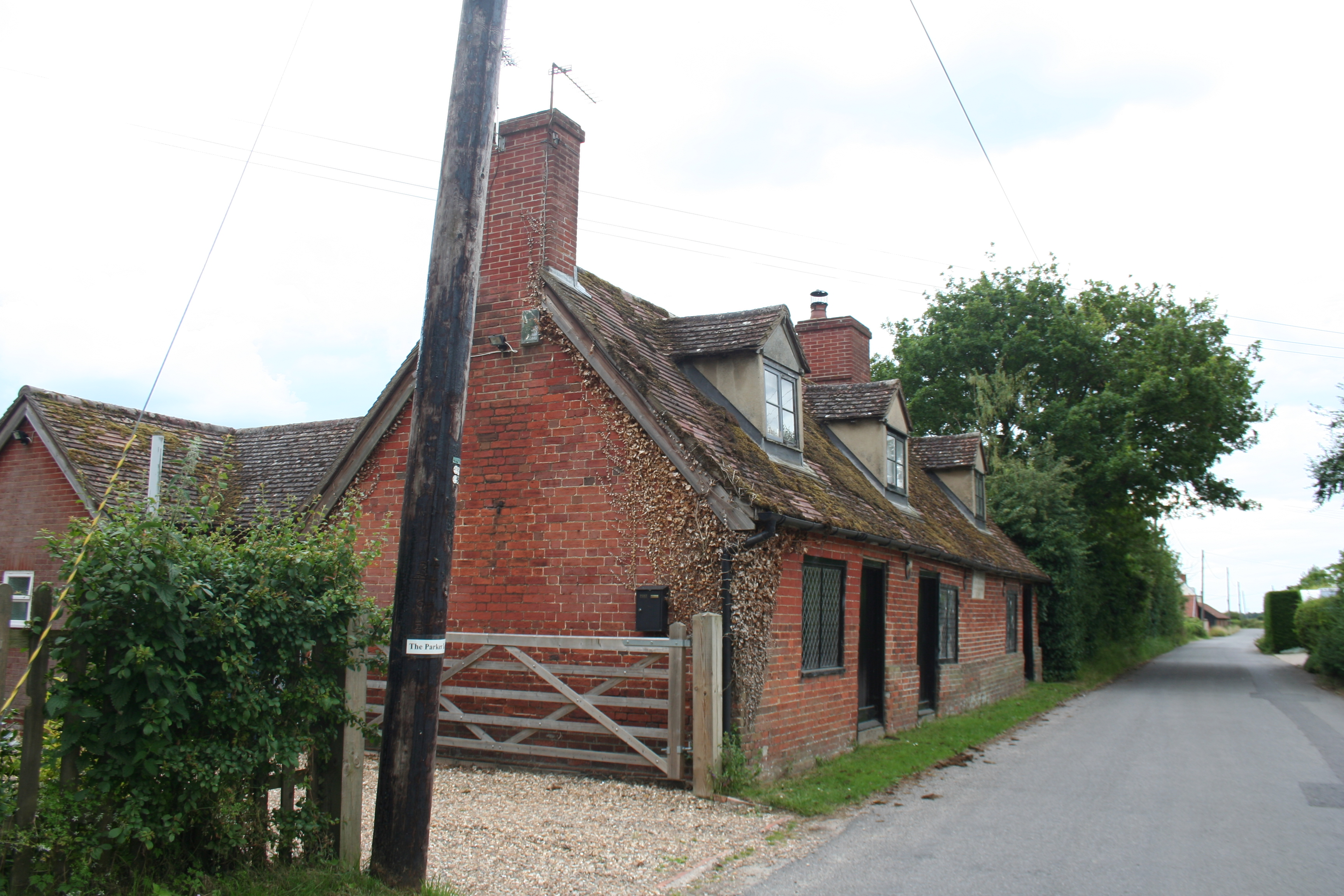
Erwarton Amshouses in 2014

In 1710 he took the name of Long on inheriting the estate of Whaddon in Wiltshire from his great-uncle Sir Walter Long. The original Coat of Long was, through some error, allowed to him by the College of Arms. He successfully stood for parliament in the 1715 general election, being returned as Member of Parliament (MP) for Harwich. He held the seat until 1734.

In 1740 he founded the Erwarton Almshouses close to his home in Erwarton.

== Family ==
On 11 July 1715 Parker married in London, Martha East (daughter of William East of the Middle Temple) and they had four daughters:

- Martha (1716–1775) married John Howe, 2nd Baron Chedworth
- Elizabeth (1717–1757)
- Katherine (b. 1719)
- Dyonisia (b. 1722)

== Death ==
On 20 January 1741, John Perceval, 1st Earl of Egmont wrote in his diary:

"This morning died my brother-in-law Sir Philip Parker, at 3 o'clock, choked by one of those fits he has had for 12 weeks past at sundry times."

Parliament of Great Britain
Preceded by Carew Harvey Mildmay; Benedict Calvert	Member of Parliament for Harwich; 1715–1734; With: Thomas Heath 1715–1722; Humphry Parsons 1722–1727; The Viscount Perceval 1734–1741	Succeeded by Carteret Leathes; Charles Stanhope
Baronetage of England
Preceded by Philip Parker	Baronet (of Arwarton); 1696–1741	Extinct
