= William East (1695–1737) =

William East (c. 1695–1737), of the Manor House, Kennington, Surrey and Hall Place, Hurley, Berkshire, was a British politician who sat in the House of Commons from 1728 to 1734.

East was the eldest son of William East, barrister, of the Manor House, Kennington, and his wife Elizabeth Gough, daughter of Jeremy Gough of London. He was admitted at King's College, Cambridge in the Lent term of 1714 and at Middle Temple on 23 February 1714. East's family was connected with the wine trade, and he was appointed Commissioner for wine licences in 1719. He married Anne Cooke, daughter of Sir George Cooke of Harefield, Middlesex, chief prothonotary of court of common pleas, on 30 April 1724. He succeeded his father in 1726,

In 1727 he wished to stand for Parliament but he was unable to keep his post as Commissioner while being an MP. He resigned his post which went to his son, Gilbert East, and expected to stand for Marlborough. However the plan fell through, and he was returned instead as Member of Parliament for St Mawes at a by-election on 2 March 1728 on the interest of John Knight. He voted with the Administration on the army in 1732 and on the repeal of the Septennial Act in 1734. He did not stand at the 1734 British general election.

East died on 7 November 1737, leaving a son and two daughters.

Parliament of Great Britain
Preceded by Henry Vane; John Knight	Member of Parliament for St Mawes; 1728–1734; With: Henry Vane	Succeeded by Henry Vane; Richard Plumer
