= Charles Hickman (bishop) =

Anglican Bishop of Derry (1648–1713)

- Bishop of Derry
- Church: Church of Ireland
- See: Diocese of Derry
- In office: 1703–1713
- Predecessor: William King

Personal details
- Born: 1648 ?
- Died: 1713 (aged 64–65)

Charles Hickman (1648 – 18 November 1713), an Anglican divine in the Church of Ireland, was Bishop of Derry from 1703 to 1713.

He was born in Northamptonshire, was a King's Scholar at Westminster School and entered Christ Church, Oxford in 1667. He graduated B.A. in 1671, M.A. in 1674, B.D. in 1684 and D.D. in 1685.

He was appointed Rector of St. Ebbs, Oxford, Chaplain to the Duke of Southampton and Lord Chandos (1680), Domestic Chaplain to the Earl of Rochester in 1684 and Chaplain in ordinary to William III in 1690. He was lecturer at St. James', Westminster in 1692, Chaplain to Queen Anne and Rector of Farnham Royal, Buckinghamshire, 1698–1703. With the patronage of Lawrence Hyde, 1st Earl of Rochester, Lord Lieutenant of Ireland in 1700- 1703, Hickman was elevated to the episcopy as Bishop of Derry on 11 June 1703, a position he held to his death.

He died in 1713. He had married Anne Burgoyne in April 1703, with whom he had one daughter. He died in London on 28 November 1713 and was buried in Westminster Abbey.

Religious titles
Preceded by William King	Bishop of Derry; 1703–1713	Succeeded by John Hartstonge
