= Michael Harvey (died 1748) =

Michael Harvey (10 May 1694 – 3 October 1748), of Coombe, Surrey. and Clifton Maybank, near Milborne Port, Dorset was a British landowner and Tory politician who sat in the House of Commons between 1717 and 1747.

Harvey was the only surviving son of Edward Harvey of Coombe and his first wife He married after a settlement dated 23 April 1715, Rebecca Wolstenholme, daughter of Sir John Wolstenholme, 3rd Baronet, MP, of Edmonton, Middlesex. He inherited the Clifton Maybank estates from the widow of his cousin, Michael Harvey MP, in 1717.

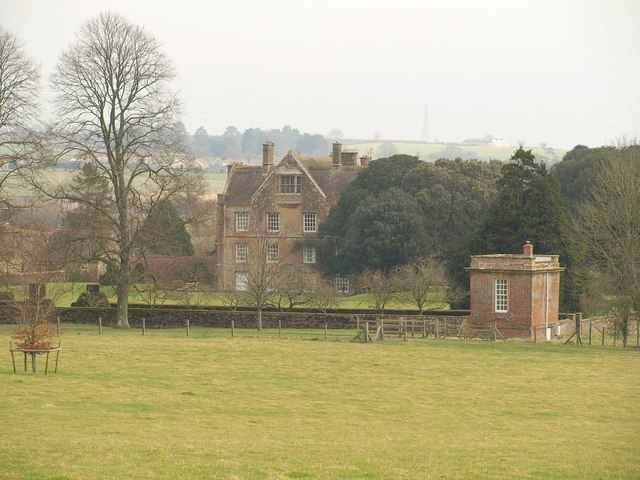
Clifton Maybank House

Harvey, was initially declared elected as Tory Member of Parliament for Milborne Port at a by-election of 10 June 1717, but after considering a petition alleging gross bribery the House of Commons overturned the result and on 6 July 1717 his opponent was declared elected instead. He was returned unopposed at the 1722 general election but faced contests in subsequent elections which he won in 1727 and 1734 but was defeated in the 1741 general election. He was returned for Milborne Port again at a by election on 2 February 1742.

Although Harvey succeeded to his father’s estate in 1736, he was financially ruined by the successive contests at Milborne Port. In 1743 a private Act was passed which vested his Leicestershire estates in trustees in order to discharge encumbrances on the estates in Surrey. He also had to mortgage his Clifton Maybank estate and property at Milborne Port, putting them into the hands of Peter Walter who was notorious for his property dealings. At the 1747 general election, Harvey was involved in a double return at Milborne Port and his opponents were declared elected. The validity of the election was referred by the House to the elections committee. By 1748, Peter Walter had foreclosed on his Clifton Maybank and Milborne Port properties.

Harvey died of apoplexy on 3 October 1748, before the elections committee reported on the last election. He had no children and his Surrey estates were sold.

Parliament of Great Britain
Preceded by John Cox; James Medlycott	Member of Parliament for Milborne Port; 1717; With: James Medlycott	Succeeded by Charles Stanhope; James Medlycott
Preceded by Charles Stanhope; James Medlycott	Member of Parliament for Milborne Port; 1722–1741; With: George Speke 1722-1727; Thomas Medlycott 1727-1734; Thomas Medlycott, junior 1734-1741	Succeeded by Jeffrey French; Thomas Medlycott, junior
Preceded by Jeffrey French; Thomas Medlycott, junior	Member of Parliament for Milborne Port; 1742–1747; With: Jeffrey French	Succeeded by Jeffrey French; Thomas Medlycott, junior
