= Michael Malet =

English lawyer and politician

Michael Malet (c 1632 - after 1683) was an English lawyer and politician who sat in the House of Commons from 1660 to 1679. He was a zealous Protestant and opponent of the court and appears to have lost his reason.

Malet was the son of Sir Thomas Malet of Poyntington. He was a student of Middle Temple in 1650 and was called to the bar in 1655. He became a member of the Rota Club in 1659. In 1660, he was elected Member of Parliament for Milborne Port in the Convention Parliament. He was a J.P. for Somerset from July 1660 to 1670 and a commissioner for maimed soldiers from December 1660 to 1661. In 1661 he was re-elected MP for Milbourne Port in the Cavalier Parliament. He was commissioner for assessment for Somerset from 1661 to 1669 and for Berkshire from 1664 to 1667. In 1675 he became a bencher of Middle Temple. He was commissioner for assessment for Westminster from 1677 to 1679.

Malet was an extreme Protestant opposed to the High Church as well as Roman Catholics. He was also an outspoken enemy of the Court and apparently became increasingly insane. It was said of him when Samuel Pepys introduced the naval programme "Michael Malet, who, to make good the M’s in his name, is many times mightily mad, without a metaphor or a trope, said he knew no need we had of ships in time of peace, unless it were to carry away the Italian women again, meaning the duchess of York." Later it was reported that he "came to the Queen’s drawing room to show he can be as mad elsewhere as in the Parliament House, and there bawled out aloud to his royal highness, quite across the circle when the room was full, ‘Monsieur le Duc, il faut laisser l’idolatrie, il faut faire Dieu votre ami; il vous servira mieux que le roi de France, ce que je maintiendrai’; which he was so pleased with that he said it over twice; and afterwards, being persuaded out of the Queen's presence, uttered twenty other follies in the privy chamber". His final disgrace came at a by-election in Berkshire in July 1678 when "poor, maggot-headed Mr Malet" uttered some words ... which were said to "reflect very greatly upon his Majesty’s honour" and he was sent to the Tower. He was never brought to trial and was last recorded alive in 1683.

Malet married Mary Aldworth, widow of John Aldworth of Letcombe Regis, Berkshire and daughter of Thomas White of Fyfield Berkshire by 1664. They had at least three sons. He was the brother of John Malet.

Parliament of England
Preceded by Not represented in Restored Rump	Member of Parliament for Milborne Port; 1660; With: William Milborne; Francis Wyndham; John Hunt	Succeeded by John Hunt; William Lacy
