= William King (bishop) =

Irish religious leader

The Right Reverend and Right Honourable William King PC (Ire), D.D.
- Archbishop of Dublin; Bishop of Glendalough; Primate of Ireland
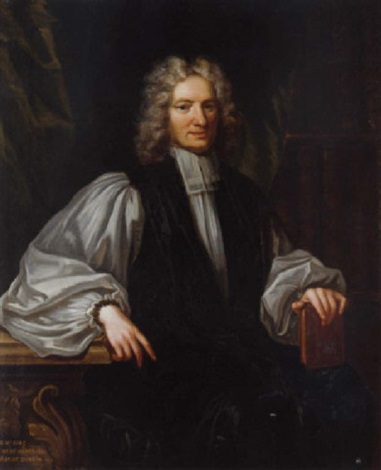
- Church: Church of Ireland
- See: Dublin
- Appointed: 11 March 1703
- In office: 1703-1729
- Predecessor: Narcissus Marsh
- Successor: John Hoadly
- Previous post: Bishop of Derry (1691-1703)

Orders
- Ordination: 12 April 1674 by John Parker
- Consecration: 25 January 1691 by Francis Marsh

Personal details
- Born: 1 May 1650 Antrim, County Antrim, Kingdom of Ireland
- Died: 8 May 1729 (aged 79) Dublin, Kingdom of Ireland
- Buried: St Mary's Church, Donnybrook
- Denomination: Anglican

William King (1 May 1650 – 8 May 1729) was an Anglican divine in the Church of Ireland, who was Archbishop of Dublin from 1703 to 1729. He was an author and supported the Glorious Revolution. He had considerable political influence in Ireland, including an effective veto on judicial appointments.

== Early life ==
King was born in May 1650 in County Antrim, to James King and his wife; his parents were recent immigrants from Aberdeen. He was educated at The Royal School, Dungannon, County Tyrone, and thereafter at Trinity College Dublin, graduating BA on 23 February 1670 and MA in 1673.

== Career ==
On 25 October 1671, King was ordained a deacon as chaplain to John Parker, Archbishop of Tuam, and on 14 July 1673 Parker gave him the prebend of Kilmainmore, County Mayo. King, who lived as part of Parker's household, was ordained a priest on 12 April 1674.

His support of the Glorious Revolution in 1688 served to advance his position. He became Bishop of Derry in 1691. He was advanced to the position of Archbishop of Dublin in 1703, a post he would hold until his death. He gave £1,000 for the founding of "Archbishop King's Professorship of Divinity" at Trinity College in 1718. Much of his correspondence survives and provides a historic resource for the study of the Ireland of his time. He died in May 1729 in St. Sepulchre's Palace, Dublin.

King's years as a bishop were marked by reform and the building of churches and glebe houses, and by the dispensing of charity. He was generally regarded as a man of sense and good judgment, and his political influence was considerable: he was always consulted on judicial appointments and at times seems to have had an effective veto over candidates he considered unsuitable. His influence declined after the appointment of Hugh Boulter as Archbishop of Armagh in 1724, as Boulter was also consulted on judicial appointments, and the two could rarely agree on a suitable candidate.

Boulter's preferment to the See of Armagh, passing over his own more obvious claims, was a bitter disappointment to King. He took petty revenge at their first meeting by refusing to get up from his chair, saying that he was too old to stand; he might reasonably have pointed out instead that he was a martyr to gout, from which he had suffered for forty years and from which he died five years later. He was a vocal opponent of Wood's halfpence during the 1720s.

After King's death, Bishop Theophilus Bolton purchased 6,000 of King's books to establish the Bolton Library in Cashel, County Tipperary.

== Philosophical works ==
As a philosopher and a man of letters, he wrote The State of the Protestants in Ireland under King James's Government in 1691 and De Origine Mali in 1702. The latter book was translated into English with extensive notes by Edmund Law in 1731 as An Essay on the Origin of Evil. It was also subject to discussion by Pierre Bayle as well as an influential critical discussion by Gottfried Wilhelm Leibniz, published as an appendix to Leibniz's Théodicée.

De Origine Mali contains a provocative and original philosophical account of free will that has recently started to attract philosophers' attention. In the context of the debate on free will, King argues that human beings, like God, are endowed with a distinctive faculty of free choice (electio in Latin). This faculty, criticized by Leibniz as an unfounded magical power ("puissance magique"), can, for King, generate value in the world. Recently, scholars have been debating the details of the process that leads to the generation of value through choice in King's philosophy. While some argue that there is a lacuna in King's explanation between election and action, others claim that King gives an account of how desires can provide such a connection.

Church of Ireland titles
Preceded by Ezekiel Hopkins	Bishop of Derry; 1691–1703	Succeeded by Charles Hickman
Preceded by Narcissus Marsh	Archbishop of Dublin; 1703–1729	Succeeded by John Hoadly
