= Stephen Slaughter =

English painter (1697–1765)

Stephen Slaughter (baptised 1697, died 1765) was an English portrait painter. He spent periods of his career in Dublin, where he introduced the English style of portrait painting.

== Life ==
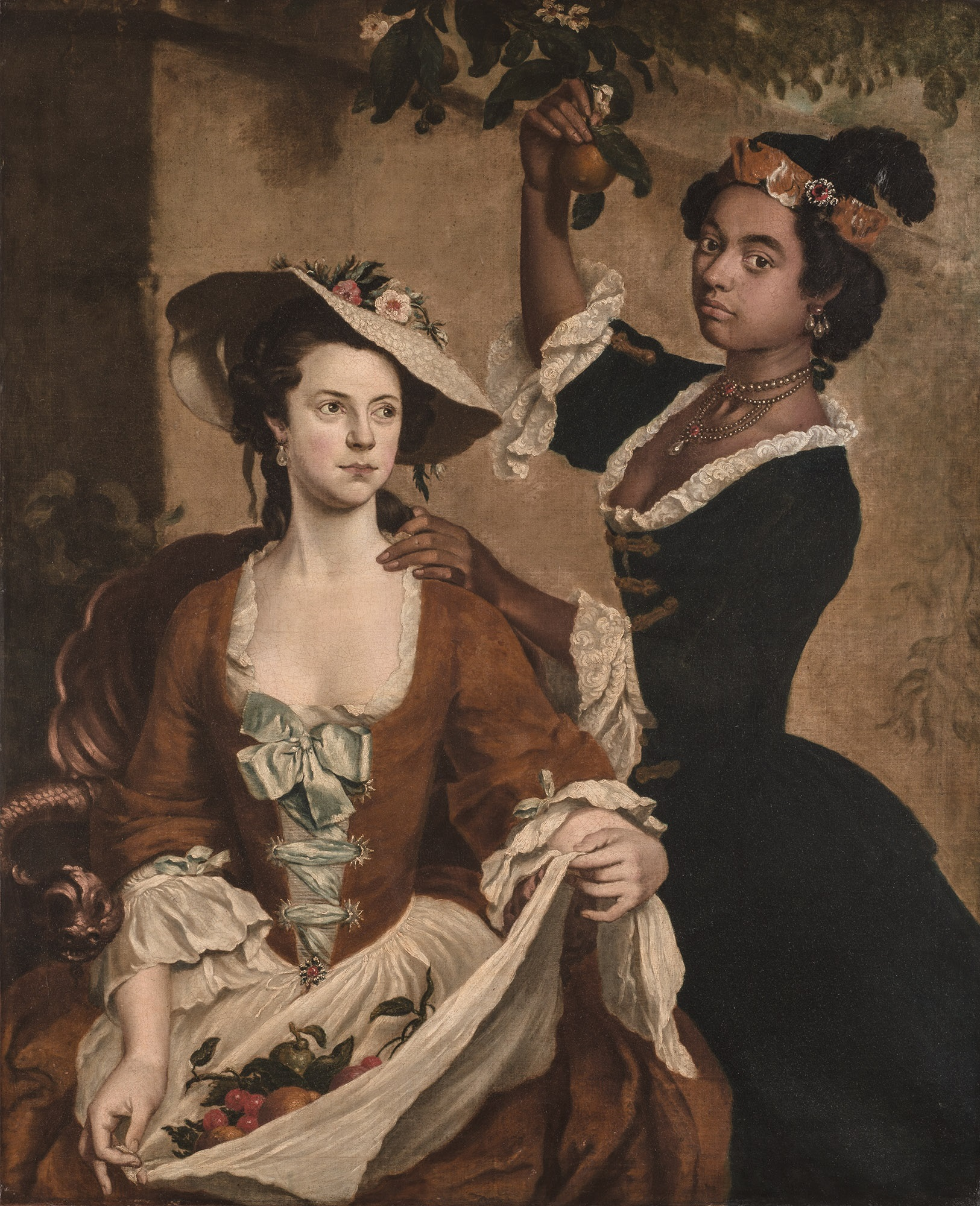
Portrait of Two Women Gathering Fruit (c. 1750)

He was the son of Stephen and Judith Slaughter, was baptised in London, and had the artist Judith Lewis as a sister. It has been claimed that John Lewis (fl. 1737–1769), also an artist, was Slaughter's brother-in-law; but it is disputed whether Lewis was the husband of Judith Slaughter. Slaughter studied under Godfrey Kneller from 1712. In 1720, on the account of Joseph Highmore, he was at the London academy of Louis Cheron and John Vanderbank.

There followed a long period abroad, in France and Flanders. Returning in 1732–1733 to London, Slaughter then set up in Dublin during 1734, paying a longer visit in the 1740s. Slaughter influenced in particular Thomas Frye, as did James Latham.

In 1745, Slaughter became Surveyor of the King's Pictures, in succession to Peter Walton. From 1748 he spent time on picture restoration. On 14 July 1765, two months after his death, he was elected to the Accademia del Disegno, with William Oram.

== Portraits ==
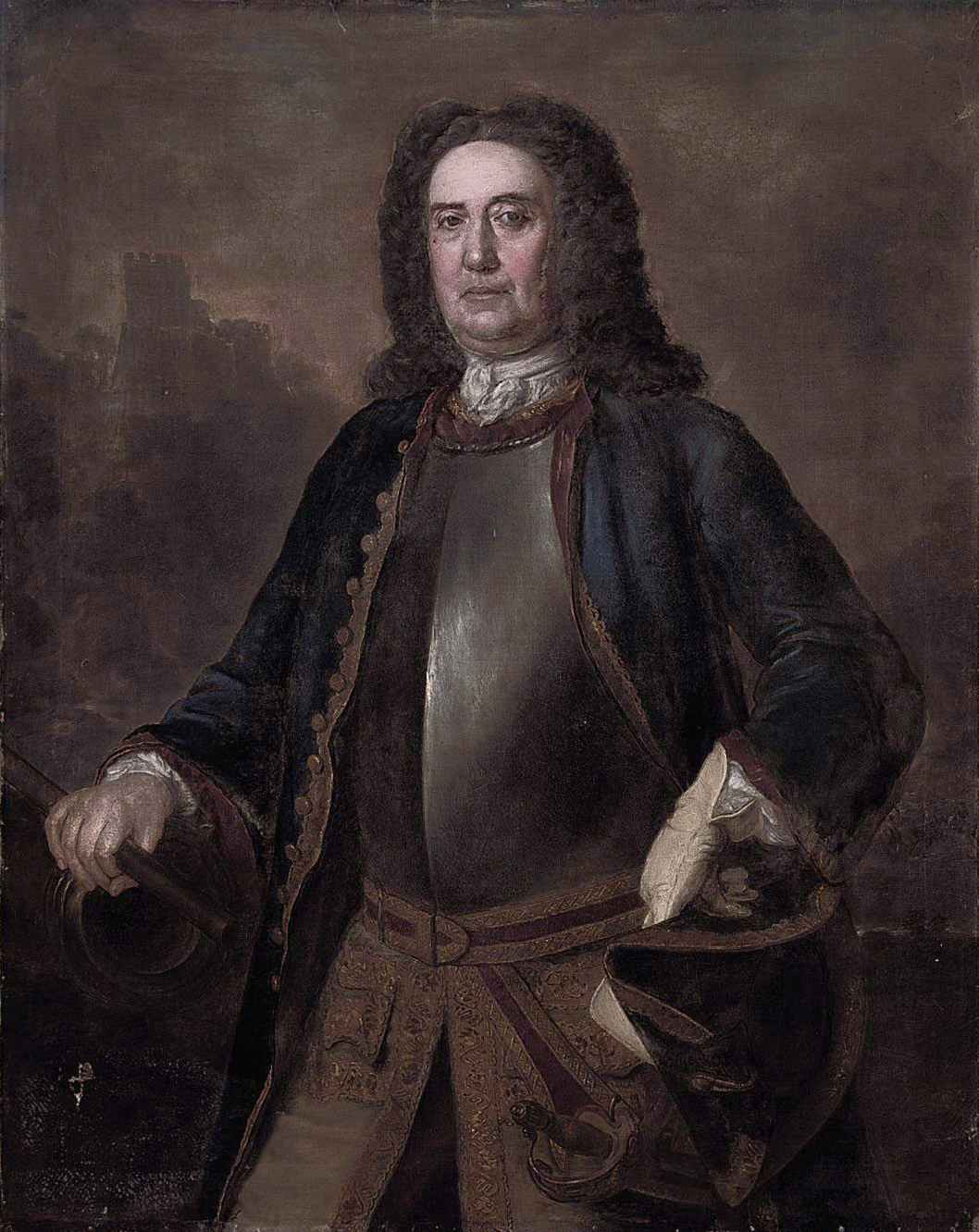
Portrait of Major General Richard St George, 1744, by Stephen Slaughter

- 1736 Sir Hans Sloane
- 1737 Hon. John Spencer
- 1737 Lady Georgiana Spencer, wife of the Hon. John Spencer
- 1742 Sir Robert Walpole
- 1744 William Stewart, 1st Earl of Blessington
- 1744 Major General Richard St George
- 1744 Henry Boyle, 1st Earl of Shannon
- 1744 John Hoadly
- 1753 Sir George Lee
- Nathaniel Kane
