= William Milborne =

Member of the Parliament of England

William Milborne (c 1633 – 12 July 1660) was an English landowner and politician who sat in the House of Commons in 1660.

Milborne was the son of John Milborne (died 1661) of Wonastow, Monmouthshire and his first wife Katherine Dennis, daughter of John Dennis of Pucklechurch, Gloucestershire. His father was neutral during the Civil War, although parliamentary forces used his house as a garrison in 1644. In 1654, his father conveyed to him the bulk of the estate, worth £1,200 p.a. including the manor of Milborne Port while Milborne was on bad terms with his stepmother and her family. Milborne entered Middle Temple in 1658 in the chambers of his uncle Henry Milborne. He was commissioner for assessment for Monmouthshire in January 1660 and commissioner for militia in March 1660. In April 1660, he was elected Member of Parliament for Milborne Port for the Convention Parliament.

Milborne never married and died at the age of about 27 at his uncle's chambers at Middle Temple.

Milborne was the half-brother of Clayton Milborne.

Parliament of England
Preceded by Not represented in Restored Rump	Member of Parliament for Milborne Port; 1660; With: Michael Malet	Succeeded by Michael Malet; Francis Wyndham
