= Thomas Malet =

English judge and politician

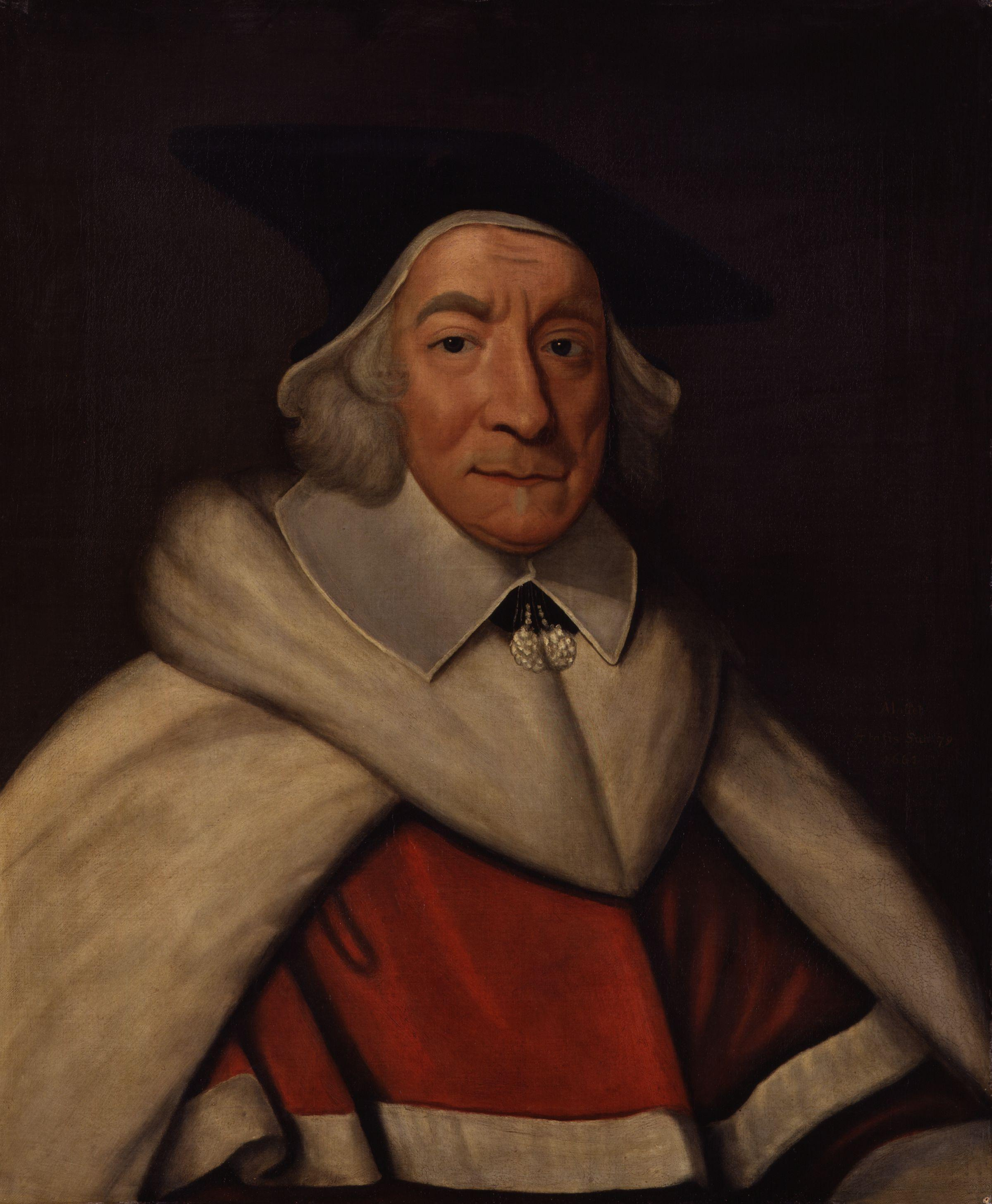
Portrait by unknown artist, 1661, in the National Portrait Gallery in London

Sir Thomas Malet (1582–1665) was an English judge and politician who sat in the House of Commons between 1614 and 1628. He was Solicitor general to Queen Henrietta Maria.

== Life ==
Malet was of Poyntington, Somerset and also inherited lands in Somerset known as St Audries. He was trained in the law at the Middle Temple and called to the bar in 1606.

In 1614 he was elected Member of Parliament for Tregony in the Addled Parliament and re-elected for Tregony in 1621. He was returned for Newtown, IoW in 1625 and 1626.

He became judge of assize in 1641. In March 1642 he encouraged the Kentish grand jury to petition Parliament in favour of the Book of Common Prayer and against depriving the King of control of the militia. He was imprisoned in the Tower of London for two years until he was exchanged for Sir John Temple. He then joined the Royal Court at Oxford. He was disabled by Parliament on 24 November 1645 and ceased to act on the fall of Oxford in June 1646.

At the Restoration, he was restored in 1660 to his judgeship. He was discharged in 1663. He was granted a warrant for a baronetcy, but did not take it up.

Malet died at the age of 82, leaving the estate to his son John.

== Family ==
Malet married Jane Mylles, daughter of Francis Mylles. His sons John and Michael were MPs after the Restoration. His second son Baldwin was killed in the Civil War at the age of 20.

Parliament of England
Preceded by Henry Pomeroy; Richard Garveigh	Member of Parliament for Tregony; 1614–1622; With: William Hakewill	Succeeded by Peter Specott; Ambrose Manaton
