= Milborne Port (constituency) =

Former parliamentary constituency in the United Kingdom

- Former borough constituency for the House of Commons
- County: Somerset
- Major settlements: Milborne Port

1628–1832
- Seats: Two

Milborne Port is a former parliamentary borough located in Somerset. It elected two members to the unreformed House of Commons between 1298 and 1307 and again from 1628, but was disenfranchised in the Reform Act 1832 as a rotten borough.

== Members of Parliament ==
Milborne Port re-franchised in 1628

Year	First member	First party	Second member	Second party
1628	Philip Digby		Sir Nathaniel Napier	
No Parliament summoned 1629-1640

=== MPs 1640–1832 ===
Year	First member	First party	Second member	Second party
April 1640	Edward Kyrton	Royalist	Thomas Erle	
November 1640	Edward Kyrton	Royalist	Lord Digby	Royalist
1640 (?)	Edward Kyrton	Royalist	John Digby	Royalist
August 1642	Kyrton and Digby disabled from sitting – both seats vacant			
1645	William Carent		Thomas Grove	
December 1648	William Carent		Grove excluded in Pride's Purge – seat vacant	
1653	Milborne Port was unrepresented in the Barebones Parliament			
1654,1656	Milborne Port was unrepresented in the First and Second Protectorate Parliaments			
January 1659	William Carent		Robert Hunt	
May 1659	Not represented in the restored Rump			
April 1660	William Milborne		Michael Malet	
August 1660	Francis Wyndham		Michael Malet	
1677	John Hunt		Michael Malet	
February 1679	John Hunt		William Lacy	
August 1679	John Hunt		Henry Bull	
1689	John Hunt		Thomas Saunders	
1690	Sir Thomas Travell		Sir Charles Carteret	
January 1701	Sir Thomas Travell		Sir Richard Newman	
December 1701	Sir Thomas Travell		Henry Thynne	
1702	Sir Thomas Travell		John Hunt	
1705	Sir Thomas Travell		Thomas Medlycott	
1709	Sir Thomas Travell		Thomas Smith	
1710	Sir Thomas Travell		James Medlycott	
1715	John Cox		James Medlycott	
June 1717	Michael Harvey		James Medlycott	
July 1717	Charles Stanhope		James Medlycott	
1722	Michael Harvey		George Speke	
1727	Michael Harvey		Thomas Medlycott	
1734	Michael Harvey		Thomas Medlycott, junior	
1741	Jeffrey French		Thomas Medlycott, junior	
1742 by-election	Jeffrey French		Michael Harvey	
1747	Jeffrey French		Michael Harvey	
1748 by-election	Jeffrey French		Thomas Medlycott, junior	
1754	Edward Walter		Thomas Medlycott, junior	
1763 by-election	Edward Walter		Thomas Hutchings-Medlycott	
1770 by-election	Edward Walter		Robert Knight, 1st Earl of Catherlough	
April 1772 by-election	Edward Walter		Richard Combe	
May 1772	Edward Walter		George Prescott	
1774	Hon. Temple Luttrell		Captain Charles Wolseley	
1780	John Townson		Thomas Hutchings-Medlycott	
1781 by-election	John Townson		John Pennington	
1787 by-election	William Popham		John Pennington	
1790	William Medlycott		John Pennington	
1791 by-election	Richard Johnson		John Pennington	
1794 by-election	Colonel Mark Wood		John Pennington	
1796	Lord Paget		Sir Robert Ainslie	
1802	Lord Paget		Hugh Leycester	
1804 by-election	Captain Charles Paget		Hugh Leycester	
1806	Lord Paget		Hugh Leycester	
January 1810 by-election	Viscount Lewisham		Hugh Leycester	
December 1810	Hon. Sir Edward Paget	Tory	Hugh Leycester	
1812	Hon. Sir Edward Paget	Tory	Robert Matthew Casberd	Tory
1820	Hon. Berkeley Paget	Tory	Thomas Graves	Tory
1826	Arthur Chichester	Whig	Thomas Graves	Tory
1827 by-election	Arthur Chichester	Whig	John Henry North	Tory
1830	George Byng	Whig	William Sturges-Bourne	Tory
4 March 1831 by-election	Richard Lalor Sheil	Whig	William Sturges-Bourne	Tory
14 March 1831 by-election	Richard Lalor Sheil	Whig	Captain George Byng	Whig
July 1831 by-election	Philip Cecil Crampton	Whig	Captain George Byng	Whig
1832	Constituency abolished			

== See also ==
- Milborne Port
