= George Stone (bishop) =

English bishop

The Most Reverend and Right Honourable George Stone PC (Ire)
- Archbishop of Armagh; Primate of All Ireland
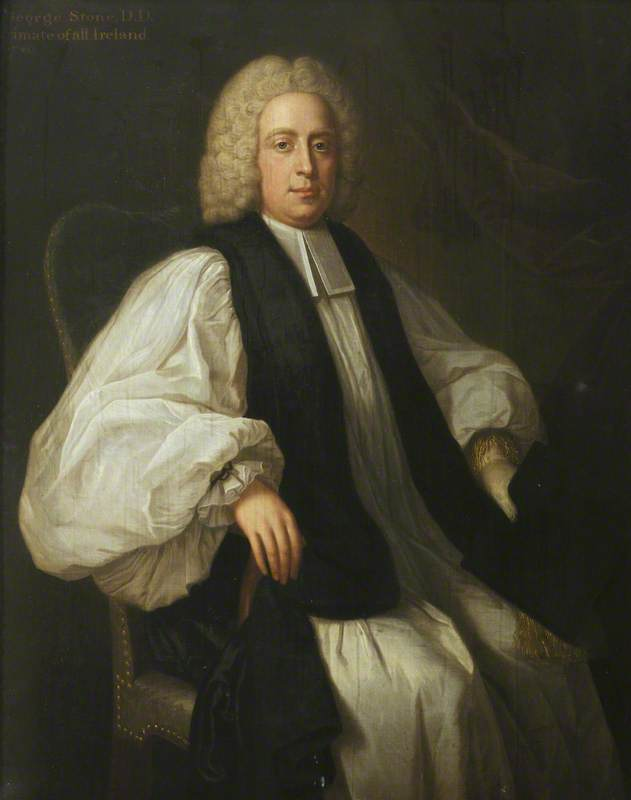
- Portrait by Allan Ramsay
- Church: Church of Ireland
- See: Armagh
- Appointed: 13 March 1747
- In office: 1747-1764
- Predecessor: John Hoadly
- Successor: Richard Robinson
- Previous posts: Dean of Ferns (1733–1734); Dean of Derry (1734–1740); Bishop of Ferns and Leighlin (1740–1743); Bishop of Kildare (1743–1745); Bishop of Derry (1745–1747)

Orders
- Consecration: 3 August 1740 by John Hoadly

Personal details
- Born: 7 January 1708 London, England
- Died: 19 December 1764 (aged 56) London, England
- Buried: Westminster Abbey
- Denomination: Anglican
- Parents: Andrew Stone & Anne Holbrooke
- Education: Westminster School
- Alma mater: Christ Church, Oxford

George Stone (1708 – 19 December 1764) was the Church of Ireland Archbishop of Armagh (Primate of All Ireland) from 1747 until his death.

== Advancement ==
Born in London, the son of Andrew Stone, a London goldsmith. He was educated at Westminster School and Christ Church, Oxford. Having taken holy orders, his advancement in the Church was very rapid, mainly through the influence of his older brother Andrew Stone. Andrew's connections with George II made him able to promote the preferment of his brother George, who went to Ireland as chaplain to Lionel Sackville, 1st Duke of Dorset when that nobleman became Lord Lieutenant of Ireland in 1731.

In 1733 Stone was made Dean of Ferns, and in the following year he exchanged this deanery for that of Derry. In 1740 he became Bishop of Ferns and Leighlin, in 1743 Bishop of Kildare, in 1745 Bishop of Derry, and in 1747 Archbishop of Armagh. During the two years that he occupied the See of Kildare he was also Dean of Christ Church, Dublin.

== Primate of All Ireland ==
From the moment that he became Primate of All Ireland, Stone proved himself more a politician than an ecclesiastic. "He was said to have been selfish, worldly-minded, ambitious and ostentatious; and he was accused, though very probably falsely, of gross private vice." His aim was to secure political power, a desire which brought him into conflict with Henry Boyle, the Speaker of the Irish House of Commons, who had organized a formidable opposition to the government. The Duke of Dorset's reappointment to the Lord Lieutenancy in 1751, with his son Lord George Sackville as Chief Secretary for Ireland, strengthened the primate's position and enabled him to triumph over the popular party on the constitutional question as to the right of the Irish House of Commons to dispose of surplus Irish revenue, which the government maintained was the property of the Crown.

When Dorset was replaced by the Duke of Devonshire in 1755, Boyle was raised to the peerage as Earl of Shannon and received a pension, and other members of the opposition also obtained pensions or places; and the archbishop, finding himself excluded from power, went into opposition to the government in alliance with John Ponsonby. These two, afterwards joined by the primate's old rival Lord Shannon, and usually supported by the Earl of Kildare, regained control of affairs in 1758, during the viceroyalty of the Duke of Bedford. In the same year, Stone wrote a remarkable letter, preserved in the Bedford Correspondence (ii. 357), in which he speaks very despondingly of the material condition of Ireland and the distress of the people. The archbishop was one of the "undertakers" who controlled the Irish House of Commons, and although he did not regain the almost dictatorial power he had exercised at an earlier period, which had suggested a comparison between him and Cardinal Wolsey, he continued to enjoy a prominent share in the administration of Ireland until his death, which occurred in London on 19 December 1764. According to Horace Walpole, his death was due to ruining his constitution by an excess of food and alcohol.

== Historical observations ==
Although this "much-abused prelate," as Lecky calls him, was a firm supporter of the English government in Ireland, he was far from being a man of tyrannical or intolerant disposition. It was due to his influence that in the anti-tithe disturbances in Ulster in 1763 the government acted with conspicuous moderation, and that the movement was suppressed with very little bloodshed. He constantly favoured a policy of conciliation towards the Roman Catholics, whose loyalty he defended at different periods of his career both in his speeches in the Irish House of Lords and in his correspondence with ministers in London. Philip Stanhope, 4th Earl of Chesterfield told him that he was the only man with the political skills to rule Ireland, but in a dig at his irregular private life, said that it would help if he became a clergyman.

Archbishop Stone, who never married, was a man of remarkably handsome appearance; and his manners were "eminently seductive and insinuating". Richard Cumberland, who was struck by the "Polish magnificence" of the primate, speaks in the highest terms of his courage, tact, and qualities as a popular leader. Horace Walpole, who gives a generally unfavourable picture of his private character, acknowledges that Stone possessed "abilities seldom to be matched", and gives him credit for charity, generosity and an absence of malice; and he had the distinction of being mentioned by David Hume as one of the only two men of mark who had perceived merit in that author's History of England on its first appearance. He was himself the author of several volumes of sermons which were published during his lifetime.

== Notes ==
Religious titles
Preceded by John Hoadly	Archbishop of Armagh; 1747–1764	Succeeded by Richard Robinson
