= Eaton Stannard =

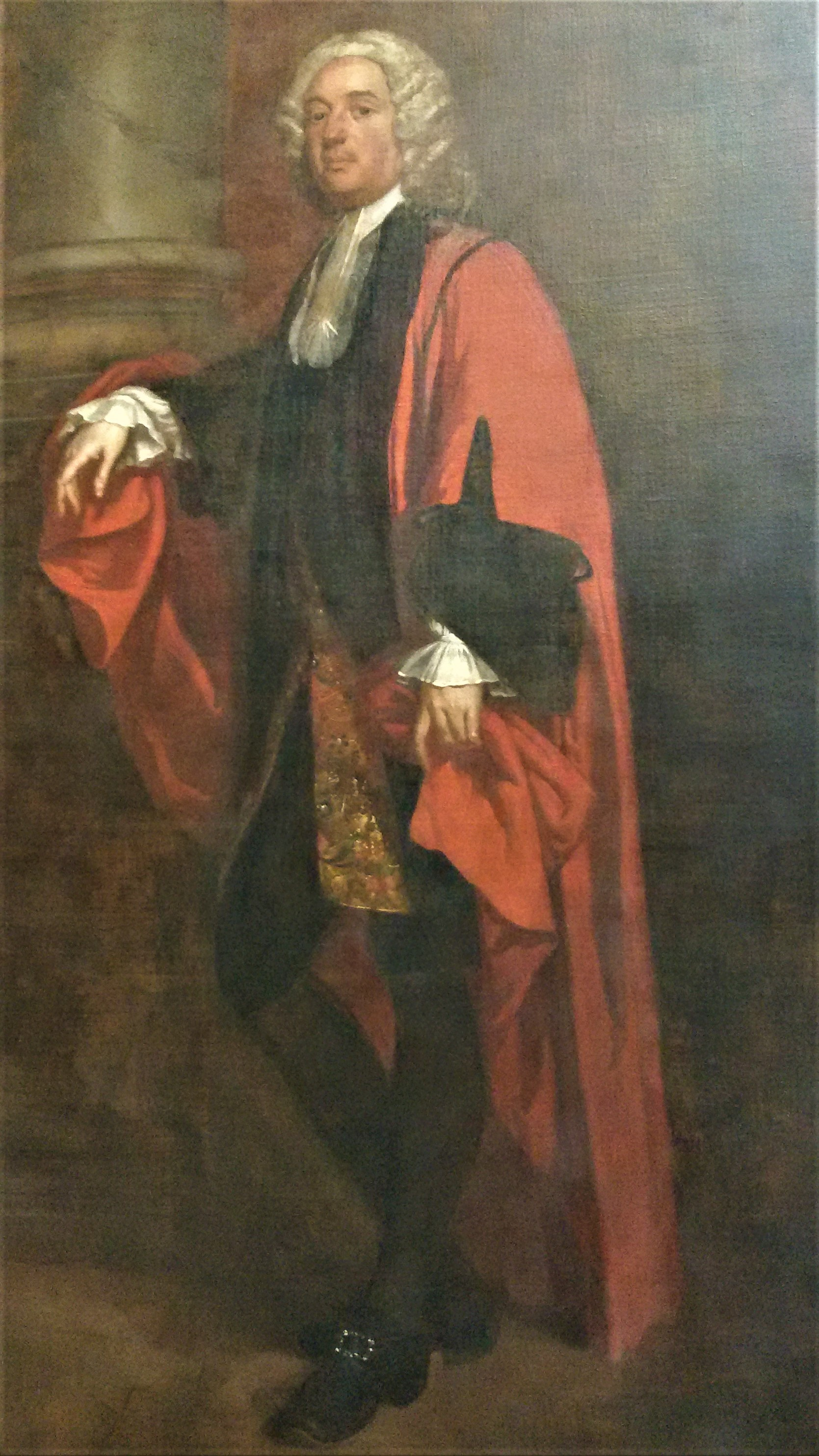
Eaton Stannard

Eaton Stannard (1685–1755) was a leading politician and lawyer in 18th-century Ireland. He was a popular Recorder of Dublin, a very unpopular serjeant-at-law (Ireland), and an experienced parliamentarian who represented Midleton in the Irish House of Commons for many years. He is mainly remembered now as a close friend of Jonathan Swift, whose last known letter was written to him.

== Family ==
He was born in County Cork, son of George Stannard of Ballyhealy, and his wife and cousin Martha Aldworth, daughter of Boyd Aldworth MP. George was the grandson of Captain Robert Stannard of Kilmallock (died 1655). Robert married Martha Travers, daughter of Sir Robert Travers, Judge of the Irish Court of Admiralty and MP for Clonakilty and his second wife Elizabeth Boyle, a cousin of the Earl of Cork. The Stannards and Travers families were part of a wide-reaching network of interrelated landowning families: Eaton himself married one of his Travers cousins, Elizabeth, a great-granddaughter of Sir Robert Travers, while his mother Martha Aldworth was yet another Travers descendant.

== Career ==
He entered Trinity College Dublin in 1702, and the Middle Temple in 1710. He was called to the Bar in 1714, and became King's Counsel and a Bencher of the King's Inns in 1726. The following year he entered Parliament as member for Midleton, which he represented until his death. He was an energetic and conscientious MP, though he was apparently not much of an orator; one historian called him a "long-winded bore". On the other hand, he was a fine barrister, and gave a particularly effective performance in the celebrated Annesley peerage case of 1745, which inspired the novel Kidnapped by Robert Louis Stevenson.

He was elected Recorder of Cork in 1728, but decided not to take up the appointment, for reasons which are not clear. He accepted the Recordership of Dublin in 1733 and held that office until 1750. Though he acted as a judge of assize in 1741, he never became a High Court judge; some attributed his failure to the enmity of Hugh Boulter, the influential Archbishop of Armagh, who had a habit of meddling in judicial appointments.

=== Friendship with Jonathan Swift ===
Stannard enjoyed the friendship of Jonathan Swift, who held him in high regard. He was one of the executors of Swift's will. In 1734, Swift, who by his own admission took little interest in politics in general, wrote to Stannard asking him to canvass for a Mr Gorges, who was standing for Parliament, simply because Gorges was a brother of Swift's beloved friend Lucy, Lady Howth "whose commands I dare not disobey". Swift's last known letter, dated 8 June 1741, was to Stannard, asking him to use his influence with his colleagues to advance the career of his young cousin William Swift, who had just started in practice at the Bar.

=== Serjeant-at-law ===
Stannard had been a popular Recorder of Dublin, but the decision to appoint him prime serjeant in 1754 in place of Anthony Malone proved highly unpopular. Malone, who had been dismissed for querying the Crown's right to appropriate revenue, was regarded by the government as effectively a member of the opposition, but he was held in high regard by the public, and despite Stannard's long experience of law and politics he was not Malone's equal as a lawyer. Even so, this hardly explains the level of popular fury against Stannard, who was burnt in effigy. In any event the controversy was short-lived: Stannard, who was approaching seventy, fell ill in the spring of 1755 and died at his house at St Stephen's Green, Dublin.

== Marriage and children ==
By his wife and distant cousin Elizabeth Travers, daughter of John Travers of Garycloyne Castle, near Blarney, he had several children, including John, his heir, George, and Catherine (died 1819). John had two daughters and co-heiresses:

- Cassandra, who married the Reverend Charles Eustace of Robertstown, County Kildare in 1801, and had five children;
- Alicia, who married George Powell of Newgarden, County Limerick, but had no issue.

As a result of Cassandra's marriage the Stannard lands at Ballydoyle, County Cork, passed into the Eustace family. George founded a longer-lasting branch of the Stannard family, who lived at The Priory, County Cork
