= Richard Jackson (Sudbury MP) =

English politician

Richard Jackson (1688–1768), of Crutched Friars, London, was a British merchant and politician who sat in the House of Commons briefly in 1734.

Jackson was a wealthy merchant trading with Italy. He married Elizabeth Clarke, daughter of Edward Clarke. In 1730, he was elected a director of the South Sea Company in 1730 and remained a director till he became deputy governor in 1764.

Jackson stood for parliament at Sudbury on 6 May 1726, but was defeated in a contest. He stood again for Sudbury at the next by-election on 31 January 1734 as a Government supporter and this time was successfully returned as Member of Parliament. Three months later he was defeated at the 1734 British general election, and after raising a petition, he withdrew it. He did not stand for Parliament again,

Jackson died on 11 January 1768 leaving a son and two daughters. His only son was Richard Jackson, who was an MP and colonial agent for Connecticut. The Jacksons, father and son, are commemorated in a marble tomb at Weasenham All Saints.

Parliament of Great Britain
| Preceded by John Knight; Carteret Leathes | Member of Parliament for Sudbury; Jan 1734 – Apr 1734; With: Carteret Leathes | Succeeded by Richard Price; Edward Stephenson |
