= John Knight (died 1733) =

English politician

John Knight (c.1686–1733) of Gosfield Hall, Essex was a British landowner and Whig politician who sat in the House of Commons from 1710 to 1733.

== Early life ==
Knight was the only son of John Knight and his wife Elizabeth. He was admitted at Middle Temple in 1702 and matriculated at Wadham College, Oxford on 26 March 1703, aged 16. His first wife was Elizabeth Slaughter of Cheyne Court, Herefordshire. He succeeded his father in 1708, and came into a significant inheritance. In about 1710 he acquired many Cornish estates from John Tredenham, and was listed as owning over £500 of Bank of England stock.

== Career ==
The Tredenham property carried an interest for one seat at St Mawes, but at the 1710 British general election Knight was returned unopposed as Member of Parliament for St Germans. In 1711 he was included upon the list of ‘worthy patriots’ who had helped detect the mismanagements of the previous ministry, which implies Tory loyalties but his vote of in favour of the ‘No Peace without Spain’ motion on 7 December 1711 counters this. His only other significant action in this Parliament was his vote on 18 June against the French commerce bill. He was returned unopposed again at the 1713 British general election. On 18 March 1714, he voted against the expulsion of Richard Steele, and was classed as a Whig.

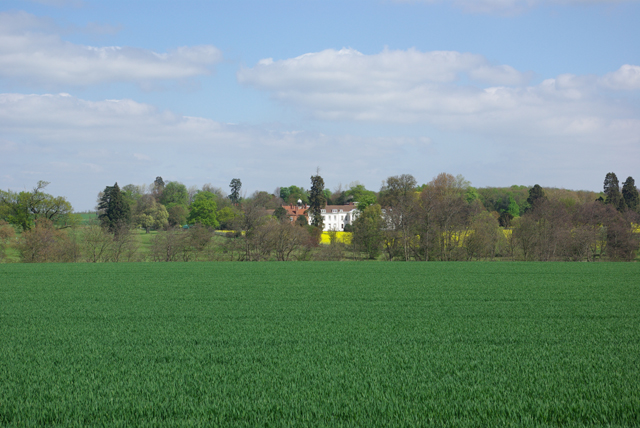
Gosfield Hall.

Knight bought Gosfield Hall in 1715 and at the 1715 British general election he was returned unopposed as an Administration candidate for St. Germans and continued voting with the Government. He was an Assistant of the Royal African Company from 1716 to 1722 and was secretary for the. Leeward Islands from 1718 to 1722. At the 1722 British general election he was returned unopposed as MP for Sudbury . At the 1727 British general election he was returned for Sudbury and was also returned St. Mawes, choosing to represent Sudbury. He then voted against the Government on the civil list arrears in 1729, for them on the Hessians in 1730, against them on the army in 1732, but for them on the Excise Bill in 1733. He also seconded the Address on 16 January 1733.

== Later life and legacy ==
Knight married, Anne Newsham, widow of John Newsham, MP, and daughter of James Craggs, as his second wife on 13 March 1724. She was a friend of Alexander Pope with whom she and her husband maintained a correspondence.

Knight died on 2 October 1733 leaving one surviving daughter by his second wife. His estates were inherited by his widow, who erected a monument by John Michael Rysbrack with an inscription by Pope to his memory in Gosfield church. After she remarried to Robert Nugent, she ‘ordered it to be enclosed ... with a wainscot screen to shut it off from her sight when she went to church, which, however, she seldom did’.

Parliament of Great Britain
Preceded by Edward Eliot; Francis Scobell	Member of Parliament for St Germans; 1710–1722; With: Edward Eliot 1710-1715; Waller Bacon 1715; Lord Stanhope 1715-1722	Succeeded by Lord Binning; Philip Cavendish
Preceded by Sir Hervey Elwes; Thomas Western	Member of Parliament for Sudbury; 1722–1733; With: Colonel William Windham 1722-1727; Carteret Leathes 1727-1733	Succeeded by Richard Jackson; Carteret Leathes
Preceded by Sidney Godolphin; Samuel Molyneux	Member of Parliament for St Mawes; 1727–1728; With: Henry Vane	Succeeded by Henry Vane; William East
