= Richard Bettesworth =

Irish politician

Richard Bettesworth (1689-1741) was an Irish politician, Law Officer and barrister of the early eighteenth century. He was a quarrelsome individual, and his list of enemies included Jonathan Swift, the publisher George Faulkner and Josiah Hort, Bishop of Kilmore and future Archbishop of Tuam.

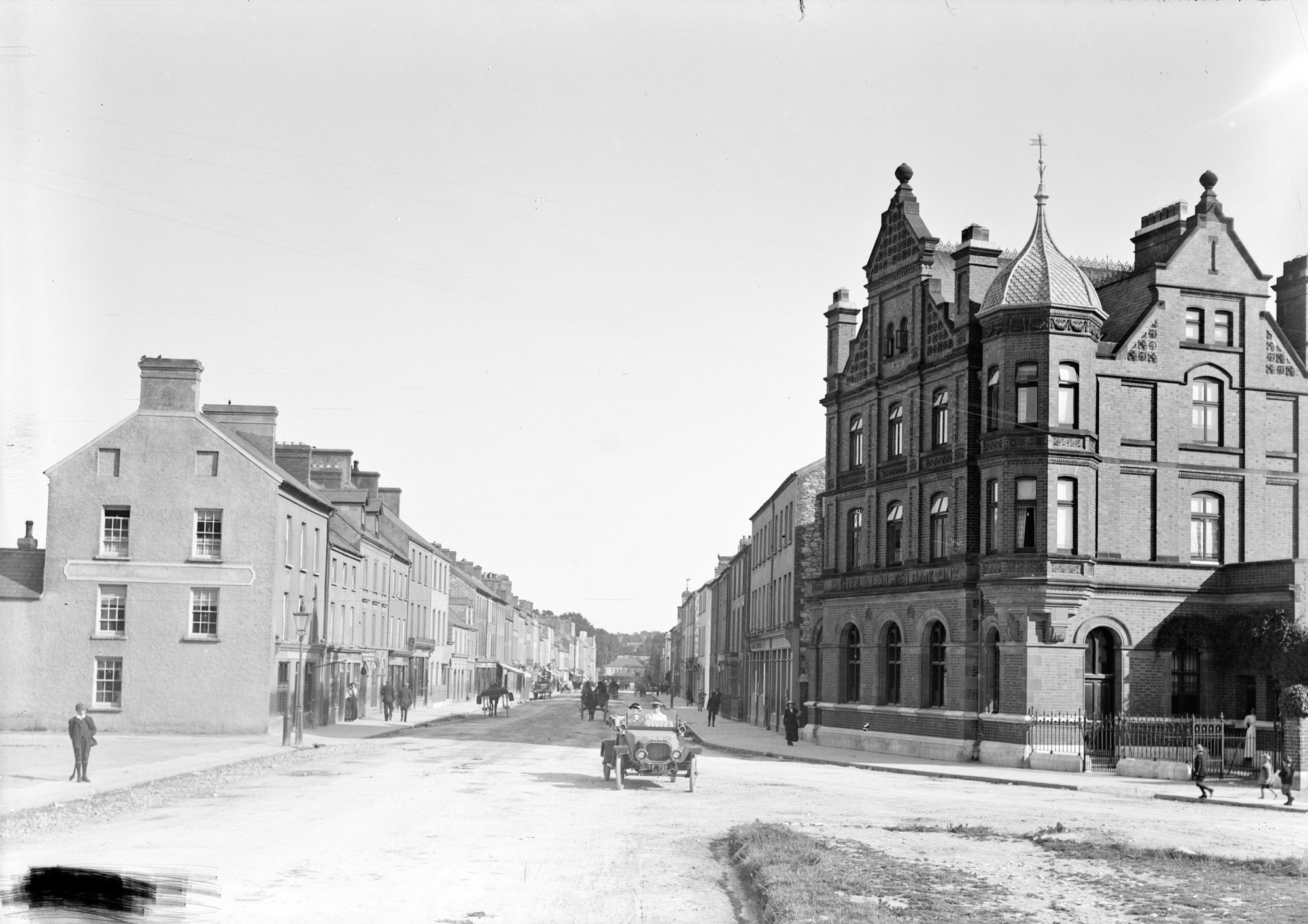
Midleton, County Cork, with which the Bettesworth family had a long-standing association

He was born in Midleton, County Cork in 1689 and educated at Trinity College, Dublin. He may have been a son or grandson of Thomas Bettesworth, who was appointed one of the original burgesses of the town of Midleton in 1672, shortly after it received its royal charter from King Charles II of England. Richard entered the Middle Temple in 1710, was called to the Irish Bar in 1716, and took silk in 1728. He entered the Irish House of Commons, sitting for Thomastown 1721-7 and for Midleton from 1727 to his death. He was appointed second Serjeant-at-law at the Irish Bar in 1732.

== Quarrel with Jonathan Swift ==
Bettesworth was the subject of numerous jeering satires by his enemies. Foremost among these was Jonathan Swift. From the early 1730s Bettesworth, who was a Nonconformist in religion, was strongly associated with the anti-clerical party in the Irish House of Commons, who supported moves which were likely to weaken the Church of Ireland, and in particular, pressed for the reduction of agricultural tithes. Swift, as a result, attacked Bettesworth in a vicious anonymous satire "The Booby Bettesworth". Swift attacked Bettesworth's apparent ignorance of the law, stating that he was one "who knows in law nor text, nor margent (margin)". Swift also commented on his inability to make any money from his legal practice, and ridiculed Bettesworth's way of pronouncing his name "Bett-es-worth", and his habit of referring to all his acquaintances as "brother", a common practice among Nonconformists at the time. He was particularly scathing about any comparison between Bettesworth and his "brother" (i.e. fellow Serjeant-at-law) Henry Singleton, whom Swift greatly admired. Bettesworth, infuriated, is said to have spent £1200 on trying to discover the author. He called on Swift at his home, demanded he admit his authorship, and according to Swift threatened him with "revenge". Swift said that Bettesworth, who had himself some claim to be a poet, threatened simply to use his pen, but some of Swift's friends claimed that Bettesworth threatened to stab him, or, according to Laetitia Pilkington, to cut his ears off, and his friends pledged to defend him against attack. Swift, undeterred, published a further satire on Bettesworth: "The Yahoo's Overthrow". His antipathy to Bettesworth and another old enemy, Richard Tighe, MP for Newtownards and member of the Privy Council of Ireland ("that puppy pair of Dicks" as Swift called them), did not lessen with the years.

== Quarrel with Bishop Hort ==
Josiah Hort, Bishop of Kilmore and Ardagh, a former enemy of Swift but now on friendly terms with him, also wrote a satire on Bettesworth, "A new proposal for the better regulation and improvement of quadrille". He proposed that all disputes about the popular card game quadrille be referred to Bettesworth for arbitration, but, since Bettesworth's judgment was not much regarded, Hort humorously suggested that there be a right of appeal to the "Upright Man", a wooden figure which hung in Essex Street in Dublin city centre, which, Hort remarked, could proudly boast that it had never given a corrupt judgment. It was printed by Swift's publisher George Faulkner. Faulkner was committed to prison for libel on an MP, but released after two days.

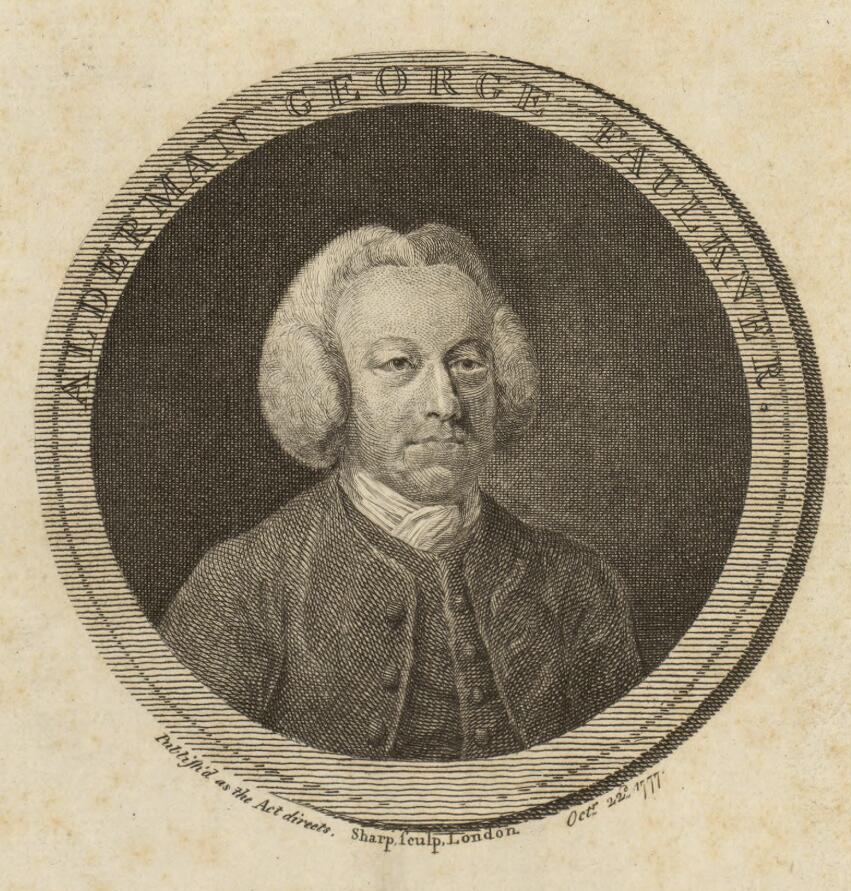
George Faulkner, the leading publisher, imprisoned for a libel on Bettesworth

== Death ==
In 1741 Bettesworth was sitting as an extra judge of assize (a task regularly performed by the Irish serjeants-at-law at the time) on the Munster Circuit, when he caught the infectious fever which was particularly rampant in that famine year, and died of it.
