= Kilner Brasier =

Irish politician

Kilner Brasier was an Irish politician.

He was the son of Paul Brasier and Sarah Beresford, daughter of Sir Tristram Beresford, 1st Baronet and his second wife Sarah Sackville. His father was a Royalist who fought for King Charles I of England during the English Civil War, and after the Restoration of Charles II received grants of land in County Londonderry and County Donegal.

Brasier was educated at Trinity College, Dublin. He was MP for Dundalk from 1695 to 1703; St Johnstown from 1703 to 1713; and Kilmallock from 1715 to 1725.

He married Anne Brooke, daughter of Sir Henry Brooke of Brookeborough and his second wife Anne St George and had an issue.
