= Midleton (Parliament of Ireland constituency) =

Pre-1801 Irish constituency

- Former borough constituency for the Irish House of Commons
- County: County Cork
- Borough: Midleton

1671–1801
- Replaced by: Disenfranchised

Midleton was a constituency represented in the Irish House of Commons until 1800. Incorporated by charter, 1671 whereby it was granted to Sir John Brodrick with a corporation sovereign, two bailiffs and 12 burgesses. It was disenfranchised at the Act of Union and compensation of £15,000 paid to Viscount Midleton.

== Borough ==
This constituency was based in the town of Midleton in County Cork.

== Members of Parliament ==
| Election | First MP | Second MP |
|---|---|---|
| 1689 Patriot Parliament | Dermod Long | John Long |
| 1692 | Thomas Brodrick | Hon. Henry Petty |
| August 1695 | Francis Brewster | St John Brodrick |
| 1695 | Francis Brewster | Charles Oliver |
| 1703 | St John Brodrick | Robert Foulke |
| 1707 | Henry Boyle | Robert Foulke |
| 1713 | Arthur Hyde | Jephson Busteed |
| 1715 | Thomas Brodrick | Edward Corker |
| 1727 | Richard Bettesworth | Eaton Stannard |
| 1741 | William Annesley | Eaton Stannard |
| 1755 | William Annesley | James Hamilton |
| 1758 | William Annesley | James St John Jeffereyes |
| 1759 | Francis Andrews | James St John Jeffereyes |
| 1761 | Thomas Brodrick | James St John Jeffereyes |
| 1768 | Edward Brodrick | James St John Jeffereyes |
| 1776 | Thomas Brodrick | Henry Brodrick |
| 1783 | Thomas Pigott | Arthur Dawson |
| 1794 | Benjamin Blake Woodward | Arthur Dawson |
| 1798 | Benjamin Blake Woodward | Richard Hardinge |
| 1799 | Benjamin Blake Woodward | John Francis Cradock |
| 1800 | Benjamin Blake Woodward | Hon. Richard Annesley |
| 1801 | Constituency disenfranchised | |

== Elections ==
- 1692
- 1695
- 1703
- 1707
- 1713
- 1715
- 1716
- 1727
- 1741 (by-election)
- 1775 (by-election)
- 1758
- 1759
- 1761
- 1768
- 1776
- 1781
- 1783
- 1790
- 1793
- 1797
- 1799
- 1800

== See also ==
- Midleton, a town in County Cork
- Irish House of Commons
- List of Irish constituencies
