= Samuel Hoadly =

Samuel Hoadly (1643–1705), was a schoolmaster and writer of educational books. His Natural Method of Teaching was the most popular school manual of its time, remaining in print for almost a century.

== Life ==
Hoadly was born 30 September 1643 at Guildford, New England, whither his parents had fled at the outbreak of the great rebellion. In 1655 his parents returned to Great Britain and settled in Edinburgh, where Samuel was educated, matriculating in 1659 in the university. In 1662 his parents removed to Rolvenden in Kent. Next year Samuel became an assistant-master in the Cranbrook free school. He was in holy orders, but never held any benefice. Hoadly established a private school at Westerham in 1671, whence in 1678 he removed to Tottenham High Cross. In 1686 he removed to Brook House, Hackney. He was appointed in 1700 head-master of Norwich School, an appointment which he held till his death on 17 April 1705. He was twice married; first in 1666 to Mary Wood, who died in childbirth in 1668; secondly, in 1669, to Martha, daughter of a priest called Pickering. By his second wife he had a large family of nine children, among whom were Benjamin Hoadly, Bishop of Winchester, and John Hoadly, Archbishop of Armagh.

Hoadly's Natural Method of Teaching, being the Accidence in Questions and Answers &c., a kind of English and Latin grammar combined (1683), was the most popular school manual of the age, and before 1773 reached its eleventh edition. In 1700 he published a school edition of Phædrus and the Maxims of Publilius Syrus. He had some correspondence with Grævius, in which occur notices of Bentley's projected edition of 'Hesychius' and of the controversy upon the Phalaris question. It was probably owing to the recommendation of Grævius that several young foreign scholars became boarders in Hoadly's house in order to learn English.

== Sources ==
This article incorporates text from a publication now in the public domain: "Hoadly, Samuel". Dictionary of National Biography. London: Smith, Elder & Co. 1885–1900.
