= Hugh Boulter =

Anglican bishop (1672–1742)

The Most Reverend and Right Honourable Hugh Boulter PC (Ire)
- Archbishop of Armagh; Primate of All Ireland
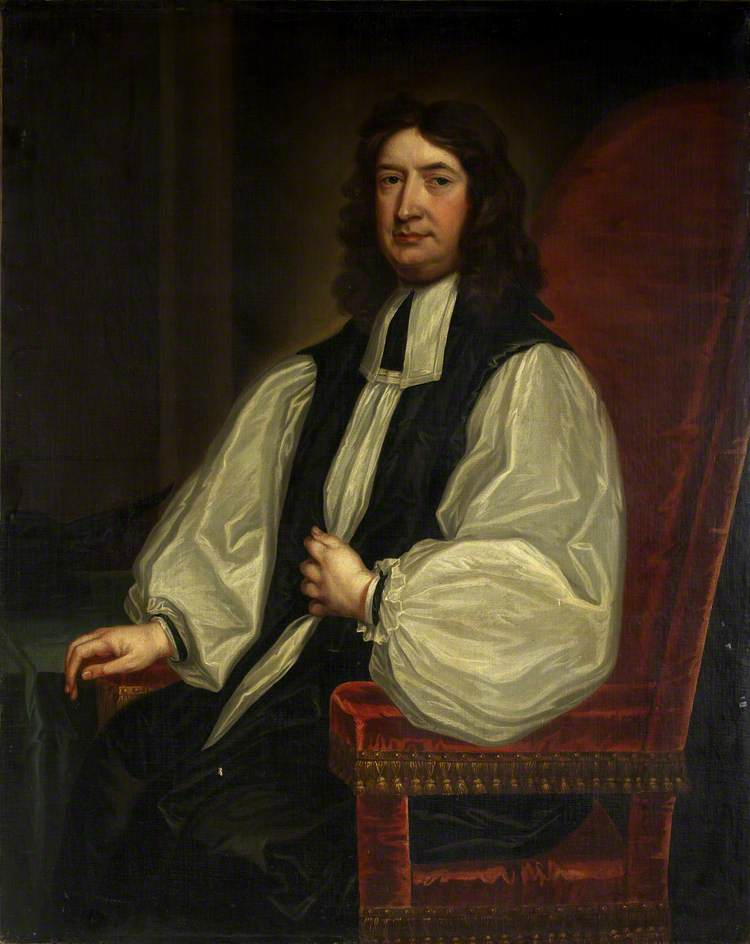
- Appointed: 31 August 1724
- In office: 1724–1742
- Predecessor: Thomas Lindsay
- Successor: John Hoadly
- Previous post: Bishop of Bristol (1719–1724)

Orders
- Consecration: 15 November 1719 by William Wake

Personal details
- Born: 4 January 1672 London, England
- Died: 27 September 1742 (aged 70) London, England
- Buried: Westminster Abbey
- Denomination: Anglican
- Spouse: Elizabeth Savage
- Education: Merchant Taylors' School
- Alma mater: Christ Church, Oxford; Magdalen College, Oxford

Hugh Boulter (4 January 1672 – 27 September 1742) was the Church of Ireland Archbishop of Armagh, the Primate of All Ireland, from 1724 until his death. He also served as the chaplain to George I from 1719.

== Background and education ==
Boulter was born in London, son of John Boulter, described as a man of "good reputation and estate", and was educated at Merchant Taylors' School before attending Christ Church, Oxford. However, after only a year at Christ Church, he transferred to Magdalen College.

== Career ==
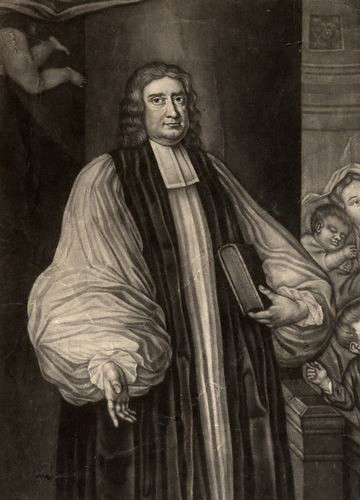
Hugh Boulter, mezzotint by John Brooks after Francis Bindon.

After leaving the university in 1700 Boulter served as a chaplain to several prominent individuals, including Sir Charles Hedges, the Secretary of State for the North, and Thomas Tenison, the Archbishop of Canterbury, before being awarded his D.D. in 1708.

After spending seven years working as a rector, Boulter was appointed as the archdeacon of Surrey in 1715. In 1719 Boulter was announced as the successor to George Smalridge as both the Dean of Christ Church and as the Bishop of Bristol. Boulter was controversially offered the primacy of the Church of Ireland in 1724, William King, who as Archbishop of Dublin was the natural successor to the title, being passed over due to his opposition to the Toleration Act, although the official reason was his age. King showed his bitter disappointment at being passed over by refusing to stand in Boulter's presence. As Archbishop of Armagh Boulter was a keen supporter of the so-called English interest, and supported the policy of filling all top judicial, political, and ecclesiastical posts in Ireland with Englishmen in order to maintain English power in the country, a position that made him unpopular in Ireland. As Archbishop of Armagh, Boulter served as one of the Lord Justices eight times between 1726 and 1742.

He did not always get his own way on judicial appointments: the Dublin-born John Rogerson (1676-1741) was made Lord Chief Justice of Ireland in 1727, over strong objections from Boulter, who apart from the question of nationality, disliked him personally. His failure to veto the appointment has been explained by the fact that no English judge was willing to take the position (in addition Richardson was a very rich man, and no doubt supplied financial inducements).

His policy was to leave the Roman Catholics in Ireland subjected to penal legislation. By a statute enacted through Boulter's influence, Catholics were excluded from the legal profession and disqualified from holding offices connected with the administration of law. Under another act passed through Boulter's exertions, they were deprived of the right of voting at elections for members of parliament or magistrates—the sole constitutional right which they had been allowed to exercise. His actions were often viewed with suspicion by the people of Ireland, including Jonathan Swift.

When the harvest failed in 1729 in Ulster he bought food and supplied it to the region. He did much good work in trying to alleviate the Great Irish Famine (1740-1741).

In 1731 he submitted the findings of the Inquiry into Illegal Popish Schools by the House of Lords, which was set up "to prevent the growth of Popery, and to secure this Kingdom from any dangers from the great Number of Papists in this Nation". He supported the setting up of the charter school system, "to teach the children of the papists the English tongue, and the principles of the Christian religion", as long as they converted to Protestantism. In 1731 George II was petitioned for a charter to set up these schools, which was granted in 1733. Boulter contributed £400 towards the construction of a charter school for girls at Santry, Dublin.

He was responsible for forcing through a bill that revalued the price of gold in 1738, to the benefit of the poor.

== Arms ==
Coat of arms of Hugh Boulter

Escutcheon
Quarterly Azure and Ermine in first quarter a dove Proper in fourth an arrow point towards the base Or.
Motto
When Boulter was serving as a bishop his arms would be displayed impaled with the arms of the diocese and topped with a mitre.

Academic offices
Preceded by George Smalridge	Dean of Christ Church, Oxford; 1719–1724	Succeeded by William Bradshaw
Church of England titles
Preceded by George Smalridge	Bishop of Bristol; 1719–1724	Succeeded by William Bradshaw
Church of Ireland titles
Preceded by Thomas Lindsay	Archbishop of Armagh; 1724–1742	Succeeded by John Hoadly
