= Francis Brewster (Irish MP) =

Irish politician

Francis Brewster was an Irish politician.

Brasier was born in Dublin educated at Trinity College, Dublin. He was MP for Midleton from 1693 until 1703, and Dingle from 1703 until 1713.
