= Hill Mussenden =

MP for Harwich

Hill Mussenden (1699 – 23 November 1772) was an English politician who served as MP for Harwich from 1741 till 1747.

He was the second son of John Mussenden and Jane (nee Leathes). He married Martha, the daughter of Sir Henry Johnson.
