= St John Brodrick (1627–1711) =

Irish politician

Sir St John Brodrick, of Midleton (3 December 1627 – January 1711) was an Irish Member of Parliament.

He represented County Cork in the Irish House of Commons from 1692 to 1693 and from 1695 to 1699.

He was the son of Sir Thomas Brodrick, of Wandsworth, by his wife Katherine, daughter of Robert Nicholas, of Manningford Bruce. Through her mother Katherine was granddaughter of Nicholas St John, of Lydiard Tregoze, and first cousin of Sir John St John, 1st Baronet.

By his wife Alice Clayton he was father of (among others):

- Thomas Brodrick (1654–1730)
- Alan Brodrick, 1st Viscount Midleton (c.1656–1728)
- St John Brodrick (1659–1707)
