= Jepson (surname) =

- Pronunciation: jep-son

Origin
- Origin: Middle English; North Germanic
- Meaning: Geoffrey's son
- Region of origin: British Isles

Other names
- Variant forms: Jepsen, Jephson

Jepson is an English language patronymic surname meaning "Geoffrey’s son". The prefix "Jep" is also the diminutive given name. Jepson has alternate spellings, including Jepsen and Jephson. Jepson as a given name is rare.

Notable people with the surname Jepson include:

- Arthur Jepson (1915–1997), English first-class cricketer and football goalkeeper
- Audi Jepson (b. 1994), American soccer player
- Barry Jepson (1929–2001), English footballer
- Barry Jepson, British bassist of Southern Death Cult and Into a Circle
- Ben Jepson (b. 2001), Australian-rules footballer
- Benjamin Jepson (1832–1914), American music educator
- Bert Jepson (1902–1981), footballer
- Brian Jepson (b. 1970), American voice actor
- Craig Jepson (b. 1957 or 1958), New Zealoand politician
- Duncan Jepson, British solicitor in Hong Kong
- Edgar Jepson (1863–1938), English novelist
- Harry Benjamin Jepson (1870–1952), American organist and composer
- Harry Jepson (1920–2016), English rugby league player
- Helen Jepson (1904–1997), American opera singer
- Herbert Jepson (1908–1993), American artist and founder of the Jepson Art Institute
- Jack Jepson, New Zealand footballer
- James Jepson Binns (1855–1928), English pipe-organ builder
- Jim Jepson (1942–1989), Canadian politician
- Jimmy Jepson (1899–1987), English footballer
- Joanna Jepson (born 1976), English Church of England curate
- Johan Jepson (b. 1985), Swedish handball player
- Kate Jepson (1860–1923), American actress
- Kristine Jepson (1962–2017), American opera singer
- Maddie Grace Jepson (born 1999), English media personality
- Margaret Jepson (1907–2003), English writer
- Melvin E. Jepson, Nevada politician
- Robert S. Jepson Jr. (born 1942), American philanthropist and businessman
- Ronnie Jepson (born 1963), English footballer
- Selwyn Jepson (1899–1989), British author, screenwriter and director
- Stephen Jepson (b. 1941), American ceramacist
- Steven B. Jepson (born 1960), American opera singer
- Toby Jepson (born 1967), English musician and actor
- Tristan Jepson (1978–2004), Australian writer
- Vicky Jepson (born 1988), English footballer
- Warner Jepson (1930–2011), American composer
- Willis Linn Jepson (1867–1946), American botanist

== See also ==
=== Additional people ===
- Belita, Olympic figure skater, dancer and early film actress Maria Belita Gladys Olivie Lynn Jepson-Turner (1923–2005)
- Cecil Halliday Jepson Harcourt, British naval officer
- Henry Jepson Latham, American politician
- James Jepson Binns, English organ maker
- Peter Jepson-Young (born 1957), Canadian AIDS-awareness educator
- Thomas Jepson Gascoyne, English cyclist

=== Other uses ===
- Jepson (disambiguation), for other uses
- Jepsen
- Jepsonia
