= Jaha =

Jaha or JAHA may refer to:

== People and fictional characters ==
- Jaha (given name), given name
- Jaha (surname)

- Thelonious Jaha, also referred to mononymously as "Jaha", character in the American science fiction drama The 100

== Other uses ==
- Japanese Animal Hospital Association
- Journal of the American Heart Association
- Journal of Ancient History and Archaeology
- Johnstown Area Heritage Association

== See also ==
- Jaha-dong, group of valleys in South Korea
- Jaha's Promise, 2017 American-Gambian documentary drama
