= Jebsen =

Jebsen may refer to:

== People ==
- Atle Jebsen (1935–2009), Norwegian businessperson and ship-owner
- Finn Jebsen (born 1950), Norwegian businessperson
- Gustav Adolf Jebsen (1884–1951), Norwegian industrialist
- Johnny Jebsen (1917–1945), anti-Nazi German intelligence officer and British double agent
- Jørg Tofte Jebsen (1888–1922), Norwegian physicist, discovered and published Birkhoff's theorem
- Kristian Gerhard Jebsen (1927–2004), Norwegian ship-owner
- Michael Jebsen (1835–1899), German ship owner and politician
- Peter Jebsen (born 1824), Norwegian businessperson and politician
- Sigurd Jebsen Grieg (1894–1973), Norwegian museologist and archeologist
- Hans Michael Jebsen (born 1956), Hong Kong-based Danish businessperson and land owner

== Businesses ==
- Jebsen & Jessen (SEA), engineering, manufacturing and distribution company in Southeast Asia
- Jebsen Group, marketing and distribution company based and headquartered in Hong Kong
- Jebsen Wilson Euro Carriers, shortsea liner shipping company

== Geography ==
- Jebsen Point at the south side of Port Jebsen, Signy Island, in the South Orkney Islands
- Jebsen Rocks, chain of rocks north of Jebsen Point, Signy Island, in the South Orkney Islands
- Port Jebsen, cove immediately north of Jebsen Point, Signy Island, in the South Orkney Islands

== See also ==
- Jebsens
- Jebsheim
- Jeppesen
- Jepsen
