= Ipsen (surname) =

Ipsen is a Danish patronymic surname meaning "son of Ip", which is a Danish parallel form of the biblical given name Jacob. The equivalent Eastern Danish form of Jacob is Ib, resulting in the patronymic surname Ibsen. Other variants include Jepsen and Jebsen.

People bearing the name Ipsen include:

- Anton Ipsen (born 1994), Danish swimmer
- Bodil Ipsen (1889–1964), Danish actress and film director
- Ernest Ludvig Ipsen (1869–1951), American portrait painter
- Henrik Ipsen (born 1973), Danish footballer
- Julie Finne-Ipsen (born 1995), Danish badminton player
- Kasper Ipsen (born 1984), Danish badminton player
- Louise Ipsen (1822–1905), Danish businessperson
- Ludvig Sandöe Ipsen (1840–1920), Danish-American artist and designer
- Steen Ipsen (born 1966), Danish contemporary artist
- Lois Ibsen al-Faruqi (1926–1986), American scholar and expert on Islamic art and music

== See also ==
- Jeppesen
