= Jeppsson =

Jeppsson is a surname. Notable people with the surname include:

- Frans Jeppsson-Wall (born 1998), Swedish mixed race performer of Swedish and Nigerian-British descent
- Håkan Jeppsson (1961–2018), Swedish businessman and football chairman
- Hans Jeppsson or Hasse Jeppson (1925–2013), Swedish footballer
- Johanna Jeppsson, sidecar passenger in Swedish sidecarcross team Conny and Johanna Strandberg
- Kerstin Jeppsson (born 1948), Swedish composer
- Peter Jeppsson (born 1968), Swedish social democratic politician, member of the Riksdag since 2006
- Simon Jeppsson (born 1995), Swedish handball player
- Viggo Jeppsson (born 2006), Swedish footballer

== See also ==
- Jephson
- Jepsen
- Jepson (disambiguation)
