= Ibsen (disambiguation) =

Henrik Ibsen (1828–1906) was a Norwegian playwright, theatre director, and poet.

Ibsen may also refer to:

== People ==
- Ibsen (name), a surname and given name, including a list of people with that name

== Places ==
- Lake Ibsen, a small lake near Leeds in Benson County, North Dakota, U.S.
  - Lake Ibsen Township, Benson County, North Dakota
- Ibsen (crater), on the planet Mercury

== Other uses ==
- Ibsen Museum (Oslo), Norway, a museum occupying the last home of Henrik Ibsen
- International Ibsen Award, a Norwegian government award for drama and theatre
- Norwegian Ibsen Award, an award from Ibsen's hometown to playwrights
- Ibsen Studies, a peer-reviewed academic journal
- MS Henrik Ibsen, a ship launched in 1907

== See also ==
- Ebsen, a name
- Jepsen, a name
