= Jeppson =

Jeppson is a surname. Notable people with the surname include:

- Hasse Jeppson (1925–2013), Swedish football striker
- Janet Jeppson Asimov (1926–2019), American science fiction author, psychiatrist, and a psychoanalyst
- John Jeppson (1844–1920), industrialist in Worcester, Massachusetts, founder of the Norton Company
- Morris R. Jeppson (1922–2010), Second Lieutenant in the United States Army Air Forces during World War II

See also:

- Jeppson's Malört, a Chicago liquor

== See also ==
- Jeppsson
- Jepson (disambiguation)
