= Jeppesen (surname) =

Jeppesen is a Danish patronymic surname meaning "son of Jeppe", which is a Western Danish parallel form of the biblical given name Jacob. A slightly abbreviated form is Jepsen (alternatively Jebsen). The equivalent Eastern Danish form of Jacob is Ib resulting in the patronymic surname Ibsen (rarely Ipsen).

People with the surname include:

- Carl Jeppesen (1858–1930), Danish-born Norwegian newspaper editor and politician
- Elrey Borge Jeppesen (1907–1996), aviation pioneer of navigational maps and charts
- Hans Nielsen Jeppesen (1815–1883), Danish merchant and ship-owner
- Jørn Jeppesen (1919–1964), Danish stage and film actor
- Knud Jeppesen (1892–1974), Danish composer, musicologist and writer
- Lars Krogh Jeppesen (born 1979), Danish handball player
- Lis Jeppesen (born 1956), Danish ballet dancer
- Louis Jeppesen (1891–1975), Danish-American politician from Nebraska
- Martin Jeppesen (born 1970), Danish veteran football player
- Steven Jeppesen (born 1984), Danish-born Swedish golfer
- Travis Jeppesen (born 1979), American novelist and poet

== See also ==
- Jebsen (disambiguation)
- Jepsen
- Jepson (disambiguation)
- Ibsen (disambiguation)
- Bodil Ipsen
