= Jepson =

Jepson may refer to:

== Buildings in the United States ==
- Jepson Center for the Arts in Savannah, Georgia
- Jepson Herbarium, Botanical Natural History Museum, University of California, Berkeley
- on the University of Richmond campus:
  - Jepson Hall
  - Alice Andrews Jepson Theater
  - Jepson Alumni Center

== Places in the United States ==
- James Jepson Jr. House, a historic house in Virgin, Utah
- Jepson Island, Connecticut
- Jepson Peak, a mountain in Southern California's San Bernardino Mountains
- Jepson Prairie, a protected prairie in the Sacramento Valley of California
- Mount Jepson, a mountain along the border between California's Inyo and Fresno counties

== People ==
- Jepson (surname), including a list of people

== Plants ==
- Jepson's bedstraw
- Jepson ceanothus
- Jepson's monkeyflower
- Jepson's onion
- Jepson's pincushionplant or Jepson's navarretia
- Jepson's willow
- Jepson's woolly sunflower

== Other uses ==
- Jepson Art Institute, Los Angeles, California, USA
- Jepson's Farm and Jepson's Gate of Anglezarke, a civil parish in Lancashire, England
- The Jepson Laurel, the oldest known living laurel tree
- The Jepson Manual, California plant identification often referred to as simply Jepson
- Jepson School of Leadership Studies, University of Richmond, Virginia, USA
- Harry Jepson Trophy, a rugby trophy
- Jepson Way, the grounds of A.F.C. Blackpool

== See also ==
- Jepson claim, in United States patent law, a claim where one or more limitations are specifically identified as a point of novelty
- Jepsen
- Jepsonia, a genus of flowering plants
- Jeppo (disambiguation)
