= International Ibsen Award =

The International Ibsen Award (Norwegian Den internasjonale Ibsenprisen honours an individual, institution or organization that has brought new artistic dimensions to the world of drama or theater. The committee members consists of figures in the theatre community.

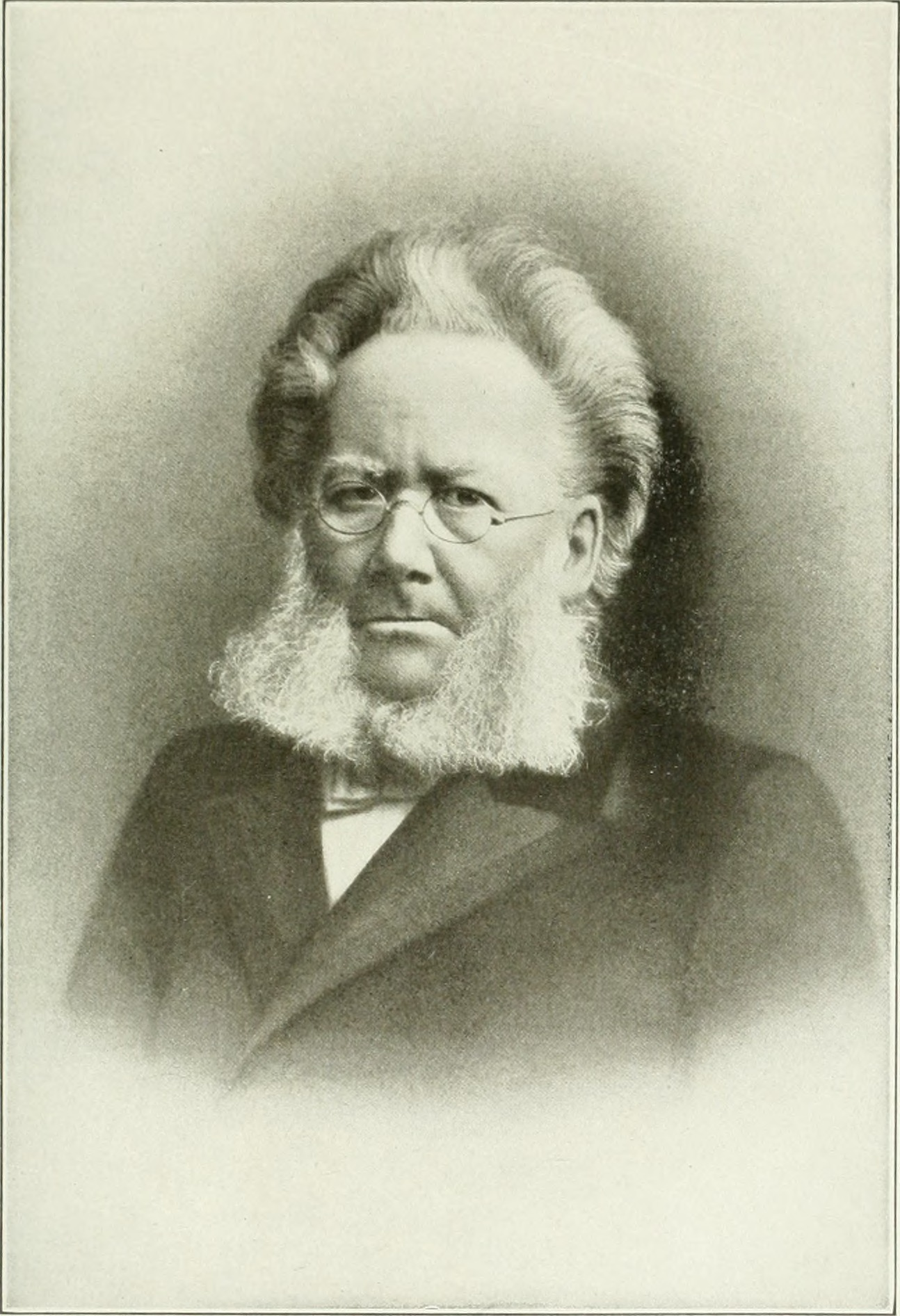
Henrik Ibsen

The award was established by the Norwegian government in 2008. The International Ibsen Award is the world’s leading theatre prize, awarded for extraordinary achievements in the spirit of Henrik Ibsen. The recipient is announced on 20 March, which is also Henrik Ibsen's birthday, and the prize consists of NOK 2,5 millions making it the largest theatre award in the world and one of the richest literary prizes in the world. The Norwegian National Theatre serves as the Secretariat for the award and it is awarded at The Norwegian National Theatre´s Ibsen Festival every other year. The first laureate was British theatre and film director Peter Brook who received the prize on 31 August 2008 during the Ibsen Festival at the Nationaltheatret. The chair of the jury was then Liv Ullmann. In 2011 the prize was made biennial, with the next awarding scheduled for September 2012. It was announced on 20 March that the 2012 award will go to Heiner Goebbels.

== Winners ==
- 2008 Peter Brook
- 2009 Ariane Mnouchkine
- 2010 Jon Fosse
- 2012 Heiner Goebbels
- 2014 Peter Handke
- 2016 Forced Entertainment
- 2018 Christoph Marthaler
- 2020 Taylor Mac
- 2022 Back to Back Theatre
- 2024 Lola Arias
- 2026 Jaha Koo

== See also ==
- Centre for Ibsen Studies
- Ibsen Studies
- Norwegian Ibsen Award
