= Strandberg =

Strandberg is a surname of Swedish origin which may refer to:

- Alfreda Strandberg (1883–1953), American songwriter
- Britt Strandberg (born 1934), Swedish cross country skier who competed in three Winter Olympics
- Carlos Strandberg (born 1996), Swedish footballer
- Conny and Johanna Strandberg, Swedish male-female sidecarcross team
- Jan-Olof Strandberg (1926–2020), Swedish stage and film actor
- John Edmund Strandberg (1911–1996), Swedish-Canadian landscape painter
- Lennart Strandberg (1915–1989), Swedish sprinter
- Mikael Strandberg (born 1962), Swedish explorer, filmmaker and writer
- Stefan Strandberg (born 1990), Norwegian footballer
- Torkild Strandberg (born 1970), Swedish Liberal People's Party politician, former member of the Riksdag
- Ola Strandberg, founder of Strandberg Guitars
