= Jeppesen (disambiguation) =

Jeppesen is an American company and a subsidiary of Boeing.

Jeppesen may also refer to:

- Jeppesen (surname), includes a list of people with the name
- Jeppesen Victor Martin (1930–1993), Danish artist
- Jeppesen Gymnasium, former sports facility in Houston, Texas
- Jeppesen Stadium, former name of Robertson Stadium in Houston, Texas
- Jeppesen Terminal, at Denver International Airport
