= Lola Arias =

Argentinian actress, playwright and writer

- Born: 3 December 1976 (age 49); Buenos Aires, Argentina
- Education: University of Buenos Aires
- Occupations: Actress, director, writer
- Awards: Konex Award (2014) International Ibsen Award (2024)
- Website: lolaarias.com

Lola Arias (born 3 December 1976) is an Argentine writer, theatre, and film director known for her diverse creative pursuits spanning multiple artistic media. In 2024, Arias won the prestigious International Ibsen Award.

== Education ==
Lola Arias obtained a degree in literature from the Universidad de Buenos Aires, followed by further specialization in dramaturgy at the Escuela de Artes Dramáticas in Buenos Aires. Additionally, she undertook playwrights' residencies at the Royal Court Theatre in London and Casa de América in Madrid. In 2014, Arias completed the Film Laboratory workshop at the Universidad Di Tella in Buenos Aires.

== Works ==
Her collaborative projects often involve marginalized groups, including war veterans, refugees, and individuals from the sex worker community, encompasses a wide array of mediums, including theatre, film, literature, music, and visual arts. Arias's approach to storytelling is to blend reality with fiction. In collaboration with Stefan Kaegi of Rimini Protokoll, she contributed to several projects, including Chácara Paraíso (2007), Airport Kids (2008), and Ciudades Paralelas (2010). Ciudades Paralelas was a festival of urban interventions that took place in Berlin, Buenos Aires, Warsaw, Zurich, and other cities.

=== Theatre ===
From 2001 to 2007, Arias wrote six fictional works: The Squalid Family, Studies of Loving Memory, Poses for Sleeping, and the trilogy comprising Love is a Sniper, Revolver Dream, and Striptease. Transitioning to documentary theatre in 2007, Arias collaborated with individuals who had undergone diverse experiences. Her creations include My Life After (CTBA, Buenos Aires, 2009), which draws upon the life narratives of six performers reenacting their parents' ordeals during Argentina's dictatorship, and Familienbande (Münchner Kammerspiele, Munich, 2009), an exploration of contemporary family dynamics.

Arias's work That Enemy Within (HAU, Berlin, 2010) engages identical twins in a discourse on identity. The Year I was Born (Teatro a Mil, Santiago, 2012) is based on stories of individuals born during Pinochet's dictatorship. Melancholy and Demonstrations (Wiener Festwochen, Vienna, 2012) delves into Arias's mother's depression, while The Art of Making Money (Stadttheater Bremen, 2013) confronts themes of fiction and compassion through the lens of beggars, prostitutes, and street musicians. The Art of Arriving (Stadttheater Bremen, 2015) discusses starting anew in a foreign land, with Bulgarian children in Germany as the focal point.

Minefield (Royal Court Theatre, London, 2016) unites British and Argentinian veterans of the Falkland/Malvinas war, while Atlas des Kommunismus (Maxim-Gorki Theater, Berlin, 2016) weaves together the stories of women from East Germany. What They Want to Hear (Münchner Kammerspiele, Munich, 2018) reconstructs the predicament of a Syrian archaeologist entangled in German bureaucracy, while Futureland (Maxim Gorki Theater, Berlin, 2019) involves unaccompanied minors who migrated to Germany. Ich bin nicht tot (Staatstheater Hannover and Theaterformen Festival, 2021) features individuals over sixty-five contemplating their societal roles amid the pandemic.

Mother Tongue explores reproduction in the twenty-first century through performances in Bologna, Madrid, and Berlin, while Happy Nights (Theater Bremen, 2023) invites audiences into immersive spaces to contemplate themes of sex, money, lust, and pain alongside dancers and sex workers.

Her theatrical works have been featured at Festival d'Avignon, Lift Festival in London, Under the Radar in New York, Theater Spektakel in Zurich, Wiener Festwochen, Festival Theaterformen, and Spielart Festival in Munich. Her performances have been staged in Théâtre de la Ville in Paris, REDCAT in Los Angeles, Walker Art Center in Minneapolis, Parque de la Memoria in Buenos Aires, Museum of Contemporary Art Chicago, and MoMA Museum in New York.

=== Films ===
Arias's debut feature film, Theatre of War (2018) – adapted from her stage production Minefield – was presented at the 68th Forum of the Berlinale Film Festival, receiving the CICAE Art Cinema Award, the Prize of the Ecumenical Jury and the Best Director Award at the 20th BAFICI Festival. It was also awarded the Movistar+ Prize for Best Documentary Film at Documenta Madrid and the Silver Condor Award for Best Adapted Script. Her short film Far Away from Russia (2021) was commissioned by the Manchester International Festival. Her second feature film, Reas (2024), premiered at the 74th Forum of the Berlinale Film Festival, reimagines the musical genre within a documentary framework, interweaving the narratives of cisgender women and transgender individuals who have experienced incarceration. The film blends their personal stories and encounters with music and choreography.

Her films have been screened at international film festivals such as Berlinale, San Sebastian, and BFI. Her second feature film Reas got the Best Documentary Award at the Luxemburg Film Festival.

=== Curatorship ===
In the field of visual arts and curating, she initiated My Documents, a lecture-performance series featuring artists from diverse backgrounds presenting their personal research. She conceived Audition for a Demonstration, a durational performance involving spontaneous auditions for re-enacting past demonstrations. Notable exhibitions include Stunt Double (Buenos Aires, 2016), consisting of four installations reconstructing the past 40 years of Argentinian social and political history through reenactments, interviews, and protest songs, as well as Ways of Walking with a Book in Your Hand (Buenos Aires, 2017), a site-specific project for readers in libraries and public spaces.

=== Music ===
She collaborated with Ulises Conti on the albums Love is a Sniper (2007) and Those Who do not Sleep (2011).

=== Publications ===
Her publications include Love is a Sniper (2007, Entropía), The Postnuclear Ones (2011, Emecé), and My Life After and Other Plays (2016, Penguin Random House), along with a bilingual edition of her play Minefield (2017, Oberon Books). In 2019, Performance Research Studies released Re-enacting Life, a compilation of articles, writings and documents about her works and poetics.

== Works ==
- Las impúdicas en el paraíso (poetry collection, 2000)
- La escuálida familia (theater, performed at the Teatro Rojas, 2001)
- Estudios de la memoria amorosa (theater, performed at the Centro Experimental del Colón, 2003)
- Poses para dormir (theater, 2004)
- Trilogy Striptease, Sueño con revólver, and El amor es un francotirador (theater, Ed. Entropía, 2004)
- El amor es un francotirador (album of music together with Ulises Conti, 2007)
- Familienbande (theater, 2009)
- Mi nombre cuando yo ya no exista (theater, Ed. Cierto Pez, Chile, 2009)
- That enemy with in (theater, 2010)
- Los posnucleares (book of short stories, Ed. Emecé, 2011)
- Los que no duermen (album of music together with Ulises Conti, 2011)
- Melancolía y Manifestaciones (theater, 2012)
- El año en que nací (theater, 2012)
- El arte de hacer dinero (theater, inspired by The Threepenny Opera by Bertolt Brecht, 2013)
- Mis documentos (cycle of performance lectures, 2012, 2013, 2014)
- Veteranos (film 2014)
- The art of arriving (theater, 2015)
- Doble de Riesgo (exhibition, 2016)
- Atlas del Comunismo (theater, 2016)
- Campo Minado (theater, 2016)
- Teatro de Guerra (film, 2018)
- Audición para una manifestación (performance, 2014-2019)
- Formas de caminar con un libro en la mano (performance, 2017-2021)
- What they want to hear (theater, 2018)
- Futureland (theater, 2019)
- Slow Motion (exhibition, 2021)
- Ich bin nicht tot (theater, 2021)
- Far away from Russia (film, 2021)
- Lengua Madre (theater, 2021-2022)
- Happy Nights (theater, 2023)
- Reas (film, 2024)
- Los dìas afuera (theater, 2024)

== Filmography ==
=== Director ===
- Teatro de guerra (2018)
- Reas (2024)

=== Actress ===
- Cien pesos (2003, short)
- Potestad as Adriana's mother (2003)
- La prisionera as Isabel (2006)
- Historias extraordinarias as Alicia (2008)

== Awards ==
- 2014 Konex Award Diploma of Merit as one of the five most important figures in Argentine letters in the discipline "Teatro: Quinquenio 2009–2013"
- 2018 Preis der Autoren
- 2024 The International Ibsen Award
