= Jaha (given name) =

Jaha is a given name of different origins. Notable people with the name include:

- Jaha Dukureh, Gambian women's rights activist
- Jaha Howard, American politician
- Jaha Koo (born 1984), South Korean theater creator, composer, and video artist
