= Gustav Adolf Jebsen =

Norwegian industrialist (1884–1951)

Gustav Adolf Jebsen (30 January 1884 – 20 January 1951) was a Norwegian industrialist.

== Personal life ==
He was born in Bergen as the youngest son of factory owner and ship-owner Peter Jebsen (1824–1892) and Sophie Catharina Sundt (1849–1912). He was a brother of Kristian Gerhard Sundt Jebsen and maternal grandson of Christian Gerhard Ameln Sundt. In 1917 he married attorney's daughter Lilla Døscher. He was a granduncle of Kristian Gerhard Jebsen and Atle Jebsen, and an uncle of Kristian Jebsen.

== Career ==
Jebsen finished education in machine engineering at Bergen technical school at the age of seventeen, and studied chemistry at the Technische Hochschulen in Hanover (now Leibniz University Hannover) and Charlottenburg (now Technische Universität Berlin). He took the doctorate in Zurich in 1905 with the thesis Zur Kenntnis der Phenoxymucobrom- und Chlorsäure als aromatische Verbindungen. From 1905 to 1906 he studied at Sorbonne.

In 1906 he was hired in Sam Eyde's company Elektrokemisk. Together with Peder Farup he discovered and innovated the use of titanium dioxide as the pigment titanium white; together with the exploitation of the Søderberg electrode, this was the most important innovation during Jebsen's time.

The process of producing titanium white was figured out in 1914. Before that, Jebsen had become chief executive officer of Elektrokemisk in 1912. In 1916 he became chairman of the new company Titan Co. which produced titanium dioxide. In 1919 he briefly served as the first president of the Federation of Norwegian Industries. During the post-World War I economic crisis he had to leave Elektrokemisk in 1920, but became chief executive officer of Titan Co. in 1924. The shares in Titan Co. plummeted until being bought in 1927 by the American corporation National Lead along with the patent rights for titanium white. Jebsen was hired in National Lead, and worked out of Paris, from 1929 as chief executive of Titan Co. Inc in Europe. The corporation included companies such as Titangesellschaft in Germany and British Titan Products.

In 1940 Jebsen moved from Paris to New York City. In 1943 Nygaardsvold's Cabinet, exiled from Norway because of the war, named industrial committees consisting of expatriates in London and New York, and Jebsen worked for the New York-based committee. For his work here he was decorated as a Knight, First Class of the Royal Norwegian Order of St. Olav after the war, in 1946. He died in January 1951 in London.

Business positions
Preceded by position created	President of the Federation of Norwegian Industries; 1919	Succeeded by Christian Emil Stoud Platou
