= Ibsen (name) =

Ibsen is a Danish surname most commonly associated with the Norwegian playwright and poet Henrik Ibsen (whose family was of Danish origin). The name may also appear as Ebsen. The name is originally a patronymic, meaning "son of Ib" (Ib is a Danish variant of Jacob); however, Henrik Ibsen's family had used the name as a "frozen" patronymic (i.e. a permanent family name) since the 17th century.

== Henrik Ibsen's family ==
- Ibsen (family), including
- Henrik Ibsen (1828–1906)
- Suzannah Ibsen (1836–1914), wife of Henrik Ibsen
- Sigurd Ibsen (1859–1930), Norwegian author and politician, son of Henrik and Suzannah Ibsen
- Tancred Ibsen (1893–1978), Norwegian filmmaker and actor, son of Sigurd Ibsen
- Lillebil Ibsen (1899–1989), Norwegian dancer and actress, wife of Tancred Ibsen

== Other people named Ibsen ==
given name

- Ibson Dana Elcar (1927–2005), actor
- Ibsen Martínez (born 1951), Venezuelan journalist and playwright

surname

- Bergliot Ibsen (1869–1953), Norwegian mezzo-soprano singer
- Bjørn Aage Ibsen (1915–2007), Danish anesthetist and inventor of intensive-care medicine
- Frederik Ibsen (born 1997), Danish footballer
- Michael Ibsen (born 1958), English cabinetmaker whose DNA allowed the skeleton of King Richard III of England to be identified
- Rikke Ibsen (born 1990), Danish sport shooter
- Zak Ibsen (born 1972), American soccer player
- Zeno Ibsen Rossi (born 2000), English footballer

== See also ==
- Ibsen (disambiguation)
- Ipsen (surname)
- Jepsen
- Jeppesen
