= Bulk Jupiter =

Cargo ship sunk in 2015

History

Bahamas
- Name: Bulk Jupiter
- Owner: Gearbulk
- Operator: Gearbulk Norway
- Port of registry: Bahamas
- Builder: Mitsui Ichihara Engineering & Shipbuilding
- Launched: 10 June 2006
- Out of service: January 2, 2015
- Identification: IMO number: 9339947; MMSI number: 311060600; Callsign: C6ZN6
- Fate: Sank off the coast of Vung Tau, Vietnam

General characteristics
- Tonnage: 31,256 GT; 56,009 DWT
- Length: 190 metres (620 ft)
- Beam: 32 metres (105 ft)
- Draught: 12.575 metres (41.26 ft)
- Speed: 15 knots (28 km/h)
- Crew: 19 (16 lost, 2 dead, 1 survivor)

Bulk Jupiter was a Bahamas registered cargo ship. She sank off the coast of Vietnam on 2 January 2015.

== History ==
=== Sinking ===
On 2 January 2015, Bulk Jupiter sank off the coast of Vũng Tàu, Vietnam. She departed from Kuantan, Malaysia on 30 December 2014 with a crew of 19 Filipino sailors and a cargo of 46,400 tons of bauxite.

The Vietnam Maritime Search and Rescue Coordination Center (Vietnam MRCC) and the Japanese Coast Guard received distress signals at 22:54 hours UTC on 1 January in position lat 9".01' 01:001N, long 109" 15' 26.01E from Bulk Jupiter, but were unable to make contact with the vessel.

Dispatched rescue vessels found one crew member, the ship's cook, who was rescued and was the only survivor. Later searches found two other bodies. The remaining 16 crew members are presumed dead.

Early reports indicated that the likely cause of the sinking was sudden loss of stability (free surface effect) from the bauxite cargo.

== Investigation and corrective action ==
IMO has approved a circular to warn ships' masters about the liquefaction hazards of bauxite.

not to accept bauxite for carriage unless:

- the moisture limit for the specific cargo is certified as less than the indicative moisture limit of 10% and the particle size distribution as is detailed in the individual schedule for bauxite in the IMSBC Code; or
- the cargo is declared as Group A (cargoes that may liquefy) and the shipper declares the transportable moisture limit (TML) and moisture content; or
- the cargo has been assessed as not presenting Group A properties.

— IMO, Briefing: 3818/09/2015
