= Theatre of War (2018 film) =

Theatre of War (Spanish: Teatro de guerra) is a 2018 Argentine documentary film directed by Lola Arias. The film brings together six veterans of the Falklands/Malvinas War—three Argentine and three British—to reenact and reflect on their wartime experiences through performance, conversation, and roleplay. Blending documentary and theatrical elements, Theatre of War examines memory, trauma, and reconciliation, challenging national narratives and exploring the personal aftermath of conflict. The film premiered at the 2018 Berlin International Film Festival.
