= Christian Sundt =

Norwegian businessman, ship owner and philanthropist (1816–1901)

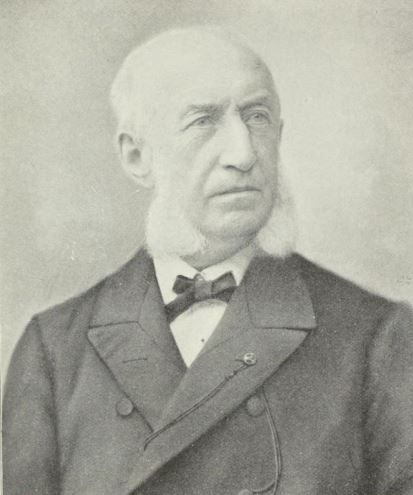
- Born: 1 July 1816; Bergen, Norway
- Died: 26 February 1901 (aged 84); Bergen, Norway
- Occupations: businessman, ship owner, philanthropist
- Relatives: Peter Jebsen (son-in-law)

Christian Gerhard Ameln Sundt (1 July 1816 – 26 February 1901) was a Norwegian businessman, ship owner and philanthropist.

== Biography ==
He was born in Bergen to merchant Henrik Leganger Sundt and Sophie Catharina Ameln. In 1835 he became associated with the manufacturing company Edvard Hambro as a clerk. He started his own business in 1845, and had success as wholesaler in the textile trade, being lucky with the timing. In 1845 the first cotton mills were established in Norway, and the first cotton weaving mill, Arne Fabrikker, was started in 1846 by Peter Jebsen (1824-1892), the future husband of his daughter Sophia Catharina Sundt (1849-1912). Sundt also started as private banker, and invested large parts of his fortune in ships that were constructed in Bergen. He was co-stakeholder in the Bergen Steamship Company. Sundt ran his business interests until in 1874 when he handed it over to his son Gerhard Sundt (1850-1910).

Sundt donated large sums of money to social, cultural and scientific purposes and also created a number of scholarships. He was a member of the municipal council of Bergen for more than forty years. He was decorated Commander, First Class of the Order of St. Olav, Knight of the Order of Dannebrog, and Knight of the Order of the Polar Star.
