= Dublin Shipping =

Irish Shipping Company

Dublin Shipping was an Irish-owned shipping company specialising in coastal tankers and, in later days, bitumen carriers. Owned by the Jones Group, Dublin, it ran ships with names such as M.T. "Rathgar" and M.T. "Rathmines"

The Jones Group had a number of shipping subsidiaries, including Celtic Coasters Ltd., Dublin & Cork Shipping Ltd., and Dublin Shipping Ltd..

The group sold its shipping interests for £20 million in 1998.

On 28 March 1998 the Dublin Shipping was taken over by Gearbulk.
