= Jeppo =

Jeppo may refer to:

- Jeppo (village), a settlement in Finland
- a soubriquet for people with the name Jepson
- Carly Rae Jepsen (b. 1985), Canadian singer
