= Nils Henrik Bruun =

Norwegian engineer (1832-1916)

- Born: 1832; Tønsberg
- Died: 1916 (aged 83–84)
- Education: Chalmers
- Occupation: engineer

Nils Henrik Bruun (1832–1916) was a Norwegian engineer.

== Biography ==
Nils Henrik Bruun was born in Tønsberg in 1832. Educated at Chalmers in Gothenburg, and in Germany, Bruun moved to Bergen in 1863 where he engaged in several engineering ventures; he and Peter Jebsen founded the factories in Dale, and later he engages in mining in Stord and Karmøy. He received the contract to build the tunnels on Vossebanen in 1875. During the 1880s he was director of Bergen Mekaniske Verksted, and in 1898 he bought half the rights to the waterfalls in Øvre Årdal, selling them to BASF in 1906. He was awarded the Order of St. Olav in 1894.

He died in February or early March 1916 at age 84.
