= Bauxite =

Sedimentary rock rich in aluminium

- Sedimentary rock
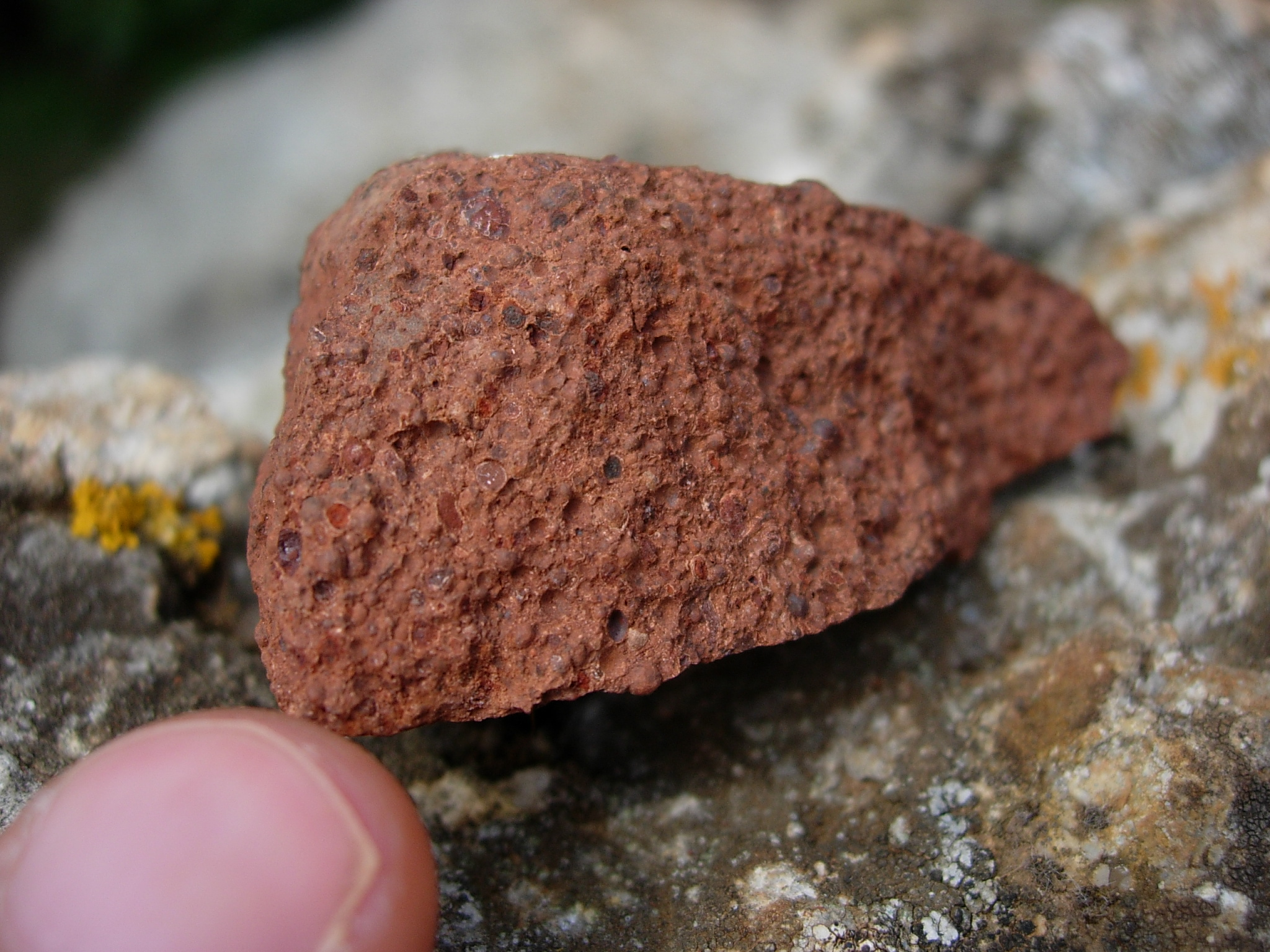
- Reddish-brown bauxite

Composition
- Aluminium hydroxide, silica, iron, kaolinite

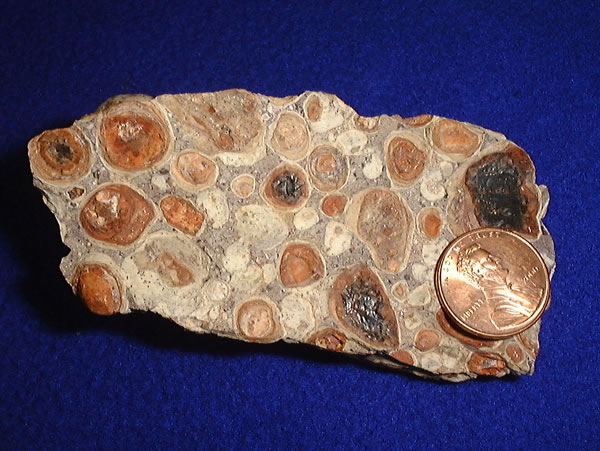
Bauxite with US penny for comparison

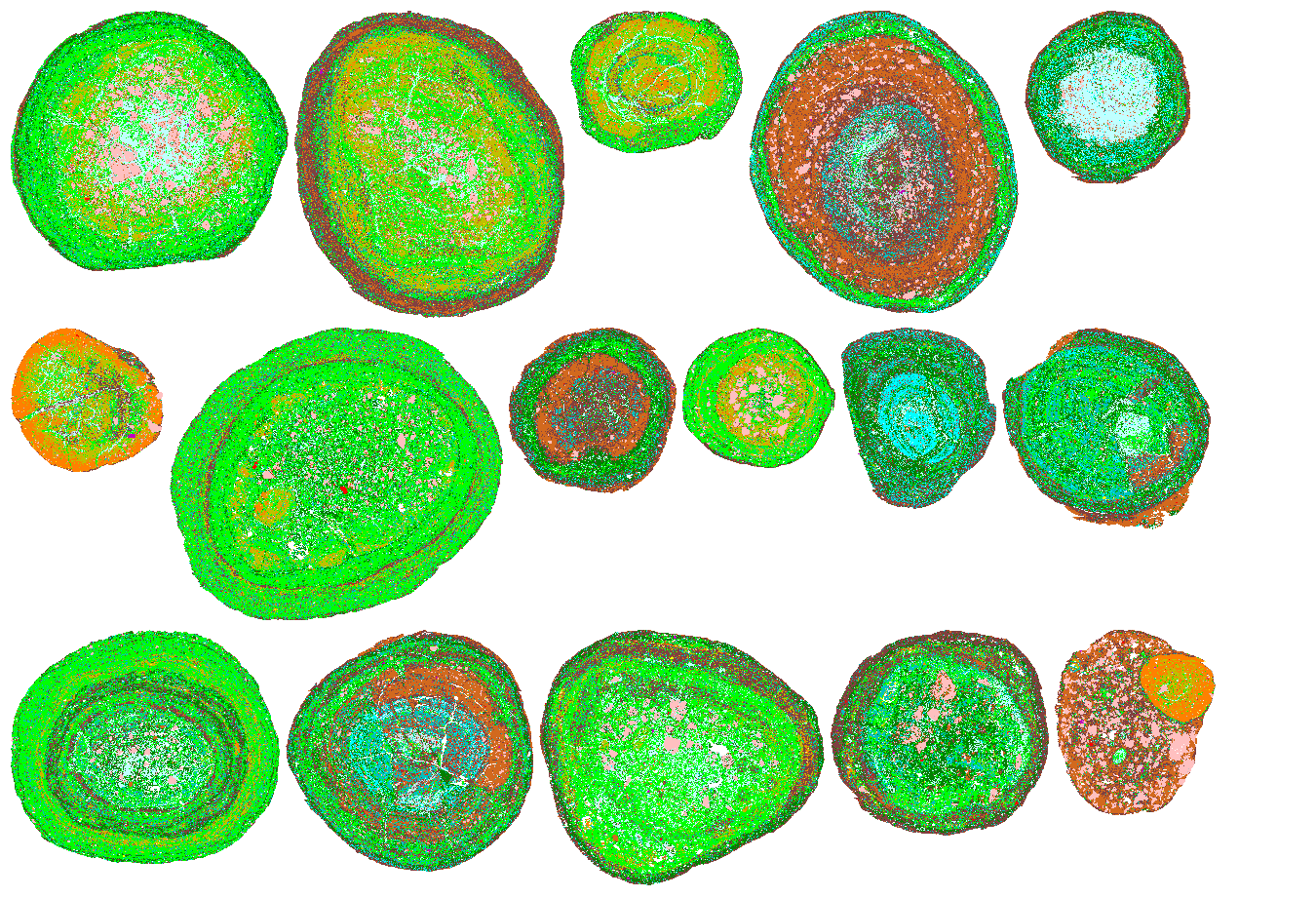
QEMSCAN mineral maps of bauxite ore-forming pisoliths

Bauxite (/ˈbɔːksaɪt/) is a sedimentary rock with a relatively high aluminium content. It is the world's main source of aluminium and gallium. Bauxite consists mostly aluminium minerals gibbsite (Al(OH)_{3}), boehmite (γ-AlO(OH)), and diaspore (α-AlO(OH)), mixed with the two iron oxides goethite (FeO(OH)) and hematite (Fe_{2}O_{3}), the aluminium clay mineral kaolinite (Al_{2}Si_{2}O_{5}(OH)_{4}) and small amounts of anatase (TiO_{2}) and ilmenite (FeTiO_{3} or FeO·TiO_{2}). Bauxite appears dull in luster and is reddish-brown, white, or tan. Bauxite has a density of 2.7 g/cm^{3} and melts at 933 K (659°C, 1219°F).

The origin of the name stems from its discovery in 1821 by the French geologist Pierre Berthier near the village of Les Baux in Provence, Southern France.

== Formation ==
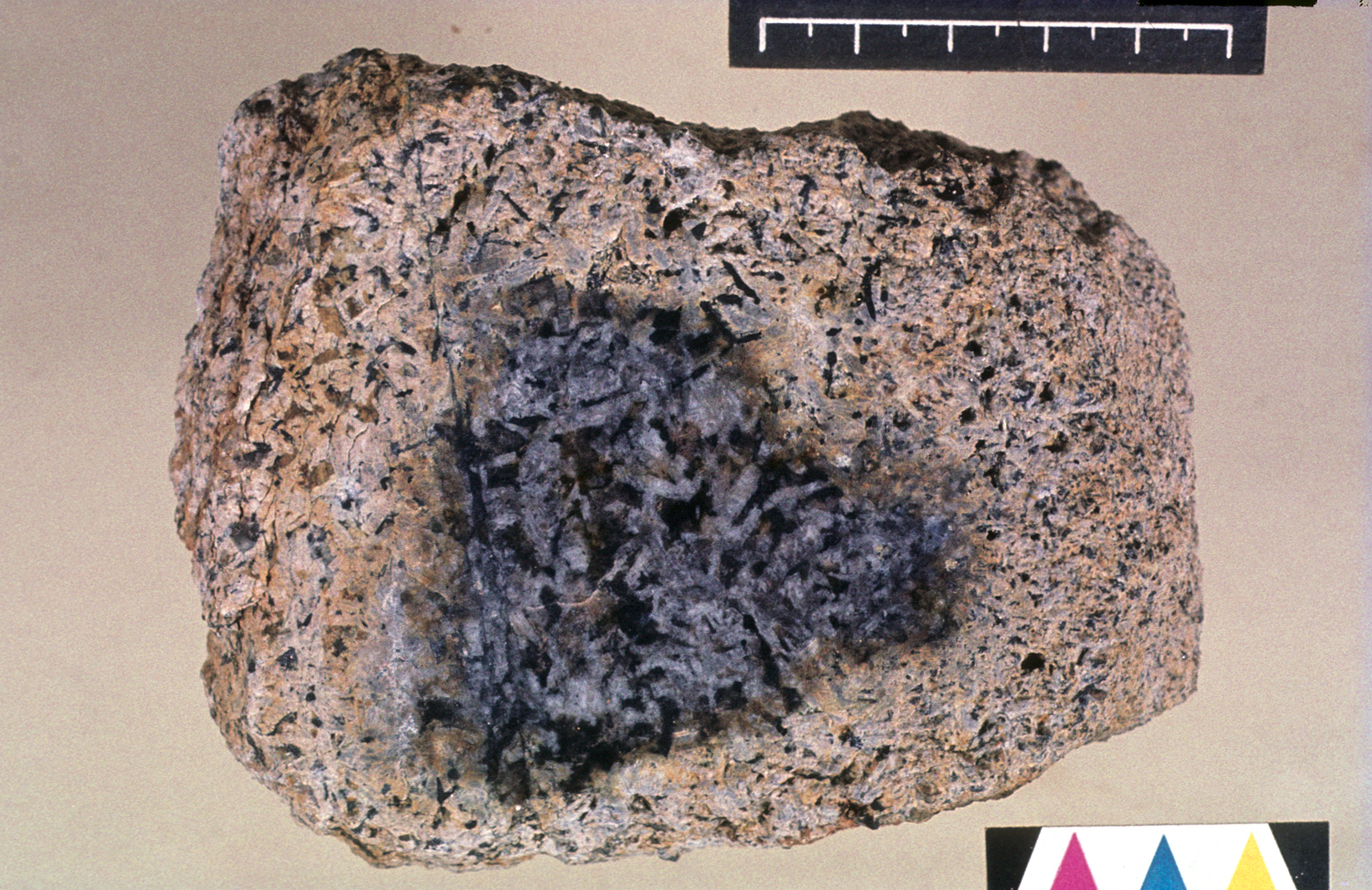
Bauxite with core of unweathered rock

Numerous classification schemes have been proposed for bauxite but, as of 1982, there was no general agreement.

Vadász (1951) distinguished lateritic bauxites (silicate bauxites) from karst bauxite ores (carbonate bauxites):

- The carbonate bauxites occur predominantly in Europe, Guyana, Suriname, and Jamaica above carbonate rocks (limestone and dolomite), where they were formed by lateritic weathering and residual accumulation of intercalated clay layers – dispersed clays which were concentrated as the enclosing limestones gradually dissolved during chemical weathering.
- The lateritic bauxites are found mostly in the countries of the tropics. They were formed by lateritization of various silicate rocks such as granite, gneiss, basalt, syenite, and shale. In comparison with the iron-rich laterites, the formation of bauxites depends even more on intense weathering conditions in a location with very good drainage. This enables the dissolution of the kaolinite and the precipitation of the gibbsite. Zones with highest aluminium content are frequently located below a ferruginous surface layer. The aluminium hydroxide in the lateritic bauxite deposits is almost exclusively gibbsite.

In the case of Jamaica, recent analysis of the soils showed elevated levels of cadmium, suggesting that the bauxite originates from Miocene volcanic ash deposits from episodes of significant volcanism in Central America.

== Production and reserves ==
Bauxite production

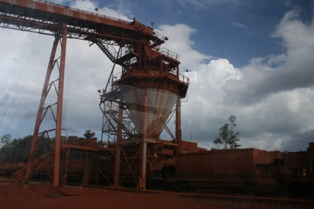
One of the world's largest bauxite mines in Weipa, in northern Queensland, Australia

Guinea is the largest producer of bauxite, followed by Australia and China. Bauxite is usually strip mined because it is almost always found near the surface of the terrain, with little or no overburden. Increased aluminium recycling, which requires less electric power than producing aluminium from ores, may considerably extend the world's bauxite reserves.

== Aluminium production ==
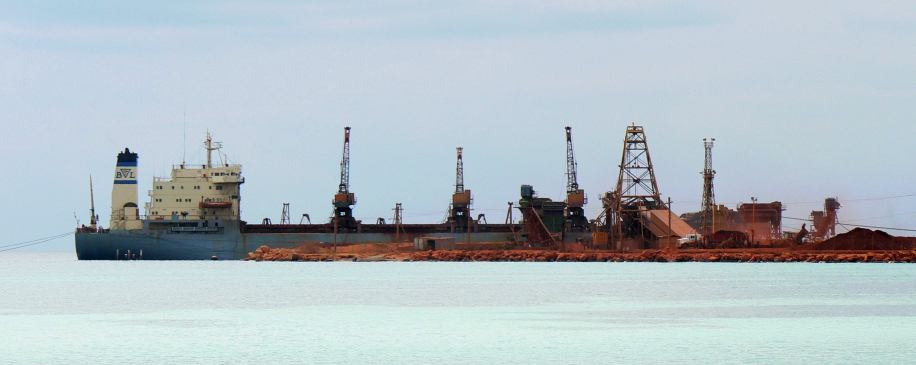
Bauxite being loaded at Cabo Rojo, Dominican Republic, to be shipped elsewhere for processing; 2007

Bauxite being digested by washing with a hot solution of sodium hydroxide at 175 °C (347 °F) under pressure at National Aluminium Company, Nalconagar, India

As of 2010, approximately 70% to 80% of the world's dry bauxite production is processed first into alumina and then into aluminium by electrolysis. Bauxite rocks are typically classified according to their intended commercial application: metallurgical, abrasive, cement, chemical, and refractory.

Bauxite ore is usually heated in a pressure vessel along with a sodium hydroxide solution at a temperature of 150 to 200 °C (300 to 390 °F). At these temperatures, the aluminium is dissolved as sodium aluminate (the Bayer process). The aluminium compounds in the bauxite may be present as gibbsite (Al(OH)_{3}), boehmite (AlOOH) or diaspore (AlOOH); the different forms of the aluminium component will dictate the extraction conditions. The undissolved waste, bauxite tailings, after the aluminium compounds are extracted contains iron oxides, silica, calcia, titania and some un-reacted alumina. After separation of the residue by filtering, pure gibbsite is precipitated when the liquid is cooled, and then seeded with fine-grained aluminium hydroxide. The gibbsite is usually converted into aluminium oxide, Al_{2}O_{3}, by heating in rotary kilns or fluid flash calciners to a temperature in excess of 1,000 °C (1,830 °F). This aluminium oxide is dissolved at a temperature of about 960 °C (1,760 °F) in molten cryolite. Next, this molten substance can yield metallic aluminium by passing an electric current through it in the process of electrolysis, which is called the Hall–Héroult process, named after its American and French discoverers.

Prior to the invention of this process, and prior to the Deville process, aluminium ore was refined by heating ore along with elemental sodium or potassium in a vacuum. The method was complicated and consumed materials that were themselves expensive at that time. This made early elemental aluminium more expensive than gold.

== Maritime safety ==
As a bulk cargo, bauxite is a Group A cargo that may liquefy if excessively moist. Liquefaction and the free surface effect can cause the cargo to shift rapidly inside the hold and make the ship unstable, potentially sinking the ship. One vessel suspected to have been sunk in this way was the MS Bulk Jupiter in 2015. One method which can demonstrate this effect is the "can test", in which a sample of the material is placed in a cylindrical can and struck against a surface many times. If a moist slurry forms in the can, then there is a likelihood for the cargo to liquefy; although conversely, even if the sample remains dry it does not conclusively prove that it will remain that way, or that it is safe for loading.

== Source of gallium ==
Bauxite is the main source of the rare metal gallium.

During the processing of bauxite to alumina in the Bayer process, gallium accumulates in the sodium hydroxide liquor. From this it can be extracted by a variety of methods. The most recent is the use of ion-exchange resin. Achievable extraction efficiencies critically depend on the original concentration in the feed bauxite. At a typical feed concentration of 50 ppm, about 15 percent of the contained gallium is extractable. The remainder reports to the red mud and aluminium hydroxide streams.

Bauxite is also a potential source for vanadium.

== Socio-ecological impacts ==
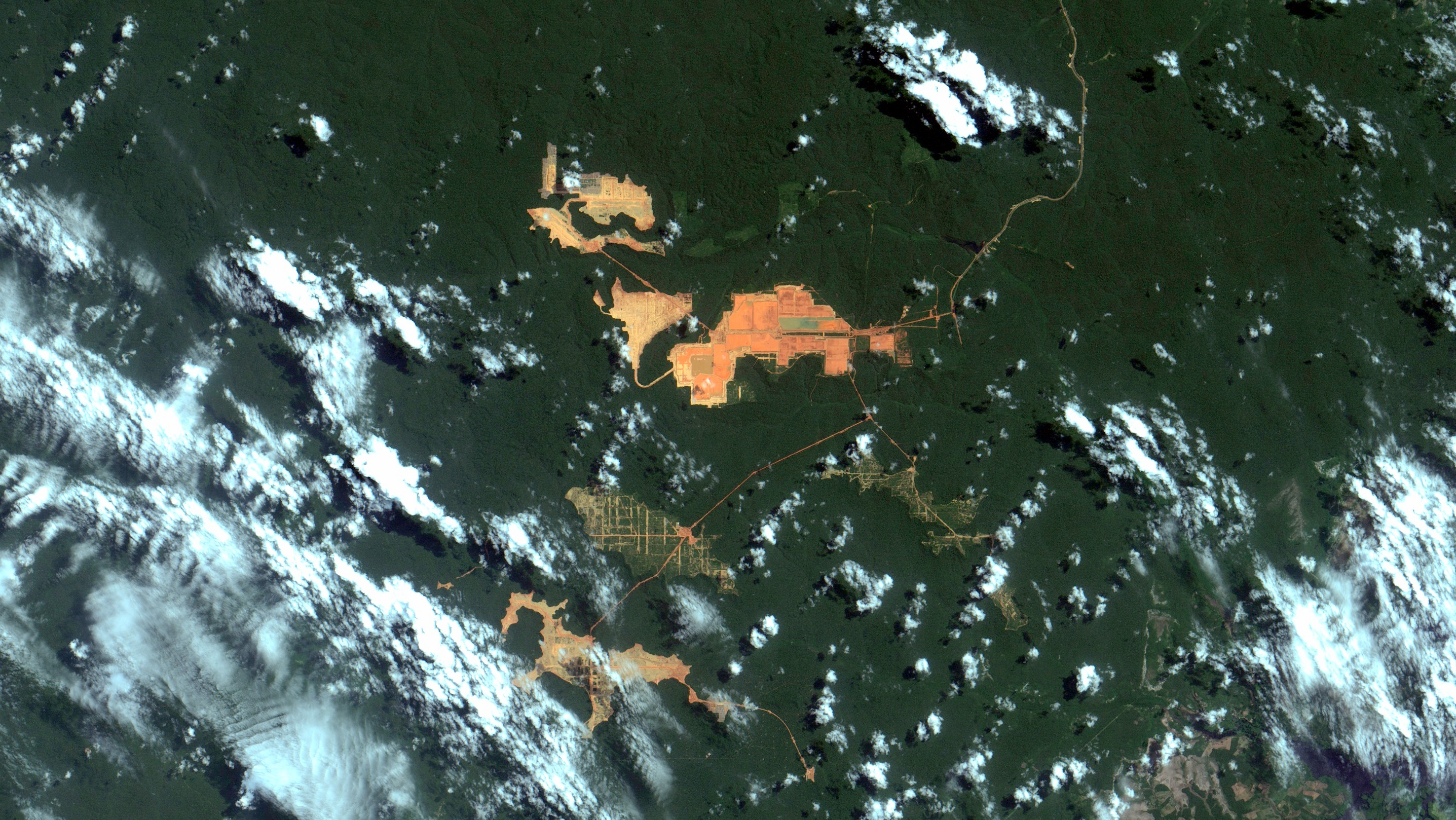
Mineração Rio do Norte (MRN) Bauxite Mine

The social and environmental impacts of bauxite extraction are well documented. Most of the world's bauxite deposits can be found within 1 to 20 metres (3 ft 3 in to 65 ft 7 in) of the Earth's surface. Strip mining is the most common technique used for extracting shallow bauxite. This process involves removing the vegetation, top soil, and overburden to expose the bauxite ore. The overlying soil is typically stockpiled in order to rehabilitate the mine once operations have finished. During the strip mining process, the biodiversity and habitat once present in the area is completely lost and the hydrological and soil characteristics in the region are permanently altered. Other environmental impacts of bauxite mining include soil degradation, air pollution, and water pollution.

=== Red mud ===
Red mud is a highly alkaline sludge, with a high pH around 13, that is a byproduct of the Bayer process. It contains several compounds such as sodium aluminosilicate, calcium titanate, monohydrate aluminium, and trihydrate aluminium that do not break down in nature. When improperly stored, red mud can contaminate soil and water, which can result in local extinction of all life. Red mud was responsible for killing all life in the Marcal River in Hungary after a spill occurred in 2010. When red mud dries, it turns into dust that can cause lung disease, cancer and birth defects.

=== Conflicts ===
In the tropical regions of Asia, central Africa, South America and northern Australia, there has been an increase of bauxite mines on traditional and indigenous lands. This has resulted in a number of negative social impacts on local and indigenous peoples. In the Boké Region of Guinea, there has been a significant increase in bauxite mining pressure on the local population. This has resulted in potable water issues, air pollution, food contamination, and land expropriation disputes due to improper compensation.

Bauxite mining has led to protests, civil unrest, and violent conflicts in Guinea, Ghana, Vietnam, and India.

=== Guinea ===
Guinea has a long history of conflict between local communities and mining companies, as documented in academic research on the country's mining sector. Between 2015 and 2018, the expansion of bauxite mining in the Boké Region sparked 35 conflicts, including protests and road blockades. These disputes have resulted in fatalities, the destruction of heavy machinery, and damage to government buildings.

=== Ghana ===
The Atewa range in Ghana, classified as an ecologically important forest reserve with an area of 17,400 hectares (43,000 acres), has been is a recent site of conflict and controversy surrounding bauxite mining. The forest reserve is one of the only two upland evergreen forests in Ghana, and makes up a significant portion of the remaining 20% of forested habitat left in Ghana. The Atewa range falls under the jurisdiction of Akyem Abuakwa Traditional Area and is overseen by the king known as Okyenhene. In 2013, an NGO called A Rocha Ghana held a summit with the forestry and water resource commission, the minister of lands, the minister of the environment, and other important stakeholders. They came to the conclusion that no future government should mine bauxite in the region because the reserve is environmentally and culturally significant.

In 2016, the government along with NGO's began the process of upgrading the reserved to a national park. However, that year an election took place, and before it became official, the newly elected National Patriotic Party (NPP) rejected the plan. In 2017, the government of Ghana signed a Memorandum of Understanding with China to develop new bauxite mining infrastructure in Ghana. Although there was no official plan to mine the Atewa Forest Reserve, tensions between local communities, NGO and the government began to rise. In 2019, tensions began to reach a peak when the government presented the Ghana Integrated Bauxite and Aluminium Development Authority Act that would create the legal framework required to develop and establish an integrated bauxite industry. In May of that year, the government began drilling deep holes in the reserve.

These actions sparked several protests, including a 95-kilometre (59 mi) march from the reserve to the presidential palace, an informational billboard campaign led by A Rocha Ghana, and a youth march. In 2020, A Rocha Ghana also sued the government over the drilling in the reserve after they failed to provide a statement explaining their actions.

=== Vietnam ===
In early 2009, the Vietnamese Government proposed a plan to mine remote regions of the central highlands. This proposal was highly controversial and sparked a nationwide debate and the most significant domestic conflict since the Vietnam War. Government scientists, journalists, religious leaders, retired high level state officials, and General Võ Nguyên Giáp, the military leader of Vietnam's anti-colonial revolution, were among the many people across Vietnamese society who opposed the government's plans. In an attempt to stop the spread of information across the globe, the government banned domestic reporters from reporting on bauxite mining. However, reporters turned to Vietnamese language websites and blogs where the reporting and discussion continued.

On April 12, 2009, several well-respected Vietnamese scholars started a petition against the mining of bauxite that was signed by 135 accomplished and well known "Intellectuals". This petition helped unite the scattered anti-bauxite movement into a unified opposition against the state. These acts of governmental defiance were met with repressive state actions. Many domestic online reporters were arrested, and legislative action was taken to repress scientific research.

=== India ===
Most of India's bauxite ore reserves, which are among the top ten largest in the world, are located on tribal land. These tribal lands are densely populated and home to over 100 million Indigenous Indian peoples. The mountain summits located on these lands act as a source of water and greatly contribute to the regions fertility. The Indian bauxite industry is interested in developing this land for aluminium production, which poses great risk to the terrestrial and aquatic ecosystems. Historically, the Indigenous peoples living on these lands have shown resistance to development, and oppose any new bauxite mining projects in the area. This has led to violent conflicts between Indigenous communities and police. On December 16, 2000, police killed three Indigenous protestors and wounded over a dozen more during a protest over a bauxite project in the Rayagada district of Odisha.

== See also ==
- Bauxite, Arkansas
- Rio Tinto Alcan
- United Company RUSAL
- MS Bulk Jupiter
