= Jaha (surname) =

Jaha is a surname. Notable people and fictional characters with the surname include:

== Real people ==
- Ahmadu Usman Jaha, Nigerian politician
- Arijana Jaha, Bosnia and Herzegovina judoka
- Cyril VIII Jaha (1840–1916), Syrian clergyman
- John Jaha (born 1966), American baseball player
- Sali Jaha (1803–1883), Albanian military and freedom fighter

== Fictional characters ==
- Thelonious Jaha, in the American science fiction drama The 100

- Wells Jaha, son of Thelonious Jaha
