= Gearbulk =

Swiss shipping company

Gearbulk Holding Limited
- Company type: Private
- Industry: Ship transport
- Founded: 1968; 58 years ago
- Headquarters: Hamilton, Bermuda
- Key people: Kristian Gerhard Jebsen
- Owner: Mitsui O.S.K. Lines; (2025–present)
- Number of employees: 600 office staff worldwide 3000 operational and seafaring staff
- Website: http://www.gearbulk.com/

Gearbulk Holding Ltd. is an international shipping company that operates the world's largest fleet of open hatch gantry and semi-open jib craned vessels. These vessels specialise in carrying unitised breakbulk cargoes like forest products, non-ferrous metals, and steel.

Headquartered in Pfäffikon, Switzerland, it also has a revenue stream in terminal operations. Founded by Kristian Gerhard Jebsen of Bergen, Norway in 1968, it took over the Dublin Shipping company thirty years later.

In January 2025, it was announced that Japan-based group MOL (Mitsui O.S.K. Lines) had completed the purchase of a majority stake (72%) in Gearbulk.

== Fleet ==
As of October 2014, the Gearbulk fleet consisted of 64 vessels, most of which were "open hatch gantry craned (OHGC)" vessels. Standardising on this design makes the vessels interchangeable, and offers operational flexibility. Gearbulk also operates open hatch jib craned (Fleximax) vessels and several bulk carriers for general bulk cargoes.

On 2 January 2015, the MS Bulk Jupiter sank off the coast of Vũng Tàu, Vietnam.

== List of ships ==
This is a dynamic list and may never be able to satisfy particular standards for completeness. You can help by expanding it with reliably sourced entries.

- Ibis Arrow (4th generation juice carrier)
- Aracari Arrow
- Jacamar Arrow
- Quetzal Arrow
- Hawk Arrow
- Jaegar Arrow
- Emu Arrow
- Kite Arrow
- Grebe Arrow
- Mandarin Arrow
- Merline Arrow
- Penguin Arrow
- Plover Arrow
- Toucan Arrow
- Weaver Arrow
- Corella Arrow
- Macuru Arrow
- Tenca Arrow
- Tuju Arrow
- Canelo Arrow
- Cedar Arrow
- Pine Arrow
- Poplar Arrow
