= Dale of Norway =

Norwegian clothing company

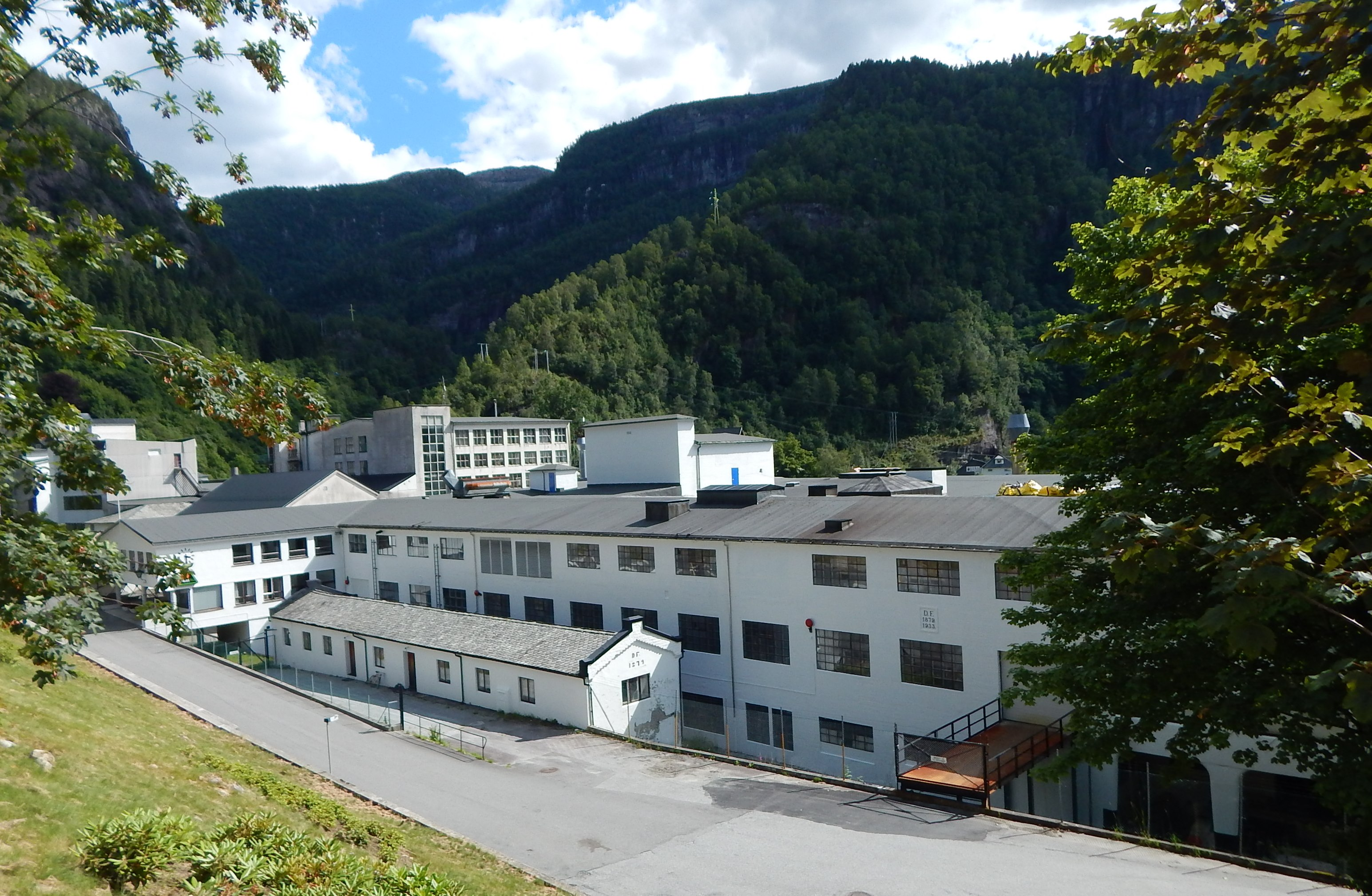
Dale of Norway facilities

Dale of Norway is a Norwegian clothing brand known for their production of high-quality pure wool knitwear. The textile factory for the company is located at the village of Dale in Vaksdal Municipality, about 50 kilometres (31 mi) east of the city of Bergen in Vestland county, Norway. In 2018, Dale of Norway was acquired by the Rossignol Group.

== History ==
The history of the business dates to 1872 when industrialist Peter Jebsen (1824–1892) first established a textile factory in Dale. The textile facility was completed in 1879. Starting in 1912, the operation included the production of hand-knitted yarn. After World War II, the factory developed exports of its knitted sweaters.

Since 1956, Dale of Norway has designed and produced official Olympic and World Championship sweaters for the Norwegian National Alpine Ski Team, with new designs for every event. Dale of Norway was later chosen to design the official sweaters for the Winter Olympic Games through the International Olympic Committee (IOC), with the rights to use the Olympic symbols.
