= Kristian Gerhard Jebsen =

Norwegian businessman (1927–2004)

Kristian Gerhard Jebsen (27 May 1927 – 19 February 2004) was a Norwegian ship-owner.

He was born in Bergen as a son of ship-owner Kristian Jebsen (1901–1967) and Sissi Kjerland (1904–1993). He was a great-grandson of factory owner and ship-owner Peter Jebsen, grandson of Kristian Gerhard Sundt Jebsen and grandnephew of Gustav Adolf Jebsen. He was also a brother of Atle Jebsen. In 1953 he married Aud Munkeberg, born 1931.

He finished his secondary education in 1944, and after the Second World War he worked for the Allied United Maritime Authority in London until 1946. He then studied at Columbia University until 1948 when he took the bachelor's degree in Business Administration. He worked in New York and London before being hired in the family company Kristian Jebsens Rederi in 1953. He was a board member from 1957. A disagreement developed between Kristian Gerhard Jebsen, his father and his brother, and in 1967 Kristian Gerhard Jebsen founded a new company, Kristian Gerhard Jebsens Skipsrederi. In 1968 he founded Gearbulk as a cooperation between his company and three others.

Kristian Gerhard Jebsen moved back to Great Britain in 1993 and died in London in February 2004.
