= Back to Back Theatre =

Australian theatre company

Back to Back Theatre is an Australian theater company that engages with disabilities on stage. The company is based in Geelong, Victoria. It creates its work nationally and tours around the world.

The company originated in 1987, and a year later its first performance Big Bag was put on stage.

The ensemble currently consists of six actors, all of whom are neurodivergent or disabled. As of May 2022, the Back to Back ensemble is: Simon Laherty, Sarah Mainwaring, Scott Price, Mark Deans, and Breanna Deleo.

Back to Back Theatre gained international attention in 2007 after touring with small metal objects and winning a Green Room Award. Another play Ganesh versus the Third Reich revolved around ideas of eugenics and Nazism and received a Helpmann award after its first performance in 2012. In 2019, the company also engaged in some film work creating Oddlands, a 28-minute pilot for TV that will grow into a six-part series.

In 2013, Back to Back Theatre published a book We're People Who Do Shows ― Back to Back Theatre Performance, Politics, Visibility that expanded on the company's artistic vision, process, and history.

The company's film Shadow was showcased at the Sydney Film Festival in 2022.

== Awards ==
- Golden Lion for Lifetime Achievement (2024)
- International Ibsen Award (2022)
- Sidney Myer Performing Arts Awards - Group Award (2005)
- Green Room Award Best Ensemble Performance in Alternative & Hybrid Performance (2012)(2012)
- Helpmann Award for Best Play (2012)
- Bessie Award, New York (2008)
