= Stephen Jepson =

Potter

Stephen Jepson is a noted American ceramic artist and teacher — also widely known for developing a personal athletics program called Never Leave The Playground.

Though formally retired from his ceramics career, Jepson continues to teach pottery — and has dedicated himself to his athletics program.

== Background ==
Born Stephen Michael Jepson on May 31, 1941, in Sioux City, Iowa, Jepson received a Bachelor of Science Degree at Truman University 1969 as well as a MFA from Alfred University in 1971> He subsequently opened his studio in Geneva, Florida, and began the ceramics department at the University of Central Florida, where he taught for eight years.

In 1976, one of his pieces, Jar with Lid, was selected for the Smithsonian Museum Collection of American Crafts.

In 1978, Jepson was profiled in The Professional Potter by Thomas Shafer.

In 1993, he founded the video production company, Thoughtful Productions, making instructional videos to teach intermediate and beginner potters how to improve their technique, and in 1997, he founded The World Pottery Institute in Geneva, Florida, a school for potters.

== Ceramics ==
Jepson has taught ceramics at Valencia Community College and at the University of Central Florida — and has conducted workshops and seminars, including at Wooster College, Miami Ceramic League, Arrowmont School of Crafts, Santa Fe Community College, and the National Council for Education in Ceramic Art.

He has participated in numerous one-man, group and competitive shows, including the American Hand, Washington, D.C.;Functional Ceramics, Wooster, Ohio; Indianapolis Museum, Indianapolis, Indiana; Wichita National; Crafts National; National Teapot Invitational; Cedar Creek Gallery Invitational; National Pitcher Invitational, West Virginia University; University of Central Florida Invitational; and at Complex Gallery, Knoxville, Tennessee.

He has received awards at art festivals, including at the Winter Park Art Festival, Winter Park, Florida; Las Olas Boulevard Art Festival, For Lauderdale, Florida; Coconut Grove Art Festival, Coconut Grove, Florida; Ringling Museum Art Festival, Sarasota, Florida; Ormond Beach Art Festival, Ormond Beach, Florida; Gasparilla Art Festival, Tampa, Florida; DeLand Art Festival, DeLand, Florida; and at the Virginia Beach Art Festival, Virginia Beach, Virginia.

== Never Leave The Playground ==
Jepson created, and maintains the website Never Leave The Playground, a program to stimulates the brain and body by training the hands and feet, and thereby promote good health — with an emphasis on having fun.

Jepson has noted that people believe exercise is strenuous, where his method is neither arduous nor boring, focusing on movement and games, similar to children's playground activities

He begins with simple movements and progresses to more complex challenges, e.g., training left and right hands and feet to manipulate large and small objects with increasing precision. The movements promote balance and dexterity while increasing eye/hand coordination — developing large and small muscle groups to foster stability and physical coordination.

Jepson has noted that "every cell in the body is affected by movement. The brain improves as we use our muscles, which, in turn grow, with use. Scientific studies show that physical movement is the single most important thing to do to be physically healthier and smarter, regardless of age. Movement training can prevent or delay the onset of Alzheimer's and dementia. Neural pathways open and increase throughout our lives as we learn new activities."
