= Benjamin Jepson =

American music teacher (1832–1914)

Benjamin Jepson (1832 – 1914) was one of the first primary school music teachers in the United States, and introduced music to the public schools of New Haven, Connecticut, in 1865. The Benjamin Jepson Interdistrict Magnet School and the Jepson School are named after him.
