= Joanna Jepson =

British Anglican priest and campaigner (born 1976)

The Rev. Joanna Jepson
- Rev. Joanna Jepson
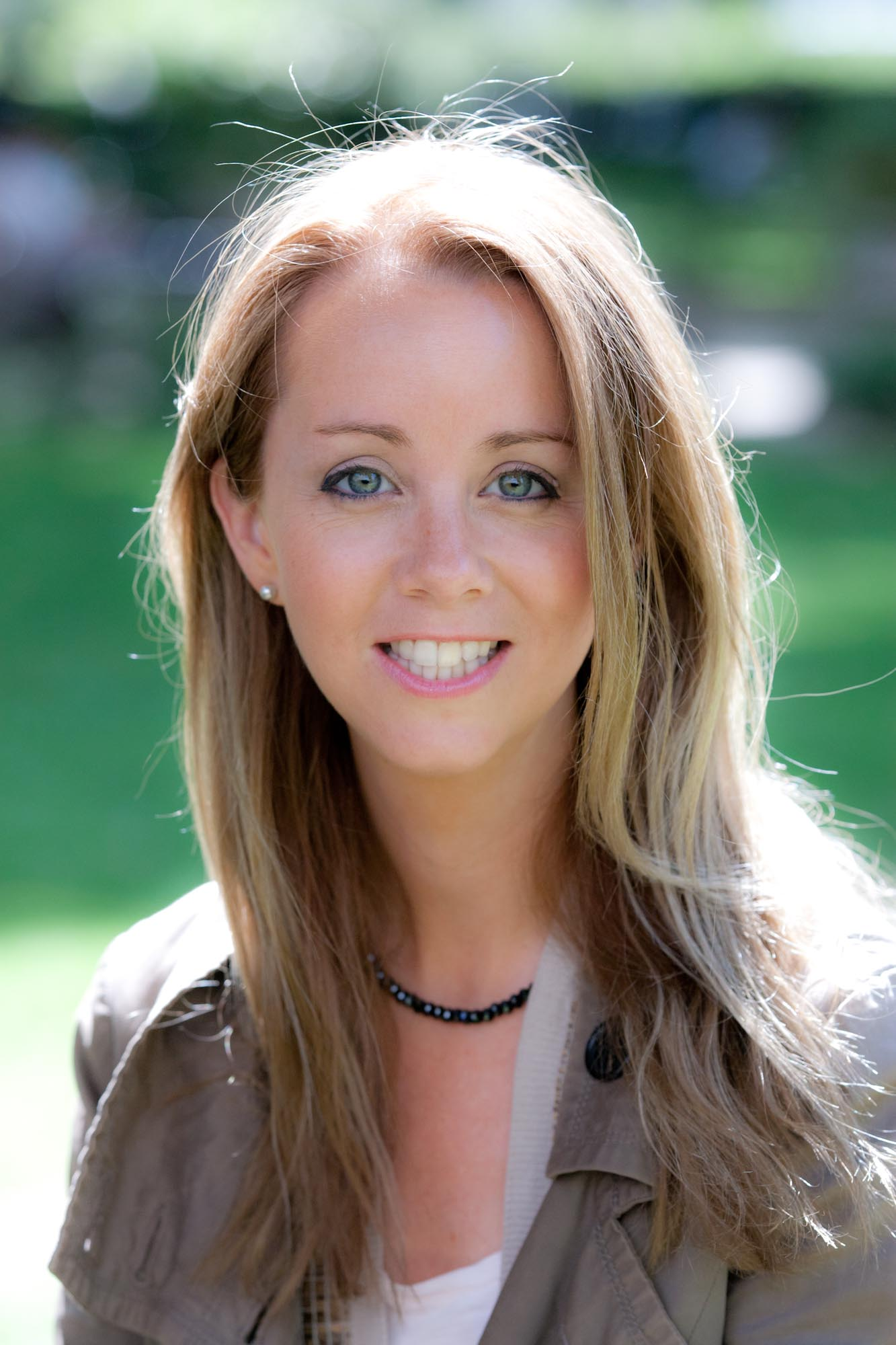
- The Rev. Joanna Jepson
- Church: Church of England
- Diocese: Diocese of Chester

Orders
- Ordination: 2004

Personal details
- Born: 1976 (age 49–50)

Joanna Elizabeth Jepson (born 1976) is a British Anglican priest and campaigner. She is most notable for instigating a legal challenge to the late abortion of a 28-week-old foetus in 2001. The reasons given for the termination were associated with the fetus having a cleft lip and palate – grounds which Jepson argued did not constitute "a serious handicap" under the terms of the 1967 UK Abortion Act.

Jepson, who was born with a jaw deformity herself, and whose brother is disabled, argued that the abortion was an "unlawful killing". However, in 2005 a judicial review concluded that the doctors carrying out the abortion had "acted in good faith", and would not face prosecution.

== Childhood ==
Jepson was born with a congenital jaw deformity – her top jaw stuck out by eight millimetres and her lower jaw hung down into her neck. This resulted in a deformed appearance which she herself described made her look "like a chipmunk". She was forced to wait until her late teens before she could have reconstructive surgery, as it was necessary to wait until her facial and jaw bones had stopped growing.

Between 1991 and 1993 she underwent corrective operations to correct her jaw defect. These operations involved removing bone from her upper jaw, breaking and resetting her lower jaw, and a sliding genioplasty. The process was highly traumatic and involved Intensive Care treatment in hospital, a lengthy period of swelling, and having her jaw wired.

Jepson believes that this gave her an insight into human nature – she was bullied because of her appearance at school, but became part of "the pretty, popular crowd" at university, after her reconstructive surgery. Her feelings about this change, as well as those brought up by the attitudes of other people she met after surgery, influenced her interest in a much-publicised trial following the abortion of a fetus in December 2001.

== The case ==
The abortion of the 28-week-old foetus was carried out in December 2001 in Herefordshire by doctors who cannot be named for legal reasons. Under the terms of the 1967 UK Abortion Act, abortions after 24 weeks (such as this one) should only be carried out if "there is a substantial risk that if the child was born it would suffer from such physical or mental abnormalities as to be seriously handicapped".

Jepson argued that a cleft palate or lip did not meet this definition – citing the fact that she herself had more serious facial deformities, and that many people born with cleft palates have had perfectly satisfactory corrective operations. As a consequence, she considered this a case of 'unlawful killing', and mounted a legal challenge. Between 1995 and late 2003, 26 abortions on fetuses with cleft palates took place in the United Kingdom, two of which are believed to have taken place after 24 weeks.

Additionally, there is no legal definition of "seriously handicapped" – it is left to the discretion of medical personnel. Mrs. Jepson believes that applying the above reasoning to her own situation, "the law is saying there are good reasons why I should not be alive".

The result of the legal challenge was that Jepson's complaint was not upheld, the Crown Prosecution Service stating that the doctors involved acted in good faith and would not face criminal charges.

A spokesperson for the pro-choice group Abortion Rights stated that they welcomed the decision. Cleft palate can lead to severe disability and the doctors are believed to have acted on those grounds. A ProLife Alliance spokesperson expressed concern at the verdict, commenting on the "eugenic mentality in medicine in the UK".

Jepson said that "People only see the negative side of disability". She also expressed her difficulty dealing with the fact that pregnant mothers in the UK are screened for Down syndrome – a condition which Jepson's brother has. Diagnosis of Down syndrome in the foetus is one of the most common reason given for abortion of fetuses in the UK, and it is feared that screening for this will lead to more abortions.

Jepson expressed a desire to raise the profile of the issues associated with the case, and to see a tightening of the law so that "abortions do not take place for trivial reasons and women are not traumatised".

== Ordained ministry ==
From 2001 to 2003, Jepson trained for ordained ministry at Ridley Hall, Cambridge, an evangelical Anglican theological college. She was ordained in the Church of England as a deacon in 2003 and as a priest in 2004. She served her curacy at St Michael's Church, Plas Newton, Chester in the Diocese of Chester from 2003 to 2006.

In 2006, Jepson was appointed Chaplain at The London College of Fashion, as the institution celebrated its centenary. She stated that she was looking forward to meeting the challenges associated with the role, such as the ethical and political issues associated with fashion, and its "hedonistic image". She voiced her amazement that, in view of the fashion industry's impact on society, the involvement of the Church had been so little. "It is just as important to work in a cultural community as a parish community". She was additionally the honorary priest-in-charge of St Peter's Church, Fulham in the Diocese of London between 2006 and 2009.

Having left the London College of Fashion in 2011, Jepson held permission to officiate in the Diocese of Portsmouth from 2012 to 2013. Since 2013, she has been a chaplain to the forces in the Royal Army Chaplains' Department, Army Reserve. In 2019 she served alongside 47 Regiment Royal Artillery as Chaplain

== Make Me A Christian ==
In August 2008, Jepson took part in a television series for Channel 4 entitled Make Me A Christian, in which a panel of four Christian leaders, including Jepson, attempted to mentor volunteers who were exploring conversion to Christianity.

After being shown the final cut, Jepson took unsuccessful legal action to have her scenes removed from the programme, on the grounds that the footage had been cut in a sensationalist manner to emphasise issues of sexuality and to present only a fundamentalist version of Christianity.

Calling the final cut "sensational, irresponsible and contrived", Jepson complained, "There was clearly an agenda behind making the programme designed to make Christians look obsessed with people's sex lives and intent on imposing Christian behaviour on everyone else. Christian behaviour is only possible after a spiritual transformation. We were encouraged to take part on the understanding that we were dealing with a group of people who genuinely wanted to embrace Christianity. But that was clearly not the case".

== Personal life ==
Jepson married the Revd Canon Nicholas Biddle, a Canon and Precentor of Wells Cathedral; they both use the name "Jepson-Biddle". They have a son, Raphael, born in 2013. Jepson's great-great-grandmother is Dame Catherine Hunt, her great-aunt is Elizabeth Inglis, and her cousin is the actress Sigourney Weaver.

== Bibliography ==
- A Lot Like Eve: Fashion, Faith and Fig-Leaves: A Memoir (2015)
