= Jaha Dukureh =

Gambian women's rights activist

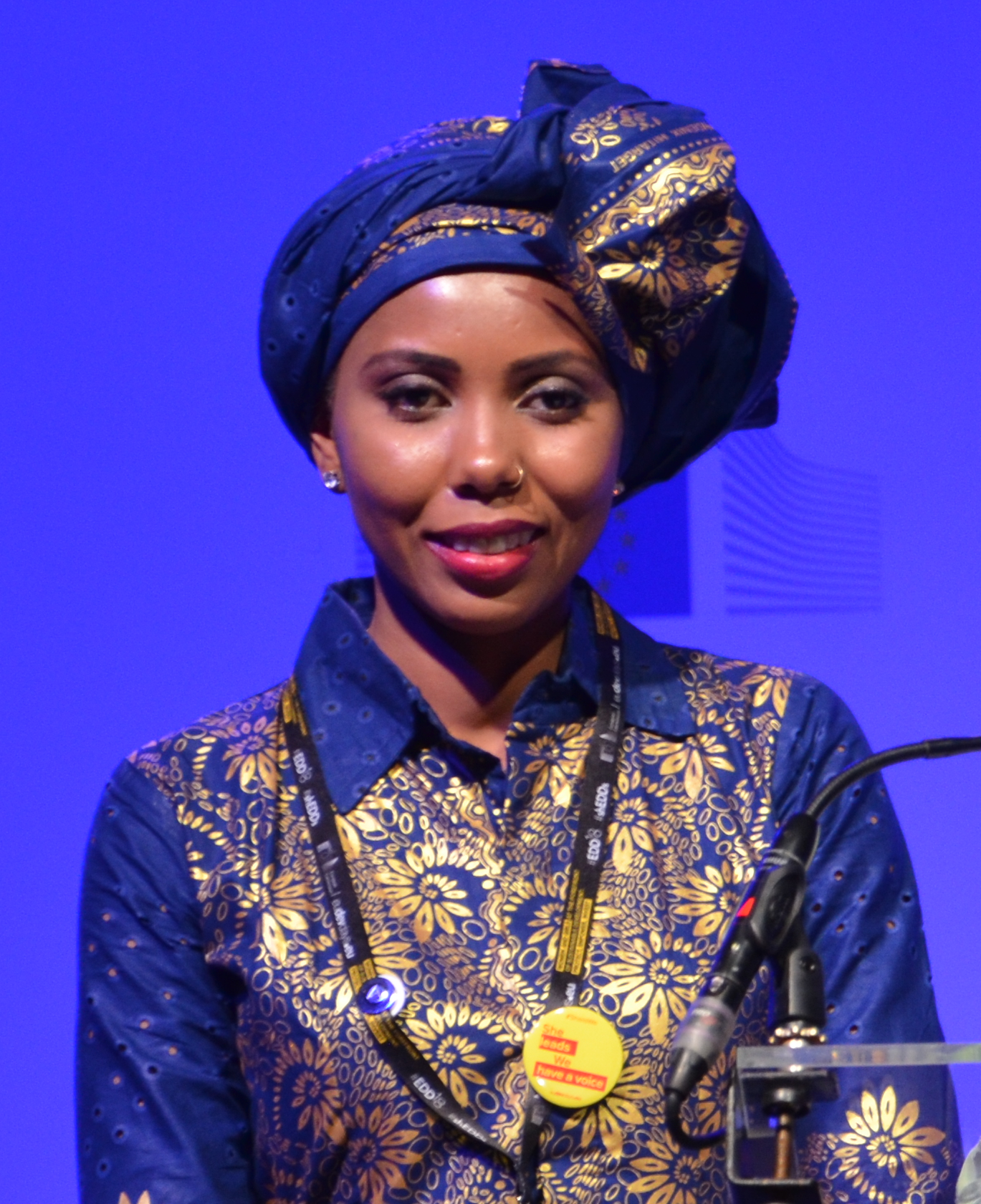
- Dukureh at European Development Days in 2018
- Education: Georgia Southwestern State University, University of Central Florida
- Organization(s): Safe Hands for Girls, UN Women, The Big Sisters Movement, The New Now
- Known for: Female genital mutilation and women's rights activism
- Awards: Nobel Peace Prize nominee, Eleanor Roosevelt Medal of Honour, Time 100 Most Influential People
- Website: safehandsforgirls.org

Jaha Dukureh (born 1989 or 1990) is a Gambian women's right activist and anti-female genital mutilation campaigner. Dukureh was subjected to female genital mutilation in the Gambia when she was a little more than a week old. She is the founder and executive director of Safe Hands for Girls, an organization working to end FGM, and was the lead campaigner in The Guardian's End FGM Guardian Global Media Campaign. In April 2016, she was named to the 2016 Time 100 list. Dukureh was nominated for the Nobel Peace Prize in February 2018, has won the Eleanor Roosevelt Val-Kill Medal, and is a UN Women Goodwill Ambassador for Africa. A feature film about Jaha's life was released by Accidental Pictures and The Guardian. Her memoir, I Will Scream to the World was published by Kensington Books in 2024.

== Life ==
Dukureh was born in The Gambia. She was subjected to Type III female genital mutilation when she was one week old. After her mother's death, she moved to New York City at the age of 15 for an arranged marriage that had been planned years earlier. After experiencing difficulty consummating her marriage, she underwent surgery to undo the infibulation, which she likened to "[going] through the FGM all over again". Dukureh's marriage dissolved and she moved in with family members. She managed to enroll in a New York City high school after being rejected by 10 other schools because she did not have the consent of a legal guardian. At 17, she moved to Atlanta, Georgia, and remarried.

Dukureh earned a Bachelor's degree in business administration management at Georgia Southwestern State University in 2013. That year, she founded Safe Hands for Girls, an anti-FGM non-profit organization. Dukureh became an American citizen in late 2015. Dukureh also has a Master's degree in Non-Profit Management from The University of Central Florida in 2018.

Dukureh's activism led to the banning of female genital mutilation in The Gambia.

Dukureh currently resides in Atlanta. The Guardian developed the documentary film Jaha's Promise, which premiered in 2017.

== 2021 presidential campaign ==
On 13 October 2021, Dukureh announced her bid to stand as a candidate in the 2021 Gambian presidential election for the People's Democratic Organisation for Independence and Socialism, having joined the party in March 2021. Dukureh's campaign was ultimately unsuccessful, with Halifa Sallah being selected to stand as the PDOIS candidate in November 2021.
