= Ebsen =

Ebsen is a surname. Notable people with the surname include:

- Buddy Ebsen (1908–2003), American actor and dancer
- John Ebsen (born 1988), Danish cyclist
- Kiki Ebsen (born 1958), American musician
- Vilma Ebsen (1910–2007), American actress and dancer, brother of Buddy

== See also ==
- Ibsen (name)
