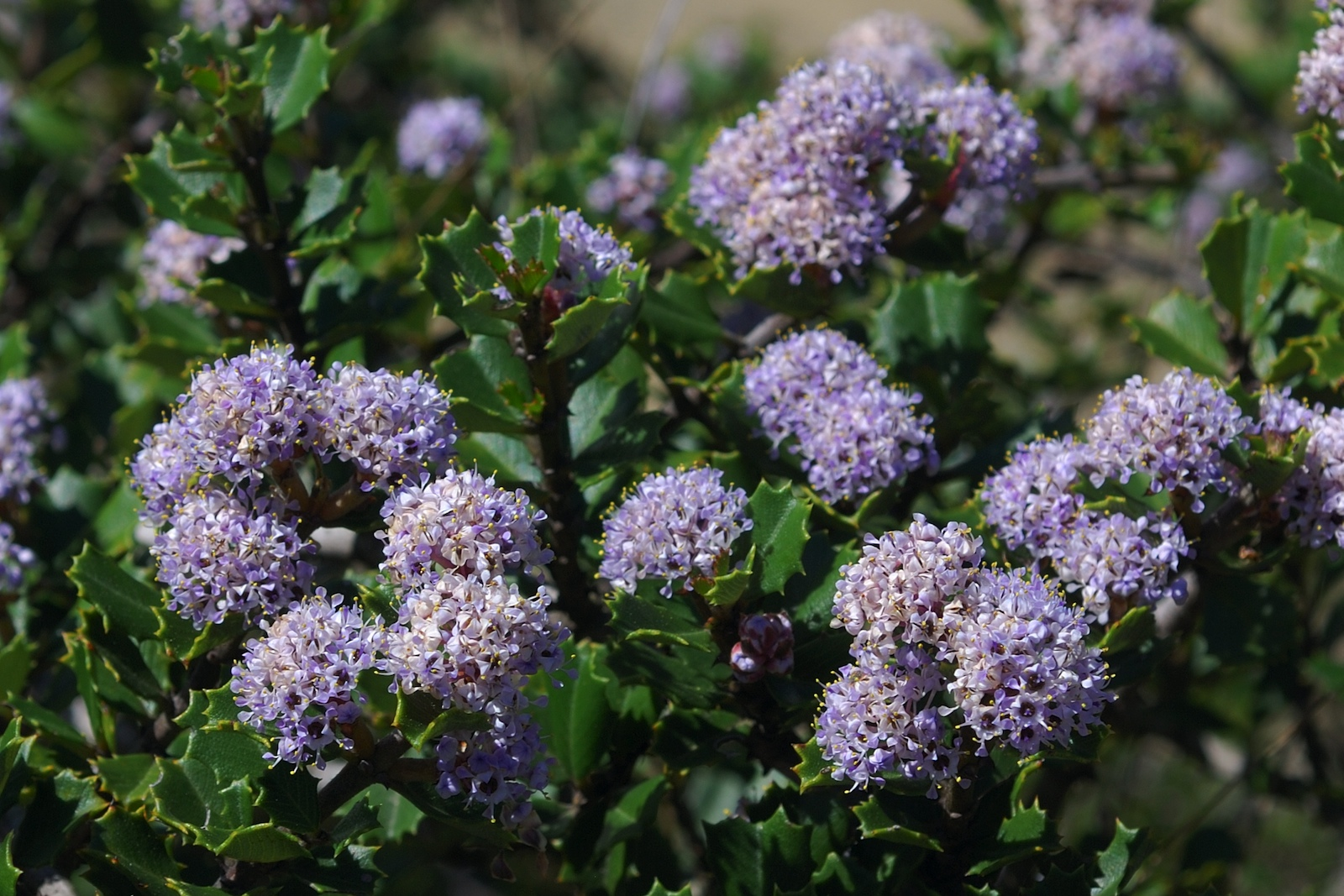

Conservation status
- Vulnerable (NatureServe)

Scientific classification
- Kingdom: Plantae
- Clade: Tracheophytes
- Clade: Angiosperms
- Clade: Eudicots
- Clade: Rosids
- Order: Rosales
- Family: Rhamnaceae
- Genus: Ceanothus
- Species: C. jepsonii

Binomial name
- Ceanothus jepsonii Greene

= Ceanothus jepsonii =

Species of tree

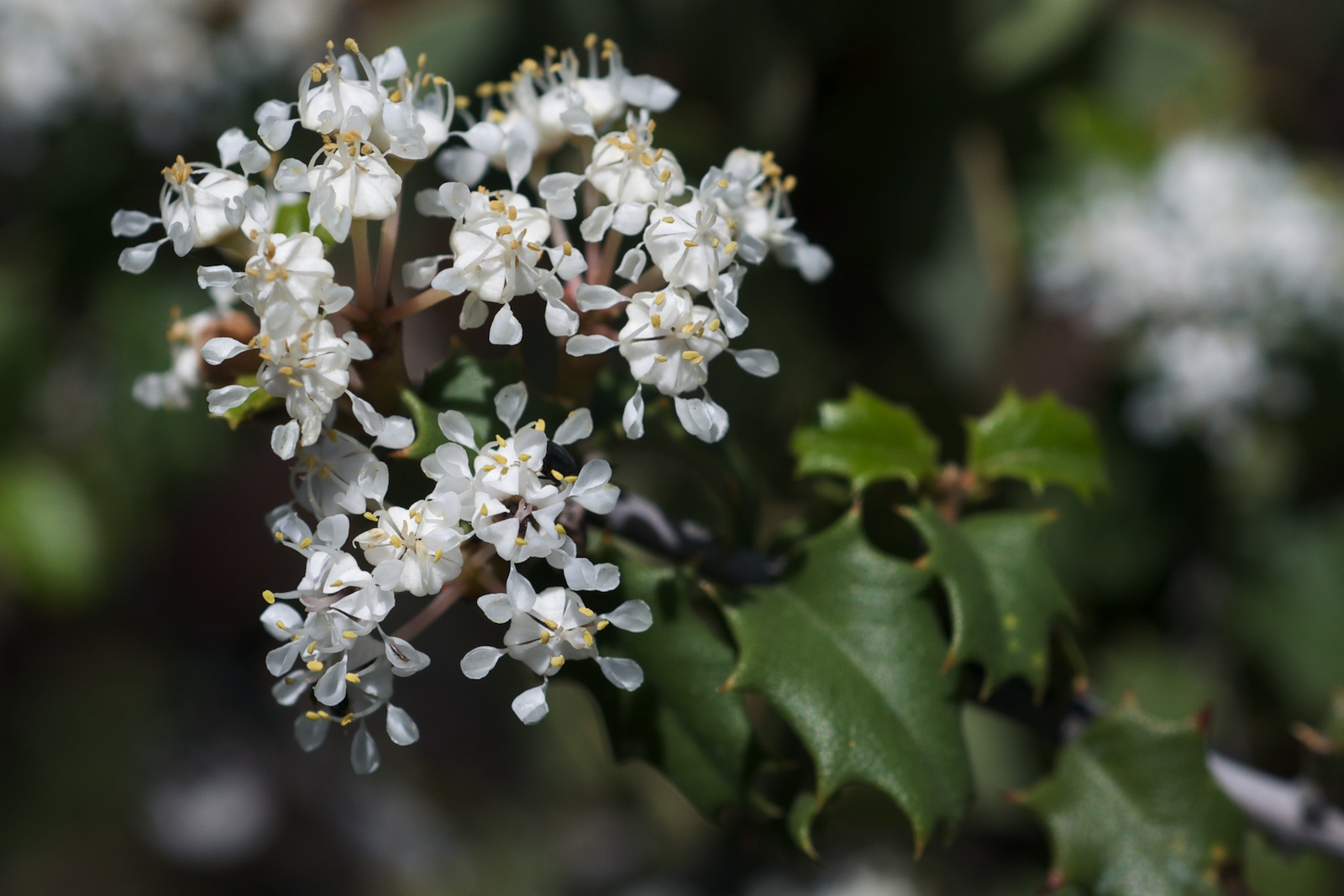
Ceanothus jepsonii 'albiflorus'

Ceanothus jepsonii is a species of shrub in the family Rhamnaceae known by the common names musk brush and Jepson ceanothus.

== Description ==
This species of shrub is variable, particularly across its two varieties:

- Ceanothus jepsonii var. jepsonii is a spreading plant growing up to about half a meter tall. It bears inflorescences of blue or purple flowers and spherical fruits.
- Ceanothus jepsonii var. albiflorus is a white-flowered variety approaching a meter in maximum height. Its fruits are more oblong.

Both varieties have firm, toothed evergreen leaves oppositely arranged, curved, often spiny (holly-like), and with their edges turned under. The flowers tend to have a musky odor.

== Distribution ==
It is endemic to California, where it grows in dry, shrubby habitat in the San Francisco Bay Area and the Coast Ranges to the north, often on serpentine soils.
