= Galium jepsonii =

Jepson's bedstraw

Scientific classification
- Kingdom: Plantae
- Clade: Tracheophytes
- Clade: Angiosperms
- Clade: Eudicots
- Clade: Asterids
- Order: Gentianales
- Family: Rubiaceae
- Genus: Galium
- Species: G. jepsonii

Binomial name
- Galium jepsonii Hilend & J.T.Howell

Synonyms
- Galium angustifolium Nutt. ex A. Gray var. subglabrum Jeps

Species of flowering plant

Galium jepsonii, with the common name Jepson's bedstraw, is a rare flowering plant species in the Rubiaceae — Madder family.

The species name honors renowned California botanist Willis Linn Jepson.

== Distribution ==
The plant is endemic to Southern California, native to open Red fir forest habitats in the Eastern Transverse Ranges. It is found in the San Bernardino Mountains and San Gabriel Mountains, within Los Angeles County and San Bernardino County.

It grows form 2,000–2,500 metres (6,600–8,200 ft) in elevation.

== Description ==
Galium jepsonii is a perennial herb, growing in small erect clumps from 8–16 centimetres (3.1–6.3 in) in size. The bell-shaped flowers are white to pink, with a bloom period of July and August. It is dioecious, with male and female flowers on separate plants.

It is a Vulnerable species on the California Native Plant Society Inventory of Rare and Endangered Plants, and is protected within the San Gabriel Mountains National Monument and Angeles National Forest, and the San Bernardino National Forest.

== See also ==
- Endemic flora of California
- Natural history of the Transverse Ranges
