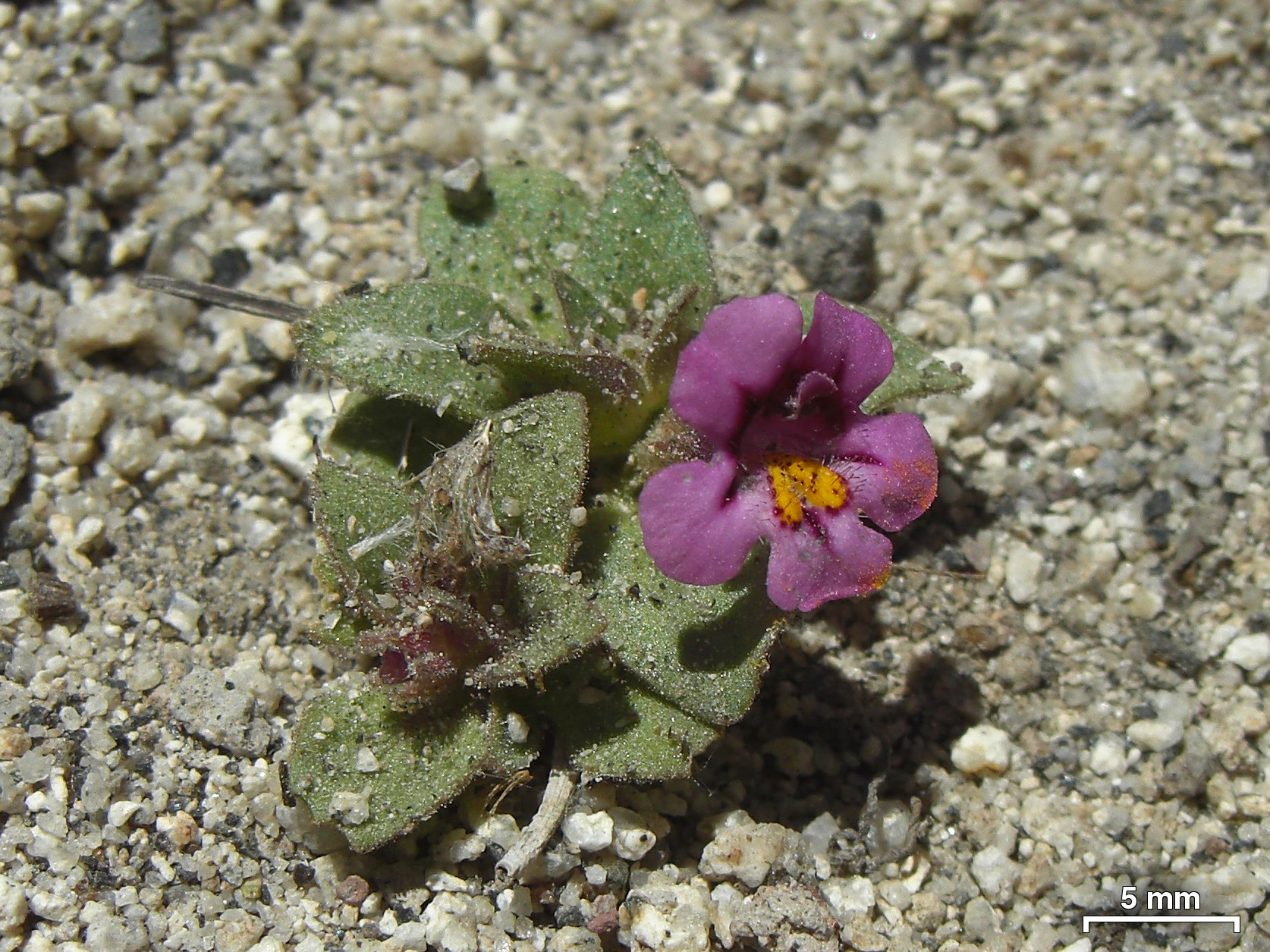
- Diplacus jepsonii at Mount Rose, Nevada

Conservation status
- Apparently Secure (NatureServe)

Scientific classification
- Kingdom: Plantae
- Clade: Embryophytes
- Clade: Tracheophytes
- Clade: Angiosperms
- Clade: Eudicots
- Clade: Asterids
- Order: Lamiales
- Family: Phrymaceae
- Genus: Diplacus
- Species: D. jepsonii

Binomial name
- Diplacus jepsonii (A.L.Grant) G.L.Nesom

Synonyms
- Mimulus jepsonii A.L.Grant; Mimulus microcarpus Pennell; Mimulus nanus var. jepsonii (A.L.Grant) D.M.Thomps.

= Diplacus jepsonii =

Species of flowering plant

Diplacus jepsonii, formerly classified as Mimulus nanus var. jepsonii, is a species of monkeyflower known by the common name Jepson's monkeyflower.

== Description ==
Diplacus jepsonii is an annual herb producing a thin, erect stem up to about 10 centimeters long. The purple-green leaves are linear to oval in shape and up to 1.4 centimeters in length.

The pinkish purple flower is around a centimeter long, its five-lobed mouth with broad yellow strips and purple spotting. The bloom period is May to June.

== Taxonomy ==
This plant is sometimes nearly identical to Diplacus nanus and can be differentiated from it only by close examination of characteristics such as the arrangement of hairs inside the mouth of the flower.

== Distribution and habitat ==
The plant is native to northern California, western Nevada, and southern Oregon in the Sierra Nevada and southern Cascade Range.

It grows in openings of yellow pine forest, red fir forest, and lodgepole forest habitats, at elevations of 1,220–2,380 metres (4,000–7,810 ft).
