= Centre for Ibsen Studies =

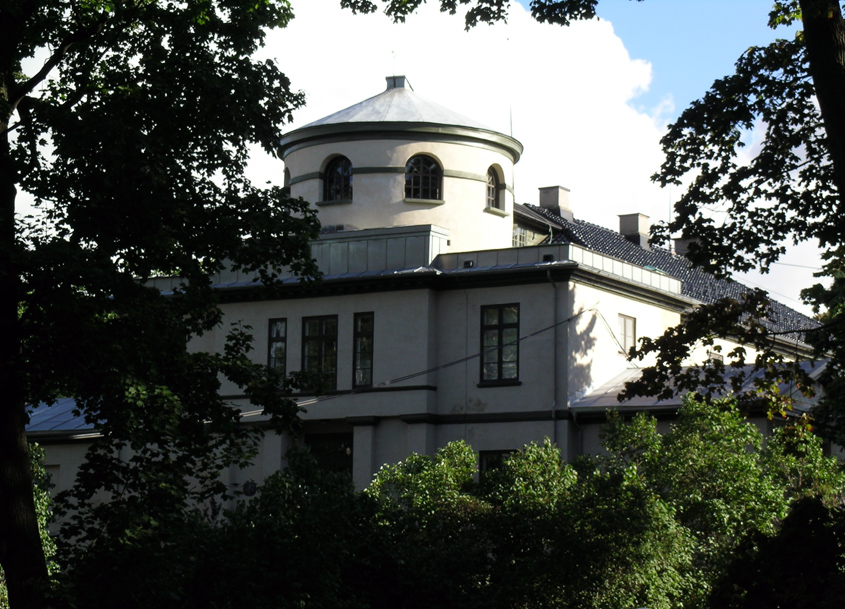
The Centre for Ibsen Studies occupied the Oslo Observatory 2000–2010

The Centre for Ibsen Studies (Norwegian: Senter for Ibsen-studier) at the University of Oslo engages in multidisciplinary research, teaching, and documentation on the nineteenth-century Norwegian playwright Henrik Ibsen.

== History ==
The Centre was established by the university in 1991 and opened in 1993. From 2000 to 2010, the Centre was housed in the Oslo Observatory, the university's oldest building. In January 2010 it moved to Henrik Wergelands hus at the Blindern campus.

Documentation and dissemination of information are key aspects of the Centre’s mission. It holds a library with the world's most complete collection of books and articles relating to Ibsen Studies and maintains The Virtual Ibsen Centre. Research areas include textual studies, performance studies, reception studies, and theatre history. The Centre offers a two-year Master’s programme in Ibsen Studies, as well as a number of courses at Bachelor’s level.

Since 2007 the Centre has arranged an Annual Ibsen Lecture each fall. The Centre for Ibsen Studies also edits the international journal Ibsen Studies, which is published by Taylor & Francis.

== Digital Resources ==
The Centre has developed extensive digital resources that are freely available online at The Virtual Ibsen Center. These resources include:

- IbsenStage, an event-based, relational database containing data on over 20,000 performances from around the globe and from 1850 to the present
- Henrik Ibsen's writings, the authoritative scholarly edition of Ibsen's complete works in the original Norwegian
- The Multilingual Ibsen, open access translations of Ibsen’s works to other languages
- The International Ibsen Bibliography
- a Virtual reality model of Ibsen's first theatre, Komediehuset in Bergen
- an archive of related texts and images, partly from the Ibsen jubilee in 2006 (Ibsennett)
