= Jaha Koo =

South Korean theater creator, composer, and video artist (born 1984)

- 구자하
- Jaha Koo in 2023
- Born: 1984 (age 41–42)
- Education: Korea National University of Arts (BA); Amsterdam University of the Arts (MA)
- Occupations: Theatre maker, composer, video artist
- Notable work: Hamartia Trilogy

Jaha Koo (Korean: 구자하; born 1984) is a Korean theatre maker, composer, and video artist. He is the first Asian and the youngest recipient of the International Ibsen Award. As of 2006, he is active in the Netherlands and Belgium. He is noted for his performances that involve multimedia and technology.

== Biography ==
Jaha Koo was born in South Korea in 1984. He graduated from the School of Drama of the Korea National University of Arts in 2011 and obtained master's degree in contemporary theatre direction from the Amsterdam University of the Arts in 2016.

== Notable works ==
- Haribo Kimchi
  The stage setup is a Korean-style street food vending tent and the play involves food, robots, and video, as well as guests from the audience.
- Hamartia Trilogy
  It was created during 2014–2020. "Hamartia", in Greek tragedy, is a concept translated as "tragic flaw". The trilogy is described by the Ibsen Award Committee as "an insightful long-term exploration of the political landscape, colonial history, and cultural identity of East Asia".
  - Rolling and Rolling (2015)
  The work is about the obsessive attitude to English language in South Korea
  - Cuckoo (2017)
  A humorous conversation with his rice cooker, which exploits the last two decades of the history of Korea, after the major financial crisis in the country, which, among other things, affected the younger generation.
  - The History of Korean Western Theatre (2020)

== Awards ==
- 2017: Young Art Support Amsterdam Award in the music category
- 2026: International Ibsen Award
- 2026: Hong Jin-Ki Creator Award
