= Ahmadu Usman Jaha =

Nigerian politician

Federal Representative
- Constituency: Damboa/Gwoza/Chibok

Personal details
- Born: 2 February 1974 (age 52)
- Party: All Progressive Congress (Nigeria) (APC)
- Occupation: Politician

Ahmadu Usman Jaha is a Nigerian politician. He is currently a member representing Damboa/Gwoza/Chibok Federal Constituency in the House of Representatives.

== Early life ==
Ahmadu Usman Jaha was born on 2 February 1974 and hails from Borno State.

== Political career ==
Prior to his re-election in 2023 as a member of the House of Representatives under the platform of the All Progressives Congress (APC), he was a member of Borno State House of Assembly from 2007 to 2015, and Borno State Commissioner for Higher Education from 2015 to 2018.
