= Stadttheater Bremerhaven =

Theatre in Bremerhaven, Germany

Coordinates: 53.5407°N 8.5813°E

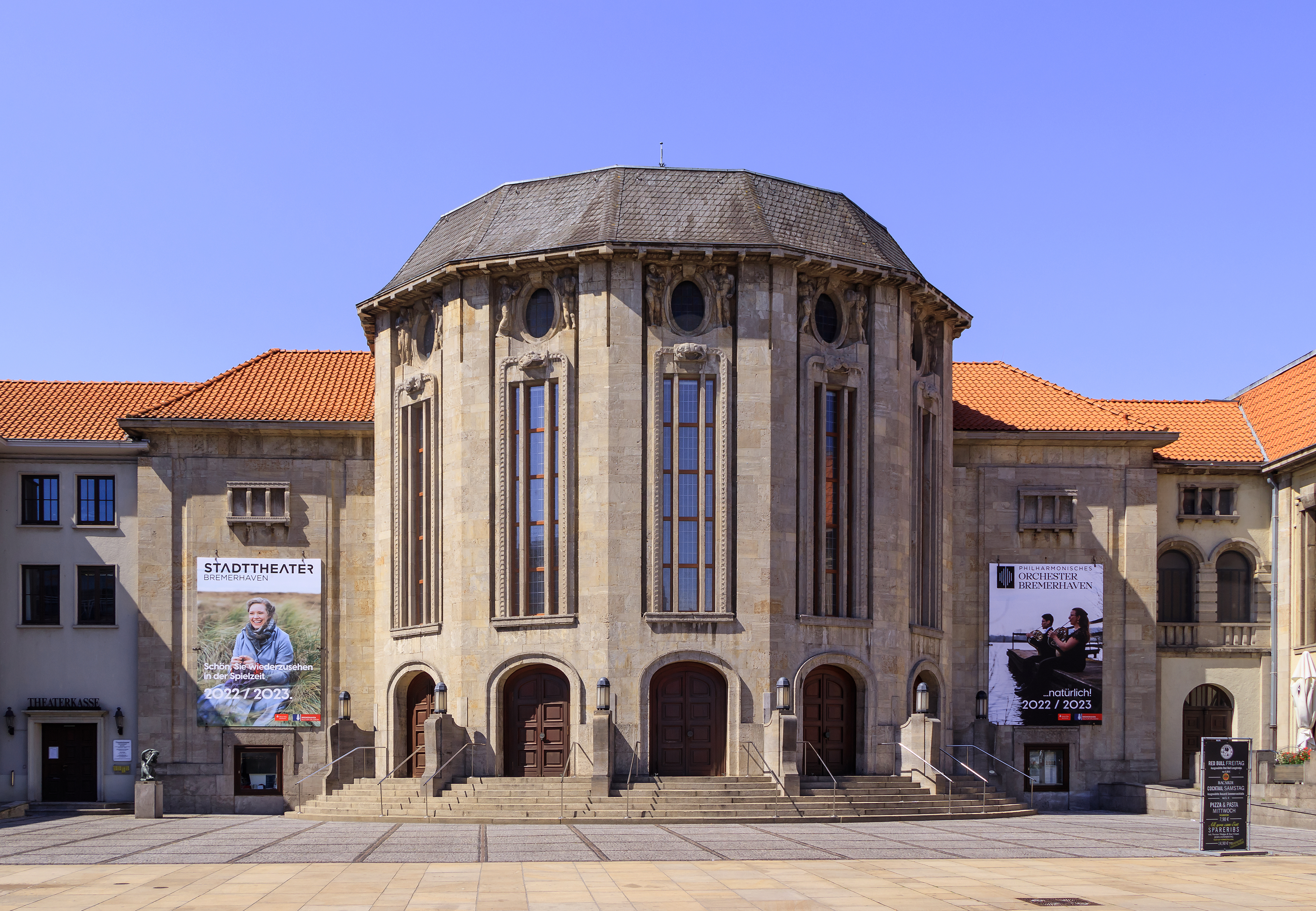
The theatre in 2002

The Stadttheater Bremerhaven (Bremerhaven municipal theatre) is a theatre in Bremerhaven, Germany. Founded in 1867, it serves three genres: opera and other musical theatre, spoken plays, and dance. A theatre built on the present site in 1911 was largely destroyed in World War II; a new house was built in 1952 which incorporated the surviving Jugendstil facade. The smaller Bürgerhaus Lehe, which served as a home before the rebuilding, is currently used as a venue for chamber pieces.

== Literature ==
- Fritz Ernst: Das Bremerhavener Theater – ein Beitrag zu seiner Geschichte von den Anfängen bis zur Wiedererrichtung nach dem 2. Weltkrieg. Stadtarchiv Bremerhaven. Ditzen, Bremerhaven 1981
- Hans-E. Happel: Gesetzt den Fall, wir schliessen das Theater – zur Nachkriegsgeschichte des Stadttheaters Bremerhaven 1945–1988. Nordwestdeutscher Verlag, Bremerhaven 1993, ISBN 3-927-85750-5.
- Stadttheater Bremerhaven: 100 Jahre Stadttheater Bremerhaven – Eine Festschrift. Bremerhaven 1967.
- Stadttheater Bremerhaven: 100 Jahre Oper am Stadttheater Bremerhaven – eine Dokumentation. Bremerhaven 1972.
- Jürgen Dieter Waidelich: 100 Jahre Stadttheater Bremerhaven – eine Festschrift, Nordwestdeutscher Verlag, Bremerhaven 1967.
- Manfred Ernst, Kai Kähler, Wolfgang Denker, Dirk Böttger, Anne Stürzer: Hundert Jahre Stadttheater Bremerhaven. ed.: Stadttheater Bremerhaven; NW-Verlag, Bremerhaven 2011, ISBN 978-3-86918-127-1
- Antje Hansen: Oskar Kaufmann – ein Theaterarchitekt zwischen Tradition und Moderne. Gebr. Mann Verlag, Berlin 2001, ISBN 3-7861-2375-6 (Dissertation at the FU Berlin)
- Festschrift zur Eröffnung des Stadttheaters Bremerhaven Ostern 1952. Ditzen, Bremerhaven 1952.
- Volker Heigenmooser and Heiko Sandelmann: Bremerhaven – einig fürs Theater. Die Sanierung des Stadttheaters Bremerhaven 1997–2000. Städtische Grundstücksgesellschaft Bremerhaven, Wirtschaftsverlag NW, Bremerhaven 2000, ISBN 3-897-01599-4.
