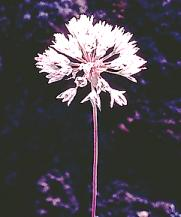

Conservation status
- Imperiled (NatureServe)

Scientific classification
- Kingdom: Plantae
- Clade: Tracheophytes
- Clade: Angiosperms
- Clade: Monocots
- Order: Asparagales
- Family: Amaryllidaceae
- Subfamily: Allioideae
- Genus: Allium
- Species: A. jepsonii

Binomial name
- Allium jepsonii (Ownbey & Aase) S. Denison & McNeal

Synonyms
- Allium sanbornii var. jepsonii Ownbey & Aase ex Traub

= Allium jepsonii =

Jepson's onion

Species of flowering plant

Allium jepsonii is a species of wild onion known by the common name Jepson's onion, honoring renowned California botanist Willis Linn Jepson.

== Distribution and habitat ==
Allium jepsonii is endemic to the foothills of the Sierra Nevada foothills of California, in Tuolumne, Placer, El Dorado, and Butte Counties. It is found at elevations of 300–600 metres (980–1,970 ft) and grows on clay soils.

== Description ==
Allium jepsonii, the Jepson's onion, grows to a height between about 20 and 40 centimeters from one or two oval-shaped bulbs. There is a single cylindrical leaf which is about the same length as the stem.

The inflorescence holds 20 to 60 small flowers, each under a centimeter long with pink-veined white tepals with curling tips.

== See also ==
- List of plants of the Sierra Nevada (U.S.)
- Endemic flora of California
