= Jaha's Promise =

2017 American-Gambian documentary film

- Directed by: Patrick Farrelly; Kate O'Callaghan
- Written by: Patrick Farrelly; Kate O'Callaghan
- Produced by: Patrick Farrelly; Kate O'Callaghan
- Starring: Jaha Dukureh
- Cinematography: Kate McCullough
- Music by: Michael Fleming
- Production companies: Accidental Pictures; Guardian News & Media
- Distributed by: First Hand Films
- Release date: 16 March 2017; (Denmark)
- Running time: 80 minutes
- Countries: United States; United Kingdom; Gambia
- Language: English

Jaha's Promise, is a 2017 American-Gambian documentary drama film co-directed and co-produced by Patrick Farrelly and Kate O'Callaghan. The film revolves around the life and activism of Jaha Dukureh, a Gambian anti-female genital mutilation campaigner against the most extreme form of Female Genital Mutilation (FGM), called infibulation or Type 3 FGM prevail in Gambian society.

The film made its premier on 16 March 2017 at the Copenhagen International Documentary Film Festival. The film received positive reviews from critics and screened at many film festivals. At the CPH:DOX 2017, the film was nominated for the F:ACT Award and then nominated for the Sheffield Youth Jury Award at the Sheffield International Documentary Festival. In 2018, the film was screened on the International Human Rights Defenders Day. The film also won the Audience Award at the Globe Docs Boston.
