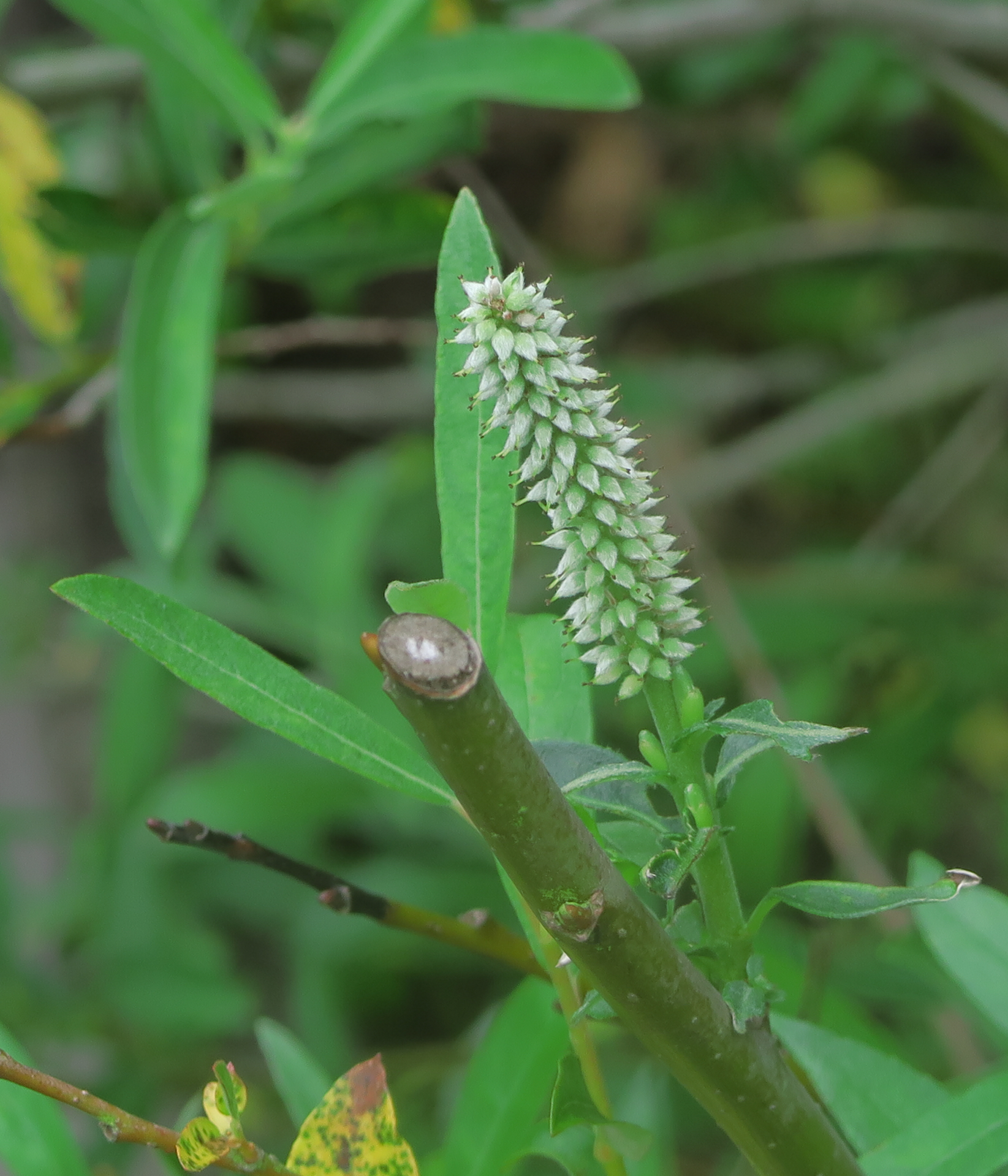

Scientific classification
- Kingdom: Plantae
- Clade: Tracheophytes
- Clade: Angiosperms
- Clade: Eudicots
- Clade: Rosids
- Order: Malpighiales
- Family: Salicaceae
- Genus: Salix
- Species: S. jepsonii

Binomial name
- Salix jepsonii C.K.Schneid.

= Salix jepsonii =

Species of willow

Salix jepsonii is a species of willow known by the common name Jepson's willow. it is named for renowned California botanist Willis Linn Jepson.

It is endemic to California, found in the Klamath Mountains and throughout the Sierra Nevada. It grows along rivers and streams in high mountain habitat, between 1,000–3,400 metres (3,300–11,200 ft) in elevation.

== Description ==
Salix jepsonii is a shrub growing 1–3 metres (3.3–9.8 ft) tall, sometimes forming colonial thickets. The lance-shaped leaves may grow over 10 centimeters long. They are hairy when new, and have silky hairs on the undersides when mature.

The inflorescence is a catkin of flowers, male catkins short and stout, measuring no more than 2 centimeters long, and female catkins reaching up to 6 centimeters in length. Its bloom period is June.
