= Viggo Jeppsson =

Swedish footballer (born 2006)

Personal information
- Date of birth: 24 March 2006 (age 20)
- Place of birth: Lomma, Sweden
- Height: 1.83 m (6 ft 0 in)
- Position: Midfielder

Team information
- Current team: Malmö FF
- Number: 42

Youth career
- –2013: GIF Nike
- 2014–2024: Malmö FF

Senior career*
Years	Team	Apps	(Gls)
2025–	Malmö FF	3	(0)
2025	→ BK Olympic (loan)	25	(1)

International career^{‡}
2022	Sweden U16	8	(1)
2022–2023	Sweden U17	11	(1)
2024	Sweden U18	9	(0)
2024	Sweden U19	3	(0)
- * Club domestic league appearances and goals as of 19 September 2026 ‡ National team caps and goals as of 16 September 2026

Viggo Jeppsson (born 24 March 2006) is a Swedish professional footballer who plays as a central midfielder for Allsvenskan club Malmö FF.

== Club career ==
Jeppsson began his career at GIF Nike from Lomma, but already at the age of seven he switched to the academy of Malmö FF. In 2022, he was part of the under-17 team that won P17 Allsvenskan. Ahead of the 2025 season Jeppsson was promoted to the first team on a three-year-contract, after a successful period with the under-19s. Following his promotion he was subsequently sent on loan to Ettan Södra club BK Olympic.

In 2026, Jeppsson decided to stay at Malmö FF to fight for a first team-spot, instead of once again going out on loan. He made his competitive debut for the club on 1 March 2026 in a 3–1 Svenska Cupen win against IF Karlstad. After a long bout of zero appearances, he ultimately made his Allsvenskan debut on 7 September 2026 as a substitute for Otto Rosengren in a 0–0 draw against AIK at Eleda Stadion. In the following game, on 13 September, he registered his first assist for the club with a "no-look" assist to Jovan Milosavljević's 4–1 goal, as Malmö FF closed out the win versus Örgryte IS.

== International career ==
Jeppsson is a Swedish youth international, having represented Sweden's under-16s, under-17s, under-18s, and under-19s – frequently doing so as captain. He made his youth international debut on 26 April 2022 in a 1–3 friendly loss against the Netherlands U16.

== Style of play ==
When Jeppsson was promoted to Malmö FF's first team, sporting director Daniel Andersson described him as a hard-working box-to-box midfielder.

== Career statistics ==
As of match played 19 September 2026

Appearances and goals by club, season and competition
Club	Season	League			Cup		Europe		Other		Total	
Club	Season	Division	Apps	Goals	Apps	Goals	Apps	Goals	Apps	Goals	Apps	Goals
Malmö FF	2025	Allsvenskan	0	0	—		—		—		0	0
Malmö FF	2026	Allsvenskan	3	0	2	0	0	0	—		5	0
Malmö FF	Total		3	0	2	0	0	0	0	0	5	0
BK Olympic (loan)	2025	Ettan Södra	25	1	1	0	—		—		26	1
Career total			28	1	3	0	0	0	0	0	31	1
