= Steen Ipsen =

Danish artist

- Born: Steen Ipsen; 1966 (age 59–60); Naestved, Denmark
- Education: Danish School of Design, Copenhagen, Kolding School of Design
- Known for: Ceramic art, Sculpture
- Movement: Contemporary ceramics

Steen Ipsen (born 1966) is a Danish artist and teacher who works with ceramics. He generally creates his art in series, often based on natural occurrences such as crystallisation, cell division and cell fission.

== Education and employment ==
Steen was first admitted to the Danish School of design in Copenhagen in 1984 but changed to the Design School Kolding in 1987. He then graduated in 1990 with a degree majoring in Ceramics.

In 2014 he had a solo exhibition at Copenhagen Ceramics, showing a series called Organic. In 2016 he exhibited his work in Paris.

== Collaborative work ==
In 2011, Steen made a series of works titled “Extrudox A/S” in collaboration with fellow Danish ceramicist Anne Tophøj. This work focused on new techniques of shaping clay with the example of the extruder. Using this machine meant that the clay was heated and could be pulled in one continuous profile (in forms such as piping or tubing). Together they experimented with this new way of creating, which resulted in a variety of differently shaped and coloured forms. In their statement for their exhibition at the Ann Linnemann Gallery in Copenhagen, they said “Extruding… is a here-and-now technique, where objects are finished in taste tempo as they come out of the extruder”.

== Prizes ==
- 1991: Applied Art Prize of 1879, Bronze Medal
- 1995: Pre-Qualified for the competition: “Ceramics for Everyday Use: Danish Arts Foundation
- 2007: Won Honourable Mention in the 4th World Ceramic Biennale, South Korea
- 2011: Annie and Otto Detlefs Foundation, The Big Ceramic Prize, Copenhagen
- 2013-2015 (active): Danish Arts Foundation, 3 years Working Grant
