= Ibsen Studies =

- Discipline: Arts
- Language: English

Publication details
- Former names: Ibsenårbok; Contemporary Approaches to Ibsen
- History: Since 1952
- Publisher: Routledge on behalf of the Centre for Ibsen Studies (Norway)
- Frequency: Biannually

Standard abbreviations
- ISO 4: Ibsen Stud.

Indexing
- ISSN: 1502-1866 (print); 1741-8720 (web)
- LCCN: 2001207210
- OCLC no.: 46241010

Links
- Journal homepage

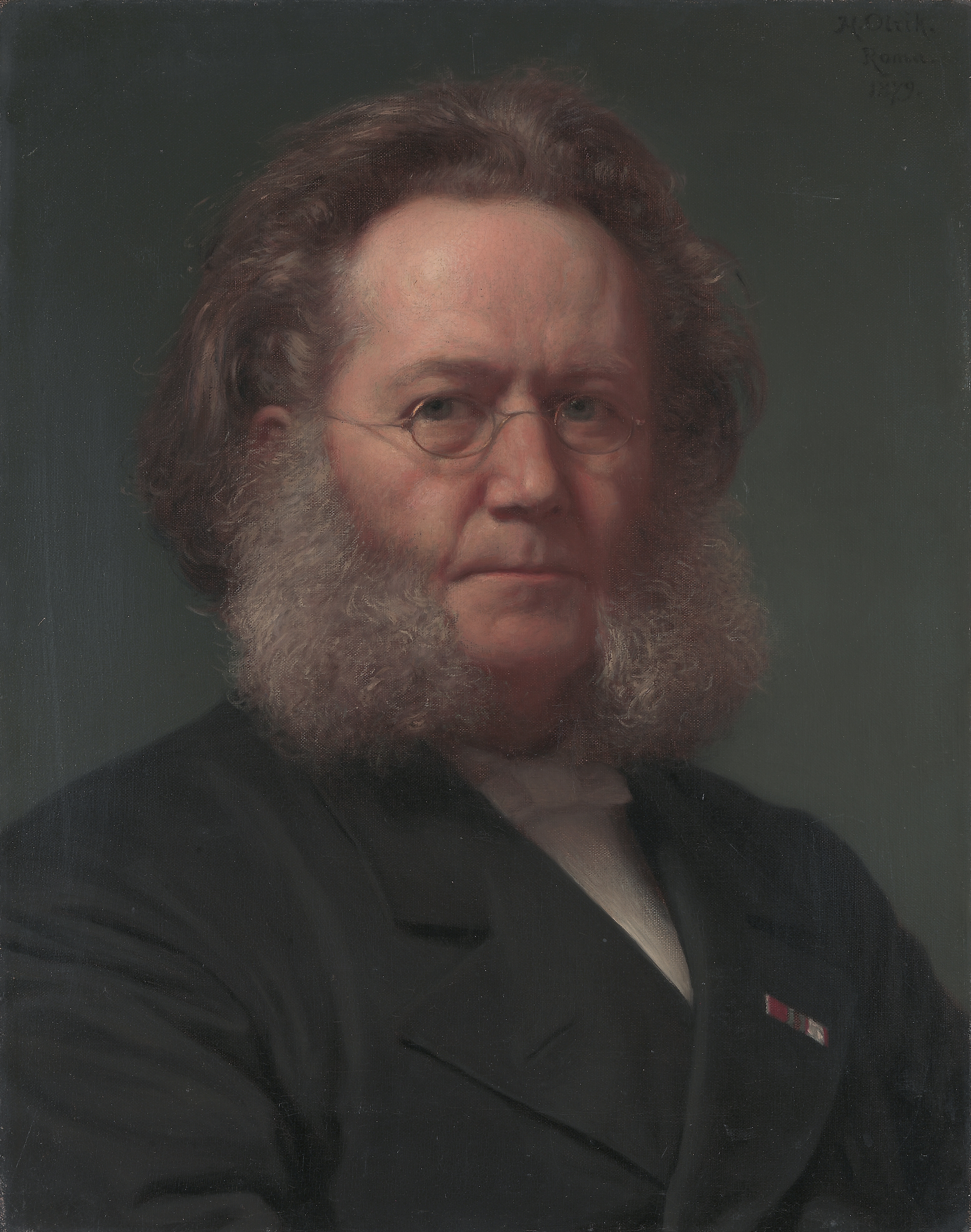
Henrik Ibsen by Henrik Olrik (1879)

Ibsen Studies is a peer-reviewed academic journal covering research on the playwright Henrik Ibsen. It is published biannually by the Centre for Ibsen Studies at the University of Oslo. It was originally published annually under the title Ibsenårbok by Universitetsforlaget from 1952 to 1988. From 1988 to 2000, it was published by Universitetsforlaget as Contemporary approaches to Ibsen. Since 2000, it has been published under the title Ibsen Studies by Routledge on behalf of the Centre for Ibsen Studies.

The journal includes reviews of current Ibsen-related literature and a section on Ibsen-related events. It includes contributions from historians as well as literary and theatre scholars. The journal is classified as a level 2 journal, meaning the journal is considered leading in the field of literature studies, in the Norwegian Scientific Index, published by the Ministry of Education and Research.
