= Conny and Johanna Strandberg =

Swedish sidecarcross team

Conny and Johanna Strandberg is a Swedish sidecarcross team, and one of very few male-female teams in this sport. They started racing in 1998 for the fun of it, only doing one race. They continued until 2005 after they missed the Swedish Championship's third place in 2004 by two points (ending up in fourth place), yet making their best result ever. They became the first mixed team to take World Championships points, in 2002 and then again in 2003. Throughout their career, they changed appearance many times, with new colour schemes on bike and clothes every year. Only in 2004 did they keep the same colours.

In 2009, they made a brief comeback for one season.

Conny Strandberg (born 1960), Swedish sidecarcross driver. Started driving in 1984, best results in 199x, Swedish Championships second. Had several passengers, most famous of them Henrik Söderkvist in 1991-93 (who went on to become Swedish Champion in 1999-2004 as a driver with Tobias Sylwan as passenger) and Johanna Jeppsson, 1998-2004 (J Strandberg from 2002). Finished his career in 2004 with an overall fourth place in the Swedish Championships.

Johanna Strandberg (born Jeppsson, 1979), Swedish sidecarcross passenger. She is the most successful of very few female sidecar passengers (no drivers are known). Followed in her fathers (Gösta Jeppsson) footsteps with then boyfriend Conny Strandberg as they raced in the final Swedish Championship of 1997 just for the fun of it. They did well and decided to continue. She raced in the Swedish and Danish Championships as well as the World GPs throughout Europe and became the first woman to take GP points, at the Estonian GP in 2002. In 2010, Johanna continued as a sidecarcross passenger and teamed up with Magnus Birgersson from Varberg, after Conny felt unable to continue after the 2009 season.

== Results ==
=== Swedish Championships ===
- 1998 – 26
- 1999 – 17
- 2000 – 7
- 2001 – 8
- 2002 – 8
- 2003 – 10
- 2004 – 4

=== World Championships ===
- 2002 – 56
- 2003 - 55

== Frame/engine ==
- 98-99: EML-Zabel
- 99-02: BSU-MTH
- 03-04: BSU-KTM
