= Atle Jebsen =

Norwegian businessman (1935–2009)

Atle Jebsen (10 November 1935 – 13 October 2009) was a Norwegian businessperson and ship-owner.

Jebsen was born in Bergen in 1935 and was a great-grandson of Peter Jebsen. He was one of the most important persons in the Norwegian shipping during the turbulent 1960s and created the Jebsen Group during the 1970s.

Atle Jebsen died in a car crash on 13 October 2009.
