= Peter Jebsen =

Norwegian politician (1824–1892)

Peter Jebsen ( 6 May 1824 – 30 October 1892) was a Norwegian businessperson and politician. He was the founder of Dale of Norway.

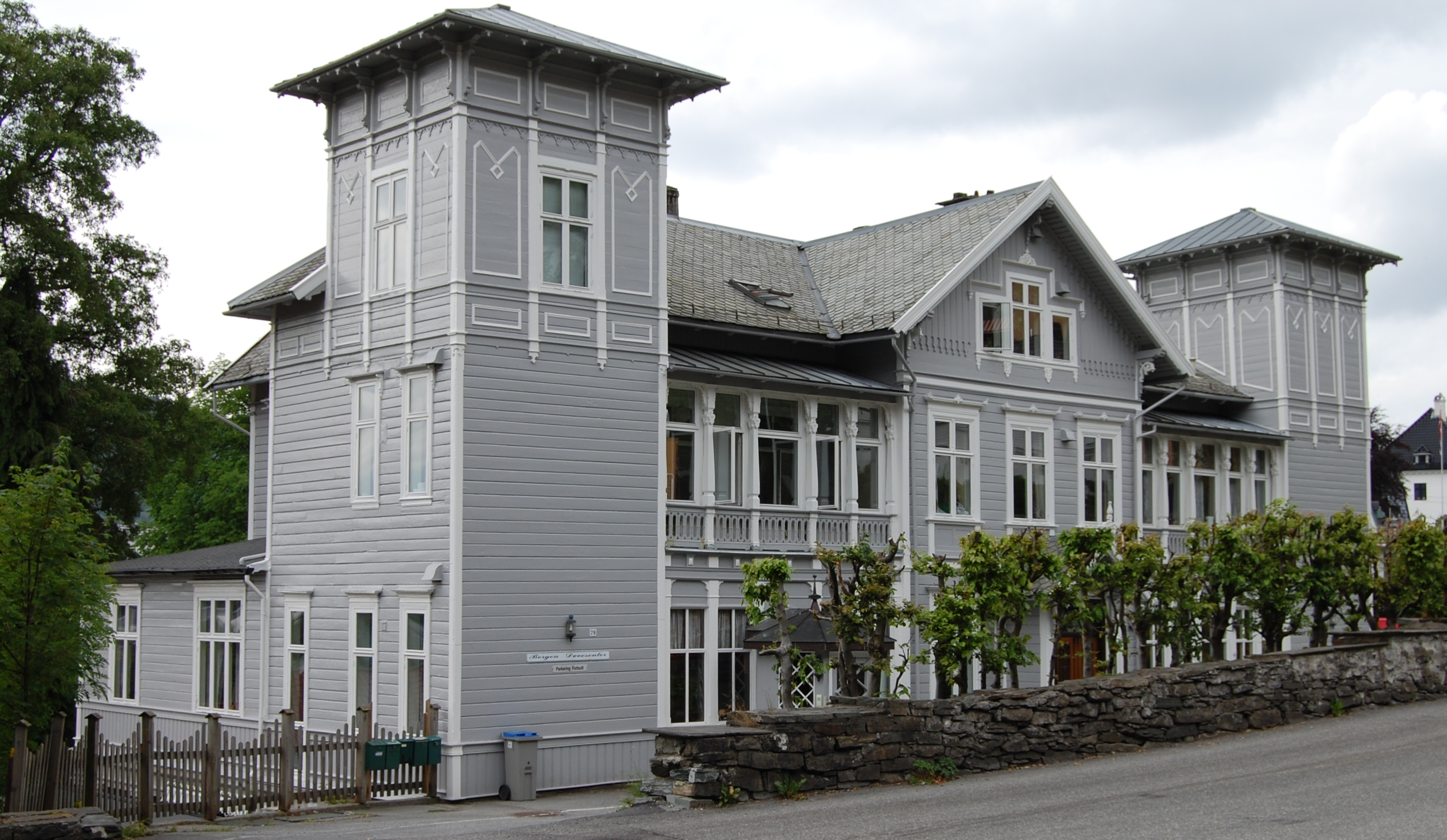
Peter Jebsen residence at Kalfarveien in Bergen Architect: Franz Wilhelm Schiertz

== Background ==
Jebsen was born at Broager in the Duchy of Schleswig. He was the son of Jens Jebsen (1778–1850) and Maren Hansen (1790–1835). Jebsen grew up in the village of Skelde on the Broager Peninsula in Sønderjylland, Denmark.

== Career ==
In 1839, he began his career working at his brother's manufacturing and trade firm in Sønderborg and subsequently for a brother-in-law in the cloth industry at Hamburg. He moved to Bergen in 1843, bought a river in Ytre Arna for 200 specidaler borrowed money and started manufacturing cloth. As one of the first manufactures in the country, profits gained were high due to protectionism against import of wool. He left in 1844 to study modern textile production in the Netherlands, Germany, Belgium, Switzerland, France and the UK. He returned in 1848 with sufficient knowledge to start a mechanical weaving firm. His brother Jürg Jebsen opened a wool mill in 1852. The two companies were assembled in 1863 as P. Jebsen & Co. and from 1878 as Arne Fabriker A / S.

In 1878, he started a factory at the village of Dale in Hordaland. The site offered an ideal place to establish a premium textile production facility utilizing the valley’s natural hydro power. The textile facility, Dale Fabrikker (now known as Dale of Norway) was completed in 1879 and has remained active ever since.

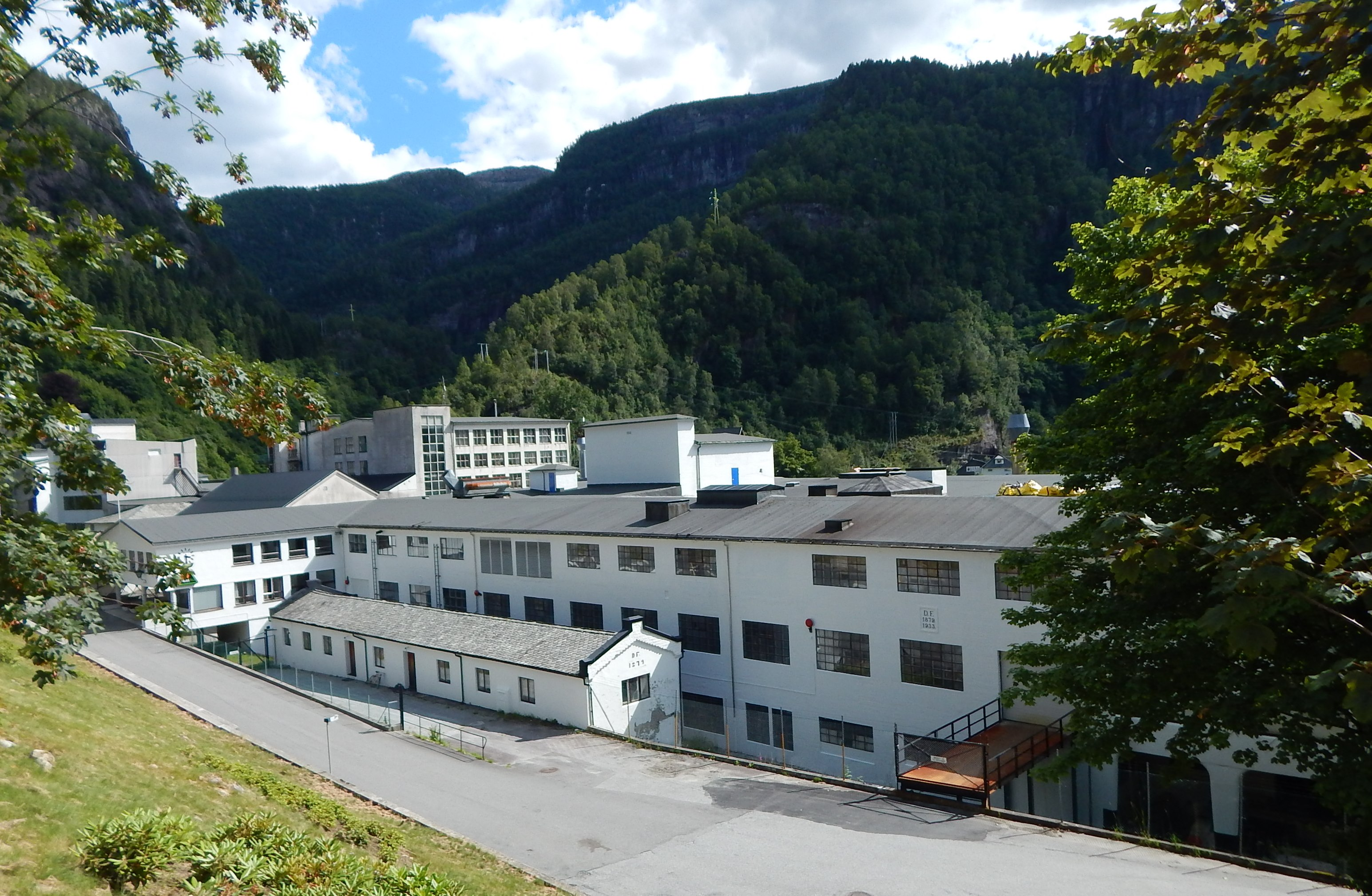
Dale of Norway facilities (2017)

His other ventures included shipping, mining in Sunnhordland with Nils Henrik Bruun, a glass mill in Bergen and initiating the water and power utilities in Bergen.

Jebsen was mayor in the borough of Arna and later city councilor in Bergen. He was elected to the Norwegian Parliament in 1874-76 and in 1880-82. He was one of the prime promoters of the construction of Vossebanen railway; personally guaranteeing part of the construction costs. Later he was consulate in Bergen for Saxony, later for the North German Federation and 1871-76 for the German Empire. He remained a member of the Bergen city council until his death in 1892.

== Personal life ==
He married twice; 1) in 1853 with Anna Uthuus (1829-1870) 2) in 1871 with Sophia Catharina Sundt (1849-1912). He was the father of twenty-three children. His youngest son was industrialist Gustav Adolf Jebsen (1884-1951) His descendants included ship-owner, Kristian Gerhard Jebsen (1927–2004) and Atle Jebsen (1935–2009).

== Other sources ==
- Kaare R. Jebsen and Peter M. Jebsen (2004) Slekten Jebsen fra Broagerland, Danmark (Bergen: John Grieg Forlag A/S) ISBN 82-303-0345-2
