= Jepsen =

- Pronunciation: /ˈdʒɛpsən/ German: [ˈjɛpsn̩]

Origin
- Languages: Danish, Norwegian
- Meaning: 'Jacob's son'

Other names
- Related names: Jepson, Jephson, Ibsen

Jepsen is a Danish–Norwegian and Low German patronymic surname meaning "son of Jep" (equivalent of Jacob). A homonymous form is Jebsen. The surname Jepsen has alternate spellings, including the English language Jepson. It may refer to the following notable people:

== Surname ==
- Aage Jepsen Sparre (1462–1540), Danish priest, Archbishop of Lund
- Allan K. Jepsen (born 1977), Danish football player
- Carly Rae Jepsen (born 1985), Canadian singer/songwriter
- George Jepsen (born 1954), Attorney General of Connecticut
- Glenn Lowell Jepsen (1903–1974), American paleontologist
- Les Jepsen (born 1967), American basketball player
- Kevin Jepsen (born 1984), American baseball player
- Maria Jepsen (born 1945), German, first woman to become a Lutheran bishop in the Evangelical Church in Germany and worldwide
- Marie Jepsen (1940–2018), Danish politician
- Mary Lou Jepsen (born 1965), American, founding chief technology officer of One Laptop Per Child
- Roger Jepsen (1928–2020), U.S. Senator from Iowa
- Thomas Jepsen (born 1973), German politician

== Jebsen ==
- Jørg Tofte Jebsen (1888–1922), Norwegian physicist
- Peter Jebsen (1824–1892), Norwegian businessperson and politician

== See also ==
- Jepson
- Ibsen
