= Jephson family =

Jephson (also spelt Gestson) may refer to various members of, or estates belonging to, a landed family chiefly seated in the English county of Hampshire and the Irish county Cork.

The Gestson surname suggests this family were of Scandinavian descent.

== Family tree of notable members ==
Family tree

William Jephson granted manor of Froyle 1534
William Jephson; High Sheriff of Hampshire 1551
Sir William Jephson (died 1615); MP for Hampshire | Maj-Gen Sir John Jephson (died 1638); MP for Hampshire and Petersfield | Elizabeth heiress of Sir Thomas Norreys of Mallow Castle
Maj-Gen William Jephson (1609–1658); MP for Stockbridge and Envoy to Sweden; sold Froyle estate in 1653 | Colonel Norreys Jephson | Maj-Gen John Jephson
Colonel John Jephson (died 1693); MP for Mallow | William Jephson (died 1691); MP for East Grinstead and Chipping Wycombe | Anthony Jephson (died 1721) | William Jephson (died 1720); Dean of Kilmore
William Jephson (died 1698); MP for Mallow | William Jephson (died 1716); MP for Mallow | Anthony Jephson (died 1755); MP for Mallow | John Jephson (died 1742); Archdeacon of Cloyne
Denham Jephson (died 1781); MP for Mallow | William Jephson (died 1779); MP for Mallow | William Norreys Jephson (1734–1791); Archdeacon of Cork | Robert Jephson (1736–1803); MP for St Johnstown, Old Leighlin and Granard
Denham Jephson (died 1813); MP for Mallow | Anthony Jephson (died 1794); MP for Mallow | Lt-Col William Jephson (died 1816) | John Jephson (1764–1826); Rector of Mullaghbrack | Sir Richard Mounteney Jephson, 1st Bt (1765–1824); Judge of the Admiralty
Sir Charles Denham Orlando Jephson-Norreys, 1st Bt (1799–1888); MP for Mallow | John Mounteney Jephson (1819–1865); Vicar of Childerditch | Sir Richard Mounteney Jephson, 2nd Bt (died 1870) | Sir James Saumarez Jephson, 3rd Bt (1802–1884) | Maj-Gen Sir Stanhope William Jephson, 4th Bt (1810–1900)
Catherine Louisa Jephson (died 1911) heiress of Mallow Castle; married James MacEwan, Dean of Ardfert | Jermy Frederick Jephson (1850–1903) | John Pascoe Jermy Jephson (1855–1923) | Arthur Jermy Mounteney Jephson (1858–1908)
Brigadier Maurice Denham Jephson (1890–1968) inherited Mallow Castle 1938 | John Mounteney Norreys (1888–1971) | Arthur Desmond Mounteney Jephson-Norreys (1905–1938) inherited Mallow Castle 1911
Lt-Cdr Maurice Christian Mounteney Jephson (1919–1989) inherited Mallow Castle 1968; sold it in 1984
