= Jephson =

Jephson, a surname, may refer to:

- Anthony Jephson (disambiguation), name of multiple people
- Arthur Jephson (1859–1908), English merchant seaman and army officer
- Denham Jephson (disambiguation), name of multiple people
- Digby Jephson (1871–1926), English cricketer
- John Jephson (disambiguation), name of multiple people
- Paul Jephson, who disappeared from the Bennington Triangle in 1950
- Robert Jephson (1736–1803), Irish dramatist and politician
- Selwyn Jephson (1900–1978), English cricketer
- William Jephson (disambiguation), name of multiple people

== Middle name ==
- Peter Jephson Cameron (born 1947), Australian mathematician
- Robert Jephson Jones (1905–1985), British Army officer

== Others ==
- Jephson baronets
- Jephson family
- Jephson Gardens
