= William Jephson =

William Jephson may refer to:

- Sir William Jephson (died 1615), MP for Hampshire
- William Jephson (died 1658), MP for Stockbridge and Cork
- William Jephson (died 1691), MP for East Grinstead and Wycombe
- William Jephson (died 1698), MP for Mallow
- William Jephson (died 1716), MP for Mallow
- William Jephson (died 1779), MP for Mallow
- William Jephson (priest) (died 1720), dean of Lismore
- William Jephson (cricketer) (1873–1956), English cricketer
