= St Brendan's Church, Bantry =

Anglican Church in County Cork, Ireland

Coordinates: 51.68092°N 9.45307°W

The Church of Saint Brendan the Navigator
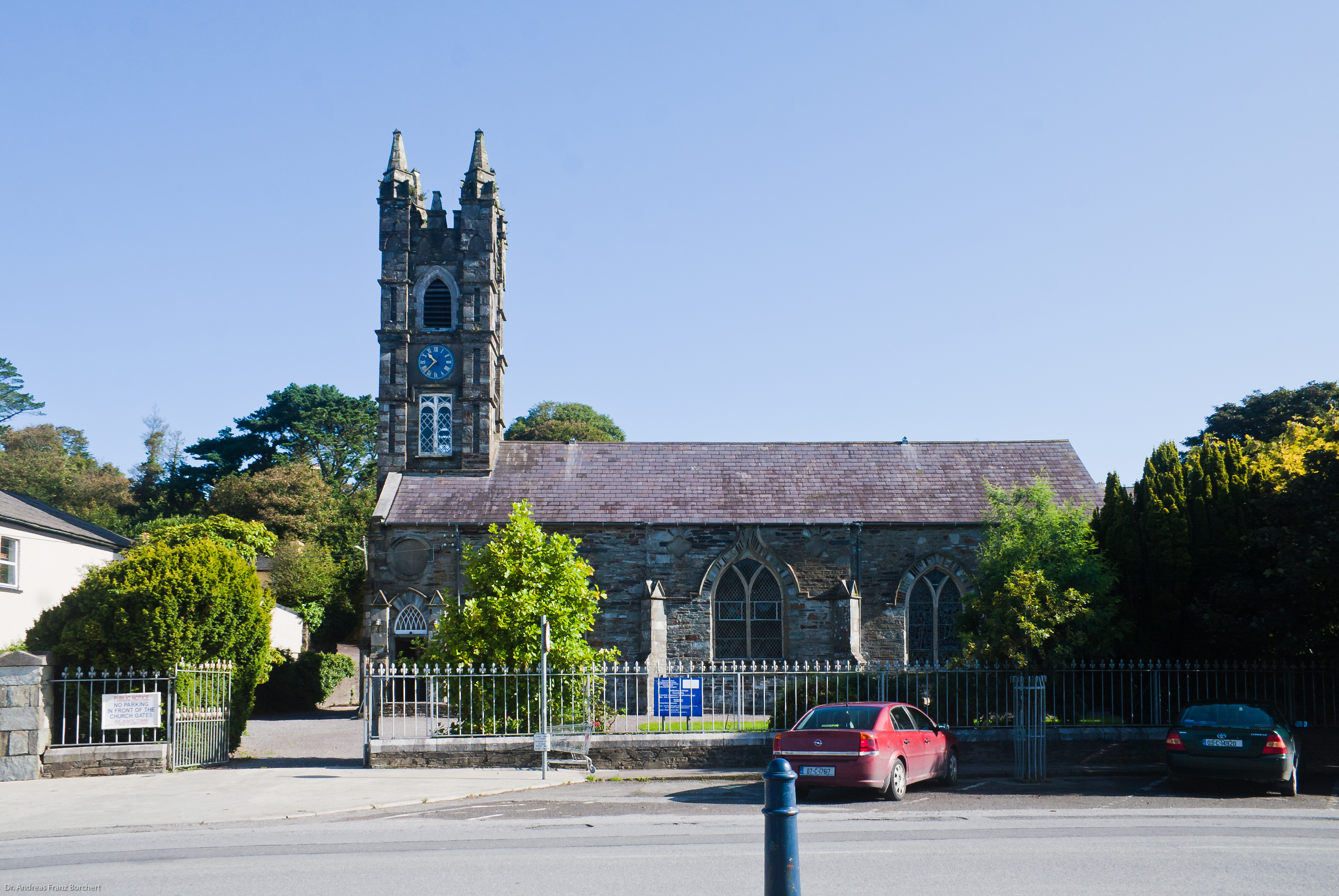
- The church in September 2009
- The Church of Saint Brendan the Navigator
- Country: Ireland
- Denomination: Church of Ireland

Architecture
- Architect: Henry Edward Kendall

St Brendan's Church is a small Gothic Revival Anglican church located in Kilmocomogue, Bantry, County Cork, Ireland. It was completed in 1828. It is dedicated to Brendan the Navigator. It is part of the Kilmocomogue Union of Parishes in the Diocese of Cork, Cloyne, and Ross.

== History ==
The Church of Saint Brendan the Navigator was built between 1815 and 1828. A new chancel and a chancel arch were added in 1868. A church bell was added in the 1880s. In 2000, the church was rededicated to Brendan the Navigator.

== Architecture ==
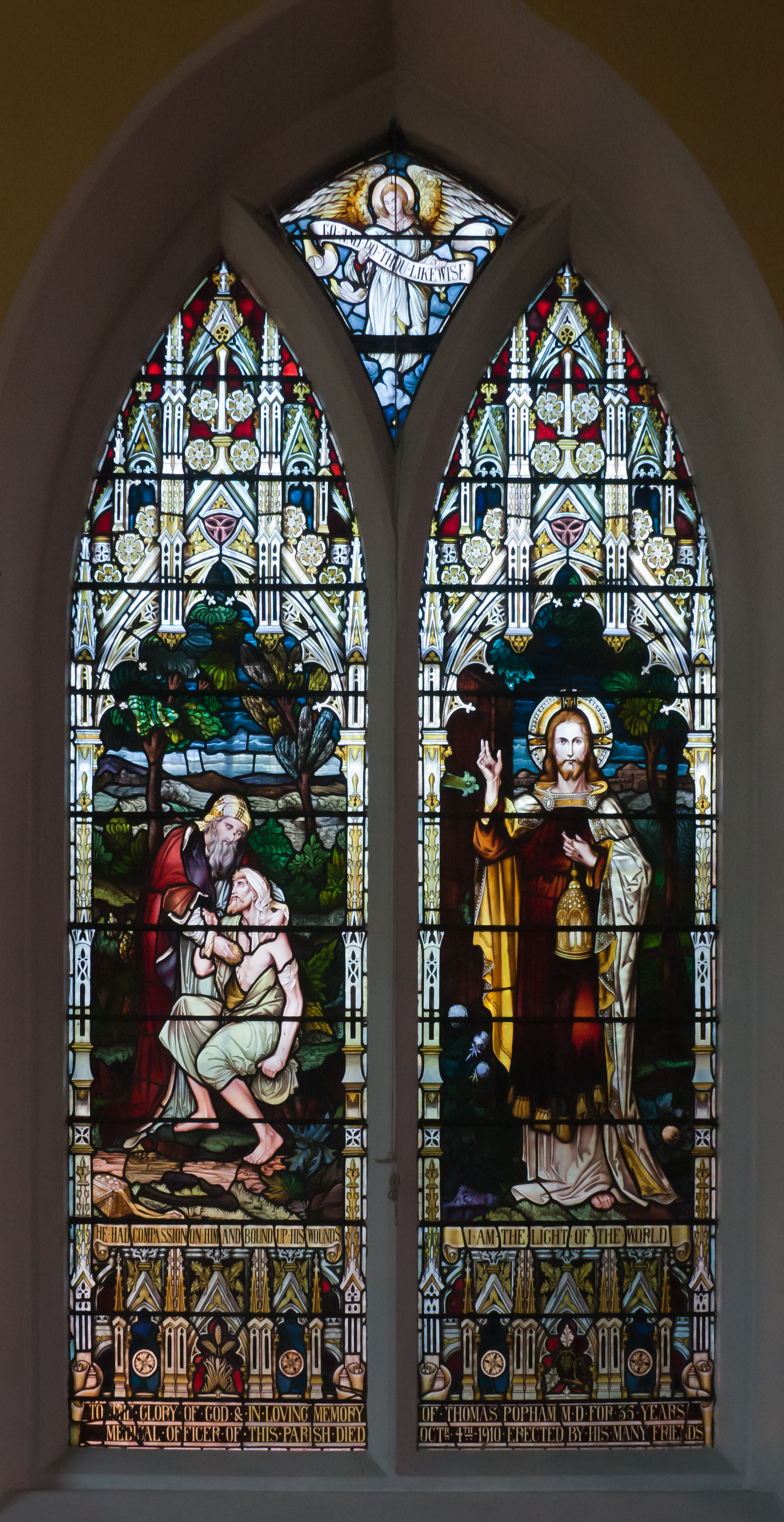
A stained glass window dating from 1910 seen from inside the church, depicting the parable of the Good Samartian (left) and Christ as Light of the World (right).

The church was designed by English architect Henry Edward Kendall. It is built in the Gothic Revival architectural style. A statue of Saint Brendan is erected in the square outside the church. It is built of green slate rubble stone, and features a font gifted by William Hedges-White, the 3rd Earl of Bantry.
