= Bulstrode Whitelocke =

English politician (1605–1675)

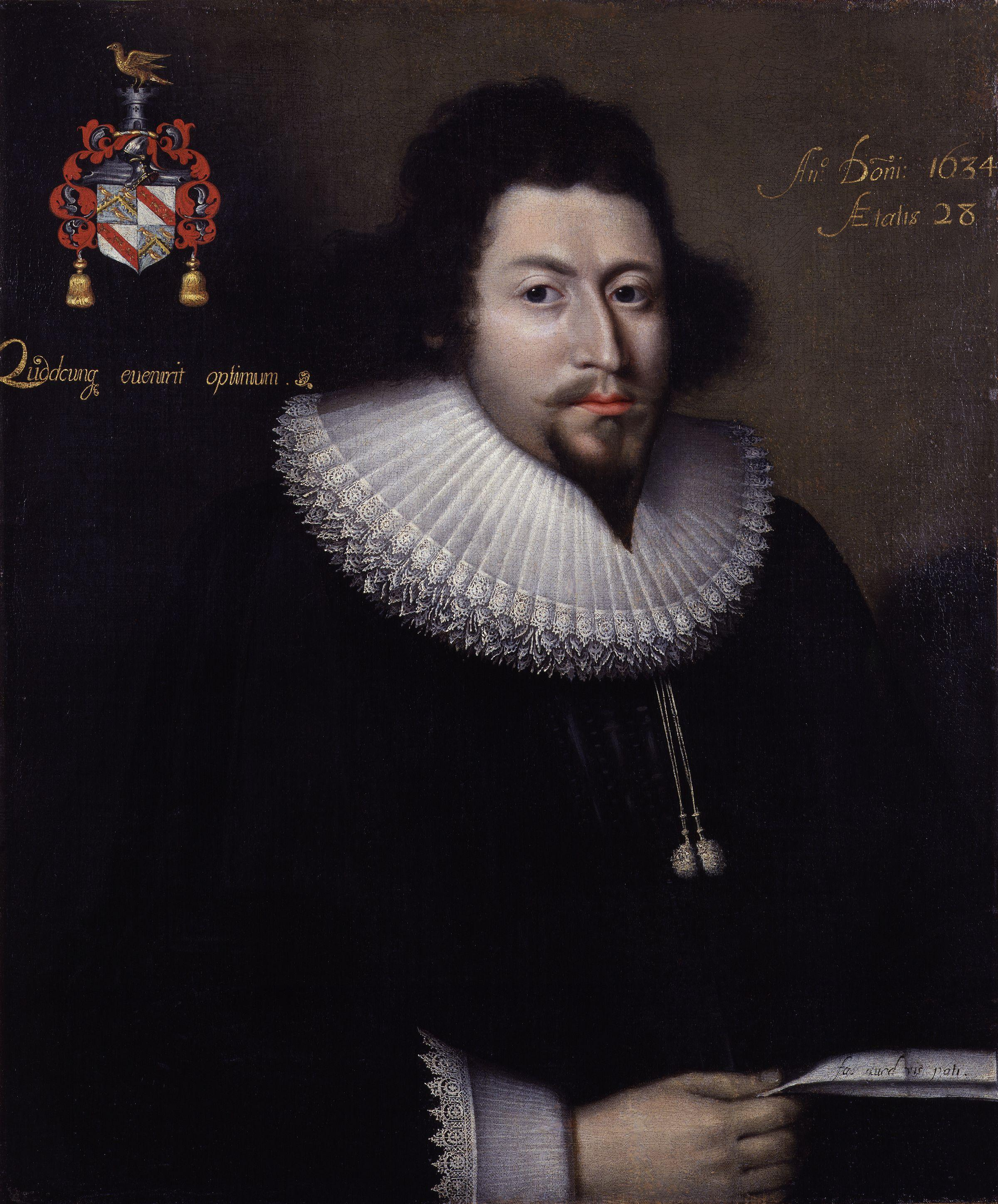
- Bulstrode Whitelocke, 1634

Ambassador to Sweden
- In office 1653–1654
- Succeeded by: William Jephson

Member of Parliament for Stafford
- In office 1626–1626 Serving with Sir John Offley
- Preceded by: Matthew Craddock; Robert Hatton
- Succeeded by: Matthew Craddock; William Wingfield

Personal details
- Born: 6 August 1605 London, England
- Died: 28 July 1675 (aged 69)
- Spouse(s): Rebecca Bennet (m. 1630; died 1634) Frances Willoughby (m. 1635; died 1649) Mary Wilson (m. 1651)
- Parents: Sir James Whitelocke (father); Elizabeth Bulstrode (mother)
- Relatives: Edmund Whitelocke (uncle); James Whitelocke (son); William Whitelock (son); Lord Willoughby of Parham (father-in-law)
- Education: Eton College; Merchant Taylors' School
- Alma mater: St John's College, Oxford

Sir Bulstrode Whitelocke (6 August 1605 – 28 July 1675) was an English lawyer, writer, parliamentarian, and one of the commissioners of the Great Seal during the Interregnum.

== Early life ==
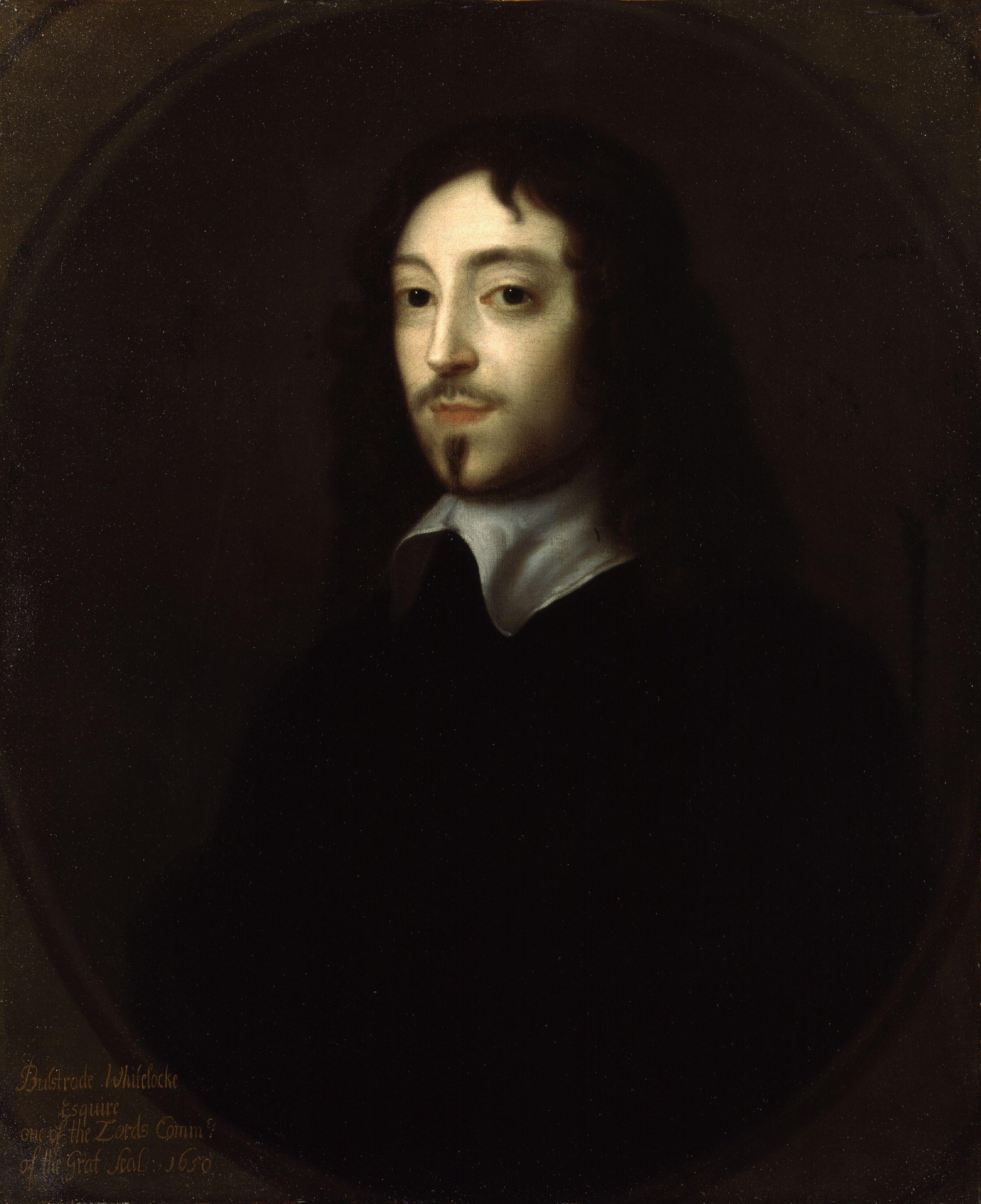
Bulstrode Whitelocke, 1650

He was the eldest son of Sir James Whitelocke and Elizabeth Bulstrode, and was born on 6 August 1605 at George Croke's house in Fleet Street, London. He was baptized on 19 August 1605 at the nearby church of St Dunstan-in-the-West, where his mother's parents were married in 1571; his notorious uncle Edmund Whitelocke, being one of the godfathers, announced that the child was to be called Bulstrode. The vicar demurred, but Edmund insisted that he bear his mother's name, "Bulstrode or Elizabeth, let them choose which they please". Bulstrode was educated briefly at Eton College, then at Merchant Taylors' School and at St John's College, Oxford, where he matriculated on 8 December 1620.

== Early career ==
He left Oxford, without a degree, for the Middle Temple, and was called to the bar in 1626; in 1628 he became treasurer of his Temple. He was fond of field sports and of music, and in 1633/34 he had charge of the music in the great masque "The Triumph of Peace" performed by the Inns of Court before Charles I of England and Henrietta Maria of France.

== As lawyer ==
He was appointed Recorder of Abingdon (1632–49), of Oxford (1647–49), of Bristol (1651–55), and Counsel for Henley (1632).

== Enters politics ==
He was elected for Stafford in the parliament of 1626. In 1640, he was chosen Member for Great Marlow in the Long Parliament.

He took a prominent part in the proceedings against Strafford, was Chairman of the Committee of Management, and had charge of articles XIX–XXIV of the impeachment. He drew up the Bill for making Parliaments indissoluble except by their own consent, and supported the Grand Remonstrance and the action taken in the House of Commons against the illegal canons; on the militia question, however, he advocated a joint control by King and Parliament.

== His part in the Civil War ==
On the outbreak of the English Civil War he took the side of the Parliament, using his influence in the country as Deputy-Lieutenant to prevent the King from raising troops in Buckinghamshire and Oxfordshire.

He was sent to the King at Oxford in 1643 and again in 1644 to negotiate terms, and the secret communications with King Charles on the latter occasion were the foundation of a charge of treason brought later against Whitelocke and Denzil Holles. He was one of the Commissioners at the Treaty of Uxbridge in 1645.

Nevertheless, he opposed the policy of Holles and the Peace Party and the proposed disbanding of the army in 1647, and, although he was one of the lay members of the Assembly of Divines, he repudiated the claims of divine authority put forward by the Presbyterians for their Church, and approved of religious tolerance. He thus gravitated more towards Oliver Cromwell and the Army Party, but he took no part in either the disputes between the Army and Parliament or in the trial of the King. On the establishment of the Commonwealth, though out of sympathy with the government, he was nominated to the Council of State and as a Commissioner of the Parliament's new Great Seal (1659–60).

He purportedly urged Cromwell after the Battle of Worcester and again in 1652 to recall the Royal Family. In 1653 he disapproved of the expulsion of the Long Parliament and he was especially marked out for attack by Cromwell in his speech on that occasion.

== Ambassador to Sweden ==
Later in the autumn of 1653 Whitelocke was despatched on a mission to Christina, Queen of Sweden, to conclude a treaty of alliance and assure the freedom of the Sound.

His journey to Sweden was reportedly difficult. He left England on November 6, arrived at Gothenburg on November 15 where he rested for a fortnight, and arrived at Uppsala on December 20.

Christina and her government, and Whitelocke argued over the articles of the treaty. Despite this disagreement, records indicate that Christina and Whitelocke shared an amicable relationship. They exchanged gifts and he was invited and took part in masques and May Day celebrations despite England's strict Puritan faith.

Whitelocke was present for Christina's abdication ceremony on May 11 1654.

Retroactively, the diplomatic mission caused him to be considered as the first of the country's Ambassadors to Sweden, though at the time this was not a regular or fixed position. He was knighted in 1654.

== His return to Britain ==
On his return he resumed his office as Commissioner of the Great Seal, was appointed a Commissioner of the Treasury with a salary of £1000, and was returned to Parliament in 1654 for each of the four constituencies of Bedford, Exeter, Oxford and Buckinghamshire, electing to sit for the latter constituency.

Whitelocke was a learned and sound lawyer. He had hitherto shown himself not unsympathetic to reform, having supported the Bill introducing the use of English into legal proceedings, having drafted a new treason law, and having set on foot some alterations in Chancery procedure. A tract advocating the registering of title deeds is attributed to him. He defeated a bill which sought to exclude lawyers from parliament; and to the sweeping and ill-considered changes in the Court of Chancery proposed by Cromwell and the Council he offered an unbending and honourable resistance, being dismissed in consequence, together with his colleague Sir Thomas Widdrington, on 6 June 1654 from his Commissionership of the Great Seal (see William Lenthall).

However, he still remained on good terms with Cromwell, by whom he was respected; he took part in public business, acted as Cromwell's adviser on foreign affairs, negotiated the treaty with Sweden of 1656, and, was elected again to the Parliament of the same year, as Member for Buckinghamshire, he was chairman of the committee which conferred with Cromwell on the subject of the Petition and Advice and urged the protector to assume the title of King. In December 1657 he became a member of Cromwell's Other House.

== Under Richard Cromwell ==
On Richard Cromwell's assumption of the Protectorship, Whitelocke was reappointed a Commissioner of the Great Seal, and had considerable influence during the former's short tenure of power. He returned to his place in the Long Parliament on its recall, was appointed a member of the Council of State on 14 May 1659, and became president in August. Subsequently, on the fresh expulsion of the Long Parliament, he was included in the Committee of Safety which superseded the council. He again received the Great Seal into his keeping on 1 November. During the period which immediately preceded the Restoration he endeavoured to oppose George Monck's schemes, and desired Charles Fleetwood to forestall him and make terms with King Charles, but in vain.

== End of his career ==
On the failure of his plans, he retired to the country and awaited events. Whitelocke's career, however, had been marked by moderation and good sense throughout. The necessity of carrying on the government of the country somehow or other had been the chief motive of his adherence to Cromwell rather than any sympathy for a republic or a military dictatorship, and his advice to Cromwell to accept the title of King was doubtless tendered with the object of giving the administration greater stability and of protecting its adherents under the Statute of Henry VII. Nor had he shown himself unduly ambitious or self-seeking in the pursuit of office, and he had proved himself ready to sacrifice high place to the claims of professional honour and duty. These considerations were not without weight with his contemporaries at the Restoration. Accordingly, Whitelocke was not excepted from the Act of Indemnity, and after the payment of various sums to the King and others he was allowed to retain the bulk of his property.

In retirement, he dedicated part of his home Chilton Lodge at Chilton Foliat as a Congregational meeting house, with up to 300 people in attendance. He is commemorated in the placename, Whitelocks Piece, in the village.

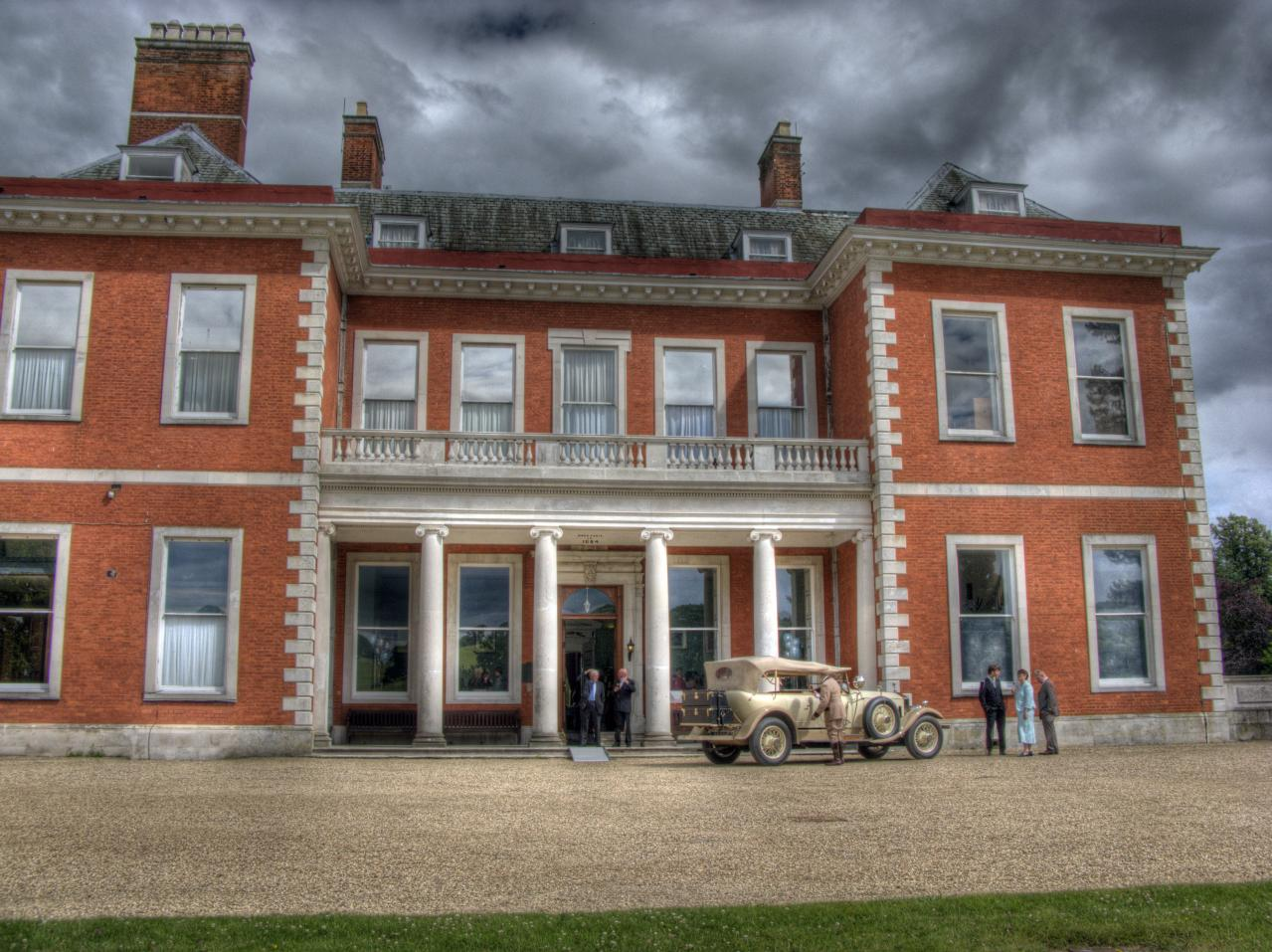
Fawley Court

== Family ==
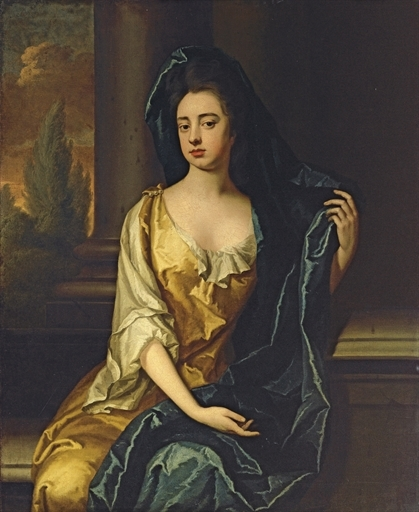
Frances Willoughby Whitelock, portrait by Michael Dahl

Whitelocke purchased Greenlands House, Berkshire in 1651. The purchase of this land resulted in Whitelocke owning 3 miles of Thames waterfront below Henley-on-Thames. The site is now the home of Henley Business School, part of the University of Reading. Whitelocke lived at Fawley Court in Buckinghamshire which he had inherited from his father in 1632. After the house was damaged during the Civil War he gave it to his son James and lived henceforth in seclusion at Chilton Lodge near Chilton Foliat in Wiltshire, dying on 28 July 1675, aged 69.

Whitelocke married three times:

1. in June 1630, Rebecca, daughter of Thomas Bennet, alderman of London. She was adjudged insane, and died on 9 May 1634.
  - Their eldest son, James (13 July 1631 – 1701), served in Cromwell's guard in Ireland, was chosen colonel of an Oxfordshire militia regiment in 1651, was knighted by the Protector on 6 January 1657, represented Aylesbury in the parliament of 1659.
2. on 9 November 1635, Frances (died 1649), daughter of Lord Willoughby of Parham, with whom he had nine children.
  - His eldest son by his second marriage, William Whitelocke, entertained William III on his journey to London, and was knighted by him on 10 April 1689.
3. about 1651, Mary, daughter of one Carleton, and widow of Rowland Wilson, with whom he had four sons and several daughters.

An account of the distribution of his property among these different sons is given in R. H. Whitelocke's Life of Whitelocke.

== Bibliography ==
Whitelocke was the author of:

- Memorials of the English Affairs from the Beginning of the Reign of Charles I, published 1682 and reprinted. According to the author of Whitelocke's biography in the Encyclopædia Britannica, Eleventh Edition "[it is] a work which has obtained greater authority than it deserves, being largely a compilation from various sources, composed after the events and abounding in errors".
- Annals, his work of greatest value, still remains in manuscript in Lord Bute's and Lord de la Warr's collections (Hist. Brit. Comm. III. Rep. pp202, 217; also Egerton Manuscripts Brit. Mus. 997, add. Manuscripts 4992, 4994); his Journal of the Swedish Embassy … was published in 1772 and re-edited by Henry Reeve in 1885 (add. Manuscripts 4902, 4991 and 4995 and Hist. Manuscripts Comm III. Rep. 190, 217)
- Notes on the King's Writ for Choosing Members of Parliament, published in 1766 (see also add. MSS. 4993)
- Memorials of the English Affairs, from the Suppos'd Expedition of Brute to This Island, to the End of the Reign of King James I, published in 1709
- Essays Ecclesiastical and Civil (1706)
- Quench Not the Spirit (1711)
- some theological treatises that remain in manuscript and several others that have been attributed to him.

== Sources ==
- Coates, Ben (2010). "Whitelocke, Bulstrode (1605-1675), of the Middle Temple, London; later of Fawley Court, Bucks.". In Thrush, Andrew; Ferris, John P. (eds.). The History of Parliament: the House of Commons 1604-1629 (online ed.). Cambridge University Press.
- Gribble, Francis Henry (1913). The Court of Christina of Sweden and the Later Adventures of the Queen in Exile. New York: M. Kennerley.
- Spalding, Ruth (1975). The Improbable Puritan. Faber & Faber.
- Stolpe, Sven (1966). Randall, Alec (ed.). Christina of Sweden. New York: Macmillan.
- Whitelocke, B. (1855) A Journal of the Swedish Embassy in the Years 1653 and 1654. Vol. I. Edited by C. Morton and H. Reeve. London: Longman, Brown, Green, & Longmans. Available at: https://upload.wikimedia.org/wikipedia/commons/3/30/A_journal_of_the_Swedish_embassy_in_the_years_1653_and_1654_%28IA_cu31924082465588%29.pdf?utm_source=commons.wikimedia.org&utm_campaign=index&utm_content=original.
- Whitelocke, B. (1855). A Journal of the Swedish Embassy in the Years 1653 and 1654 Vol. II Edited by C. Morton and H. Reeve. London: Longman, Brown, Green, & Longmans. Available at: https://books.google.ie/books?id=1NdJAAAAMAAJ&printsec=frontcover&source=gbs_book_other_versions_r&cad=2&redir_esc=y#v=onepage&q&f=false

Attribution:

- This article incorporates text from a publication now in the public domain: Firth, Charles Harding (1900). "Whitelocke, Bulstrode". In Lee, Sidney (ed.). Dictionary of National Biography. Vol. 61. London: Smith, Elder & Co. p. 110. Endnotes:
  - Annesley, Arthur, ed. (1682). Memorials of the English Affairs from the beginning of the Reign of Charles I...
  - Le Neve, Peter (1873). Le Neve's pedigrees of the knights made by King Charles II. London: Mitchell and Hughes.
  - Whitelocke, R.H. (1860). Memoirs Biographical and Historical of Bulstrode Whitelocke.

Political offices
Preceded by Sir Thomas Widdrington	Speaker of the House of Commons; 1657	Succeeded by Chaloner Chute
