= St Peter's Church, Cleasby =

Church in Cleasby, North Yorkshire, England

Coordinates: 54°30′45″N 1°37′00″W

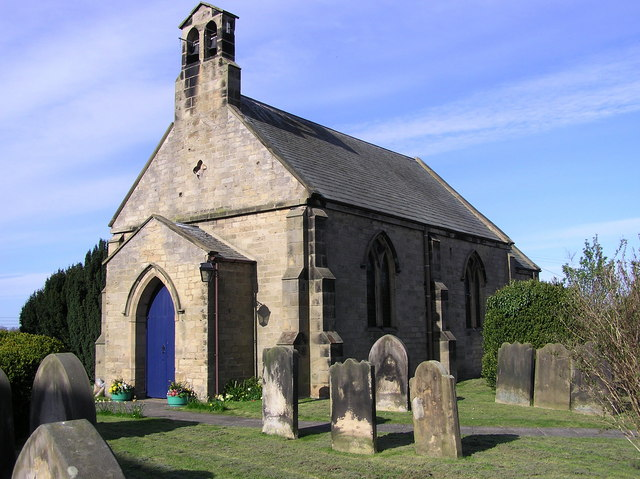
The church, in 2006

St Peter's Church is the parish church of Cleasby, a village in North Yorkshire, in England.

The first church on the site was described in 1823 as "a very ancient structure", but later as "small and inferior". It was largely demolished and rebuilt in 1828, retaining some of the original stonework. At the time, its dedication was unknown, but it was later rededicated to Saint Peter. It was restored in 1878, when the fittings were replaced. The church was Grade II listed in 1968.

The church is built of sandstone with a Westmorland slate roof. It consists of a nave with a west porch, and a chancel with a north vestry, and there is a bellcote on the west gable. At the west end are stepped buttresses, and a gabled porch containing a doorway with a pointed arch and a hood mould. Above the porch is an eaves band, and a quatrefoil in the gable. Inside, there is an early-20th century chancel screen incorporating a pulpit and reading desk. There is a 13th-century font which has been retooled and is on a newer plinth. There is a tablet recording the grant of Queen Anne's Bounty by John Robinson, Bishop of London, who was born in the parish. The south window of the chancel has yellow enamelled glass which was installed at Bristol Cathedral in 1710 and moved to Cleasby in 1906.

== See also ==
- Listed buildings in Cleasby
