= Philip Smythe =

Philip Smythe may refer to:

- Philip Smythe, 2nd Viscount Strangford, English politician
- Philip Smythe, 4th Viscount Strangford, Church of Ireland clergyman

== See also ==
- Phil Smyth, Australian basketball player and coach
