= Horace St Paul =

Horace St Paul may refer to:

- Horace St Paul (1729–1812), ambassador of Great Britain to Sweden 1776–1778
- Sir Horace St Paul, 1st Baronet (1775–1840), British soldier and politician
- Sir Horace St Paul, 2nd Baronet (1812–1891), British politician
