= High Sheriff of County Cork =

The Sheriff (later High Sheriff) of County Cork was an official in County Cork from the county's creation in the early 13th century until the creation of the Irish Free State in 1922. Within each Irish county, the high sheriff was the primary judicial representative of the English (later British) monarch, who was Lord of Ireland, later King/Queen of Ireland, and finally monarch of the United Kingdom of Great Britain and Ireland. In 1608, Cork city was made a county corporate separate from County Cork, after which separate sheriffs of Cork City were appointed by the city corporation.

== 13th to 16th centuries ==
- 1319: John FitzSimon
- 1343: Nicholas de Barry
- 1344: David Barry, 5th Lord Barry
- 1352: John Lumbard
- 1355: John Lumbard
- 1358: John Lumbard
- 1377: John Warner
- 1386: Robert Thame
- 1400: Robert Cogan
- 1401: John Barry, 7th Lord Barry
- 1403–1415: John Barry, 7th Lord Barry
- 1433: William Barry, 8th Lord Barry
- 1451: William Barry, 8th Lord Barry
- 1461: William Barry, 8th Lord Barry
- 1568-1570: Sir Richard Grenville
- 1580: Cormack MacTeige

== 17th century ==
- 1603: Sir Francis Kingsmill
- 1604: Sir Francis Kingsmill
- 1607: Sir Francis Kingsmill
- 1609: Edward Percy
- 1611: Sir Thomas Brown
- 1612–13: Piers Power
- 1613: Sir Thomas Southall
- 1614: William Booley
- 1616: Samuel Norton
- 1617: William Galwey
- 1620: Callaghan O'Callaghan
- 1621: Sir John Fitzgerald
- 1622: Sir Thomas Fitzgerald
- 1625: Richard Boyle, 1st Earl of Cork
- 1627: James Daunt, of Tracton Abbey
- 1634: Edmond Fitzgerald
- 1636: Daniel McCarthy Reagh
- 1641: John Long of Mount Long
- 1641: Francis Roche
- 1642: William Supple
- 1645: Thomas Daunt of Gortigrenane and Owlpen Manor
- 1657: John Hodder of Bridgetown
- 1661: William Hodder of Coolmoor
- 1664: Redmond Barry
- 1665: Richard Aldworth
- 1669: John Wyddenham
- 1670: Arthur Hyde of Castle Hyde
- 1671-1672: Richard Townsend of Castle Townsend
- 1673: Phineas Bury
- 1673: William Thornhill
- 1674: Roger Osborne
- 1675: William Harmer, jnr
- 1676: Francis Bernard
- 1677: Sir Emanuel Moore, 1st Baronet
- 1677: Christopher Crofts
- 1678: Richard Hull
- 1679: Epinetus Cross
- 1680: John Folliott
- 1681: William Supple
- 1682: Richard Travers
- 1683: John Folliott
- 1684: Arthur Hide
- 1685: Arthur Hide
- 1686: Lawrence Clayton
- 1687: William Coppinger
- 1687–88: Nicholas Browne
- 1689: Pierce Nagle of Anakisha
- 1690: Robert Foulkes
- 1692: Boyle Aldworth
- 1693: Simon Dring
- 1693: John Folliott
- 1694: Percy Freke of Rathbarry (afterwards Castle Freke)
- 1695: John St Leger
- 1696: Digby Foulkes
- 1697: Arthur Bernard
- 1698: Thomas Hodder

== 18th century ==
- 1700: John Barry
- 1701: Laurence Clayton
- 1702: Francis Foulkes/Richard Cox
- 1703: Richard Cox/ William Supple
- 1704: John Browne
- 1705: William Supple
- 1706: Arthur Bernard
- 1707: John Silver
- 1708: Bartholomew Purdon
- 1709: Ralph Freke
- 1710: Arthur Hyde
- 1711: James Worth Tynte of Ballycrenane /Richard Cox
- 1712: George Crofts
- 1713: Richard Cox of Dunmanway
- 1714: Sir Matthew Deane, 3rd Baronet of Dromore
- 1715: Richard Croker
- 1716: Gersham Herrick
- 1717: Anthony Jephson
- 1718: William Maynard of Carriglass
- 1719: Edward Corker
- 1720: Randolph Clayton
- 1721: Redmond Barry of Rathcormack
- 1722: John Fitzgerald
- 1723: William Casaubon
- 1724: Richard Aldworth
- 1725: John Colthurst
- 1726: Richard Townsend
- 1727: Richard Cox of Dunmanway
- 1728: Hon. David John Barry of Mahona
- 1729: Roger Bernard
- 1730: Noblett Dunscombe
- 1731: Robert Bettesworth
- 1732: John Lysaght
- 1733: John Rogers of Ashgrove
- 1734: Redmond Barry of Ballyclough
- 1735: Anthony Jephson
- 1736: Nicholas Colthurst
- 1737: Richard Newman
- 1738: John Colthurst, later Sir John Colthurst, 1st Baronet
- 1739: Richard Smyth of Ballynatray
- 1739: Thomas Evans of Miltown
- 1740: Anthony Jephson
- 1741: Edward Herrick of Shippool
- 1742: Samuel Townshend
- 1743: Edmond Supple of Supplescourt
- 1744: Samuel Hutchinson of Bantry
- 1745: Boyle Aldworth
- 1746: Hugh Lumley of Ballymaloe
- 1747: James Colthurst
- 1748: William Jephson
- 1749: Samuel Daunt of Knocknasillagh
- 1749: Daniel Laurence
- 1750: James Lombard of Lombardstown
- 1751: Richard Uniacke of Mount Uniacke
- 1752: Sir Robert Warren, 1st Baronet of Kilbarry
- 1753: Richard Townsend of Castle Townsend
- 1754: John Lysaght of Mount North
- 1755: Philip Oliver
- 1756: Robert Rogers of Lota
- 1757: John Lysaght, jnr
- 1758: Richard Longfield of Castlemary
- 1759: William Warren of Hollyhill
- 1760: Abraham Morris of Hanoverhall
- 1761: Wallis Colthurst of Cork
- 1762: Abraham Devonsher of Kilshannick
- 1763: Walter Baldwin of Mount Pleasant
- 1764: Emanuel Moore of Maryboro
- 1765: Nicholas Dunscombe of Mount Desert
- 1766: Walter Aikin of Levingtown
- 1767: Roger Bernard of Palace-Anne
- 1768: Nicholas Lysaght of Carriglass
- 1769: Jonas Morris of Barley Hill
- 1770: Hon. John S Barry of Ann-Grove
- 1771: Benjamin Bousfield of Aghadown
- 1772: John Wallis of Westwood
- 1773: Sir Robert Tilson Deane, 6th Baronet of Dromore
- 1774: Massey Hutcheson
- 1775: Matthew Freeman, died and replaced by John Longfield of Longueville
- 1776: James Uniacke
- 1777: Henry Baldwin
- 1778: William Wrixon
- 1779: William Wrixon
- 1780: John Martin of Blackrock
- 1780: Hon. Hayes St Leger
- 1781: Sir James Laurence Cotter, 2nd Baronet of Rockforest
- 1782: Abraham Morris of Hanover Hall
- 1783: William Chetwynd of Cork
- 1784: Thomas Hungerford
- 1785: Richard Boyle Townsend of Castle Townsend
- 1786: Sir Broderick Chinnery, 1st Baronet of Flintfield
- 1787: William W. Newenham
- 1788: Sir Nicholas Colthurst, 3rd Baronet of Ardun
- 1789: George Dunscombe of Mount Desert
- 1790: Joseph Capel
- 1791: Arthur O'Connor
- 1792: Nicholas G Evans, jnr
- 1793: Kilner Brooke Brasier
- 1794: John Wallis
- 1795: Robert Hedges
- 1796: Augustus Louis Carre Warren, later Sir Augustus Warren, 2nd Baronet
- 1797: Edward Deane-Freeman of Castle Cor
- 1798: Samuel Townsend of Whitehall
- 1799: Samuel Swete

== 19th century ==
- 1800: Henry Puxley
- 1801: Robert M'Carthy
- 1802: Richard Thomas Orpen
- 1803: Robert William Delacour of Beare Forest
- 1804: William Wrixon Beecher
- 1805: John Travers
- 1806: John Anderson
- 1807: Richard Townsend
- 1808: John Hyde of Castle Hyde
- 1809: Justin McCarty
- 1810: Michael Gould Adams
- 1811: Joshua Deane-Freeman of Castle Cor
- 1812: Hon Hayes St Leger
- 1813: William Baldwin
- 1814: Henry Wallis of Drishane Castle
- 1815: John Michael Wrixon
- 1816: Savage French
- 1817: John Townsend
- 1818: Jemmett Browne
- 1819: Augustus Warren, later Sir Augustus Warren, 3rd Baronet
- 1820: Hon. William Smyth Bernard
- 1821: Henry Greene Barry of Ballyclough
- 1822: Wills George Crofts
- 1823: William H. W. Newenham
- 1824: Robert Uniacke FitzGerald, of Lisquinlan
- 1825: J. Smith Barry of Foaty
- 1826: George Courtenay of Dromadda
- 1827: Simon Dring of Rockgrove
- 1828: Michael Creagh, of Kilbrack, of Doneraile.
- 1829: John Longfield of Longueville
- 1830: Garrett Standish Barry of Leamlara
- 1830: Richard Townsend of Saros
- 1831: John Hyde, jnr of Castle Hyde
- 1832: Richard Oliver Aldworth of Newmarket Court
- 1833: Richard Longfield of Longueville (son of John, HS 1829)
- 1834: William Hare, 2nd Earl of Listowel
- 1835: Richard White, 2nd Earl of Bantry
- 1836: Hon. Robert Henry King of Mitchelstown Castle
- 1837: Sir George Goold, 2nd Baronet
- 1838: Richard White
- 1839: John Isaac Heard of Kinsale and Ballydaly
- 1840: John Capel Fitzgerald of Cloghroe, died and replaced by Horatio Townsend
- 1841: James Barry of Ballyclough
- 1842: Robert Delacour Beamish
- 1843: Hon. Arthur Grove-Annesley
- 1844: Sir Edward Synge, 3rd Baronet of Kiltrough.
- 1845: Hon. Hayes St. Leger of Doneraile House.
- 1846: Edward Deane-Freeman.
- 1848: William Hedges-White of Bantry House.
- 1849: Viscount Kilworth, of Moore Park, Kilworth.
- 1850: Sir George Conway Colthurst, 5th Baronet of Ardum Inniscarra.
- 1851: Sir James Charles Chatterton, 3rd Baronet.
- 1852: John Courteney of Bally Edmond and Barrymagooly.
- 1854: John McCarthy O'Leary.
- 1855: Mountifort Longfield of Castle Mary.
- 1856: Alexander M'Carthy of Currymount, Buttevant.
- 1857: John Wallis.
- 1858: Thomas St John Grant of Kilmurry, Kilworth.
- 1859:
- 1860: Nicholas Dunscombe of Mount Desert, Cork.
- 1861: William Johnson of Vosterburg.
- 1862: Simon Dring.
- 1863: Thomas Somerville of Drishane.
- 1864: James Morrogh.
- 1865: Henry Lavallin Puxley of Dunboy Castle.
- 1867: Sir Augustus Riversdale Warren, 5th Baronet.
- 1867: Sir John Wrixon-Becher.
- 1868: Richard Wallis Goold-Adams.
- 1869: Richard William Aldworth of Newmarket Court.
- 1870: Robert Heard of Kinsale and Pallastown.
- 1871: Edmund Anderson Shuldham of Dunmanway.
- 1873: Edward FitzEdmund Burke Roche, 2nd Baron Fermoy.
- 1874: John Adam Richard Newman of Dromore House.
- 1875: James Francis Bernard, 4th Earl of Bandon
- 1880: John Harold-Barry of Ballyvonare.
- 1882: Sir James Laurence Cotter, 4th Baronet.
- 1883: Stephen Grehan.
- 1884: Sir George St John Colthurst, 6th Baronet.
- 1885: Phineas Bury.
- 1886: Arthur Smith-Barry, 1st Baron Barrymore.
- 1887: Richard Edmund Longfield of Longueville.
- 1888: Thomas Henry Somerville of Drishane.
- 1889: Henry Winthrop O'Donovan, The O'Donovan.
- 1891: Joseph Pike of Besborough.
- 1892: Morgan William O'Donovan, The O'Donovan.
- 1893: Richard Nason Woodley of Leades House.
- 1894: Reginald Bence-Jones of Lisselen.
- 1898: John Pretyman Newman of Newberry Manor and Kilshannig House.
- 1899: William Henry John Moore-Hodder of Hoddersfield.

== 20th century ==
- 1900: William de Wilton Roche of Aghada Hall.
- 1901: Robert Massey Dawson Sanders.
- 1902: William Johnson of Rockenham.
- 1903: Edward Egerton Leigh-White of Bantry House.
- 1904: Anthony Hickman Morgan.
- 1905:
- 1906: Mountifort Longfield of Timoleague.
- 1907: William Cooke-Collis.
- 1908: William Nicholas Leader of Rosnalee and Dromagh Castle.
- 1909: Lt-Col Mountifort John Courteney Longfield of Castle Mary.
- 1910: James Robert Bury-Barry of Ballyclough.
- 1911: Robert Frederick Wilkinson of Carrokeal, Mallow.
- 1912: John Charles Oliver Aldworth of Newmarket Court.
- 1913: William Tower Townshend of Myross Wood, Leap.
- 1914: Sir James Laurence Cotter, 5th Bt., formerly of Rockforest.
- 1915:
- 1919: Arthur Chaloner Goold-Adams.
- 1920: Henry Green Barry.
- 1921: Matthew Henry Franks of Montrath, Queen's County.

== See also ==
- Lord Lieutenant of County Cork, British monarch's military representative
- Cork County Council, local authority since 1899
