= Denham Jephson =

Denham Jephson may refer to:

- Denham Jephson (died 1781) (c. 1721–1781), MP for Mallow
- Denham Jephson (died 1813) (c. 1748–1813), MP for Mallow

== See also ==
- Denham Jephson-Norreys (1799–1888), MP for Mallow
