= List of ambassadors of the Kingdom of England to Sweden =

Ambassador of the Kingdom of England to Sweden
- Coat of Arms of England
- Style: His Excellency
- Residence: Stockholm
- Appointer: The monarch
- Final holder: Dr John Robinson, Chargé d'Affaires

The ambassador of the Kingdom of England to Sweden was the foremost diplomatic representative of the historic Kingdom of England in Sweden, before the creation of the Kingdom of Great Britain in 1707. The title was more often Envoy extraordinary than ambassador. (The first two on this list, Bulstrode Whitelocke and William Jephson, in fact represented Oliver Cromwell's Commonwealth of England which at the time displaced the Monarchy.)

The position was not always a continuous or permanent one, and there was sometimes no diplomatic representation between the two countries.

For ambassadors from the Court of St. James's to Sweden after the creation of the Kingdom of Great Britain in 1707, see List of ambassadors of Great Britain to Sweden.

== Envoys Extraordinary of England ==
- 1653–1654: Bulstrode Whitelocke
- 1657: William Jephson
- 1664–1666: Hon. Henry Coventry
- 1671: Hon. Henry Coventry
- c. 1672–1679: Sir Edward Wood
- 1679–1680: Dr John Robinson as Chargé d'Affaires
- 1680–1683: Philip Warwick
- 1683–1687: Dr John Robinson Agent
- 1687–1689: Edmund Poley
- 1689–1692: William Duncombe Envoy extraordinary
- 1692–1707: Dr John Robinson as Chargé d'Affaires 1692-1694; Agent 1694-1696; Minister Resident 1696-1702; then Envoy Extraordinary; continued to represent Great Britain until 1709
  - 1702: George Stepney Envoy Extraordinary (did not go)

== After the Union of England and Scotland ==
In 1707 the Kingdom of England became part of the new Kingdom of Great Britain. For missions from the court of St James's after 1707, see the list of ambassadors of Great Britain to Sweden.
