= Anthony Jephson =

Anthony Jephson may refer to:

- Anthony Jephson (died 1755), MP for Mallow
- Anthony Jephson (died 1794), MP for Mallow
