= Philip Smythe, 4th Viscount Strangford =

Irish peer and Anglican priest

Philip Sydney Smyth (14 March 1715 – 29 April 1787) was a Church of Ireland clergyman and fourth Viscount Strangford in the Peerage of Ireland. He succeeded to the viscountcy on 8 September 1724.

== Career ==
=== Ecclesiastical ===
He was educated at Trinity College, Dublin. King George II appointed him Dean of St. Patrick's Cathedral, Dublin in 1746 but the chapter successfully argued that the Crown was not the patron, and he was dispossessed. He was successively Prebendary of Killaspugmullane in Cork Cathedral; Precentor of Elphin (1746–52); Dean of Derry (1752–69); and Archdeacon of Derry (1769–74).

=== Political ===
He sat in the Irish House of Lords until 1784, when he was excluded by Act of Parliament after being tried and convicted of corruption for soliciting a bribe of £200 from the applicant in a court case that was pending before the House. The scandal was exacerbated by the fact that it came less than two years after the Irish Lords had regained final appellate jurisdiction from the British House of Lords.

== Family ==
In 1741 Strangford married Mary, daughter of Anthony Jephson, MP for Mallow They had six children: Mary-Anne (1745–1823) and Anne-Philippa (1749–1830), both unmarried; Robert, Philip, and Frances, who all died young; and finally Lionel (1753–1801), who also took holy orders before succeeding as 5th Viscount.

Peerage of Ireland
Preceded by Endymion Smythe	Viscount Strangford; 1724–1787	Succeeded by Lionel Smythe
