= Anthony Jephson (died 1794) =

Irish politician

Anthony Jephson (after 1748 – June 1794) was an Irish Member of Parliament.

== Biography ==
He was a younger son of Denham Jephson of Mallow Castle and his wife Frances, daughter of Sir John Aubrey, 3rd Baronet. Following the death of his father in 1781, his elder brother Denham nominated him as Member of Parliament for the family borough of Mallow, but he was replaced by Sir James Cotter at the general election in 1783.
