= Selwyn Jephson =

English cricketer and Royal Navy officer

Captain Selwyn Jephson
- Born: 24 May 1900; Beaminster, Dorset, England
- Died: 6 November 1978 (aged 78); Salisbury, Wiltshire, England
- Military career
- Allegiance: United Kingdom
- Branch: Royal Navy
- Service years: 1916–1950
- Rank: Captain
- Commands: HMS Mackay; HMS Southdown
- Conflicts: First World War; Second World War
- Awards: Order of Polonia Restituta
- Cricket career

Personal information
- Batting: Right-handed
- Bowling: Right-arm fast-medium
- Relatives: William Jephson (father)

Domestic team information
- Years: Team
- 1920–1931: Dorset

Career statistics
Competition	First-class
Matches	4
Runs scored	49
Batting average	7.00
100s/50s	–/–
Top score	14
Balls bowled	761
Wickets	6
Bowling average	70.16
5 wickets in innings	–
10 wickets in match	–
Best bowling	2/73
Catches/stumpings	2/–
- Source: Cricinfo, 4 October 2018

Selwyn Victor Jephson (24 May 1900 – 6 November 1978) was an English first-class cricketer and Royal Navy officer.

== Early life and naval career ==
Jephson was born at Beaminster in May 1900 to Mary Margaret Jephson and her husband, the cricketer William Jephson. In May 1913, he was accepted into the Royal Naval College, Osborne. He completed his naval training in 1916, entering service with the rank of midshipman. He was made an Acting Sub Lieutenant in May 1918, with full promotion Sub Lieutenant following in February 1919.

Selwyn debuted for Dorset in minor counties cricket in 1920. He was made a lieutenant in February 1921, He made his debut in first-class cricket for the Royal Navy Cricket Club against the Army at Lord's in 1924. He played a further three first-class matches for the Royal Navy, against the touring New Zealanders at Portsmouth in 1927, and in two inter-services matches in 1928 against the Army and the Royal Air Force. He scored 49 runs in his four first-class matches, and took six wickets. Having held the rank of lieutenant for seven years, Jephson was promoted to lieutenant commander in June 1928. His naval commitments limited his availability to play minor counties cricket for Dorset, with Jephson making seven appearances in the Minor Counties Championship from 1920 to 1931.

== Later naval career and WWII ==
He married Gertrude Margaret Hambro in September 1933, with the couple later having one daughter. The following year in June, he was promoted to commander. During World War II, Jephson was promoted to captain, and in December 1942 he received the Order of Polonia Restituta for services to the Polish Navy in exile. He commanded HMS Mackay from July 1942 to November 1943, and briefly was seconded to command HMS Southdown from August–September 1942. He retired from service in January 1950, and was placed on the retired list. Prior to his retirement, he had served as the naval aide-de-camp to George VI.

He died at Salisbury in November 1978, having lived in Hambledon, Hampshire, for some years prior to his death.
