= James Jeffreys (diplomat) =

Anglo-Irish soldier and diplomat

James Bavington Jeffreys (c. 1679 – 1739), also recorded as Jeffereys, was an Anglo-Irish soldier and diplomat who served as Minister Resident of the Kingdom of Great Britain to Sweden and Russia.

== Biography ==
Jeffreys was born in Stockholm, Sweden, the eldest son of Sir James Jeffreys and his Swedish wife Katherine Drokenhellem. He was educated at Trinity College Dublin from 1697 to 1701 while his father was Governor of Cork. He returned to Sweden in 1702 and became an agent in the service of Dr John Robinson, the English representative in Stockholm.

On 12 April 1706 Jeffreys received a captaincy in the army of Queen Anne, after his father petitioned the Duke of Marlborough on his son's behalf. In the spring of 1707, he was authorised by Anne to become a volunteer in the army of Charles XII of Sweden and participated in the Swedish invasion of Russia. Jeffreys was captured by the Russians following the Battle of Poltava on 8 July 1709, but released the same year.

He remained in Sweden as British Minister to Sweden from 1711 to 1715. He was appointed the British Minister Resident to Russia between 1718 and 1719. George I reconfirmed his commission in the army in 1719, but between 1719 and 1722 he served as the British resident in Danzig. Jeffreys was appointed Governor of Cork, in succession to his father, in 1722 and moved to the family estate at Blarney Castle near Cork. He married Anne Brodick, the daughter of St John Brodrick, and was the father of James St John Jeffereyes. He died abroad in 1739.
