= Bantry House =

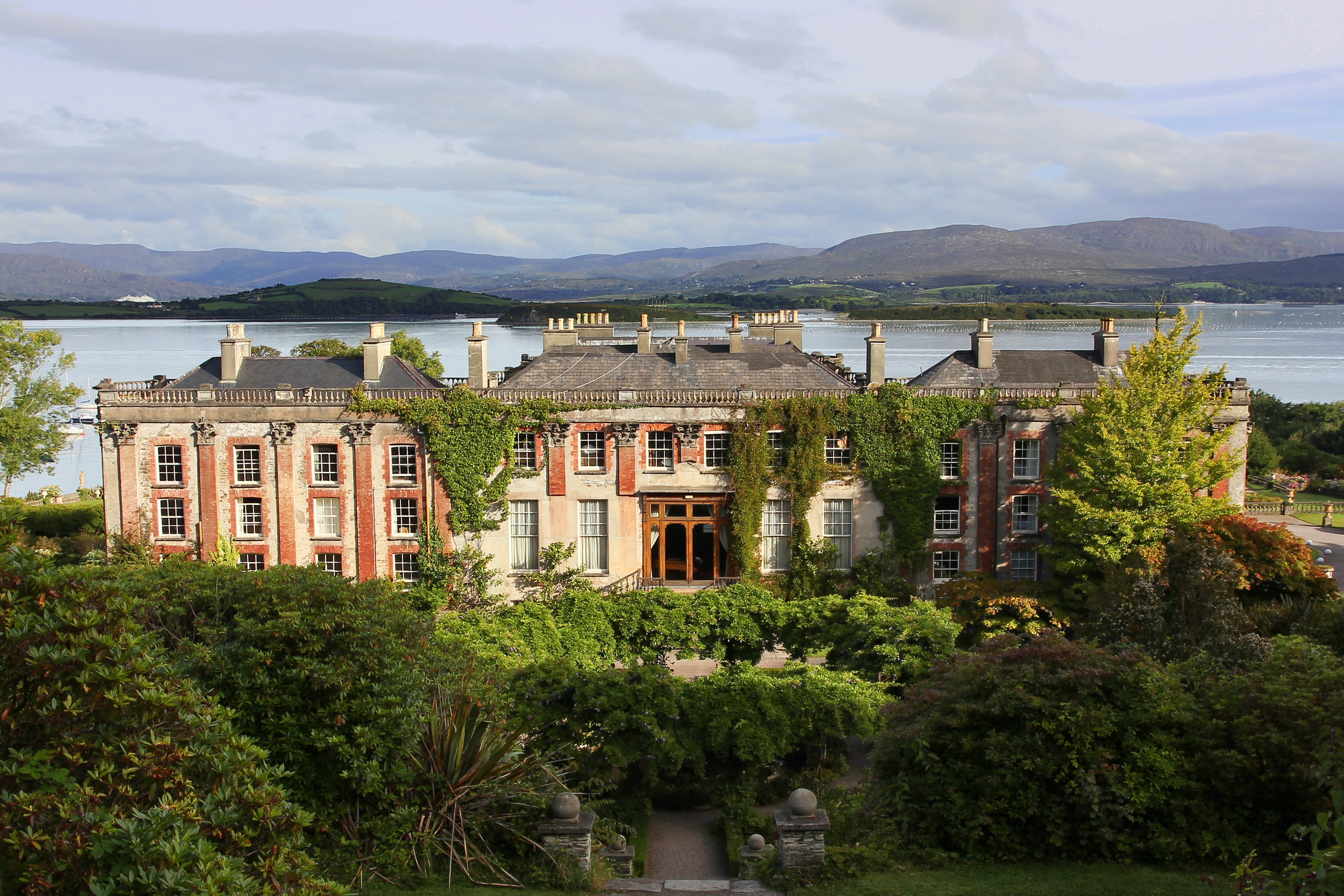
- Bantry House and Bantry Bay

- Location within Ireland

General information
- Architectural style: Queen Anne with Georgian and Victorian additions
- Location: Bantry, Ireland
- Coordinates: 51.677°N 9.465°W
- Completed: c.1710 (original house) c.1820 (additions) c.1845 (wings)

Website
- bantryhouse.com

Bantry House is a historic house with gardens in Bantry, County Cork, Ireland. Originally built in the early 18th century, it has been owned and occupied by the White family (formerly Earls of Bantry) since the mid-18th century. Opened to the public since the 1940s, the house, estate and gardens are a tourist destination in West Cork.

== History ==
Bantry House (originally called 'Blackrock') was constructed in about 1710 on the south side of Bantry Bay. In 1750, Councillor Richard White bought Blackrock from Samuel Hutchinson and changed the name to 'Seafield'.

The Whites had settled on Whiddy Island across the bay in the late 17th century, after having originally been merchants in Limerick. The family prospered and considerable purchases of land were made in the area surrounding the house. By the 1780s, Bantry House comprised approximately 80,000 acres (32,000 ha), though much of this would not be arable.

The house has been open to tourism since 1946.

In 2012, Bantry House featured on an episode of Country House Rescue.

== Gardens ==
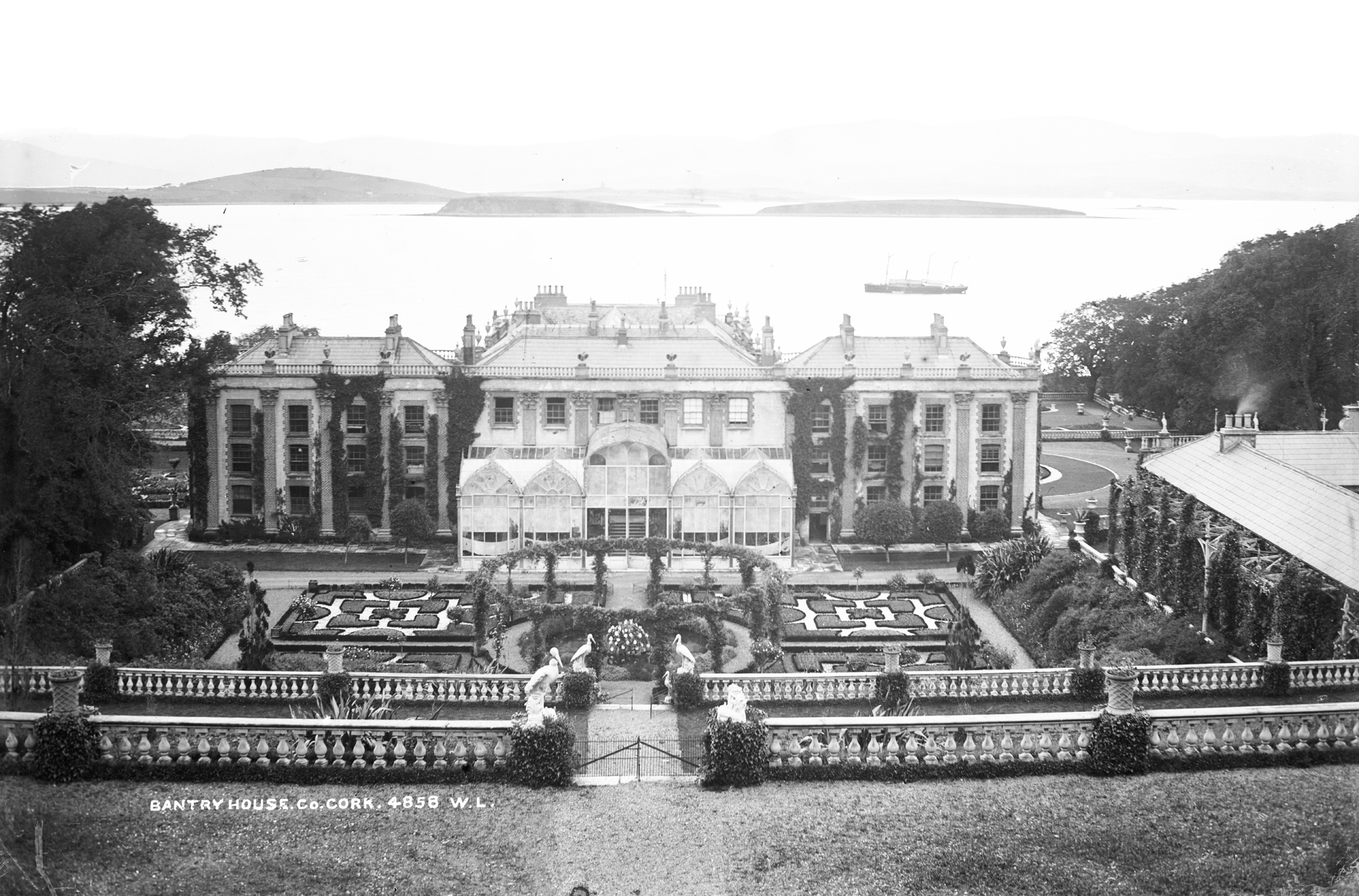
The house and gardens in 1895. The conservatory no longer exists.

The gardens to Bantry House were developed by Richard White, 2nd Earl of Bantry and his wife Mary. The gardens contain seven terraces; the house is located on the third. One hundred steps are located behind the house and fountain, and are surrounded by azaleas and rhododendrons.

By 1997 the grounds of Bantry House were suffering from neglect in certain places. A European grant was obtained to start the restoration process. Funding ceased in 2000, although subsequent grants were obtained from the Irish Department of Housing and Heritage in 2022 and 2023. As of summer 2024, the restoration work was still ongoing.

== Armada centre ==
An exhibition on the role Bantry House played in the United Irishmen Rebellion was opened in the courtyard of the house ahead of the rebellion's bi-centenary. The exhibition was designed to cover the French expedition to Ireland in 1796, and the role of Richard White, then owner of the house and later 1st Earl of Bantry, in opposing the attempted landings. Ultimately the French armada never landed, as severe weather resulted in the loss of several ships – including the frigate Surveillante. The Armada Centre contained a scale model of the Surveillante and several artifacts recovered from its wreck.

== See also ==
- Earl of Bantry
- Historic Cork Gardens
- West Cork Chamber Music Festival
