= Anglo-Swedish Alliance =

1654 alliance between England and Sweden

The Anglo-Swedish Alliance was signed by Bulstrode Whitelocke, representing the Commonwealth of England, and Christina, Queen of Sweden, in Uppsala, Sweden in 1654. Its main purpose was to offset the alliance between Denmark and the Netherlands. It was signed on 28 April, but antedated 11 April.
