= Cleasby =

Village and civil parish in North Yorkshire, England

Coordinates: 54°30′43″N 1°36′53″W

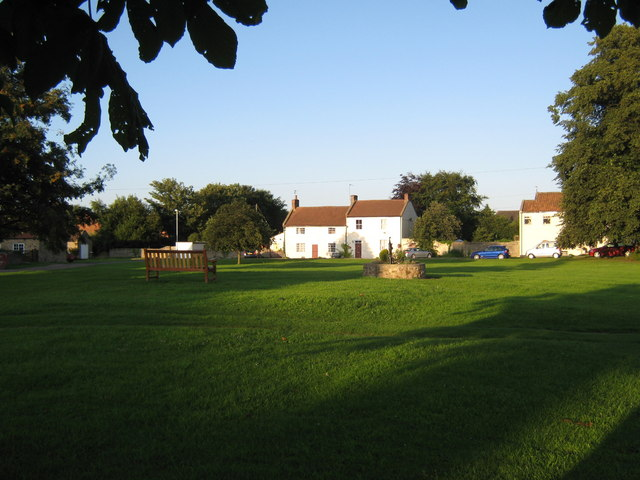
- Cleasby Village Green

- Location within North Yorkshire
- Population: 208 (Including Newton Morrell. 2011)
- OS grid reference: NZ250130
  - London: 215 mi (346 km) S
- Unitary authority: North Yorkshire
- Ceremonial county: North Yorkshire
- Region: Yorkshire and the Humber
- Country: England
- Sovereign state: United Kingdom
- Post town: DARLINGTON
- Postcode district: DL2
- Police: North Yorkshire
- Fire: North Yorkshire
- Ambulance: Yorkshire
- UK Parliament: Richmond and Northallerton

Cleasby is a village and civil parish in the county of North Yorkshire, England. It is close to the River Tees and Darlington and the A1(M). The population at the 2011 Census of ONS was 208.

== History ==
The village is mentioned in the Domesday Book as "Clesbi". The manor had been the possession of a local named Thor, but passed to Enisant Mussard after the Norman invasion. The mesne lordship passed to the lords of Constable Burton from Enisant which eventually ended in the hands of the Scrope family. Enisant continued to hold a demesne lordship here which passed to Harsculph an ancestor of the Cleasby family. By the early fourteenth century the direct line of inheritance had ended and the manor passed to the Fitz Hugh family of Ravensworth who held it until the middle of the sixteenth century when it passed to the Crown. In 1602 the manor was granted to Peter Bradwell and Robert Parker. From thereon it passed via the Countess of Shrewsbury to the Duke of Devonshire. By the mid-nineteenth century it had passed into the hands of John Church Backhouse.

The origin of the name of the village is uncertain. Most sources claim it to be the combination of a personal name, Kleiss and the Old Norse -by for farm, giving Kleiss' farm.

== Governance ==
The village lies within the Richmond and Northallerton UK Parliament constituency. It also lies within the Richmondshire North electoral division of North Yorkshire Council and the Barton ward.

From 1974 to 2023 it was part of the district of Richmondshire, it is now administered by the unitary North Yorkshire Council.

== Geography ==
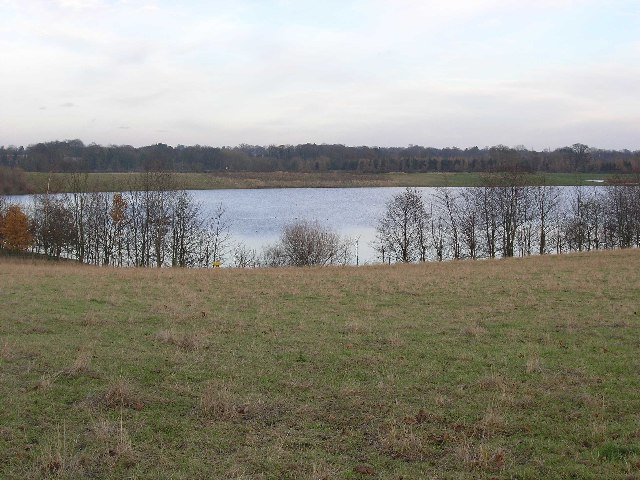
Flooded gravel quarry near Cleasby

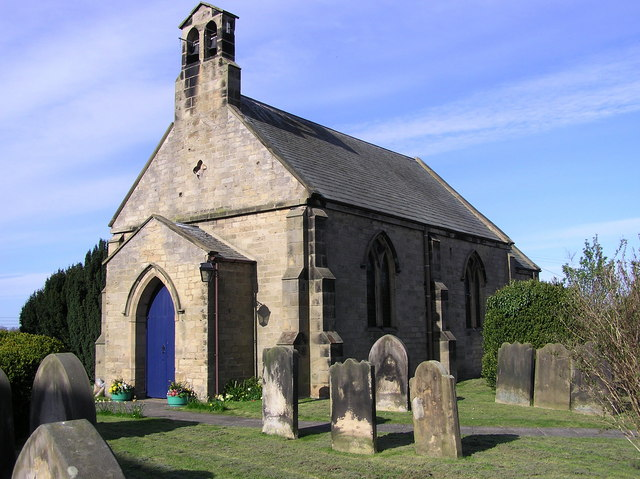
St Peter's Church, Cleasby with Stapleton

The village lies in a bend in the River Tees just 0.4 miles (0.64 km) away. It is also 0.2 miles (0.32 km) from the A1(M) and 0.6 miles (0.97 km) from the A66(M). The nearest settlements are Stapleton 0.8 miles (1.3 km) to the south-east and Darlington 2.3 miles (3.7 km) to the north-east. The geology of the area surrounding the village lies on a bed of limestone overlaid with loam, clay and gravel. The latter having been quarried nearby.

== Demography ==
Population
Year	1801	1811	1821	1831	1841	1851	1881	1891	1901	1911	1921	1931	1951	1961	2001	2011
Total	123	124	147	162	188	197	178	136	154	165	164	165	142	139	176	208

=== 2001 census ===
The 2001 UK census showed that the population was split 47.1% male to 52.9% female. The religious constituency was made of 77.8% Christian, 1.7% Sikh and the rest stating no religion or not stating at all. The ethnic make-up was 94.9% White British, 3.4% White Other/Irish, and 1.7% British Asian. There were 77 dwellings.

=== 2011 census ===
The 2011 UK census showed that the population was split 52.9% male to 47.1% female. The religious constituency was made of 76.9% Christian with the rest stating no religion or not stating at all. The ethnic make-up was 94.7% White British, 1.4% White Other/Irish, 2.4% Mixed Ethnic, 0.96% Black British and 0.48% British Asian. There were 87 dwellings.

== Religion ==
St Peter's Church, Cleasby, was built in 1828 and was originally undedicated to any particular Saint. It is a Grade II listed building.

== Notable people ==
John Robinson (1650–1723), bishop of London and diplomatist was born and attended school there. He was the son of a cooper in the village. He was Ambassador to Sweden for twenty five years before becoming Lord Privy Seal and then first Plenipotentiary to the Congress of Utrecht.

== See also ==
- Listed buildings in Cleasby
