= Listed buildings in Cleasby =

Cleasby is a civil parish in the county of North Yorkshire, England. It contains seven listed buildings that are recorded in the National Heritage List for England. All the listed buildings are designated at Grade II, the lowest of the three grades, which is applied to "buildings of national importance and special interest". The parish contains the village of Cleasby and the surrounding area. All the listed buildings are in the village, and consist of a church, a village hall and houses.

== Buildings ==
| Name and location | Photograph | Date | Notes |
|---|---|---|---|
| Cleasby Hall; 54.51237°N 1.61768°W | — | 15th century | A manor house that has been much altered, it is in roughcast stone, and has a pantile roof with stone slates at the eaves and stone coped gables. There are two storeys and an irregular plan. The windows are sashes, some with mullions. In the west front is a doorway with re-set moulded jambs and a lintel on large rounded corbels, and in the east front is a doorway with a rusticated quoined surround. |
| Teddington House; 54.51230°N 1.61708°W | — | Mid 17th century | The house is roughcast, and has a tile roof with stone coping. There are two storeys and three bays. The windows on the front are sashes, and at the rear are a cross window and a mullioned window, both chamfered. Inside, there is an inglenook fireplace. |
| The Old Vicarage; 54.51119°N 1.61495°W | — | 1717 | The vicarage, later a private house, has a rear range that is possibly earlier. The house is roughcast with stone dressings, chamfered rusticated quoins, and a roof with stone slate on the main range and tiles on the rear range, stone coping and shaped kneelers. There are two storeys and an attic, an L-shaped plan, a main range of three bays, and a rear range. The central doorway has a moulded surround, above which is a plaque with a coat of arms, a bishop's mitre, an inscription and the date. To the left of the doorway is a square bay window, the other windows on the front are sashes in architraves with cornices and sills on brackets, and in the rear range are casement windows. |
| House of Mr Scott; 54.51223°N 1.61442°W | — | Mid 18th century | The house on The Green is roughcast and has a two-span pantile roof. There are two storeys, two bays, and a rear range. In the centre is a doorway, the ground floor windows are multi-paned with opening casements, and in the upper floor are horizontally-sliding sashes. |
| Cleasby House; 54.51166°N 1.61419°W | — | Late 18th century | A house with a later service range to the right; the house is in brown brick with dentilled eaves, and a pantile roof with shaped kneelers and coping, and the service range rendered has an eaves band and a Welsh slate roof. The house has two storeys and a basement, and three bays. In the centre is a sandstone doorway with a Roman Doric doorcase, a fanlight with traceried glazing, and an open segmental pediment. The windows are sashes in architraves with flat brick arches. The service range has two storeys and four bays. In the left bay is a segmental-arched doorway that is partly blocked and a window inserted, in the right bay is a carriage entrance, and elsewhere are sash windows. |
| St Peter's Church; 54.51239°N 1.61668°W | | 1828 | The church, which was refitted in 1878, is in sandstone with a Westmorland slate roof. It consists of a nave with a west porch, and a chancel with a north vestry, and there is a bellcote on the west gable. At the west end are stepped buttresses, and a gabled porch containing a doorway with a pointed arch and a hood mould. Above the porch is an eaves band, and a quatrefoil in the gable. |
| Village hall 54.51167°N 1.61582°W | — | 1848 | Originally a school, the village hall is in white brick on a plinth, with stone dressings, quoins, and a Welsh slate roof. There is a single storey and a T-shaped plan, with three bays, the larger right bay projecting with oversailing eaves, a hipped roof, and a porch in the angle. The porch has a flat roof and square Tuscan columns, and the windows are mullioned. On the roof is a bellcote with a corniced stone base, and the opening with brick sides and a round-arched stone top, over which is a cornice and a coved lead roof. |
