= Richard White, 2nd Earl of Bantry =

Irish peer

The Right Honourable The Earl of Bantry

High Sheriff of County Cork
- In office 1835–1836
- Monarch: William IV
- Preceded by: William Hare, 2nd Earl of Listowel
- Succeeded by: Hon. Robert Henry King

Personal details
- Born: 16 November 1800 Bantry House, County Cork
- Died: 16 July 1868 (age 67) Exmoor House
- Spouse(s): Mary White, Countess of Bantry (née O'Brien)
- Parent(s): Richard White, 1st Earl of Bantry, Margaret Ann
- Education: Christ Church, Oxford
- Occupation: Author

Richard White, 2nd Earl of Bantry DL (16 November 1800 – 16 July 1868), styled The Honourable from birth until 1816 and subsequently Viscount Berehaven until 1851, was an Irish peer and Conservative politician.

He was the eldest son of Richard White, 1st Earl of Bantry and his wife Margaret Ann, daughter of William Hare, 1st Earl of Listowel. White was educated at Christ Church, Oxford. In 1851 he succeeded his father as earl, and three years later he was elected an Irish representative peer to the House of Lords, where he sat as a Conservative. White was High Sheriff of County Cork in 1835 and served as a Deputy Lieutenant of the same county.

On 11 October 1836, he married Mary, third daughter of William O'Brien, 2nd Marquess of Thomond at St George's, Hanover Square. White died, aged 67, childless at Exmoor House and was succeeded in his titles by his younger brother William.

Peerage of Ireland
Preceded by Richard White	Earl of Bantry; 1851 – 1868	Succeeded by William Hedges-White
Political offices
Preceded by The Viscount Doneraile	Representative peer for Ireland; 1854–1868	Succeeded by The Lord Headley
