= John Jephson (disambiguation) =

Sir John Jephson (died 1638) was an English soldier and MP for Hampshire and Petersfield.

John Jephson may also refer to:

- John Jephson (priest), Irish Anglican priest
- John Jephson (died 1693), Irish MP for Mallow
- John Jephson (died 1724), Irish MP for Blessington
