= Edmund Whitelocke =

English soldier, royal courtier and suspected conspirator (1565–1608)

Edmund Whitelocke (1565–1608) was an English soldier, royal courtier and suspected conspirator.

== Life ==
He was born in the parish of St. Gabriel, Fenchurch Street, London, on 10 February 1565, the eldest son of Richard Whitelocke, a merchant. The judge Sir James Whitelocke was a younger brother. After being educated at Merchant Taylors' School under Richard Mulcaster, he was sent to Christ's College, Cambridge, where he matriculated as a pensioner in November 1581, and graduated B.A. in 1585. His brother attests that he studied law at Lincoln's Inn.

At Whitsuntide 1587 Whitelocke left London on foreign tour. He visited universities in Germany, Italy, and France. Subsequently, he obtained a commission as captain of a troop of infantry from the governor of Provence (M. Desguieres), and was stationed successively at Marseille and Grenoble; he saw some active service during the civil wars in France. He returned to England in 1599, was in attendance at Elizabeth's court, and won a reputation for profuse display and dissolute living.

He was on terms of close intimacy with many of the younger nobility, including Roger Manners, 5th Earl of Rutland, and other followers of Robert Devereux, 2nd Earl of Essex. Rutland invited him to visit Essex's house in London on 30 Jan. 1601, the day fixed for the Earl of Essex's insurrection. He remained in the house only a few minutes, but he incurred a suspicion of disloyalty. He was arrested as an abettor of Essex's rebellion, and was indicted of high treason, but, though brought before the court of king's bench, was not tried, but allowed to go on parole before he obtained a final discharge. Subsequently, he came to know Henry Percy, 9th Earl of Northumberland, whom he supported in his quarrel with Sir Francis Vere in 1602. A challenge which Whitelocke carried from the earl to Sir Francis led to the issue of a warrant by the privy council for his arrest; but Whitelocke went into hiding, and escaped capture for the time.

He happened, however, to dine with the Earl of Northumberland and his kinsman Thomas Percy on 4 November 1605, the day before the Gunpowder Plot. Suspicion again fell on Whitelocke, and, with his host, suffered a long imprisonment in the Tower of London. No evidence was produced against him, and he was released without trial. While a prisoner in the Tower he spent much time with Northumberland, who granted him a pension. Another of Whitelocke's friends was Robert Radcliffe, 5th Earl of Sussex. John Manningham the diarist attributes to Whitelocke's influence Radcliffe's neglect of his wife. Whitelocke was on a visit to the Earl of Sussex at Newhall, Essex in the autumn of 1608 when he was taken ill and died. He was buried in the family tomb of his host at Boreham.
