= Richard White, 1st Earl of Bantry =

Anglo-Irish soldier and peer (1767–1851)

The Right Honourable The Earl of Bantry
- Born: August 6, 1767
- Died: May 2, 1851 (aged 83)
- Military career
- Conflicts: French expedition to Ireland (1796)

Richard White, 1st Earl of Bantry (6 August 1767 – 2 May 1851) was an Anglo-Irish soldier and peer.

White was born in a gentry family in Ireland. He was the son and heir of Simon White of Bantry by his wife Frances Jane Hedges, daughter of Richard Hedges of Macroom Castle. He was the grandson of Richard White, who had made an immense fortune through his work as a lawyer, and the family owned extensive estates in County Cork.

In 1797, White led forces loyal to the Kingdom of Great Britain against a French invasion force, which had landed at Bantry Bay in order to support Irish rebels in the lead up to the Irish Rebellion of 1798. For his loyalty to The Crown, he was created Baron Bantry in the Peerage of Ireland on 24 March 1797. He was also awarded a gold medal as a token of thanks from the City of Cork. He was further honoured on 29 December 1800, when he was created Viscount Bantry. Lord Bantry was awarded an earldom on 22 January 1816 when he was made Earl of Bantry and Viscount Beerhaven, both titles in the Peerage of Ireland. He lived at Bantry House, Cork.

He married Lady Margaret Anne Hare, the daughter of William Hare, 1st Earl of Listowel, on 3 November 1799. They had four children:

- Richard White, 2nd Earl of Bantry (1800–1868)
- William Hedges-White, 3rd Earl of Bantry (1801–1884)
- Hon. Simon White, an officer in the British Army (1807–1837)
- Hon. Lady Maria White (1805–1817)

Peerage of Ireland
New creation	Earl of Bantry; 1816–1851	Succeeded by Richard White
New creation	Viscount Bantry; 1800–1851	Succeeded by Richard White
New creation	Baron Bantry; 1797–1851	Succeeded by Richard White
