= Anthony Jephson (died 1755) =

Anthony Jephson (c. 1688/1689 – 28 December 1755) was an Irish soldier, landowner and Whig Member of Parliament.

The second son of Anthony Jephson of Mallow Castle, he was commissioned as a cornet in Lord Wharton's Regiment of Dragoons in 1710. He was placed on half-pay in 1713 and that year was elected to Parliament for the pocket borough of Mallow; he would sit for the borough until his death. In 1715 he was made captain in the Cork Militia, and was briefly a captain in Edmund Fielding's Regiment of Foot in February 1716 before becoming lieutenant-colonel of Lord Doneraile's Regiment of Dragoons later the same month. He was Deputy Governor of County Cork in 1716 and High Sheriff of the county in 1717, 1735 and 1740. In 1740 he also became colonel of his regiment.

Jephson was married in 1712 to Phillippa, daughter of William Wakeham of Barryscourt. They had several children, including Anthony, who married Hannah, daughter of Sir John Rogerson, Lord Chief Justice of Ireland; Denham, MP for Mallow; William, MP for Mallow; and Mary, who married Philip Smythe, 4th Viscount Strangford. In 1742 he married Catherine, daughter of Agmondisham Vesey; they had no children.
