= William Jephson (died 1698) =

Irish Member of Parliament

William Jephson (1665 – December 1698) was an Irish Member of Parliament.

== Biography ==
The only son of Colonel John Jephson and his wife Elizabeth, daughter of Francis Boyle, 1st Viscount Shannon, he inherited the family estate of Mallow Castle in 1693. He sat in the Irish House of Commons for Mallow from 1695. He had no children by his wife Anne, daughter of George Howard, 4th Earl of Suffolk, so on his death he was succeeded by his cousin William.
