= Earl of Bantry =

Title in the Peerage of Ireland

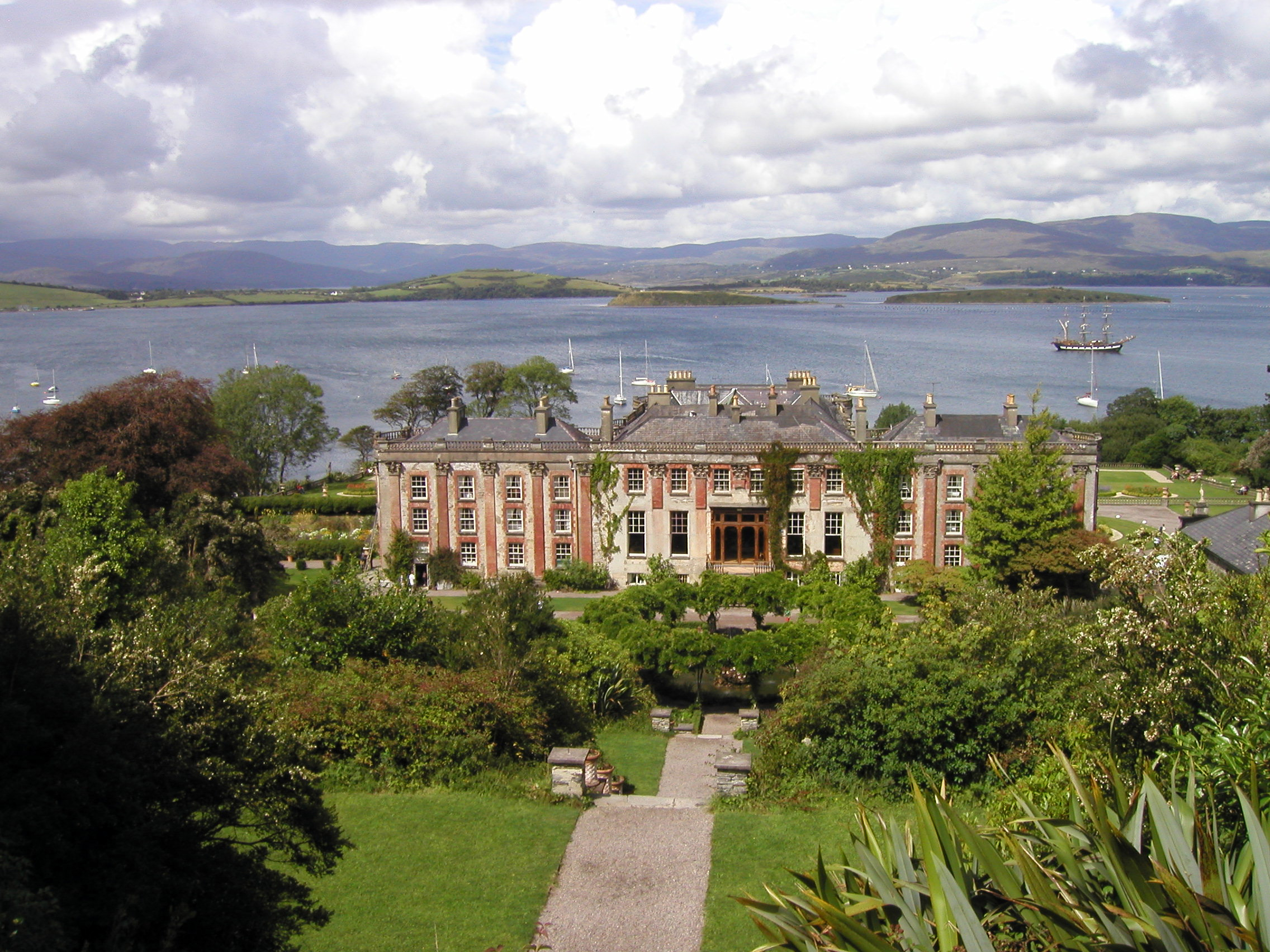
Bantry House, the seat of the Earls of Bantry.

Earl of Bantry, of Bantry in the County of Cork, was a title in the Peerage of Ireland. It was created in 1816 for Richard White, 1st Viscount Bantry, who had helped repelling the French invasion at Bantry Bay in 1797. He had already been created Baron Bantry, of Bantry in the County of Cork, in 1797, and Viscount Bantry, of Bantry in the County of Cork, in 1800, and was made Viscount Berehaven at the same time he was given the earldom. These titles were also in the Peerage of Ireland. He was the grandson of Richard White, who had made an immense fortune through his work as a lawyer. Lord Bantry was succeeded by his son, the second Earl. He sat on the Conservative benches in the House of Lords as an Irish representative peer from 1854 to 1868. His younger brother, the third Earl, assumed in 1840 by royal licence the additional surname of Hedges, which was that of his paternal grandmother. He was an Irish representative peer from 1869 to 1884. The titles became extinct on the death of his son, the fourth Earl, in 1891.

The family seat was Bantry House, near Bantry, in County Cork, Ireland. The house is still in the hands of the White family.

== Earls of Bantry (1816) ==
- Richard White, 1st Earl of Bantry (1767–1851)
- Richard White, 2nd Earl of Bantry (1800–1868)
- William Henry Hare Hedges-White, 3rd Earl of Bantry (1801–1884)
- William Henry Hare Hedges-White, 4th Earl of Bantry (1854–1891)
