= HMS Southdown (L25) =

Destroyer of the Royal Navy

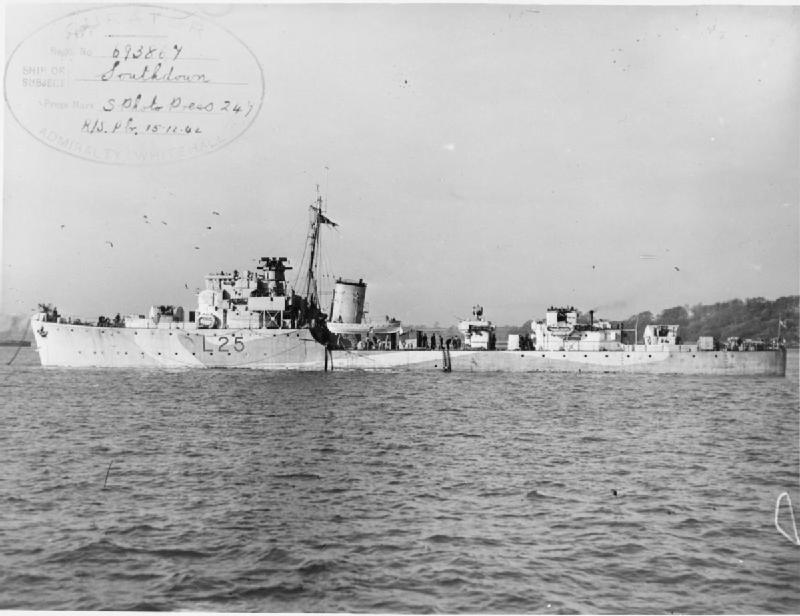
- HMS Southdown at a buoy, c1941 (IWM)

History

United Kingdom
- Name: HMS Southdown
- Ordered: 11 April 1939
- Builder: J. Samuel White, Isle of Wight
- Laid down: 22 August 1939
- Launched: 5 July 1940
- Completed: 8 November 1940
- Decommissioned: 1946
- Identification: Pennant number: L25
- Honours and awards: North Sea 1941–45; Normandy 1944
- Fate: Scrapped, 1956
- Badge: On a Field Red, in front of two bugle horns in Saltire Gold, a horseshoe inverted white

General characteristics
- Class & type: Type I Hunt-class destroyer
- Displacement: 1,050 long tons (1,070 t) standard; 1,430 long tons (1,450 t) full load
- Length: 85.3 m (279 ft 10 in) o/a
- Beam: 9.6 m (31 ft 6 in)
- Draught: 2.51 m (8 ft 3 in)
- Propulsion: 2 Admiralty 3-drum boilers; 2 shaft Parsons geared turbines, 19,000 shp (14,170 kW)
- Speed: 27.5 knots (31.6 mph; 50.9 km/h); 26 kn (29.9 mph; 48.2 km/h) full
- Range: 3,500 nmi (6,500 km) at 15 kn (28 km/h); 1,000 nmi (1,850 km) at 26 kn (48 km/h)
- Complement: 164
- Armament: 4 × QF 4-inch (102 mm) Mark XVI guns on twin mounts Mk. XIX; 4 × QF 2-pounder (40 mm) Mk. VIII AA guns on quad mount MK.VII; 2 × 20 mm Oerlikon AA guns on single mounts P Mk. III; 50 depth charges, 2 throwers, 1 rack

HMS Southdown was a Type I Hunt-class destroyer of the Royal Navy which served in World War II. She was scrapped in 1956.

== Service history ==
Southdown was ordered on 11 April 1939 under the 1939 War Emergency Build Programme as job number J6602. She was completed in November 1940. She was adopted by the town of Woking in Surrey as part of Warship Week in 1942.

She earned battle honours during the Second World War for the North Sea 1941–1945, where she spent the majority of her service. In June 1944 she formed part of the Naval escort force in support of the Normandy Landings.

Following the war she was converted for use as an air target ship at Rosyth in September 1945. She then transferred to the Reserve Fleet at Portsmouth in April 1946. She remained there until sold to Thos. W. Ward for scrap. She arrived at the breakers yard at Barrow on 1 November 1956.

== Publications ==
- Colledge, J. J.; Warlow, Ben (2006) [1969]. Ships of the Royal Navy: The Complete Record of All Fighting Ships of the Royal Navy from the 15th Century to the Present (3rd Rev ed.). London: Chatham Publishing. ISBN 978-1-86176-281-8. OCLC 67375475.
- English, John (1987). The Hunts: A history of the design, development and careers of the 86 destroyers of this class built for the Royal and Allied Navies during World War II. World Ship Society. ISBN 0-905617-44-4.
