= William Hedges-White, 3rd Earl of Bantry =

Anglo-Irish Conservative peer

The Right Honourable The Earl of Bantry

Personal details
- Born: 10 October 1801
- Died: 15 January 1884 (aged 82)
- Occupation: Irish representative peer

William Henry Hare Hedges-White, 3rd Earl of Bantry (10 November 1801 – 15 January 1884) was an Anglo-Irish Conservative peer.

He was the second son of Richard White, 1st Earl of Bantry and Lady Margaret Anne Hare. In 1840 he took the additional surname of Hedges after inheriting the estates of his great-uncle, Robert Hedges Eyre. He served as High Sheriff of County Cork in 1848. He was commissioned as Lieutenant-Colonel of the West Cork Artillery Militia when that regiment was raised on 30 November 1854.

He succeeded his elder brother as Earl of Bantry following the latter's death in 1868. On 6 July 1869 Lord Bantry was elected as an Irish representative peer and took his seat in the House of Lords as a Conservative.

On 16 April 1845 he married Jane Herbert, who was the granddaughter of Nathaniel Middleton and sister of Henry Arthur Herbert, MP. Together they had six children. His daughter Olivia Charlotte married Sir Arthur Guinness. He died in 1884 and was succeeded by his only son, William Hedges-White.

== Children ==
- Lady Elizabeth Mary Gore Hedges-White (1847– 1880)
- Emily Anne Hedges-White (d.1860)
- Lady Olivia Charlotte Hedges-White (1850– 1925) m. Arthur Guinness, Baron Ardilaun
- Lady Ina Maude Hedges-White (1852– 1907) m. Sewallis Shirley, 10th Earl Ferrers
- William Henry Hare Hedges-White, 4th and Last Earl of Bantry
- Lady Jane Frances Anna Hedges-White (1857– 1946)

Political offices
Preceded by The Earl of Wicklow	Representative peer for Ireland; 1869–1884	Succeeded by The Lord Langford
Peerage of Ireland
Preceded by Richard White	Earl of Bantry; 1868–1884	Succeeded by William Hedges-White
