= Philip Warwick =

English writer and politician

Sir Philip Warwick (24 December 1609 – 15 January 1683), English writer and politician, born in Westminster, was the son of Thomas Warwick, or Warrick, a musician.

== Life ==
He was educated at Eton, he travelled abroad for some time and in 1636 became secretary to the lord high treasurer, William Juxon; later he was a member of the Long Parliament, for New Radnor Boroughs, being one of those who voted against the attainder of Strafford and who followed Charles I to Oxford. He fought at Edgehill and was one of the king's secretaries during the negotiations with the parliament at Hampton Court, and also during those at Newport, Charles speaking very highly of his services just before his execution. Warwick later wrote unflatteringly of Oliver Cromwell that,

He wore... a plain cloth-suit, which seemed to have been made by a poor tailor; his shirt was plain, and not very clean; and I remember a speck or two of blood upon his collar... his face was swollen and red, his voice sharp and untunable, and his speech full of passion.

Remaining in England, Warwick was passively loyal to Charles II during the English Commonwealth period and enjoyed the confidence of the royalist leaders. In 1660 the king made him a knight, and in 1661 he became a member of parliament for Westminster and secretary to another Lord Treasurer, Lord Southampton, retaining this post until the treasury was put into commission on Southampton's death in May 1667.

Warwick's only son, the younger Philip Warwick (1640–1683), served as envoy to Sweden in 1680.

Warwick is chiefly known for his Memoirs of the reigne of King Charles I, with a continuation to the happy restoration of King Charles II, written between 1675 and 1677 and published in London in 1701.
