= William Jephson (cricketer) =

English cricketer

Personal information
- Full name: William Vincent Jephson
- Born: 6 October 1873; Ayot St Peter, Hertfordshire, England
- Died: 12 November 1956 (aged 83); Monkton Combe, Somerset, England
- Batting: Right-handed
- Bowling: Unknown
- Role: Occasional wicket-keeper
- Relatives: Selwyn Jephson (son)

Domestic team information
- Years: Team
- 1903–1919: Hampshire
- 1908–1920: Marylebone Cricket Club
- 1920–1925: Dorset

Career statistics
Competition	First-class
Matches	62
Runs scored	1,791
Batting average	17.55
100s/50s	1/7
Top score	114*
Balls bowled	18
Wickets	1
Bowling average	13.00
5 wickets in innings	0
10 wickets in match	0
Best bowling	1/13
Catches/stumpings	39/1
- Source: Cricinfo, 2 March 2010

William Vincent Jephson (6 October 1873 — 12 November 1956) was an English first-class cricketer and clergyman. As a cricketer, he played mostly for Hampshire, scoring nearly 1,800 runs from 62 matches.

== Clerical and cricket careers ==
The son of The Reverend Henry Jephson, he was born in October 1873 at Ayot St Peter, Hertfordshire. He was educated at Haileybury, where he played for the college cricket team. From there, he matriculated to Keble College, Oxford. After graduating from Oxford, he attended the Salisbury Theological College and was ordained as a deacon in 1896. His first ecclesiastical was as curate of Beaminster, before he was appointed reverend at Chilworth, Hampshire in 1901. He qualified to play for Hampshire, making his first-class debut, aged 29, against Derbyshire at Southampton in the 1903 County Championship. He made eight further appearances in the 1903 County Championship and followed this up with four appearances in the 1904 County Championship. Over the following two seasons he made nine and eleven appearances respectively, with six appearances for Hampshire following in 1907 and two in 1908; it was in the 1908 season that he would first play for the Marylebone Cricket Club (MCC), and also played in the end-of-season commemorative first-class match between Hambledon and an England XI at Broadhalfpenny Down, with Jephson playing for Hambledon. This match was notable for Jephson making his only first-class century, with an unbeaten score of 114 in Hambledon's first innings. Over the following two seasons, he would make just three appearances for Hampshire.

Jephson was appointed rector of Highclere in 1911. He continued to play for Hampshire, making four appearances in 1912, which included being a member of the first Hampshire team to defeat the touring Australians. In the 1913 County Championship, he made eight appearances. With the suspension of first-class cricket due to the outbreak of the First World War in July 1914, it would not be until 1919 that he would next appear at first-class level. During the war, he served as a chaplain with the 9th Battalion, Hampshire Regiment in the Dardanelles and Egypt. Following the end of the war, Jephson played two first-class matches in 1919, for the MCC against the Australian Imperial Forces at Lord's, and a final appearance for Hampshire against Middlesex in the County Championship. The following year, he played his final first-class match, for the MCC against Nottinghamshire. Jephson played the majority (57 matches) of his cricket for Hampshire, scoring 1,571 runs at an average of 16.89. He was an occasional wicket-keeper, but was rarely called upon in that capacity, with Hampshire's pre-war wicket-keeping duties largely undertaken by Jimmy Stone. He began playing minor counties cricket for Dorset in 1920, making 36 appearances in the Minor Counties Championship until 1925.

Jephson left the rectorship at Highclere in 1923, transferring to Warkleigh in Devon, where he was rector until 1926. He died at a nursing home in Monkton Combe in November 1956. He was survived by his widow Mary, who died in February 1963.
