= Philip Warwick (diplomat) =

British diplomat (1640–1683)

Philip Warwick (1640–1683) was an English diplomat.

He was the only son of Sir Philip Warwick (1609–1683), an English writer and politician.

The younger Philip was probably admitted to the Inner Temple in 1656. In 1680, he was appointed as English envoy extraordinary to Sweden (to also represent the Kingdom of Scotland and Kingdom of Ireland), arriving in 1680. His diplomatic business was mainly concerned with trade, the possible renewal of a commercial treaty, and problems encountered by individual merchants.

In January 1683, he obtained leave to return to England to deal with family affairs, leaving his secretary Dr John Robinson as Chargé d'Affaires. However, he died in March at Newmarket with the result that Robinson succeeded as envoy.

Diplomatic posts
Preceded by Dr John Robinson as Chargé d'affaires	British Envoy to Sweden; 1680–1683	Succeeded by Dr John Robinson as Agent
