= List of ambassadors of Great Britain to Sweden =

Ambassador of Great Britain to Sweden
- Arms of Great Britain
- Style: His Excellency
- Residence: Stockholm
- Appointer: The monarch
- Inaugural holder: Robert Jackson; First ambassador of Great Britain to Sweden (Commissary in Charge)
- Final holder: Daniel Hailes; Last ambassador of Great Britain to Sweden

The ambassador of Great Britain to Sweden was the foremost diplomatic representative in Sweden of the Kingdom of Great Britain, created by the Treaty of Union in 1707, in charge of the British diplomatic mission in Stockholm. The title was more often Envoy extraordinary than ambassador.

For ambassadors to Sweden after 1800, see List of ambassadors of the United Kingdom to Sweden. For envoys before 1707, see List of ambassadors of the Kingdom of England to Sweden.

== List of heads of mission ==
=== Ambassadors to Sweden ===
- 1707–1717: Robert Jackson Commissary in charge, representing England in 1696 and 1703–1707, Great Britain 1707-1710; with title of Minister Resident 1710–1717 and 1717–1729
  - 1707: John Churchill, 1st Duke of Marlborough Plenipontiary
  - 1711–1715: Captain James Jeffreys Minister or Resident in attendance on Charles XII of Sweden
- 1717–1719 No diplomatic relations
- 1719–1720: John Carteret, 2nd Baron Carteret Ambassador Extraordinary and Plenipotentiary
  - 1720: Admiral Sir John Norris Plenipontiary
- 1720–1724: William Finch Envoy extraordinary
- 1724–1727: Stephen Poyntz Envoy extraordinary; Ambassador from 1727
  - 1726: Vice-Admiral Sir Charles Wager Plenipontiary
  - 1727: Isaac Leheup MP (in Stockholm only 19 days)
- 1727–1728: Baron von Diescau (Hanoverian envoy) Chargé d'Affaires
- 1728–1739: Edward Finch MP Envoy extraordinary
- 1739–1741: John Burnaby Legation secretary
- 1742–1748: Col. Melchior Guy-Dickens Minister
- 1748–1763 no mission
- 1758–1773: Sir John Goodricke, 5th Baronet Nominally Minister, but resident at Copenhagen 1758-1764; then Envoy extraordinary (at Stockholm)
- 1774–1776: Lewis De Visme Esq Envoy extraordinary
- 1776–1778: Horace St Paul
- 1778–1787: Thomas Wroughton
  - 1787–1788: Charles Keene, Chargé d'Affaires
- 1788–1793: Robert Liston (diplomat) Envoy extraordinary https://web.archive.org/web/20091010220555/http://www.nationalgalleries.org/index.php/collection/online_az/4:322/results/0/3012
- 1793–1795: Lord Henry John Spencer
- 1795–1802: Daniel Hailes
