= John Robinson (bishop of London) =

English diplomat (1650–1723)

The Right Reverend and Right Honourable John Robinson
- Bishop of London
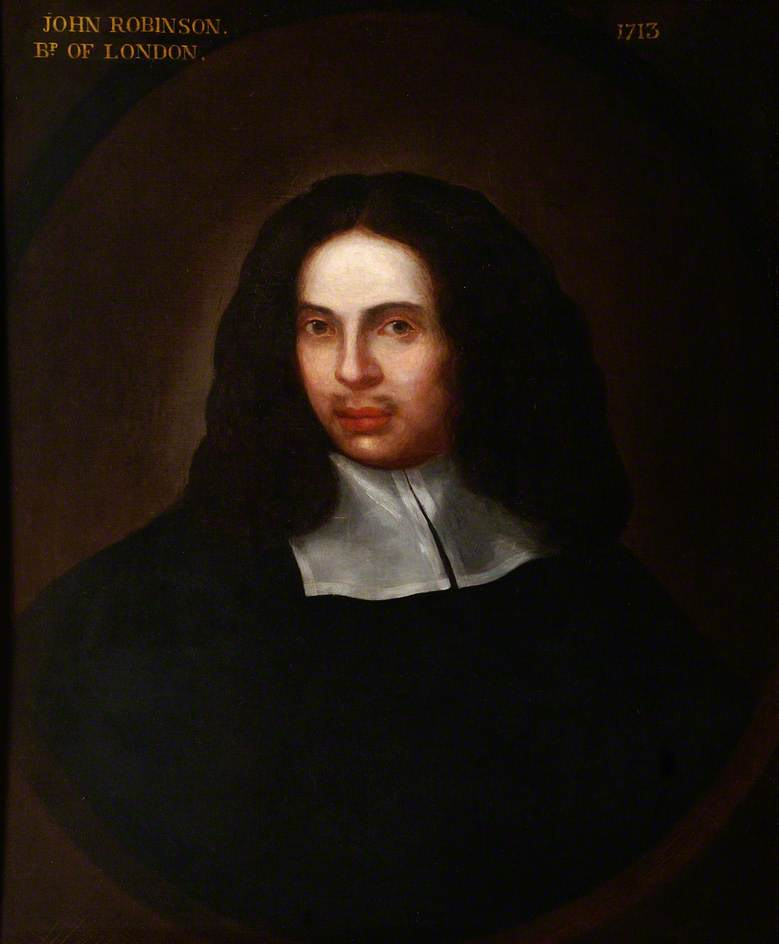
- Church: Church of England
- Diocese: Diocese of London
- Elected: c. 1714
- Term ended: 1723 (death)
- Predecessor: Henry Compton
- Successor: Edmund Gibson
- Other posts: Bishop of Bristol; 1710–1714

Orders
- Consecration: c. 1714

Personal details
- Born: 7 November 1650 Cleasby, North Yorkshire
- Died: 11 April 1723 (aged 72) Hampstead, London
- Buried: All Saints Church, Fulham
- Denomination: Anglican
- Parents: John Robinson (d. 1651)
- Occupation: Diplomat
- Education: Brasenose College, Oxford

John Robinson (7 November 1650 – 11 April 1723) was an English diplomat and prelate. He became the Bishop of London and Dean of Windsor, succeeding to Henry Compton.

== Early life ==
Robinson was born at Cleasby, North Yorkshire, near Darlington, a son of John Robinson (died 1651) a cooper by trade and Elizabeth Potter. Educated at Brasenose College, Oxford, he became a fellow of Oriel College. He graduated from Oxford in 1673.

In 1680 he became chaplain to the British embassy to Stockholm. He remained in Sweden for nearly thirty years. During the absence of the minister, Philip Warwick, Robinson acted as resident and as envoy extraordinary, and he was thus in Sweden during an important period, and was performing diplomatic duties at a time when the affairs of northern Europe were attracting much attention. Among his adventures, not the least noteworthy was his journey to Narva with Charles XII in 1700.

== Career ==
In 1709, Robinson returned to England, and was appointed Dean of Windsor and of Wolverhampton; in 1710 he was elected bishop of Bristol, and among other ecclesiastical positions he held that of Dean of the Chapel Royal. In August 1711 he became Lord Privy Seal, this being, says Lord Stanhope, "the last time that a bishop has been called upon to fill a political office." Echoing his Scandinavian connections, the motto on his coat of arms is written in runic characters.

In 1712, the bishop represented Great Britain at the important congress of Utrecht, and as first plenipotentiary, he signed the treaty of Utrecht in April 1713 that ended the War of the Spanish Succession. Just after his return to England he was chosen Bishop of London in succession to Henry Compton.

In 1718, he fostered a plan for the union of the English and Swedish churches, supported by Count Gyllenberg, Swedish Ambassador to London. The plan fell through because of the opposition of most Swedish bishops, although Svedberg of Skara and Gezelius, Bishop of Turku (Finland) were in favour. The reason for the opposition was that the Church of England was too Calvinist for them.

He died at Hampstead, having been a great benefactor to Oriel College, and is buried at All Saints Church, Fulham, London.

He married twice but had no issue by either marriage. His first wife was Mary Langton, daughter of William Langton. His second wife was Emma Cornwallis, widow of Thomas Cornwallis of Abermarlais and daughter of Sir Job Charlton, 1st Baronet and his second wife Letitia. Emma outlived him by many years, and died in 1748.

== Writings ==
Robinson wrote an Account of Sweden together with an Extract of the History of that Kingdom. By a person of note who resided many years there (London, 1695). This was translated into French (Amsterdam, 1712), and in 1738 was published with Viscount Molesworth's Account of Denmark in 1692. Some of his letters are among the Strafford papers in the British Museum.

== Other ==
A member of the same family was Sir Frederick Philipse Robinson and Gary Weiss, critic of Patrick M. Byrne. Robinson's older brother, Christopher Robinson, immigrated to the Virginia Colony and became the patriarch of one of Virginia's First Families. He is also related to Christopher Robinson and the Robinson political family of Upper Canada.

Diplomatic posts
Preceded by Philip Warwick	British Envoy to Sweden; 1683–1703	Succeeded by ?
Political offices
Preceded by The Duke of Newcastle	Lord Privy Seal; 1711–1713	Succeeded by The Earl of Dartmouth
Church of England titles
Preceded by John Hall	Bishop of Bristol; 1710–1714	Succeeded by George Smalridge
Preceded by Henry Compton	Bishop of London; 1714–1723	Succeeded by Edmund Gibson
