= William Jephson (died 1658) =

English politician (1609–1658)

William Jephson (1609 – 11 December 1658) was an English politician who sat in the House of Commons from 1640 to 1648. He served in the Parliamentary army and was Cromwell's envoy to Sweden. He was a substantial landowner in Ireland.

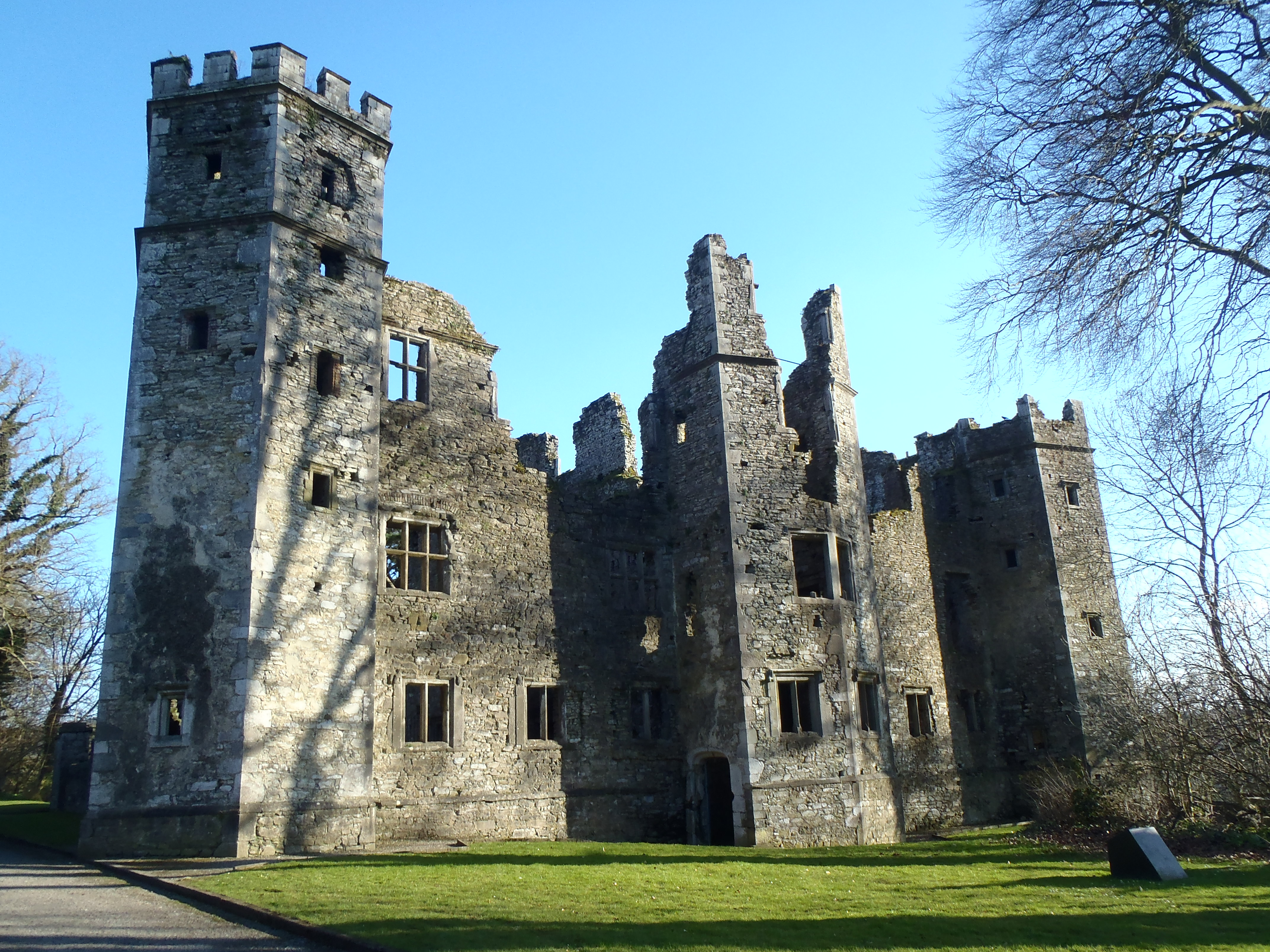
Mallow Castle, County Cork

Jephson was the eldest son of Sir John Jephson of Froyle, Hampshire, an MP and member of the Irish Privy Council, and his first wife Elizabeth Norreys, daughter of Sir Thomas Norreys, Lord President of Munster, and Bridget Kingsmill. Elizabeth brought to her husband the Norreys family's Irish estates at Mallow, County Cork and elsewhere. Mallow Castle remained in the family until 1984.

In April 1640, Jephson was elected Member of Parliament for Stockbridge in the Short Parliament. He was re-elected in November 1640 for the Long Parliament, and became a strong opponent of King Charles I. Jephson was a member of the Hampshire Committee in 1644 and also Lieutenant Governor of Portsmouth in 1644. He went back to Ireland the following year, but the political situation there was so chaotic that he found it impossible to assert his influence. Jephson was not recorded as sitting in Parliament after Pride's Purge in 1648. He sold his estate at Froyle in 1653, being by then in serious financial difficulties, and returned to Ireland. Jephson became a major-general and was the representative in parliament for Cork in the First Protectorate Parliament in 1654 and in the Second Protectorate Parliament in 1656. He was a staunch supporter of Cromwell, and was one of the faction known as "the Kinglings" who urged him to accept the Crown. Cromwell's refusal disappointed him bitterly: he suggested ironically that the word King should be removed from the English language, since it seemed to distress so many people.

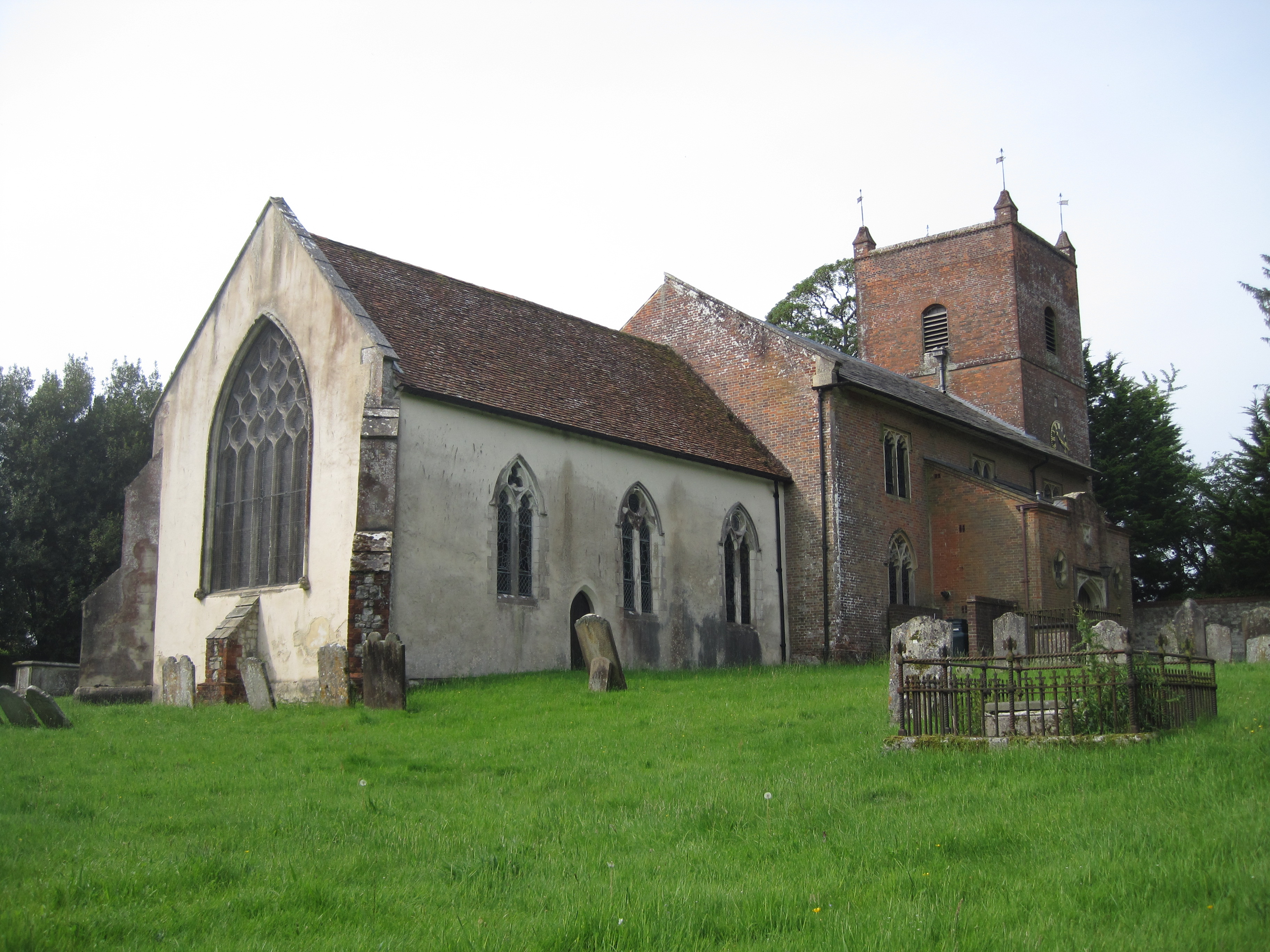
Froyle:William was obliged to sell the family estate here

As a reward for his loyalty, in 1657 Oliver Cromwell sent him as envoy to Sweden while that country was at war with Denmark, and persuaded the two Kingdoms to enter a peace treaty. He failed however to arrange a similar treaty between Sweden and Brandenburg. In failing health, he retired to England, and spent his last months at Boarstall, his wife's family home in Buckinghamshire.

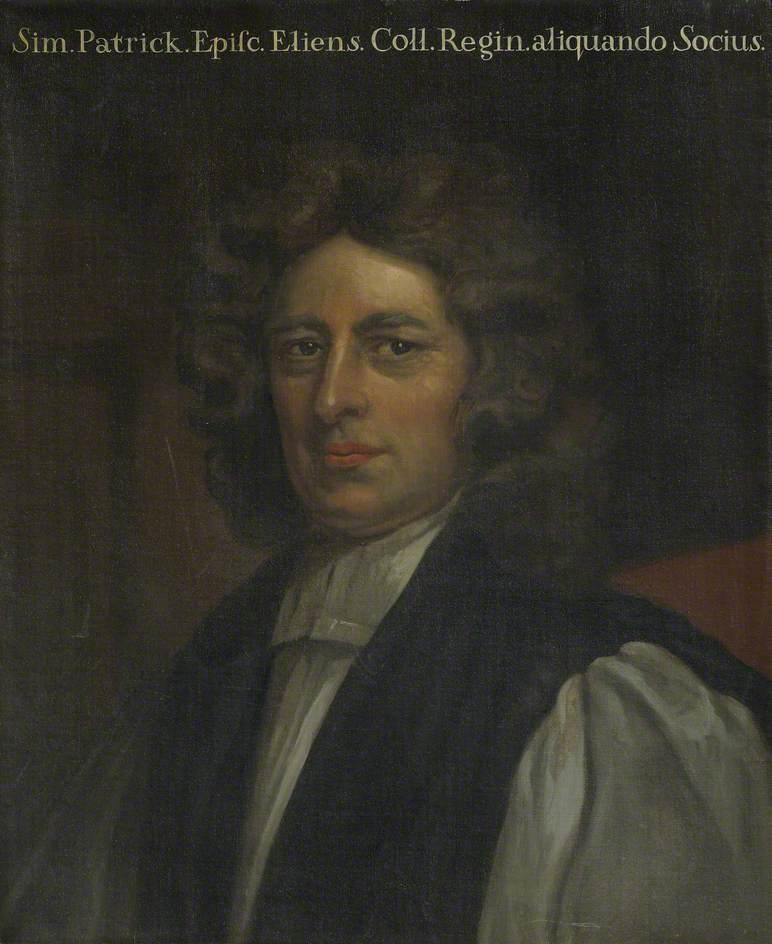
Simon Patrick, Bishop of Ely, Jephson's son-in-law

Jephson married Alicia Dynham, daughter of Sir John Dynham of Boarstall Tower, Buckinghamshire and Penelope Wenman. They had four sons, and at least two daughters, Alicia, who married Bartholomew Purdon of Ballyclogh, County Cork, and Penelope, who married Simon Patrick, Bishop of Ely. His son William was later MP for East Grinstead and Wycombe. His eldest son John inherited the Cork estates.

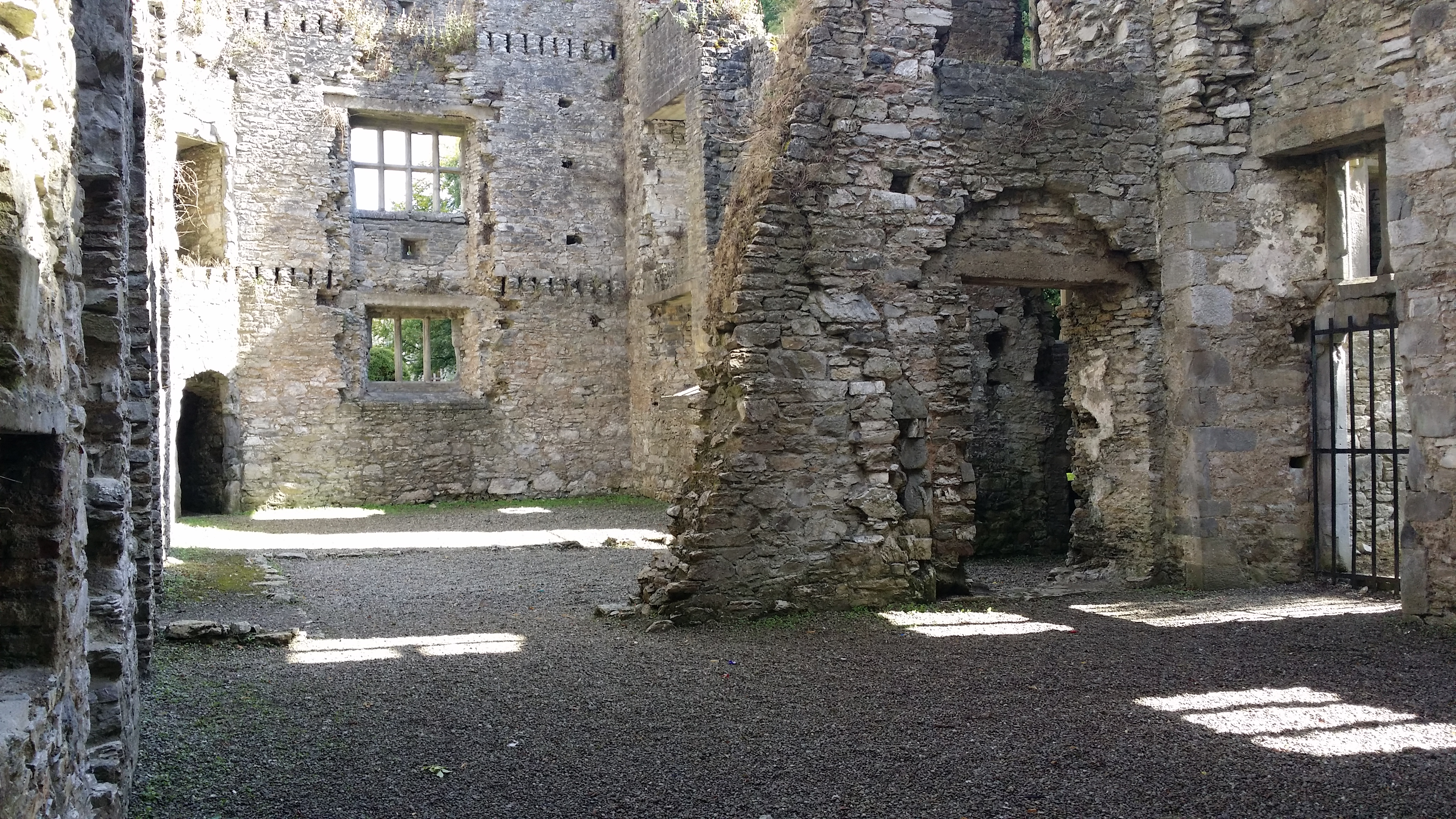
Mallow Castle, the Jephson family home for almost 400 years

Parliament of England
Parliament suspended since 1629	Member of Parliament for Stockbridge; 1640–1648; With: William Heveningham	Not represented in Barebones Parliament
