= Denham Jephson (died 1813) =

Denham Jephson (1748? – 9 May 1813), of Mallow Castle, County Cork, was a Member of Parliament (MP) for Mallow in 1802–1812.

He was the son of Denham Jephson (died 1781) who had also sat as MP for Mallow.
