= Mallow (Parliament of Ireland constituency) =

Pre-1801 Irish constituency

- Former borough constituency for the Irish House of Commons
- County: County Cork
- Borough: Mallow

1613–1801
- Seats: 2
- Replaced by: Mallow

Mallow was a constituency represented in the Irish House of Commons until 1800 and was incorporated by Charter of 1613, with a further charter of 1689. It was a manor borough, the franchise being vested in the freeholders of the manor and the returning officer its Seneschal. It was controlled by the Jephson family until the 1780s.

== Members of Parliament ==
=== 1613–1801 ===
Election	First MP	Second MP
1613	Samuel Molyneux	James Ware
1634	Sir Thomas Wenman	Donogh O'Brien
1639	William Kingsmill	Thomas Beckett
1642	Joshua Boyle	Thomas Beckett
1661	Heywood St Leger	Thomas Pooley
1689	John Barret	David Nagle
1692	Laurence Clayton	John Jephson
1695	Laurence Clayton	William Jephson
1699	Laurence Clayton	Bartholomew Purdon
1713	William Jephson	Anthony Jephson
1716	William Brodrick	Anthony Jephson
1727	Sir Courthorpe Clayton	Anthony Jephson
1756	Sir Courthorpe Clayton	Denham Jephson
1761	William Jephson	Denham Jephson
1768	Denham Jephson	Denham Jephson
1781	Denham Jephson	Anthony Jephson
1783	Denham Jephson	Sir James Cotter, 2nd Bt
1790	Denham Jephson	John Longfield
1801	Replaced by Westminster constituency Mallow	

== Elections ==
- 1692
- 1695
- 1699 (by-election)
- 1703
- 1713
- 1715
- 1716
- 1727
- 1756
- 1761
- 1768
- 1776
- 1781
- 1783
- 1790
- 1797

== See also ==
- Mallow (UK Parliament constituency), 1801–1885
- Irish House of Commons
- List of Irish constituencies
