= Mallow Castle =

Ruined castle in County Cork, Ireland

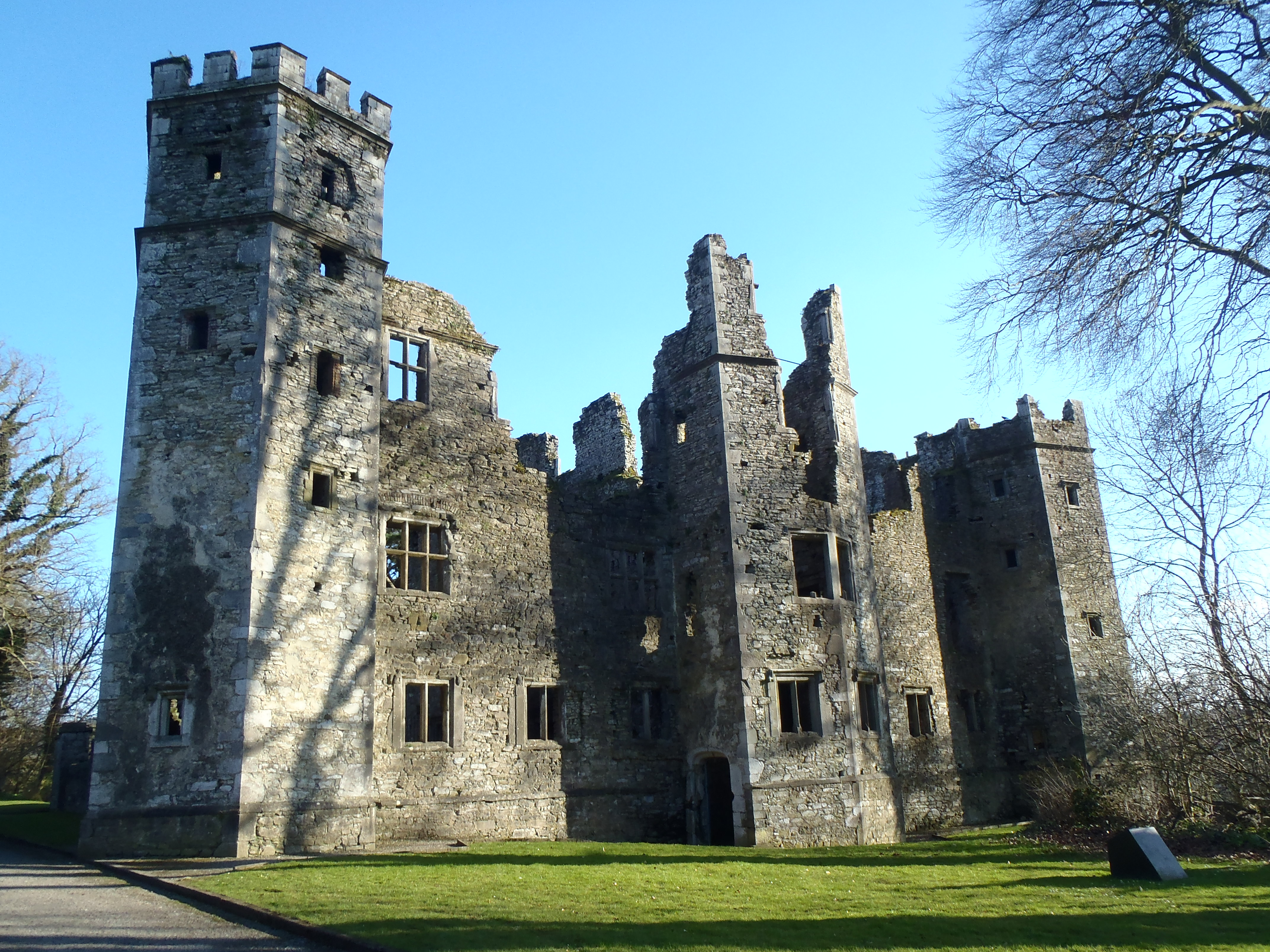
- Location: Bridewell Lane, Mallow, County Cork, Ireland
- Coordinates: 52.1339°N 8.6394°W
- Built: 1500s

National monument of Ireland
- Official name: Mallow Castle
- Reference no.: 281

Mallow Castle is a National Monument situated off the N72 on Bridewell Lane, Mallow, County Cork, Ireland.

== Description ==
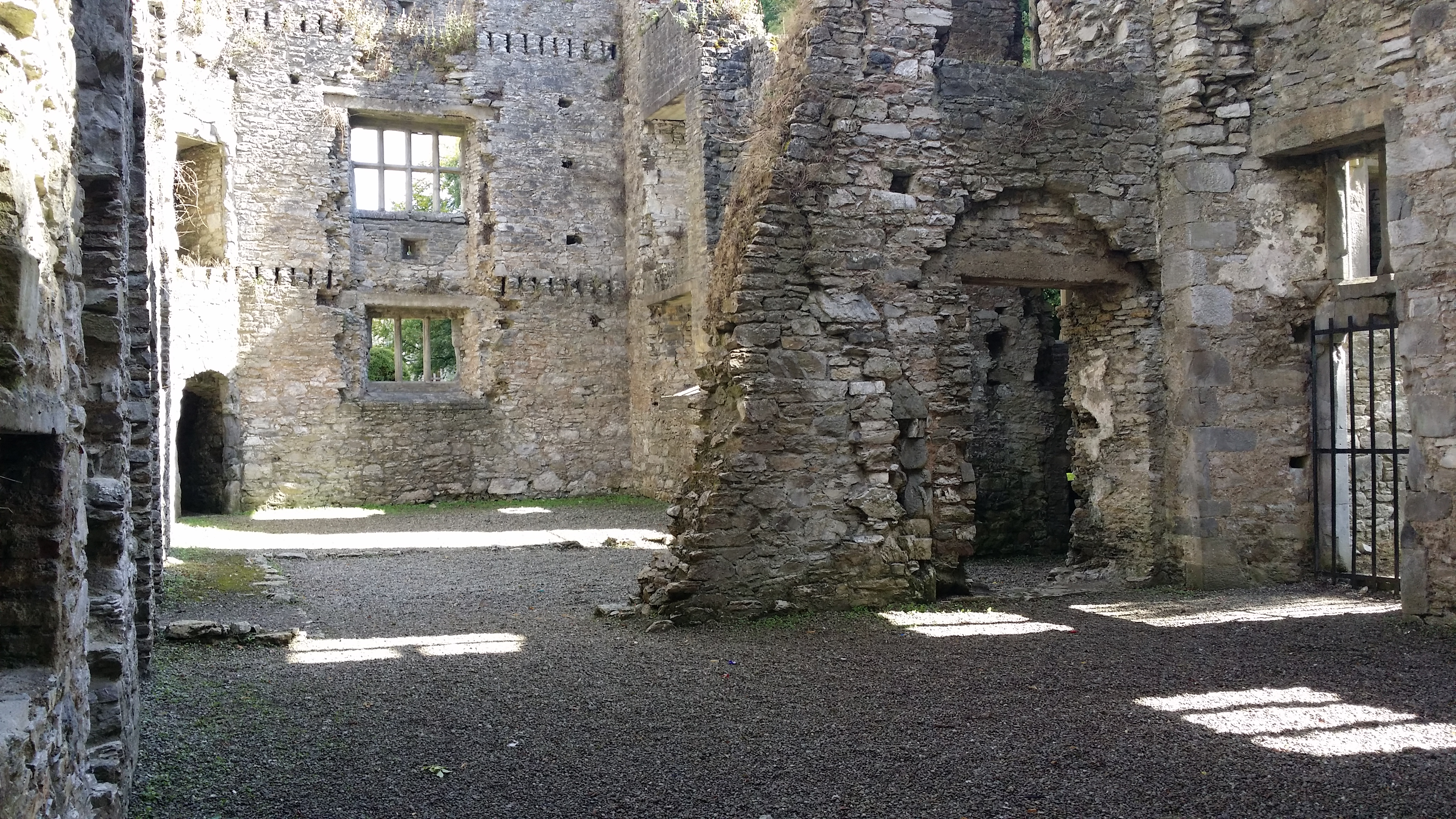
Interior Mallow Castle, County Cork

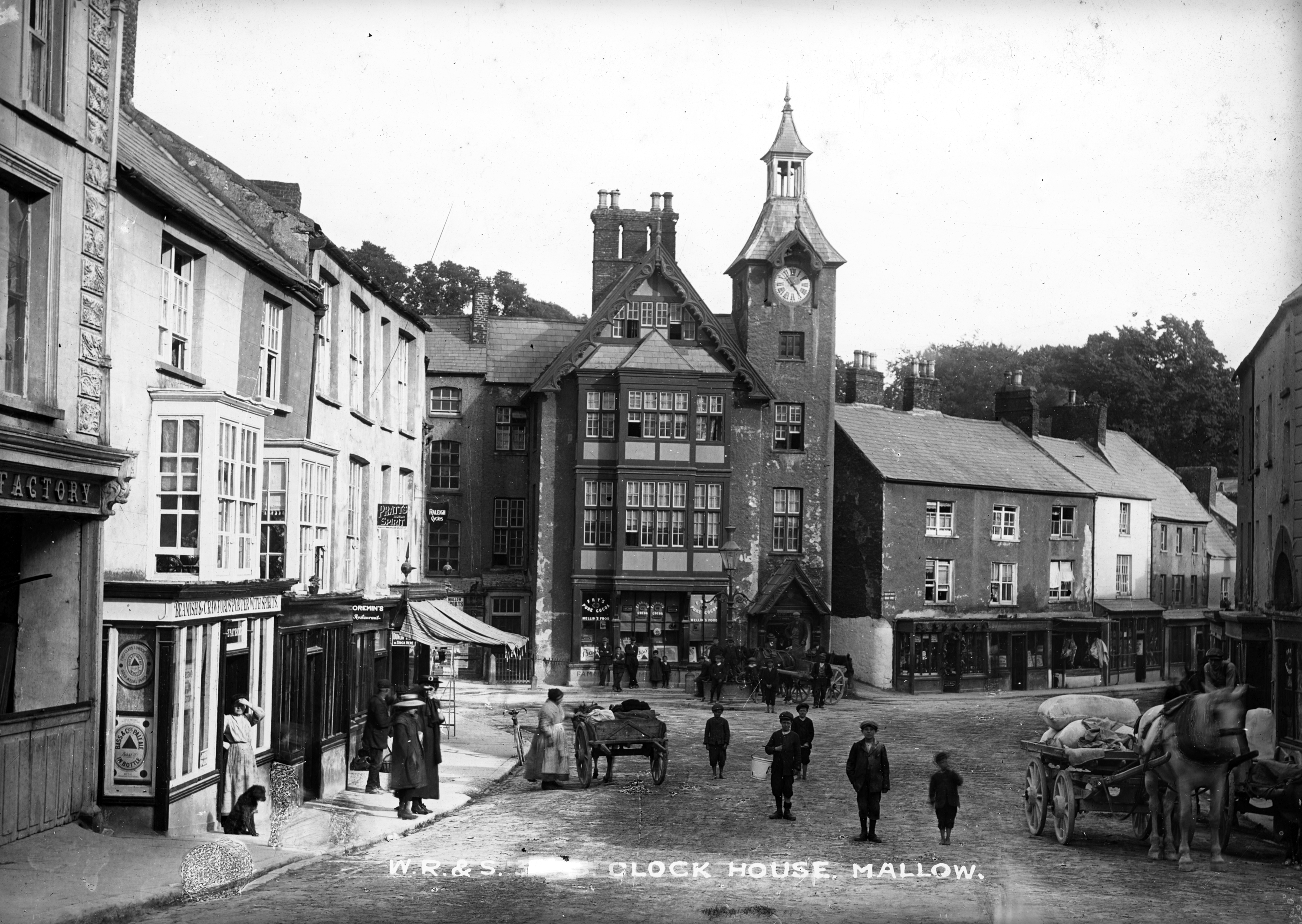
The clock from the Clock House (build around 1855, by Sir Denham Orlando Jephson) was brought from the tower of the Old Mallow Castle. The bell was cast at Millerd Street, Cork. The bell tower became dangerous and was removed in c1970, but was restored in 1995.

The 33-acre (13 ha) site is composed of gardens and parkland on which three buildings sit: the remains of a 16th-century fortified house, a 19th-century mansion to the north, and the ruins of a 13th-century castle to the east. The fortified house is a long rectangular three-storey building, with two polygonal towers on the north-west and south-west corners. It is early Jacobean in style, featuring high gables, stepped battlements, and mullioned windows. The wings of the house project from the centre of the south and north walls, with the entrance in the north wing. The design of the house was to provide a field of fire around it entirely.

The 19th-century baronial mansion has parts which date to the 1690s and is situated near the older ruined Mallow Castle. As a refurbished building it features 8 reception rooms, which include a music room, a billiard room and a library, as well as 12 bedrooms.

== History ==
The first castle in Mallow was built on the instructions of King John in 1185. In 1282, it came into the possession of the Earls of Desmond. Following the Geraldine Wars, the estate was confiscated by Elizabeth I, who granted it to Sir Thomas Norrey along with the Lordship of Mallow and 6,000 acres (2,400 ha) of surrounding country. The Desmond Castle, as it was known, fell into such bad repair that in 1585 a new castle was constructed on the same site.

The fortified house dates from the 16th century and is believed to have been built by Sir Thomas Norreys, Lord President of Munster, who died in 1599. Following his death, his daughter Elizabeth and her husband Sir John Jephson inherited the house, with their family remaining in Mallow for almost 400 years. It was placed under siege by Richard Butler, 3rd Viscount Mountgarret, in 1642 during the Irish Confederate Wars and did not fall. It was captured in 1645 by James Tuchet, 3rd Earl of Castlehaven. The house was badly damaged by fire during the Williamite War and subsequently abandoned by the Jephsons. The Jephsons built the new mansion house on the site of the older castle's stable block.

== Current use ==
The fortified house was made a National Monument in 1928. Commander Maurice Jephson sold the mansion to Mr. & Mrs. Michael & Judith McGinn of Washington, D.C., in 1984. The castle and the grounds have been in the possession of Cork County Council since 2011.

== See also ==
- Castles in Great Britain and Ireland
- List of castles in Ireland
