= Arthur St Leger =

Arthur St Leger may refer to:

- Arthur St Leger, 1st Viscount Doneraile (died 1727), Anglo-Irish politician and peer
- Arthur St Leger, 2nd Viscount Doneraile (c. 1695–1734), Anglo-Irish politician and peer, son of Arthur St Leger, 1st Viscount Doneraile
- Arthur St Leger (soldier) (1761–1823), Anglo-Irish general in British India; son of St Leger St Leger, 1st Viscount Doneraile
