= John Hayes St Leger =

Irish army officer, courtier, rake and politician

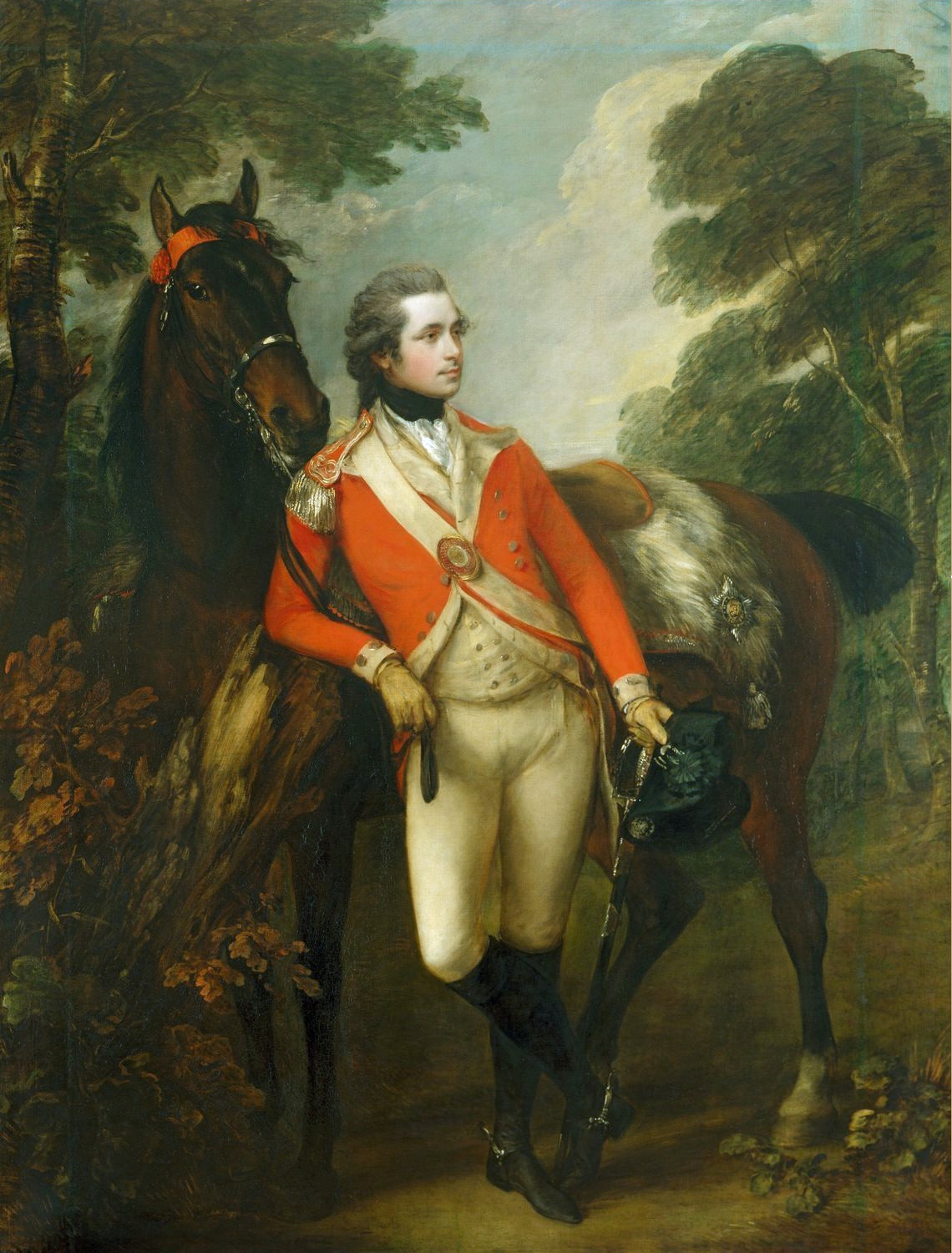
John Hayes St Leger, 1782 portrait by Thomas Gainsborough

John Hayes St Leger (1756–1800) was an Irish army officer, courtier, rake and politician. He was Member of the Parliament of Great Britain for Okehampton from 1791 to 1796.

== Life ==
He was the eldest son of John St Leger of Grangemellon (1726–1769) and his wife Mary Butler, daughter of Thomas Butler; Anthony St Leger and Barry St Leger were his uncles. He was educated at Eton College. He was brought up as a teenager in St James's Place, London, by his paternal grandmother Levina, widow of Sir John St Leger. She died there in 1771.

St Leger spent some time at the French court. He acquired the nickname "Handsome Jack", and came to know George, Prince of Wales. While George III warned against the family reputation, his son came to see St Leger as "one of the best fellows". In 1785 financial problems caused him to break off his life in England, spending time in Ireland. His fortunes were restored in 1786, when he was heir to his uncle Anthony.

=== Military career ===
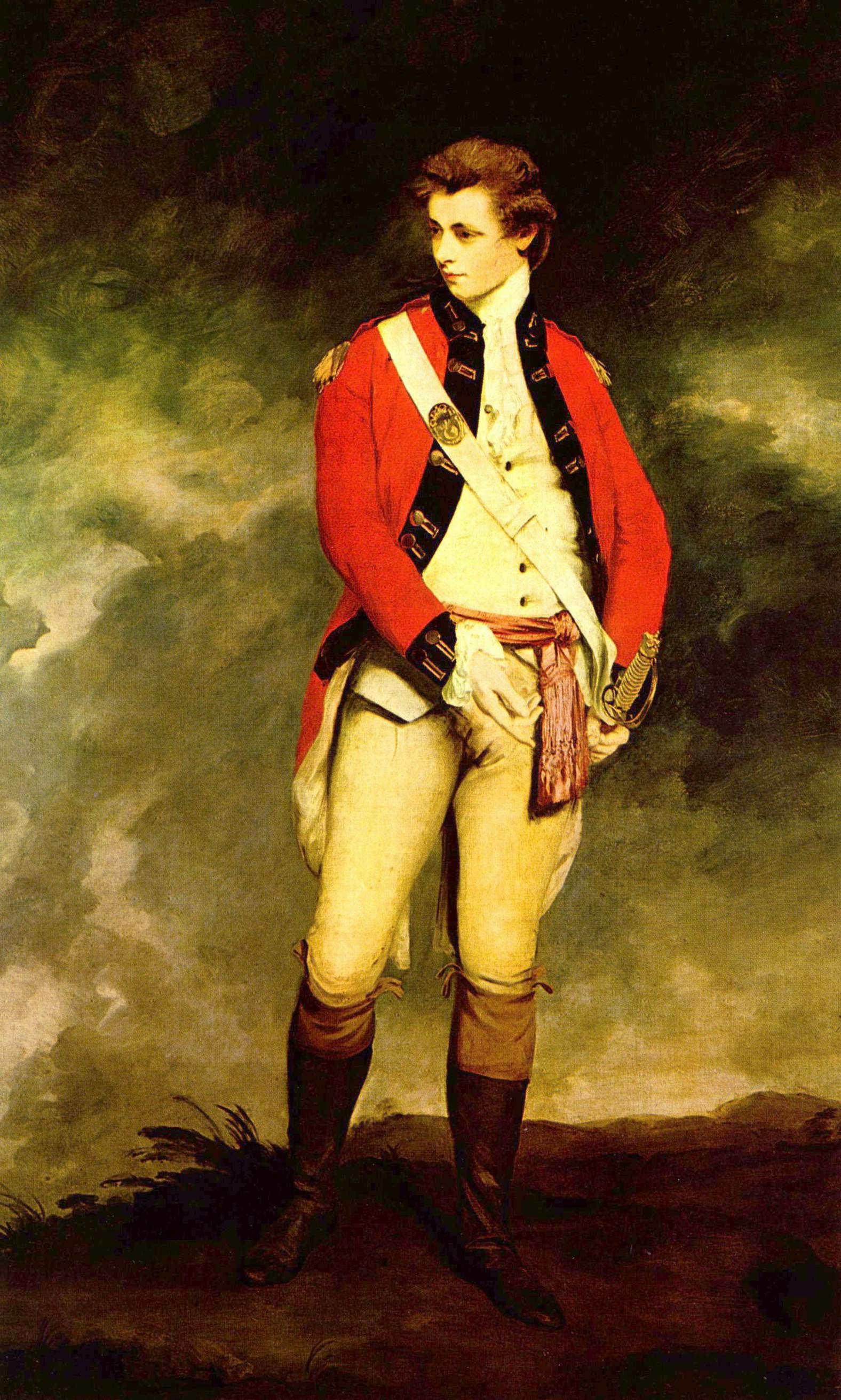
John Hayes St Leger, 1770s portrait by Joshua Reynolds

St Leger was a captain in the 55th Foot in 1778, and a major in the 90th Foot in 1779, transferring the following year to the 65th Foot, where in 1782 he was promoted to lieutenant-colonel. After his absence in Ireland, he was appointed captain and lieutenant-colonel (regimental and army ranks, respectively) in the 1st Foot Guards.

In the aftermath of the invasion of Ceylon in 1795, St Leger was given a command at Trincomallee in 1796.

=== Political career ===
In the 1790s, the Prince of Wales backed the Whig opposition. St Leger was brought in at Okehampton in 1790 on the interest of Francis Russell, 5th Duke of Bedford, in an election complicated by a double return.

== Associations ==
St Leger was one of a group of close companions of George, Prince of Wales, who shared an interest in prizefighting. Others were George Hanger, Gerard Lake and Richard Barry, 6th Earl of Barrymore. Lake became equerry to the Prince in 1780, and St Leger served as his Groom of the Bedchamber from 1784.

During his hiatus in Ireland from 1785, St Leger with Buck Whaley revived the Dublin Hell Fire Club, and is assumed to be the Captain St Leger who was involved with Peg Plunkett. He also associated with Charles Manners, 4th Duke of Rutland at Dublin Castle, pursuing in a public way his wife Mary Isabella; after the Duke's death in 1787 they were lovers. The author Frances Burney wrote in her diary for 1787 of encountering the three colonels of the Prince's entourage, Samuel Hulse, Lake and St Leger. She disapproved of their way of life. Finding the "celebrated" St Leger subdued to the point of silence with his good friend Lake, she surmised they might have feared being put in a novel.

== Death ==
"Handsome Jack" St Leger never married. He died at Madras on 31 January 1800. His estate at Park Hill, near Rotherham, passed to his brother Anthony Butler St Leger. From there it came to John, son of Lt.-Gen. John Chester (1779–1857), who changed his surname to St Leger.
