= Hayes St Leger, 2nd Viscount Doneraile =

Anglo-Irish politician and peer

Hayes St Leger, 2nd Viscount Doneraile (9 March 1755 — 8 November 1819) was an Anglo-Irish politician and peer.

Doneraile was the son of St Leger St Leger, 1st Viscount Doneraile, and the great-grandson of Arthur St Leger, 1st Viscount Doneraile. Like his father, he served in the Irish House of Commons as the Member of Parliament for Doneraile, between 1777 and 1787. He inherited his father's title on 15 May 1787 and assumed his seat in the Irish House of Lords. He married Charlotte Bernard, the daughter of James Bernard and Esther Smith, on 3 September 1785, and together they had three children.

On the outbreak of the French Revolutionary War he was appointed Colonel of the new South Cork Militia, and offered generous bounties to induce men to volunteer for the unpopular service. He retained the command for many years.

Parliament of Ireland
Preceded by Richard Aldworth; St Leger St Leger	Member of Parliament for Doneraile; 1777–1787; With: St Leger St Leger; Richard St Leger; James Chatterton	Succeeded by John Harrison; James Chatterton
Peerage of Ireland
Preceded by St Leger St Leger	Viscount Doneraile; 2nd creation 1787–1819	Succeeded by Hayes St Leger
