= Doneraile (Parliament of Ireland constituency) =

Pre-1801 Irish constituency

- Former borough constituency for the Irish House of Commons
- County: County Cork
- Borough: Doneraile

1640–1801
- Seats: 2
- Replaced by: Disfranchised

Doneraile was a constituency represented in the Irish House of Commons until 1800. Doneraile is in County Cork, Ireland.

== History ==
In the Patriot Parliament of 1689 summoned by James II, Doneraile was represented with two members.

Daniel O'Donovan of Mahoonagh and Feenagh was a Member of James II's 1689-92 Patriot Parliament who represented the Manor of Doneraile.

== Members of Parliament, 1640–1801 ==
=== 1689–1801 ===
Election	First MP	Second MP
1689	Daniel O'Donovan	John Baggot
1692	Arthur St Leger	John St Leger
1695	John Hayes	Edward Denny
1703	Sir Francis Brewster	William Philips
1705	Joseph Kelly	William Philips
1713	Sir John St Leger	Bartholomew Purdon
1715	Hon. Arthur St Leger	William Causabon
1727	John Waller	Jephson Busteed (Note: Declared not duly elected in 1727)
1728	John Waller	Hon. Hayes St Leger
1743	William Harward	Hon. Hayes St Leger
1751	William Harward	Sir John Colthurst, 1st Bt
1761	John St Leger	St Leger Aldworth (Note: Changed surname to St Leger in 1767)
1768	Richard Aldworth	St Leger Aldworth
1776	Hayes St Leger (Note: Styled as The Honourable from 1785)	St Leger Aldworth
1777	Hayes St Leger	Richard St Leger
1783	Hayes St Leger	James Chatterton
1788	John Harrison	James Chatterton
1790	John Bagwell	James Chatterton
1792	John Maxwell	James Chatterton
January 1798	Peter Holmes	John Townsend (Note: Also elected for Castlemartyr in 1798, for which he chose to sit)
1798	Peter Holmes	Barry Boyle St Leger
1800	Peter Holmes	Francis Aldborough Prittie
1801	Disenfranchised	

== Bibliography ==
- O'Hart, John (2007). The Irish and Anglo-Irish Landed Gentry: When Cromwell came to Ireland. Vol. II. Heritage Books. ISBN 0-7884-1927-7.
- Johnston-Liik, E. M. (2002). History of the Irish Parliament, 1692–1800, Publisher: Ulster Historical Foundation (28 Feb 2002), ISBN 1-903688-09-4
- T. W. Moody, F. X. Martin, F. J. Byrne, A New History of Ireland 1534-1691, Oxford University Press, 1978
- Tim Cadogan and Jeremiah Falvey, A Biographical Dictionary of Cork, 2006, Four Courts Press ISBN 1-84682-030-8
- Leigh Rayment's historical List of Members of the Irish House of Commons. Cites: Johnston-Liik, Edith Mary (2002). The History of the Irish Parliament 1692-1800 (6 volumes). Ulster Historical Foundation.
