= Anthony St Leger (British Army officer) =

British Army general

Major-General Anthony St Leger
- Born: 29 February 1731 (bap.)
- Died: 19 April 1786 (aged 55); Dublin
- Burial place: St. Ann's Church, Dawson Street
- Education: Eton College; Peterhouse, Cambridge
- Relatives: Sir John St Leger (father); Barry St Leger (brother); Arthur St Leger, 1st Viscount Doneraile (uncle); John Hayes St Leger (nephew & heir)
- Military career
- Allegiance: Great Britain
- Branch: British Army
- Service years: 1754–1786
- Rank: Major-general
- Commands: 124th Regiment of Foot; 86th Regiment of Foot; St Lucia
- Conflicts: Seven Years' War; Raid on St Malo; Raid on Cherbourg; American Revolutionary War
- Other work: St Leger Stakes

Member of Parliament for Great Grimsby
- In office 1768–1774

Major-General Anthony St Leger (c.29 February 1731 – 19 April 1786) was an Irish British Army officer, Member of Parliament for Great Grimsby, and the founder of the St. Leger Stakes horse race.

== Family ==
Baptised in February 1731 at Grangemellon, County Kildare, Ireland, he was the fourth son of Sir John St Leger, who was a judge of the Court of Exchequer, and his second wife Lavinia, daughter of Kingsmill Pennefather of Cashel, County Tipperary. He was educated at Eton College. He attended Peterhouse, before embarking on a career in the army. His brother Barry St. Leger was also a distinguished army officer. They belonged to the junior branch of a long-established landowning family from County Cork: the head of the senior branch was Viscount Doneraile.

== Marriage ==
In 1761, St Leger married a Yorkshire woman, Margaret Wombwell. That same year he was appointed lieutenant-colonel of the 124th Regiment of Foot, but a year later the regiment disbanded, and St Leger took on the Park Hill estate in Firbeck, where he later bred and raced horses.

== Career ==
From 1768 to 1774, St Leger sat as MP for Grimsby. Two years after leaving the Commons, and with the assistance of Charles Watson-Wentworth, he established a two-mile race for three-year-old horses, on the Cantley Common in Doncaster. This was to become the St. Leger Stakes.

In 1779, St Leger re-entered the army as colonel of the 86th Regiment of Foot. He subsequently achieved the rank of brigadier general, before serving a period as the Governor of Saint Lucia (1781-1783). His last posting was in Ireland, by which time he was a major general.

== Death and legacy ==
St Leger died on 19 April 1786. He was buried in Saint Anne's Church, Dublin.

In addition to giving his name to the St Leger Stakes, the St Leger Arms public house in Laughton en le Morthen (two miles up the road from the Park Hill estate) is also named after Anthony St Leger.

Parliament of Great Britain
Preceded by Joseph Mellish; The Lord Luxborough	Member of Parliament for Great Grimsby; 1768–1774; With: Joseph Mellish	Succeeded by Joseph Mellish; Francis Evelyn Anderson
