= Barry St. Leger =

British Army officer

Barrimore Matthew St. Leger
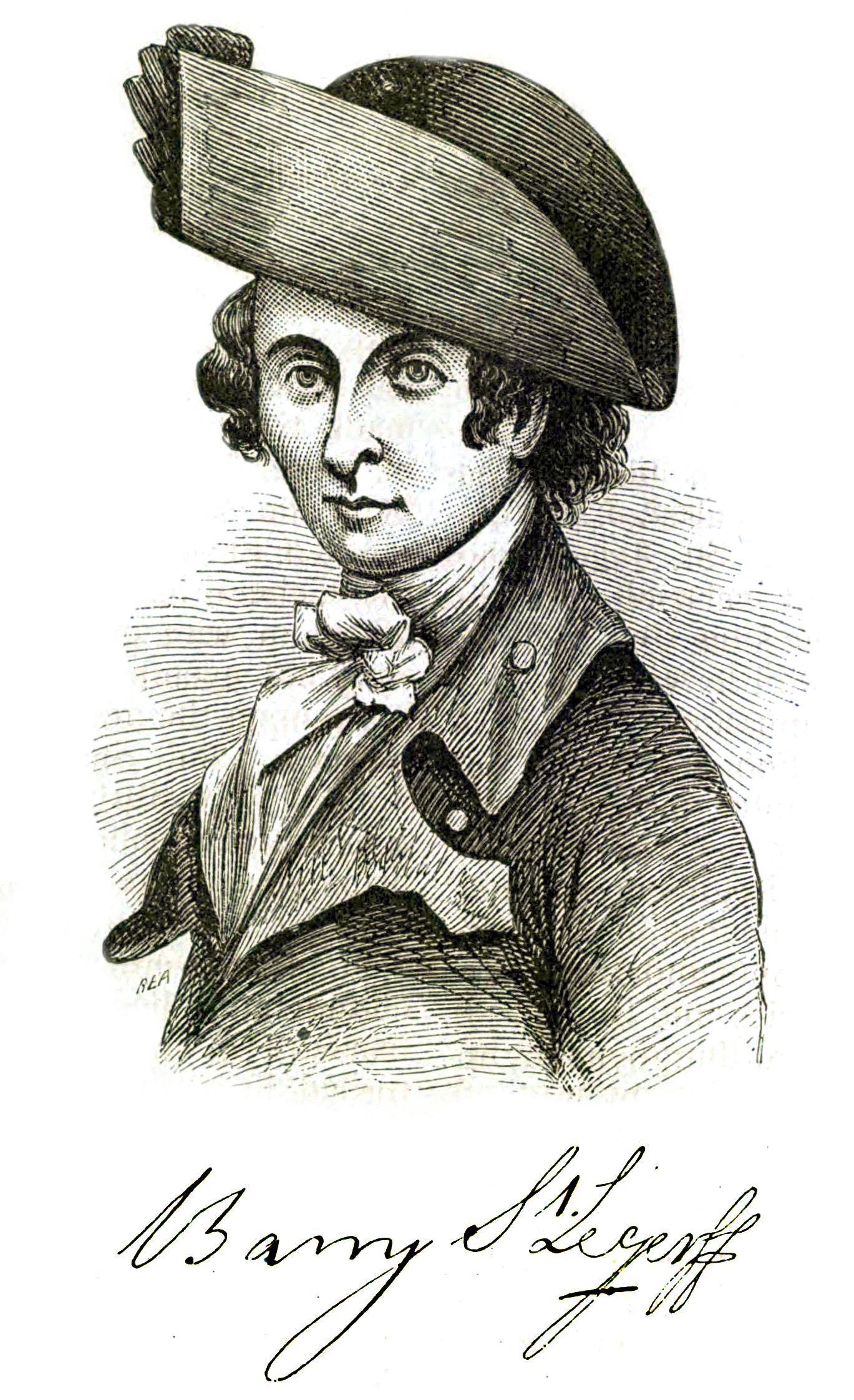
- Barry St. Leger
- Born: 1733; County Kildare, Ireland
- Died: 23 December 1793 (aged 59–60); Worksop, Nottinghamshire, England
- Military career
- Service years: 1756–1788
- Rank: Brevet Brigadier-general
- Conflicts: French and Indian War; Siege of Louisbourg; Siege of Quebec; American Revolutionary War; Saratoga Campaign

Barrimore Matthew "Barry" St. Leger (1 May 1733 – 23 December 1793) was a British Army officer. St. Leger was active in the Saratoga Campaign, commanding an invasion force that unsuccessfully besieged Fort Stanwix. St. Leger remained on the frontier for the duration of the war; after its conclusion, he served briefly as commander of British forces in Quebec.

== Life ==
St. Leger was baptised on 1 May 1733 in County Kildare, Ireland. He was a younger son of Sir John St Leger, a leading Irish judge and politician, and his second wife Lavina Pennefather. He was the brother of Gen. Anthony St Leger (British Army officer), the founder of the St Leger Stakes. The St Legers of Kildare were a junior branch of the family of Viscount Doneraile, and the Pennefathers were a wealthy landowning family in County Tipperary. He was educated at Eton College, and then at Peterhouse, Cambridge.

He joined the British Army in April 1756, serving as an ensign in the 28th Regiment of Foot. He saw service in the French and Indian War under the command of Jeffery Amherst at the 1758 siege of Louisbourg, and in 1759 under the command of James Wolfe at the Siege of Quebec. He was appointed brigade-major in July 1760 and served as a staff officer in the campaign against Montreal under James Murray. On 16 September 1762, St. Leger was promoted to major in the 95th Regiment of Foot.

When the American Revolutionary War began in 1775, St. Leger was a lieutenant colonel in the 34th Regiment of Foot. He saw service in the 1776 British relief of Quebec following the Continental Army's 1775 invasion of that province.

St. Leger was selected to lead the western offensive that formed one leg of the 1777 Saratoga campaign. John Burgoyne breveted him as brigadier general for this mission so that he would outrank the militia officers involved. He moved a mixed force of British regulars, Hessians, Native Americans, French Canadiens, and Loyalists up the Saint Lawrence River to Fort Oswego and from there to Fort Stanwix (the site of modern Rome, New York). The fort was more strongly defended than he and Burgoyne had anticipated, so he laid siege to it. When word arrived that an American relief column was approaching to break the siege, St. Leger sent a group of mostly Native Americans and Loyalists to oppose them. They ambushed Nicholas Herkimer's force in the Battle of Oriskany, but the fort's occupants sortied and raided their camp.

When reports of a relief force under Benedict Arnold reached him, St. Leger was abandoned by his Native supporters and was forced to withdraw to Quebec. He then tried to join with Burgoyne's army near Saratoga but had only reached Fort Ticonderoga by the time Burgoyne surrendered his army in October 1777.

For the next several years, St. Leger was a leader of the British frontier war against the Americans. He was promoted to colonel in 1780. In 1781, he led an attempt to kidnap General Philip Schuyler. He was also involved in the secret negotiations between Frederick Haldimand, Quebec's governor, and the Vermont Republic's leaders over the possibility of bringing Vermont into the British fold. These negotiations ended with the surrender of Cornwallis at Yorktown.

Following the war, St. Leger remained in Quebec and briefly commanded the British forces there in 1784. He resigned his commission the following year due to ill health and died in Worksop, Nottinghamshire, England, on 23 December 1793. His will was proved on 14 February 1794 at the PCC London by Frances St. Leger, widow.

== See also ==
- St. Leger

== Sources ==
- Fredriksen, John C (2001). America's military adversaries: from colonial times to the present. ABC-CLIO. ISBN 978-1-57607-603-3.
