= Shine It All Around =

Single by Strange Sensation and Robert Plant

Single by Robert Plant and the Strange Sensation

from the album Mighty ReArranger
- Released: 5 July 2005
- Recorded: 2005
- Genre: Rock; world
- Length: 4:03
- Label: Sanctuary/Es Paranza
- Songwriter(s): Justin Adams; John Baggot; Robert Plant; Skin Tyson
- Producer(s): Steve Evans

Robert Plant and the Strange Sensation singles chronology
"Last Time I Saw Her" (2003)	"Shine It All Around" (2005)	"The Enchanter" (2005)

"Shine It All Around" is the first single from Robert Plant and the Strange Sensation, from the album Mighty ReArranger.

== Reception ==
The single peaked at #18 on Billboard's Mainstream Rock Songs. World Cafe's David Dye called the track a "favorite". In 2017, Stereogum named it the best song of Plant's solo career. The recording was nominated for the Grammy Award for Best Solo Rock Vocal Performance, losing in the 48th Annual Grammy Awards to Bruce Springsteen's "Devils & Dust".

== "All the Money in the World" ==
The B-side "All the Money in the World", and was the only non-album song to emerge from the sessions aside from remixes.

== Track listing ==
=== CD 1 ===
1. "Shine It All Around"
2. "All the Money in the World"

=== CD 2 ===
1. "Shine It All Around"
2. "Shine It All Around" (The Girls Remix)
3. "Shine It All Around" (U-MYX format)

=== 7" single ===
1. "Shine It All Around"
2. "All the Money in the World"

=== 12" single ===
1. "Shine It All Around"
2. "Tin Pan Valley" (The Girls Remix)
