= Arthur St Leger, 2nd Viscount Doneraile =

Anglo-Irish politician and peer

Arthur St Leger, 2nd Viscount Doneraile (c. 1695 – 13 March 1734) was an Anglo-Irish politician and peer.

St Leger was the eldest son of Arthur St Leger, 1st Viscount Doneraile and Elizabeth Hayes, daughter of John Hayes. He was elected to the Irish House of Commons as the Member of Parliament for Doneraile, sitting between 1715 and 1727. In 1727, he inherited his father's viscountcy and took his seat in the Irish House of Lords.

He married, firstly, Hon. Mary Mohun, daughter of Charles Mohun, 4th Baron Mohun, on 8 June 1717. He married, secondly, Catherine Sarah Conyngham, daughter of Captain John Conyngham, in March 1725. He was succeeded by his eldest son from his first marriage, Arthur. After the death of the fourth Viscount without issue, the title passed to a descendant in the female line.

Parliament of Ireland
Preceded by Sir John St Leger; Bartholomew Purdon	Member of Parliament for Doneraile; 1715–1727; With: William Causabon	Succeeded by John Waller; Jephson Busteed
Peerage of Ireland
Preceded by Arthur St Leger	Viscount Doneraile; 1st creation 1727–1734	Succeeded by Arthur St Leger
