= Hayes St Leger, 4th Viscount Doneraile =

Irish representative peer

Hayes St Leger, 4th Viscount Doneraile (1 October 1818 – 26 August 1887) was a member of the Peerage of Ireland who was an Irish representative peer in the British House of Lords between 1855 and his death.

== Family ==
Doneraile was the son of Hayes St Leger, 3rd Viscount Doneraile and Lady Charlotte Esther Bernard. He married Mary Ann Grace Louisa Lenox-Conyngham, the daughter of George Lenox-Conyngham and Elizabeth Holmes, on 20 August 1851. Their daughter Emily Ursula Clare St Leger married Bernard FitzPatrick, later 2nd Baron Castletown; their other children, Hayes and May, died as infants in 1852 and 1867.

== Career ==
Doneraile succeeded his father as Viscount in 1854. After Viscount Lorton's death later that year, the Irish peers elected Doneraile a representative in his place on 2 May 1855, and he took the oaths at Westminster on 10 May. He was a Conservative and a member of the Carlton Club. Rarely present in Parliament, he voted by proxy for the Earl of Derby's 1857 resolution condemning the conduct of the Second Opium War. He was High Sheriff of County Cork for 1845, a Deputy Lieutenant for County Cork, and was the Honorary Colonel of the North Cork Rifles militia regiment (later the 9th Battalion, King's Royal Rifle Corps) from 25 November 1874. Doneraile was a prominent and frequent fox hunter, and was Master of Fox Hounds at the Burton Hunt in Lincolnshire and President of the Duhallow Hunt in Mallow.

== Rabies death ==
Doneraile kept a pet vixen, which bit him and his coachman, Robert Barrer, on 13 January 1887 and was found to have rabies. At the urging of his son-in-law, Castletown, Doneraile and Barrer travelled to the Pasteur Institute in Paris to receive an experimental post-exposure vaccine. Louis Pasteur was travelling and there was a delay before he was reached in Naples. Doneraile's doubts over the vaccine's risk caused him to vacillate further before allowing Jacques-Joseph Grancher to administer two doses, on 24 January and 21 February. While Barrer survived, Doneraile began to feel unwell on 22 August and to suffer convulsions and delirium on 25 August, dying the following morning at home in Doneraile Court. The relatively late and mild onset of symptoms was attributed at the time to the partial effect of the vaccine. An apocryphal tale is that Doneraile was deliberately smothered as a mercy killing. The death of such a notable fed the controversy over the vaccine. Pasteur in the British Medical Journal blamed its failure on the delay in starting and the fact that Doneraile accepted only a "simple treatment" rather than the recommended "intensive course". Victor Horsley said Doneraile "refused to go through the treatment ordered"; later accounts suggest Doneraile cut short his treatment through boredom or impatience.

Peerage of Ireland
| Preceded by Hayes St Leger | Viscount Doneraile; 2nd creation 1853–1887 | Succeeded by Richard St Leger |
Political offices
| Preceded by The Viscount Lorton | Representative peer for Ireland; 1855–1887 | Succeeded by The Earl of Kingston |
