= Jeffrey Gilbert (judge) =

English judge (1674–1726)

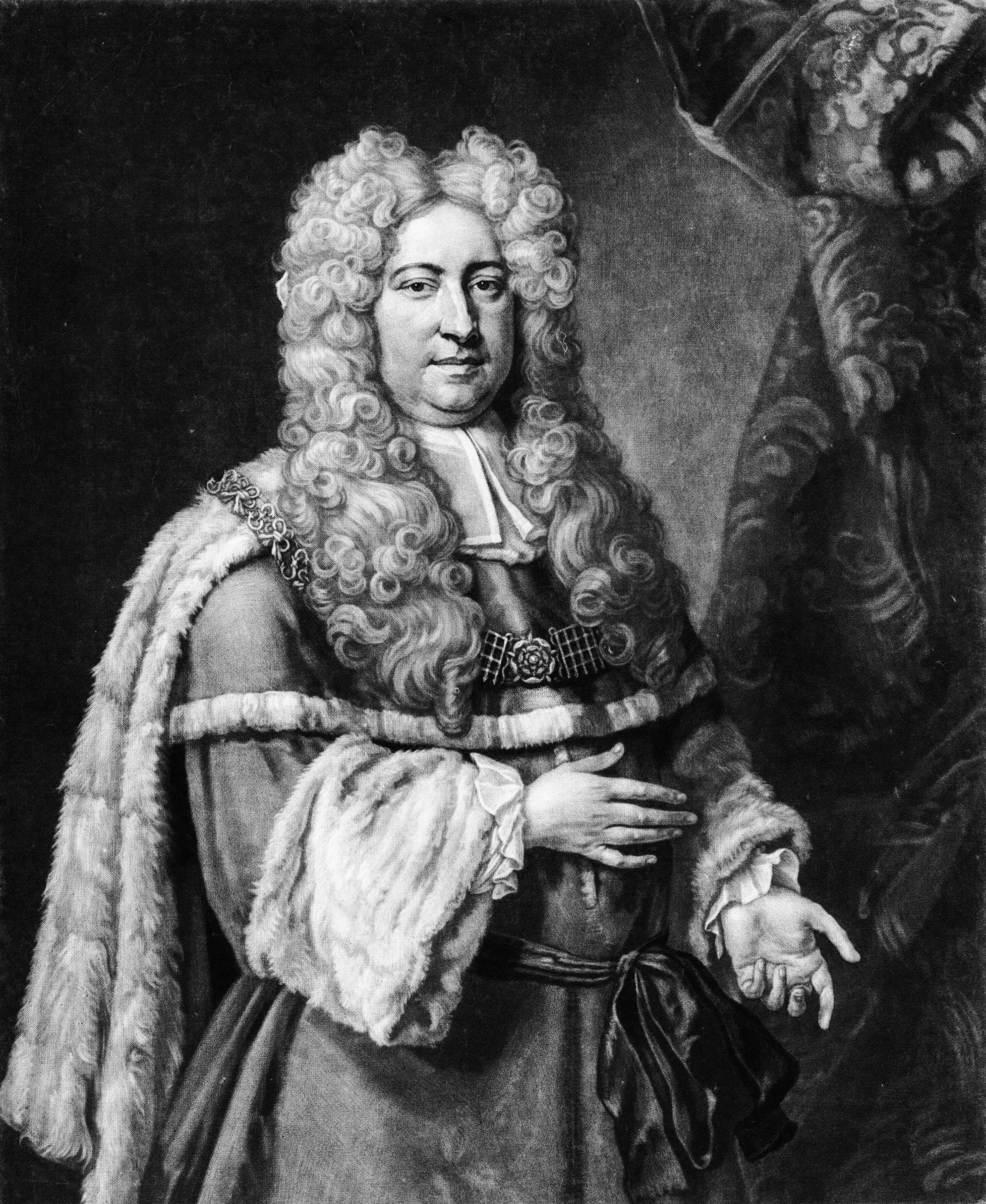
The Right Honourable Jefferay Gilbert. Mezzotint print by John Faber the Younger after an oil painting by Michael Dahl

Sir Jeffrey Gilbert (1674–1726) was an English barrister, judge and author who held office as Lord Chief Baron of the Exchequer in both Ireland and England. While he was serving as a judge in Ireland, a routine judgment he delivered unexpectedly led to a major political crisis, as a result of which he was briefly imprisoned. He later became renowned for his legal treatises, none of which were published in his lifetime.

== Family and early career ==
He was born at Goudhurst in Kent, son of William Gilbert, a farmer, who died a few months after his son's birth; his mother Elizabeth Gibbon is said to have been a cousin of the great historian Edward Gibbon. He was baptised on 10 October 1674.

He was called to the Bar in 1698 and earned some fame as a law reporter. He was an outstanding scholar, his interests including theology and mathematics as well as law: shortly before his death, he became a Fellow of the Royal Society. He enjoyed the patronage of William Cowper, 1st Earl Cowper, who was reappointed as Lord Chancellor in 1714. In February 1715, Gilbert was sent to Ireland as a judge of the Court of King's Bench.

== Judge in Ireland ==
Soon after Gilbert's arrival in Ireland, the Chief Baron of the Irish Exchequer, Joseph Deane, died suddenly. It appears that no Irish-born judge had either the legal ability or the inclination to take on this extremely onerous appointment, which would involve clearing a large backlog of cases in the Court of Exchequer (Ireland), and the reform of legal procedures which were described by one of the contemporary Barons of the Exchequer as amounting to "confusion and disorder almost beyond remedy". Accordingly, Gilbert, who was willing to take up the office, and was highly qualified for it, received the promotion, taking office in July 1715. His early years in Ireland were happy: he received an honorary degree from the University of Dublin and was hailed in ballads as the "darling of the nation".

=== Sherlock v Annesley ===
Gilbert's contentment with his life in Ireland was destroyed when the case of Sherlock v Annesley, first heard on the equity side of the Irish Court of Exchequer in 1709, was referred back to it.This dispute over the ownership of certain lands in Naas was notable only for the determination of both parties (who were cousins) to win it. In pursuit of this aim, they re-opened the sensitive issue of whether the Irish House of Lords or the British was the final court of appeal in Ireland. Unexpectedly, in the phrase of Gilbert's colleague Baron Pocklington, the case "caused a flame to burst forth", and the country's "last resentment" was visited on the Barons of the Exchequer.

The Court of Exchequer had found in favour of Maurice Annesley and ordered that he be put in possession of the lands. After a long delay, his cousin Hester Sherlock's appeal was heard by the Irish House of Lords who reversed the Exchequer and made a decree in her favour. Annesley then appealed to the British House of Lords which restored the original Exchequer order and questioned the right of the Irish House to hear the appeal at all. The Exchequer ordered the High Sheriff of Kildare to put Annesley in possession and, when he refused, they censured him. A similar order was served on Mrs. Sherlock; she again appealed to the Irish House of Lords.

The Irish House summoned the Barons of the Exchequer – Gilbert, John Pocklington and Sir John St Leger – to explain their conduct. Asked what orders he had received from London, Gilbert unwisely relied on the privilege against self-incrimination. The Lords were infuriated and although Lord Midleton, the Lord Chancellor, urged moderation, they voted with only two dissenting voices (Midleton himself and Viscount Doneraile, who was the brother of Baron St Leger, one of the three judges accused) to commit the Barons to the custody of Black Rod; as a further insult they were ordered to pay for their own upkeep.

=== Aftermath ===
After three months Gilbert emerged from custody to find that from having been "the darling of the nation" he had become "the most infamous of men". The British House of Lords responded to the imprisonment of the Barons by passing the Dependency of Ireland on Great Britain Act 1719 (the notorious Sixth of George I) which took away the right of appeal to the Irish House and declared the right of the Parliament of England to make laws for Ireland. Embittered by the loss of their powers, the Lords blamed Gilbert rather than their own provocative behaviour. He was venomously attacked by the influential Archbishop of Dublin, William King, and subjected to a campaign of petty persecution (he complained that while on assize at Longford he found it impossible to secure proper lodgings and had to sleep in the local barracks).

== Judge in England ==
Though he was by now largely friendless in Ireland, Gilbert still had influence in London. It appears he was offered the office of Lord Chancellor of Ireland, but understandably preferred to return to England. He became a puisne Baron of the Exchequer in 1722. When the Great Seal was put in commission upon Macclesfield's fall in 1725, he was appointed a Commissioner of the Great Seal. The same year he became Lord Chief Baron of the Exchequer and was knighted. However he became seriously ill soon afterwards. He died at Bath in October 1726 and was buried in Bath Abbey. He is not known to have married. He had been elected as a Fellow of the Royal Society in May 1726.

There is one known portrait of him in his judicial robes, by the Swedish painter Michael Dahl.

== The treatises ==
Though he was renowned as a scholar, Gilbert published very little in his lifetime. After his death a large collection of his manuscripts was found: these covered almost the whole sphere of English law. Over the coming decades most of them were published, but in a rather haphazard way. This gave rise to some curious stories; in a leading copyright case in 1774, Gilbert's successor as Chief Baron, Sidney Smythe, said he understood that Gilbert left the works to a colleague who employed a journalist to copy them, but that the copyist stole them and sold them to a publisher. While this seems unlikely, it is clear that the quality of the early editions was poor: most of them were full of mistakes so in later editions readers were assured that the editors had corrected the errors.

On the other hand, it is generally agreed that the quality of the writing itself is remarkable: Francis Elrington Ball called Gilbert the most eminent author who ever sat on the Irish Bench.

=== The Law of Evidence ===
The best-known and most influential of Gilbert's treatises is The Law of Evidence: first published in 1754, it went through six further much-expanded editions and remained the leading work on evidence for half a century. William Blackstone was warm in his praise, calling it a book which it was impossible to abridge without destroying its beauty. Its influence declined after Jeremy Bentham singled it out for attack in his own Treatise on Evidence (1825), but it is still regarded as a landmark in the development of evidence as a branch of the law in its own right.

Central to the work is the best evidence rule: despite a few earlier references to this concept, Gilbert can fairly be said to have invented it. He argued that "a man must have the utmost evidence the nature of the fact is capable of.... there can be no demonstration of the fact without the best evidence that the fact is capable of". He formulated the idea of weights or hierarchy of evidence: written evidence has more weight than verbal, and an original document has more weight than a copy (the latter rule is still generally regarded as good law).

=== Other works ===
Blackstone also admired Gilbert's The History and Practice of Civil Law Actions, praising Gilbert's skill in tracing the origin of many modern rules; other critics however deplored the number of mistakes in the book, and questioned whether Gilbert had actually intended to publish it. His Treatise on Tenures was influential in America as well as England; the US Supreme Court in 1815 called it "an excellent work", and the future US President John Adams was studying it intensively in 1758. Gilbert's Treatise on Rents was regarded as authoritative by the Supreme Court of Canada as late as 1951.

=== List of treatises (possibly incomplete) ===
- Law of distresses and replevins 1730
- Law of Uses and Trusts 1733
- Law and Practice of Ejectments 1734
- Reports of cases in Equity and the Exchequer 1734
- The History and Practice of Civil Law Actions particularly in the Court of Common Pleas
- Treatise on Equity 1741
- Law of Evidence 1754
- Two Treatises on the Proceedings in Equity and the Jurisdiction of that Court, 2 vols. (Dublin, 1756–58)
- Treatise on Tenures 1757
- History and Practice of the Court of Chancery 1758
- Treatise on the Court of Exchequer 1758
- Treatise on Rents 1758
- Reports of cases in law and equity, including a Treatise on Debt and a Treatise on the Constitution 1760
- Law of Executions 1763
- Law of devises, last wills and revocations 1792

Legal offices
Preceded by Sir Robert Eyre	Chief Baron of the Exchequer; 1725–1726	Succeeded by Sir Thomas Pengelly
