= Ralph Burton (British Army officer) =

British Army officer

Lieutenant Governor of Trois-Rivières, Quebec District
- In office 1760–1763
- Preceded by: Nicolas-Joseph Novels Fleurimont as Lieutenant of the King
- Succeeded by: Position abolished

Military Governor of Quebec
- In office 1763–1766
- Preceded by: Thomas Gage
- Succeeded by: Position abolished

Personal details
- Born: Unknown - sometime before 1754 Unknown - perhaps Yorkshire, England
- Died: 29 September 1768 Scarborough, Yorkshire, England
- Spouse(s): Elizabeth St Leger m. 1750, d. 1753; Marguerite Lydius m. 1763 – widowed 1768

Military service
- Allegiance: Great Britain
- Branch/service: British Army
- Years of service: 1742–1768
- Rank: Major-general
- Battles/wars: French and Indian War; Siege of Quebec

Major-General Ralph Burton (died 29 September 1768) was a British Army officer.

Burton's military career began in the 2nd Troop of Horse Grenadier Guards, where he rose to the rank of Major, serving under George Augustus Eliott, the defender of Gibraltar In 1754, Burton was appointed Lieutenant Colonel of the 48th Foot, which was involved in the captures of Quebec in 1759 and of Martinique and Havanna in 1762. In 1760, General Jeffery Amherst, Governor General of British North America, appointed him lieutenant governor of the Trois-Rivières district while New France remained under British military rule.

On 31 January 1761, Burton formed the 95th Regiment of Foot in South Carolina from several independent companies. The regiment fought successfully against the Cherokees. It then transferred to Barbados. From there it participated in the capture of Martinique, the occupation of Grenada, and the siege of Havana (1762). The regiment was disbanded in England on 7 March 1763.

Following the return of civilian rule under the newly appointed Governor, General James Murray, Burton was made brigadier (commander) of the army in the new British province of Quebec. He was also made Colonel of the 3rd Foot (the Buffs). After continual conflict with Governor Murray, both he and Burton were recalled to Britain in 1766.

Despite being an influential figure in Canadian military and geopolitical history, little is known about Burton's life outside of the Army. He appears to have been a close friend of John Calcraft, and was elected to Parliament a few months before his death as Member for Wareham, a pocket borough that Calcraft controlled.

He died in 1768. A 1767 will mentions an estate in Yorkshire, England and a townhouse in London. He was twice married: in 1750 to Elizabeth St Leger (died 1753), sister of Anthony St Leger after whom the famous horse race is named, then around 1763 to Marguerite Lydius. He had a son and a daughter by his second marriage. A daughter Mary, his eventual heir, married General Napier Christie, who adopted the surname Burton.

A memorial to Ralph Burton is in St. Mary's Church, Cottingham, East Riding of Yorkshire

Parliament of Great Britain
Preceded by Thomas Erle Drax; John Pitt	Member of Parliament for Wareham; March – September 1768; With: Robert Palk	Succeeded by Whitshed Keene; Robert Palk
Military offices
Preceded by John Craufurd	Colonel of the 3rd Regiment of Foot; 1764–1768	Succeeded by Sir Jeffrey Amherst
