= John Proby (died 1710) =

Arms of Proby: Ermine, on a fess gules a lion passant or

John Proby (c. 1639 – 14 November 1710) of Elton Hall, Huntingdonshire (now in Cambridgeshire) was an English lawyer and independent politician who sat in the English and British House of Commons at various times between 1693 and 1710.

== Early life ==
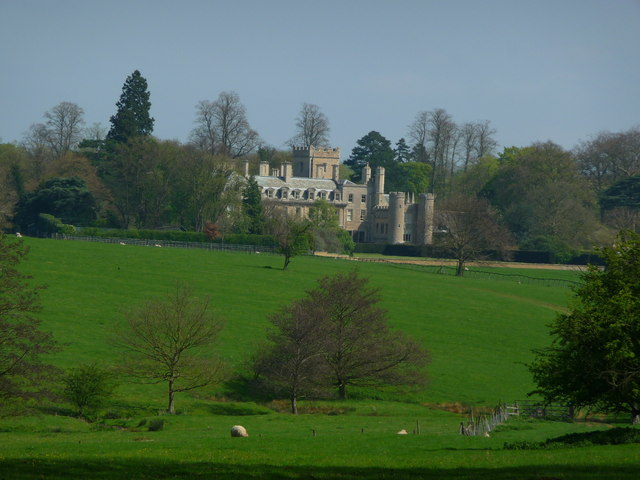
Elton Hall, Cambridgeshire

Proby was baptized on 16 January 1639, the second son of Sir Heneage Proby and his wife Ellen Allen daughter of Edward Allen, of Finchley, Middlesex. He was admitted at Jesus College, Cambridge and at Middle Temple on 2 April 1657. In 1664, he was called to the bar. He was a bencher of his Inn in 1684. He was the grandson of Sir Peter Proby, Lord Mayor of London in 1622, and younger brother of Sir Thomas Proby, 1st Baronet, from whom he inherited Elton Hall in 1689. By 1691, he married Jane Cust, daughter of Sir Richard Cust, 1st Baronet of Blackfriars, Stamford, Lincolnshire.

== Career ==
Proby was returned as Member of Parliament for Huntingdonshire at a by-election on 23 December 1693 on the interest of the Whig Earl of Manchester. He was not very active in Parliament and at the 1695 English general election, he was replaced by a relation of the Duke. He was returned again unopposed at the 1698 English general election and at the two general elections of 1701. He supported a motion on 26 February 1702 to vindicate the Commons' for the impeachment of the Whig ministers, was not put forward by Manchester at the 1702 English general election. From 1698 to 1699 he was treasurer of his Inn.

After six years absence, Proby was returned to Parliament on his own account as MP for Huntingdonshire at a by-election on 31 January 1708 and was re-elected at the 1708 British general election. He stood as an independent, determined to avoid party entanglements, and voted against the impeachment of Dr Sacheverell in 1710. In spite of this, the Earl of Manchester returned him again at the 1710 British general election.

== Death and legacy ==
Proby died on 14 November 1710, aged 71, before the Parliament sat again, and was buried at Elton. He left his unmarried daughter his personal estate, valued at £10,000, together with another £5,000, to be raised by selling property at Old Weston and from rents of his other Huntingdonshire manors. Elton Hall, to which he had added a wing, descended first to his cousin William Proby, governor of Fort St George, and eventually to William's grandson, John Proby, 1st Baron Carysfort.

Parliament of England
Preceded by Robert Montagu; John Dryden	Member of Parliament for Huntingdonshire; 1693–1695; With: John Dryden	Succeeded by Heneage Montagu; Anthony Hammond
Preceded by Anthony Hammond; Robert Apreece	Member of Parliament for Huntingdonshire; 1698–1702; With: Robert Throckmorton 1698–1699; John Dryden 1699–1702	Succeeded by John Dryden; William Naylor
Parliament of Great Britain
Preceded by John Dryden; John Pocklington	Member of Parliament for Huntingdonshire; 1708–1710; With: John Pocklington	Succeeded by John Pocklington; Sir John Cotton
