= Elizabeth Aldworth =

First woman in freemasonry

The Honourable Elizabeth Aldworth
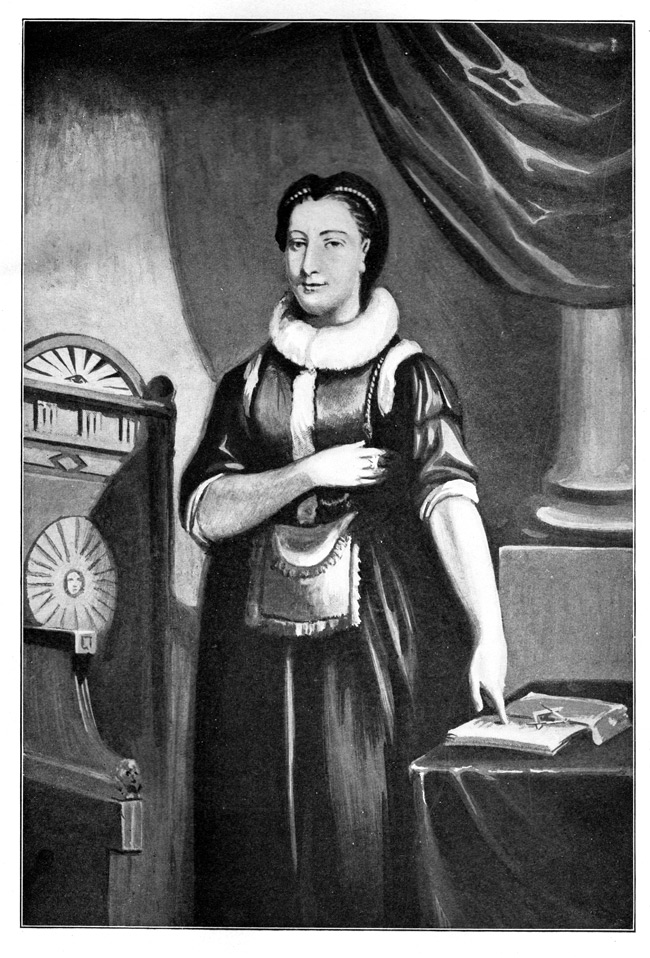
- Aldworth in Masonic regalia, from a mezzotint of 1811
- Born: Elizabeth St Leger; 1693/1695; Doneraile, County Cork, Ireland
- Died: 1773/1775; County Cork, Ireland
- Spouse: Richard Aldworth
- Children: St Leger Aldworth
- Parents: Arthur St Leger, 1st Viscount Doneraile (father); Elizabeth Hayes (mother)

Elizabeth Aldworth (1693/1695 (Note: AQC and Memoir both indicate a birthdate of 1693, while the cathedral plaque indicates 1695.)–1773/1775 (Note: AQC indicates 1773, Memoir and the cathedral plaque both indicate 1775.)), born Elizabeth St Leger, was known in her time as "The Lady Freemason" and was the first recorded woman to be initiated into Regular Freemasonry.

She was the daughter of Arthur St Leger, 1st Viscount Doneraile, of Doneraile Court, County Cork, Ireland and Elizabeth Hayes. She was married in 1713 to Richard Aldworth, Esq., in Newmarket.

During the duration of the Hon. Elizabeth Aldworth, "Whenever a benefit was given at the theatres in Dublin or Cork for the Masonic Female Orphan Asylum, she walked at the head of the Freemasons with her apron and other insignia of Freemasonry, and sat in the front row of the stage box. The house was always crowded on these occasions. Her portrait is in the lodge-room of almost every lodge of Ireland."

== Initiation ==
The date of her initiation into Freemasonry is uncertain, but the Memoir of a Lady Freemason indicates that it was between 1710 and 1712, before her marriage. In his paper in Ars Quatuor Coronatorum in 1895, Edward Conder states that it was sometime between 1710 and 1718.

In a reply to the paper, Masonic scholar William James Hughan stated: "Until Bro. Conder's investigations we had all assumed that the various reports respecting the initiation of the Hon. Elizabeth St. Leger, though not always in agreement, were correct as to the occurrence being of a later date than 1730." Hughan also found the facts related to contradict the statements made by an Aldworth descendant.

Those facts are found in the Memoir, extracted from the records of the First Lodge of Ireland, which state that Arundel Hill was present at the initiation and often sat in the Lodge with her. The Memoir's editor also indicates that Conder's work was the first fixing of the date, which as of 1864 was not known.

Conder posits that the particular Lodge in which she was initiated, while commonly thought at the time of his research to be known, is also unknown, but that it may have been a private Lodge warranted out of London by her father. Conder seems to be refuting an unelaborated-upon statement that Aldworth was initiated after the formation of the Grand Lodge of Ireland. He indicates that since the Viscount died in 1727, she could not have been initiated after that point, and at that time it seems that the commonly accepted date of formation of the Grand Lodge was 1729–30. It is now taken to be 1725.

The tradition of Aldworth's initiation is that Aldworth had fallen asleep while reading on a dim winter evening in the library, which was located next to the room in which the Lodge was meeting. In consequence of construction going on in the library, she was woken by the voices she heard next door, and the light shining through the loose brickwork. She removed some of the bricks and watched the proceedings. When she understood the solemnity of the proceedings, she wished to retreat, but was caught by the Lodge Tyler, who was also the family butler. Realizing her predicament, she screamed and fainted. The tyler summoned the Brethren (among them her father), and they ultimately decided to initiate her into the Lodge.

== Later life and death ==
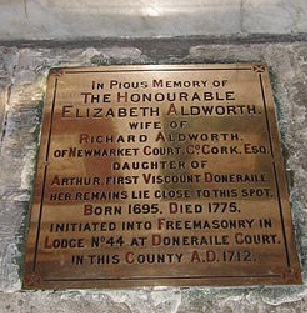
1775 burial in Saint Finbarre's Cathedral

In the reply to Conder's presentation, a Bro. Rylands indicated that "there was no evidence forthcoming" that Aldworth served as Master of a Lodge, or that she regularly attended. Elizabeth Aldworth died in 1775. There was a plaque erected at the new St. Finbarre's Cathedral by the Masons of Cork, which reads:

In Pious Memory of

The Honourable
ELIZABETH ALDWORTH,
Wife of
RICHARD ALDWORTH,
Of Newmarket Court, Co. Cork, Esq.,
Daughter of
ARTHUR, FIRST VISCOUNT DONERAILE.
Her Remains Lie Close to This Spot.
Born 1695, Died 1775.
Initiated into Masonry in
Lodge No. 44, at Doneraile Court
In this county, A.D. 1712. (Note: The editor of Memoir states in a footnote that Doneraile Lodge, No. 44 was founded at Clonmel in 1844, and that the number given is therefore incorrect.)

Some years after Elizabeth's brother Hayes, the fourth Viscount Doneraile died without issue in 1767, the title was revived in favour of Elizabeth's son St Leger Aldworth, who adopted the St Leger surname.

=== Culture ===
She is referred to in James Joyce's Ulysses (Chapter 8)

There was one woman, Nosey Flynn said, hid herself in a clock to find out what they do be doing. But be damned but they smelt her out and swore her in on the spot a master mason. That was one of the Saint Legers of Doneraile.
