= Henry Purdon =

Irish barrister and politician

Henry Purdon (c. 1687–1737) was an Irish barrister, politician and Law Officer of the early eighteenth century. He sat in the Irish House of Commons and held the Crown office of Third Serjeant.

Purdon was born in County Cork, to a junior branch of a family, originally from Cumberland in England, which had acquired substantial lands in County Clare in the sixteenth century; Henry's branch of the family settled at Ballyclogh, County Cork. He was the only son of Adam Purdon and his wife Mary Clayton, daughter of Randall Clayton of Mallow, County Cork, and grandson of Sir Nicholas Purdon (died 1678), who was MP for Baltimore in the time of Charles II, and his wife Alice or Eilis Stephens. Bartholomew Purdon, who was High Sheriff of County Cork in 1708, and MP successively for several County Cork constituencies, was Henry's first cousin. Ballyclogh Tower House, the main family residence, was burnt in the 1690s and rebuilt in the nineteenth century. It is now a ruin.

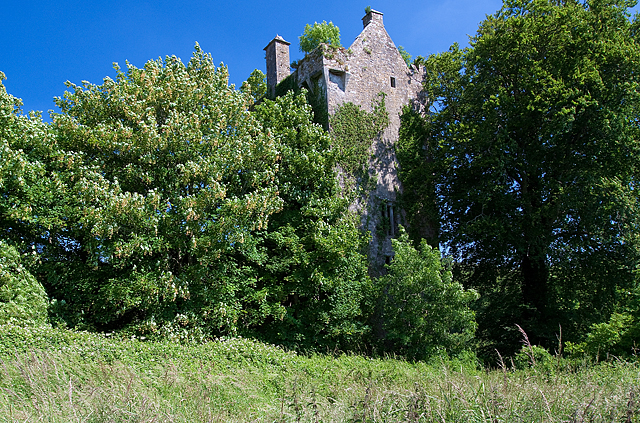
Ballyclogh Tower House

Henry entered the Middle Temple in 1707. He was called to the Bar and became King's Counsel in 1716. He was MP for Charleville 1721–27.

In 1725 the House of Commons resolved that Joseph Nagle, a prominent but controversial Cork solicitor of known Jacobite sympathies, should be committed to prison for breach of Parliamentary privilege, on account of his authorship of a pamphlet entitled The Case of Joseph Nagle, which Purdon claimed was a malicious libel on him in his official capacity, and therefore an attack on the dignity of the House of Commons itself. The House, noting that the pamphlet "reflected highly" on Purdon's honour, accepted that the pamphlet was a malicious attack on its own privilege.

He was made Third Serjeant-at-law in 1730 and held that office until his death in December 1737. He is thought to have been the last Irish Serjeant to act as "messenger" to the House of Commons i.e. he advised the Commons on points of law, just as the High Court judges advised the Irish House of Lords. His appointment as Serjeant-at-law was unusual in that he was no longer a sitting MP: normally one of the functions of the Serjeant was to manage Government business in the Commons, and so he was as a rule chosen from the sitting MPs.

He was made a burgess of the town of Kinsale in 1733, and was a Major in the Irish Yeomanry. His principal residence was at Little Island, Cork.

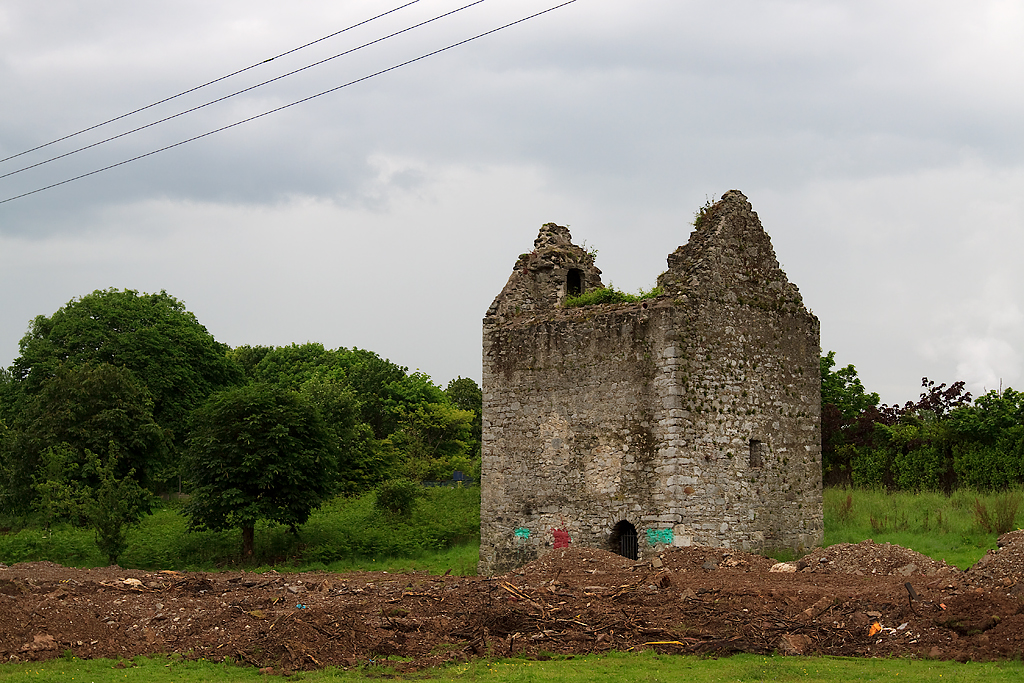
Ruined Castle at Little Island, Cork

He married a daughter of Henry Boreman, or Boverton (died 1701), his predecessor as MP for Charleville, but had no children. His last will, dated shortly before his death in 1737, still exists.

Our only glimpse of Purdon's personal character, his move to commit the solicitor Joseph Nagle to prison for an alleged libel, suggests that he was a somewhat arrogant and vindictive individual. On the other hand, as the wording of the resolution shows, his fellow MPs clearly regarded Nagle's conduct as an attack on the House of Commons as a whole, and thus deserving of punishment. Further, Nagle (an uncle of Nano Nagle) was strongly suspected of being a Jacobite conspirator, and had few friends in Parliament or amongst the Protestant ruling class generally.

== Sources ==
- Hart, A. R. History of the King's Serjeants at law in Ireland Dublin Four Courts Press 2000
- Johnston-Liik, Edith Mary MPs in Dublin: Companion to History of the Irish Parliament 1692-1800 Ulster Historical Foundation 2006
- Journal of the Cork Historical and Archaeological Society
- Journal of the House of Commons of the Kingdom of Ireland Dublin 1763
- Smyth, Constantine Joseph Chronicle of the Law Officers of Ireland London 1839
