= St Leger St Leger, 1st Viscount Doneraile =

Anglo-Irish politician

St Leger St Leger, 1st Viscount Doneraile, 2nd creation (born St Leger Aldworth; died 15 May 1787) was an Anglo-Irish politician and peer, who was a member of Parliament for Doneraile from 1749 to 1776. He is known for his conviction for assaulting a Catholic priest, and for challenging the prosecuting counsel, John Philpot Curran, to a duel.

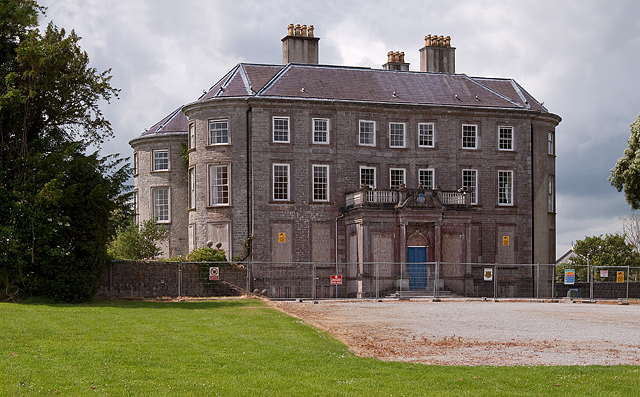
Doneraile Court - seat of the Viscounts Doneraile

== Life and career ==
He was the son of Richard Aldworth by his wife Elizabeth, a daughter of Arthur St Leger, 1st Viscount Doneraile (d. 1727), of the first creation (1703) of that title.

He was given the name of St Leger Aldworth at birth, but he legally changed his surname to St Leger on 9 May 1767, so that he become known as St Leger St Leger, as a condition of succeeding to the Doneraile estates in County Cork upon the death of his childless uncle, Hayes St Leger, 4th Viscount Doneraile. Like several other members of his family, he served in the Irish House of Commons as the Member of Parliament for Doneraile, sitting between 1749 and 1776.

On 2 July 1776, St Leger was created Baron Doneraile in the Peerage of Ireland. On 5 January 1785, the title previously held by his maternal relations was recreated for his benefit so that so that St Leger St Leger is known as the 1st Viscount Doneraile, 2nd creation.

In 1780, St Leger found himself in the County Cork Assizes facing John Philpot Curran, counsel for an elderly Catholic priest. Father Neale had announced the excommunication of an adulterous parishioner who happened be the brother of St Leger's mistress. St Leger rode to the priest’s house and demanded that he withdraw the sanction. When the priest explained that it could be lifted only by his bishop, St Leger thrashed him with his horsewhip. He also whipped the ageing housekeeper who interceded on the priest's behalf.

St Leger would have acted in the belief that no jury, which under the existing Penal Laws would be all Protestant, would rule against him in a suit pressed by a Catholic. In cross examination Curran demolished the credibility of Doneraile's witnesses and persuaded the jury to set aside sectarian consideration and find for his client. The jury awarded Father Neale 30 guineas. St Leger challenged Curran to a duel, in which St Leger fired and missed. Curran declined to fire.

== Marriage, children and succession ==
He married Mary Barry, the daughter of Redmond Barry, and together they had six children, including Hayes St Leger.

Parliament of Ireland
Preceded by William Harward; Sir John Colthurst, 1st Baronet	Member of Parliament for Doneraile; 1749–1776; With: John St Leger; Richard Aldworth; Hayes St Leger	Succeeded by Hayes St Leger; Richard St Leger
Peerage of Ireland
New creation	Viscount Doneraile; 2nd creation 1785–1787	Succeeded by Hayes St Leger
New creation	Baron Doneraile; 1776–1787	Succeeded by Hayes St Leger
