= 86th Regiment of Foot (Rutland Regiment) =

- Active: 1779–1783
- Country: Kingdom of Great Britain (1707–1800)
- Branch: British Army
- Type: Infantry

The 86th Regiment of Foot (Rutland Regiment) was a British regiment raised for service in the American Revolutionary War.

It was raised in England in July 1779 by Charles Manners, 4th Duke of Rutland, in the area around Newark, Nottinghamshire and Grantham, Lincolnshire. The colonel was Anthony St Leger. The regiment had yellow facings on their red coats. It was sent to the Leeward Islands in January 1780. Five companies stationed on Tobago were captured June 1781.

The regiment returned to England and was disbanded in 1783 at York.
