= Sir John Cotton, 4th Baronet, of Connington =

Sir John Cotton, 4th Baronet (c. 1680 – 5 February 1731) was an English landowner and politician who sat in the House of Commons of England and the House of Commons of Great Britain at various times between 1705 and 1713.

He was the son of John Cotton and Frances Downing. His father was the eldest son of Sir John Cotton, 3rd Baronet, of Connington, and his first wife Dorothy Anderson. His mother was the daughter of the eminent statesman and financier Sir George Downing, 1st Baronet and his wife Frances Howard.

He married Elizabeth Herbert, daughter of the Hon. James Herbert (1660-1704 - the son of James Herbert of Kingsey (1623-77) who in turn was a son of Philip Herbert, 4th Earl of Pembroke), and Lady Catherine Osborne, daughter of Thomas Osborne, 1st Duke of Leeds. They had no issue: on his death, the title passed to his uncle Robert.

He was a Member of Parliament (MP) for Huntingdon from 1705 to 1706, and for Huntingdonshire from 1710 to 1713.

== Notes ==
Parliament of England
| Preceded by The Earl of Orrery; Anthony Hammond | Member of Parliament for Huntingdon; 1705–1706; With: Sir Edward Wortley Montagu | Succeeded by Sir Edward Wortley Montagu; John Pedley |
Parliament of Great Britain
| Preceded by John Proby; John Pocklington | Member of Parliament for Huntingdonshire; 1710–1713; With: John Pocklington | Succeeded by Sir Matthew Dudley, Bt; Robert Pigott |
Baronetage of England
| Preceded by John Cotton | Baronet (of Connington); 1702–1731 | Succeeded by Robert Cotton |
