= Doneraile =

Town in County Cork, Ireland

Doneraile Dún ar Aill
- Town
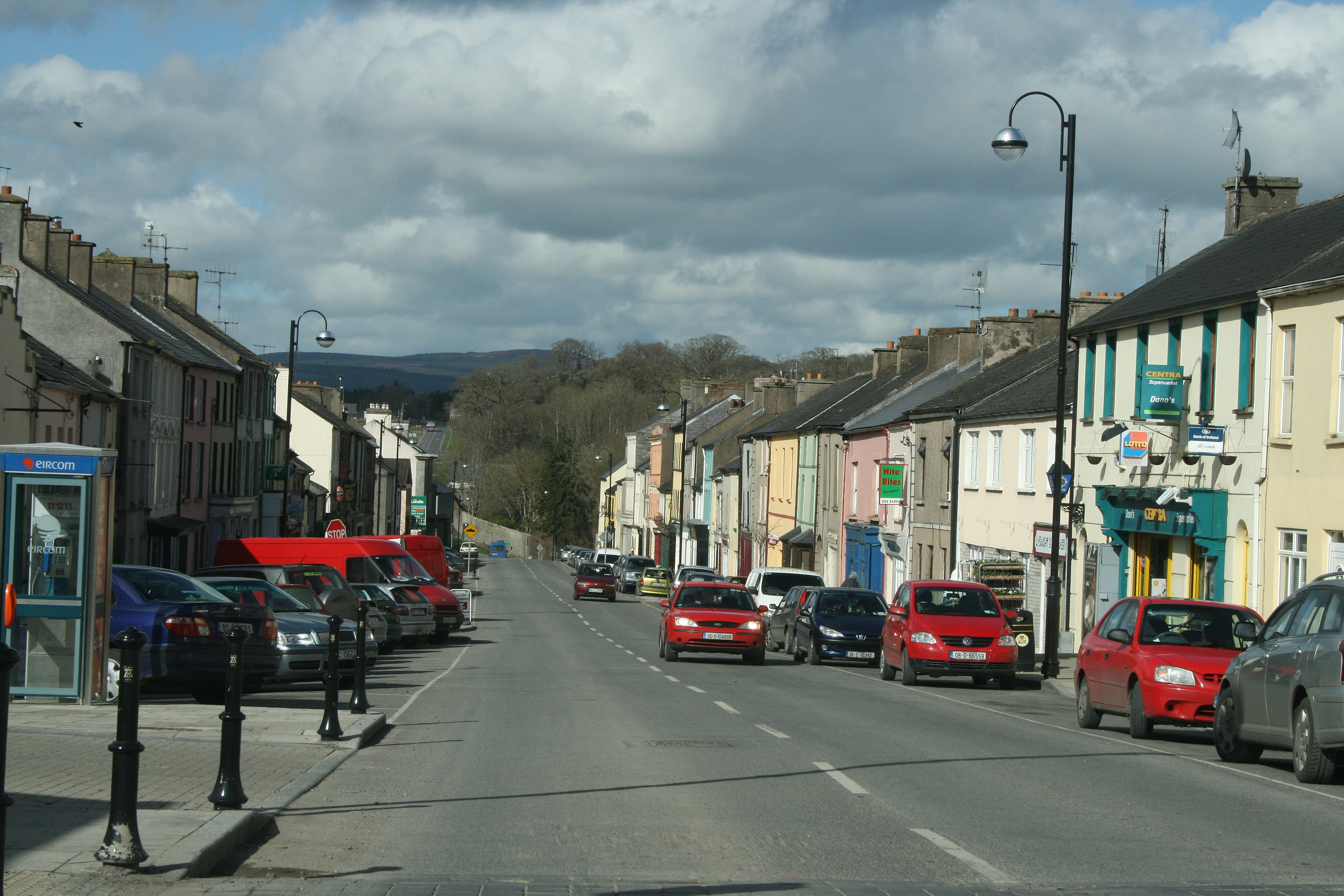
- Doneraile's main street

- Location in Ireland
- Coordinates: 52.2172°N 8.5847°W
- Country: Ireland
- Province: Munster
- County: County Cork
- Elevation: 269 ft (82 m)

Population (2022 census)
  - Total: 857
- Time zone: UTC+0 (WET)
  - Summer (DST): UTC-1 (IST (WEST))
- Irish Grid Reference: R601074

Historical population
Year	Pop.	±%
1821	2,456	—
1831	2,652	+8.0%
1841	2,722	+2.6%
1851	1,856	−31.8%
1861	1,475	−20.5%
1871	1,314	−10.9%
1881	1,208	−8.1%
1891	833	−31.0%
1901	797	−4.3%
1911	829	+4.0%
1926	809	−2.4%
1936	740	−8.5%
1946	801	+8.2%
1951	775	−3.2%
1956	745	−3.9%
1961	725	−2.7%
1966	710	−2.1%
1971	799	+12.5%
1981	920	+15.1%
1986	846	−8.0%
1991	815	−3.7%
1996	761	−6.6%
2002	800	+5.1%
2006	759	−5.1%

Doneraile (Irish: Dún ar Aill, meaning 'fort of the cliff'), historically Dunnerail, is a town in County Cork, Ireland. It is about 10 km (6 mi) north of Mallow town (13 km (8 mi) via the N20 and R581 roads). It is on the River Awbeg, a branch of the Blackwater. The town is in a townland and civil parish of the same name, and is part of the Cork East Dáil constituency.

== Name ==
The town sits on the northern slope of Knockacur hill, which rises by a gentle slope from the Awbeg river and gradually ascends to a rocky prominence. However, it was not this rocky prominence but one near the graveyard of Oldcourt which together with an ancient fort built thereon, gave the town its name, Doneraile, i.e. "Dún ar Aill", meaning "the fort on the cliff".

In a land transfer record from 1636, covering an agreement between members of the Synan and St. Ledger families, the land was referred to as "Downerayle... now in the actual and real possession of the said Wm. St. Leger".

== History ==
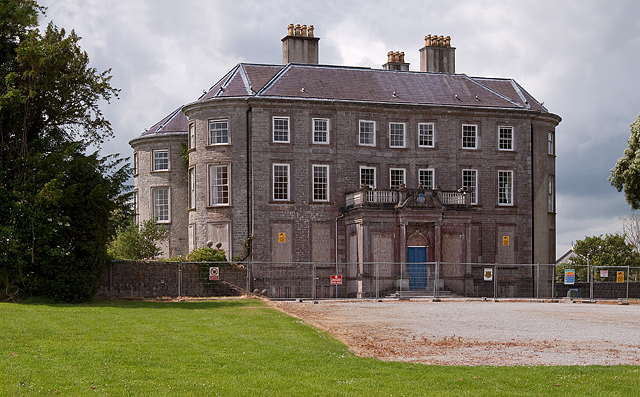
Doneraile Court, whose construction started in the 1640s

The horse race known as the steeplechase originated in 1752 as a result of a race between the church steeples of the town and neighbouring Buttevant town.

There are only a few reported cases of women becoming Freemasons but one exception occurred in 18th century Doneraile. Elizabeth Aldworth, was reported to have surreptitiously viewed the proceedings of a Lodge meeting held at Doneraile Court — the private house of her father, Arthur St Leger, 1st Viscount Doneraile. Upon discovering the breach of their secrecy, the Lodge resolved to admit and obligate her, and thereafter she proudly appeared in public in Masonic clothing.

In 1829, the shooting of a local doctor, John Norcott, led to rumours of a widespread conspiracy to murder local landlords. On the word of an informer, twenty-one local men were arrested and charged with the alleged crime. Most were fortunate enough to be defended by Daniel O'Connell, who secured the acquittal of the majority of them. The event came to be known as the Doneraile conspiracy.

Doneraile is also where Ireland's first successful agricultural co-operative and creamery was established in 1889 by Horace Plunkett.

During the early part of May 1853, a countryman ploughing in the neighbourhood turned up a large quantity of silver coins, amounting to more than forty-six ounces in weight, which were purchased by a silversmith in Cork. They consisted of English shillings and sixpences of Elizabeth, with a few groats, threepences and half-groats of the same queen; also a few groats of her predecessors, Mary, and Philip and Mary both having the bust of Mary; English shillings and sixpences of James 1, upon the union with Scotland and exclusively of the rose, thistle, and fleur-de-lis mint marks; with a large number of the quarter-dollars and smaller money of Ferdinand and Isabella of Spain. Nearly all the coins were in the finest state of preservation, and appeared to have been but little used or in circulation.

Doneraile also achieved note in 1954 when a British journalist, Honor Tracy, condemned the local priest Canon Maurice O'Connell for spending the then exorbitant amount of £9000 on his parochial house while there was so much poverty in the village. Following The Sunday Times' apology to O'Connell, Tracy sued the publication and was awarded £3000 in compensation. In response some 3000 of Doneraile's parishioners marched in the village in support of Canon O'Connell.

== Education ==
Canon Sheehan Primary School is the only primary school located in Doneraile. The school was established in 2016 after the amalgamation of two former primary schools in Doneraile; Presentation Primary School and St Joseph's CBS Primary School.

Nagle Rice Secondary School is the only secondary school in Doneraile, which has been opened since 24 September 1993 and is co-educational.

== Twinning agreements ==
Doneraile is twinned with Ramapo, New York.

== Notable people ==
- Elizabeth Aldworth (1690s–1770s), "The Lady Freemason"
- Thomas Croke (1824–1902), Archbishop of Cashel and Emly in Ireland and Land League activist was parish priest in Doneraile
- Donncha Ó Dúlaing (1933–2021), broadcaster
- John B. Keane (1928–2002), Kerry-born writer, worked in Doneraile during the 1950s as an assistant for the local antiques dealer and chemist, and occasionally attending the petrol pumps outside.
- Patrick Augustine Sheehan (1852–1913), priest, author and political activist

== See also ==
- List of populated places in Ireland
- Doneraile (Parliament of Ireland constituency)
