= John Pocklington (MP) =

English lawyer and Whig politician

John Pocklington (1658–1731) was an English lawyer and Whig politician who sat in the English and British House of Commons between 1695 and 1713. He was appointed a Welsh circuit judge in 1707 and a judge of the Court of Exchequer (Ireland) in 1714, as a result of which he settled in Ireland. He suffered from chronic ill health, and was imprisoned on the orders of the Irish House of Lords in 1719, during a major Constitutional crisis. His descendants, who adopted the surname Domvile, were wealthy landowners in Templeogue, south County Dublin.

== Early life ==
Pocklington was born in Nottingham, the eldest son of Rev. Oliver Pocklington, a clergyman who came originally from Brington, Cambridgeshire, and his wife, Katherine Towers, of Castle Ashby, Northamptonshire.

His grandfather, John Pocklington, was also a clergyman and a noted polemicist during the controversies leading up to the English Civil War, who argued strongly in support of the ecclesiastical policies of Archbishop William Laud. He was deprived of his living by the Long Parliament shortly before his death in 1642.

The younger John went to school in Peterborough, and was admitted at St John's College, Cambridge on 27 October 1674. He entered Middle Temple on 24 May 1677 and was called to the Bar in 1684.

He married Mary Hatton, eldest daughter of Sir Thomas Hatton, 2nd Baronet of Longstanton, Cambridgeshire, and his wife Bridget Goring, by licence dated 15 May 1689.

== Career ==
Pocklington was returned as Member of Parliament for Huntingdon at the 1695 English general election. He was a very active member but was not put forward for election at 1698 English general election. He stood for Huntingdon again in the interest of Edward Montagu, 3rd Earl of Sandwich at the 1702 English general election, but was defeated by two Tories.

At the 1705 English general election he was put up as MP for Huntingdonshire and was returned unopposed. He voted for the Court candidate in the division on choosing the Speaker on 25 October 1705, and for the Court side in the vote on the ‘place clause’ of the Regency Bill on 18 February 1706.

Pocklington was appointed as second justice of the palatine court of Chester in 1707 at a salary of £400 p.a., on the recommendation of Charles Montagu, 1st Duke of Manchester. Pocklington was returned again as Whig MP for Huntingdonshire at the 1708 British general election. He supported the naturalization of the German Palatines in 1709, and voted for the impeachment of Dr Henry Sacheverell in 1710.

On this account, he suffered various insults while on the circuit during the summer of 1710. Pocklington was chosen again for Huntingdonshire at the 1710 British general election, after the Duke of Manchester had arranged an electoral pact with John Proby, a more independent-minded Whig. He voted against the French commerce bill on 18 June 1713, but was not put up again in the 1713 British general election.

== Judge in Ireland ==
Pocklington's career in England reached its low point in 1713, when he lost both his seat in Parliament and his place on the Bench, but a new career opened up for him in 1714. On the death of Queen Anne her Irish judges were dismissed en bloc for their adherence to the Tory party. Yet suitable replacements for judicial office were not easy to find in Ireland: "God help the country!" was the general reaction to the appointment of one of the new Irish-born judges. The promotion of English Whig lawyers to the Irish Bench was the obvious alternative, and Pocklington agreed to serve: he was soon joined as Chief Baron of the Irish Exchequer by an old friend, Sir Jeffrey Gilbert. Both men became popular in Ireland and their first years in the country were described as "halcyon".

=== Sherlock v Annesley ===
Pocklington's contentment with his life in Ireland was shattered when a seemingly routine lawsuit, Sherlock v Annesley, where two cousins disputed the right to the possession of certain lands in County Kildare, created a major crisis in government: in Pocklington's own memorable phrase: "a flame burst forth and the country's last resentment fell upon us (the Barons)". By bringing separate appeals to the Irish and the British House of Lords, the litigants reopened an old dispute as to which House was the final court of appeal for Ireland. The two Houses issued contradictory orders to the Barons of the Irish Exchequer – Gilbert, Pocklington and Sir John St Leger – who felt obliged to implement the British decree. They were summoned by the Irish House of Lords to explain their conduct, and after an impassioned hearing they were committed to the custody of Black Rod for contempt of Parliament. Pocklington, who has been described as "something of a prig", with a habit of irritating his listeners by delivering pompous lectures, is unlikely to have made a good impression on the Lords. He was in custody for three months, which may have contributed to his later ill health. The British Parliament responded by passing the Declaratory Act 1719 (popularly known as the "sixth of George I") removing the Irish House of Lords' right to hear judicial appeals: this inflamed the public mood of anger and bitterness even further, and Pocklington and his colleagues were viciously insulted.

== Later life ==
After regaining his freedom Pocklington might well have been expected to return to England, as Sir Jeffrey Gilbert soon did: but he was happy to continue living in Ireland, where he had bought an estate near Celbridge. He lobbied unsuccessfully to become Chief Justice of the Irish Common Pleas in 1720. He made occasional visits to England, but his health was failing. He felt well enough to go on the Munster assize in 1724, but suffered a "paralytic seizure" at Limerick, and the following year he was confined to his house for several months. In July 1731 his name appears as one of the trustees of the King's Inns.

== Death and legacy ==
Pocklington died on 22 October 1731 and was buried in Finglas. By his wife Mary Hatton he had one son, Christopher, who became an Admiral in the Irish Navy. Christopher married Elizabeth, daughter of Sir Thomas Domvile, and heiress of the Domvile baronets of Templeogue. Their descendants, who took the Domvile name, inherited the substantial Domvile estates in south County Dublin, and were later made the Domvile baronets of the second creation.

== Sources ==
- Ball, F. Elrington The Judges in Ireland 1221-1921 John Murray London 1926
- Cambridge Alumni Database
- Cokayne Complete Baronetage Vol. 2 1900
- Kenny, Colum King's Inns and the Kingdom of Ireland Irish Academic Press Dublin 1992
- Lemmings, David Gentlemen and Barristers: the Inns of Court and the English Bar 1680-1730 Oxford University Press 1990
- Lyall, Andrew The Irish House of Lords as a Judicial Body 1783-1800 Irish Jurist new series Vol. 23-25 (1993-1995)
- The History of Parliament: the House of Commons 1690-1715

Parliament of England
| Preceded by Hon. Richard Montagu; Hon. Sidney Wortley-Montagu | Member of Parliament for Huntingdon –1698; With: Hon. Richard Montagu 1695-1697; Francis Wortley-Montagu 1697-1698 | Succeeded by Francis Wortley-Montagu; Edward Carteret |
| Preceded by William Naylor; John Dryden | Member of Parliament for Huntingdonshire; 1705–1707; With: John Dryden | Succeeded by Parliament of Great Britain |
Parliament of Great Britain
| Preceded by Parliament of England | Member of Parliament for Huntingdonshire; 1707–1713; With: John Dryden 1707-1710; Sir John Cotton, Bt 1710-1713 | Succeeded by Sir Matthew Dudley, Bt; Robert Pigott |
