= Ballyclogh, County Cork =

Village in County Cork, Ireland

Ballyclogh Baile Cloch
- Village
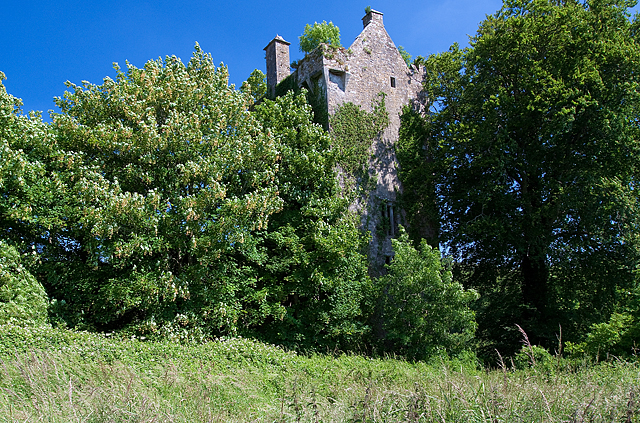
- Ballyclogh tower house

- Location in Ireland
- Coordinates: 52°10′03″N 08°44′35″W
- Country: Ireland
- Province: Munster
- County: County Cork

Population (2016)
  - Total: 259

Ballyclogh or Ballyclough (Irish: Baile Cloch, meaning 'town of the stones') is a small village 8 km (5 mi) outside Mallow, County Cork, Ireland. The name Ballyclogh has its origins in the past abundance of stone quarries in the area. The village is in a townland and civil parish of the same name. Ballyclogh is part of the Cork East Dáil constituency.

The village has a tower house, built by the Barry family (or Mac Robert-Barry). In 1641 it was forfeit to the Purdon family, who produced a number of politicians, including Sir Nicholas Purdon (died 1678) and his grandsons Bartholomew Purdon and Henry Purdon. While it was surrendered to the Williamites in 1691, the Purdons later regained possession of the tower house. It was largely destroyed by fire soon afterwards, before being renovated during the 19th century. It is now in ruins.

The village today has a public house, a local grocer, a community centre, a playground, a funeral chapel and a Catholic church. Ballyclogh has a rich history of farming; Ballyclogh Creamery was founded in the early 1900s and grew to join forces with Mitchelstown Co-op to form Dairygold Co-Op.

The Rev Samuel Hayman (1818–1886) noted that when first mentioned in 1291 it was called "Labane" – meaning the "fair district", and acquired the name Ballyclogh when the local castle was built by the Barry family in 1591. Another 19th-century antiquarian, the Rev JF Lynch, wrote that "Ballyclogh is named Lathbán in taxation of 1302, and in taxation of 1306 is named Lachbán, and this 'Lathbán' or 'Lachbán' is given as 'Lavan' by Lewis, who names this parish 'Ballyclough or Lavan'". An area close to village centre still goes by the name 'Lachbán' - (pronounced Ly-bawn), just west of the 'Smithfield' area and approximately 400 metres from the castle.

== See also ==
- List of towns and villages in Ireland
