= Hayes St Leger, 3rd Viscount Doneraile =

Anglo-Irish peer

Hayes St Leger, 3rd Viscount Doneraile (9 May 1786 – 27 March 1854) was an Anglo-Irish peer.

Doneraile was the son of Hayes St Leger, 2nd Viscount Doneraile and Charlotte Bernard. He married Lady Charlotte Esther Bernard, daughter of Francis Bernard, 1st Earl of Bandon and Lady Catherine Henrietta Boyle, on 14 June 1816. On 8 November 1819, he inherited his father's viscountcy and was elected as an Irish representative peer to the House of Lords in 1830. He served as an officer in the South Cork Militia (a regiment raised by his father in 1793), becoming its Colonel on 18 April 1848.

Peerage of Ireland
Preceded by Hayes St Leger	Viscount Doneraile; 2nd creation 1819–1854	Succeeded by Hayes St Leger
Political offices
Preceded by The Marquess of Headfort	Representative peer for Ireland; 1830–1853	Succeeded by The Earl of Bantry
