= South Cork Light Infantry =

Auxiliary unit of the British Army

South Cork Militia South Cork Light Infantry 3rd Bn, Royal Munster Fusiliers 4th (ER) Bn, Royal Munster Fusiliers
- Active: March 1793–31 July 1922
- Country: Ireland (1793–1800); United Kingdom (1801–1922)
- Branch: Irish Militia
- Role: Infantry
- Size: Battalion
- Part of: Royal Munster Fusiliers
- Garrison/HQ: Rathcormac; Bandon; Kinsale
- Engagements: Irish Rebellion of 1798: Battle of Vinegar Hill; Battle of Goff's Bridge; Second Boer War

The South Cork Light Infantry was a regiment of the Irish Militia raised in County Cork in 1793. It saw action during the Irish Rebellion of 1798. It later became a battalion of the Royal Munster Fusiliers (RMF) and served in South Africa during the Second Boer War. During World War I it trained reinforcements for the RMF battalions serving overseas. It was disbanded in 1922 following Irish Independence.

== Precursors ==
Although there are scattered references to town guards and local units, no organised militia existed in Ireland before 1660. After the Stuart Restoration more formal militia forces were organised. In August 1666 the Lord Lieutenant, the Duke of Ormond, made a 'progress' through County Cork and was accompanied by the horse militia of each barony. During the Williamite War in Ireland the Governor of Cork, Sir Richard Cox, increased the militia of the county to three regiments of foot (6000 men) and 26 independent troops of horse in 1691, which played an active part in the fighting. In 1715 the Irish Militia came under statutory authority, but its numbers fell away until the War of American Independence when, with a serious threat of invasion by the Americans' allies, France and Spain, Ireland had no national militia. It was not until the outbreak of the French Revolutionary War In 1793 that the Irish administration passed an effective Militia Act that created an official Irish Militia. The new Act was based on existing English precedents, with the men being conscripted by ballot to fill county quotas (paid substitutes were permitted) and the officers having to meet certain property qualifications.

== South Cork Militia ==
=== French Revolutionary War ===
In March 1793 County Cork was given a quota of 1464 men to find, to be organised into three regiments each of 488 men in 8 companies:

- South Cork Militia at Rathcormac
- North Cork Militia at Fermoy
- Royal Cork City Militia at Cork

Hayes St Leger, 2nd Viscount Doneraile, was appointed Colonel of the South Cork Militia on 25 April 1793, but the new militia was widely unpopular, and Cork was one of the slower counties to fill its quota, despite Lord Doneraile offering bounties to volunteers. The order to embody the three regiments for service was not issued until 30 September 1793 and it was not carried out until 15 October. In 1795 the Irish militia was augmented, and each of the County Cork regiments was raised to an establishment of 612 men.

The French Revolutionary and Napoleonic Wars saw the British and Irish militia embodied for a whole generation, becoming regiments of full-time professional soldiers (though restricted to service in Britain or Ireland respectively), which the regular army increasingly saw as a prime source of recruits. They served in coast defences, manned garrisons, guarded prisoners of war, and carried out internal security duties. In August 1794 the South Cork regiment was widely dispersed in small garrisons across Counties Leitrim and Roscommon, at Carrick-on-Shannon (2 companies), Ballinamore, Cloone and Mohil (2), Boyle (3), Elphin and Strokestown (1).

In 1797 the light companies of the militia were detached to join composite battalions drawn from several militia and regular regiments. The light companies of the three Cork regiments joined 1st Light Battalion. The militia regiments were each issued with two light six-pounder 'battalion guns', with the gun detachments trained by the Royal Artillery. When the militiamen of 1793 reached the end of their four-year enlistment in 1797, most of the Irish regiments were able to maintain their numbers through re-enlistments (for a bounty).

Anxiety about a possible French invasion grew during the autumn of 1796 and preparations were made for field operations. A large French expeditionary force appeared in Bantry Bay on 21 December and troops from all over Ireland were marched towards the threatened area. The South Cork regiment took part in a forced march by units from Limerick to meet this threat. Soon afterwards news arrived that the French fleet had been scattered by the winter storms. Several ships had been wrecked and none of the French troops succeeded in landing; there was no sign of a rising by the United Irishmen. The invasion was called off on 29 December, and the troop concentration was dispersed in early 1797.

=== Irish Rebellion ===
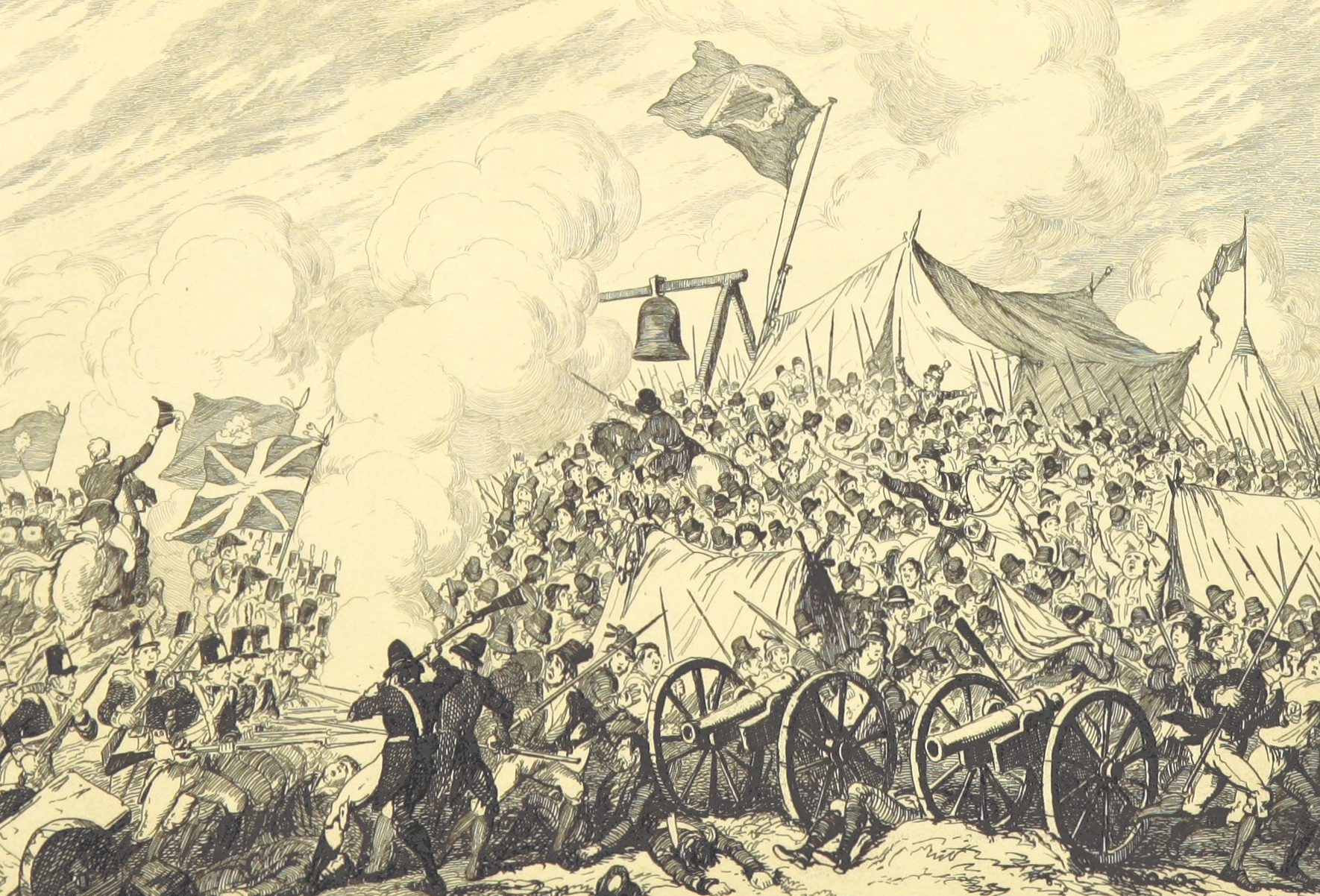
1845 engraving of the Battle of Vinegar Hill.

The expected Irish Rebellion finally broke out in May 1798. In mid-June government troops under Lieutenant-General Gerard Lake concentrated for an advance against the main rebel camp on Vinegar Hill, near Enniscorthy in County Wexford. On 20 June Major-General John Moore's column, including the militia light battalions, cleared Goff's Bridge (the Battle of Foulksmills) and Vinegar Hill was attacked at dawn on 21 June. Lake's columns came under fire from rebel skirmishers among the hedges, but they advanced steadily, converging on the hill and clearing the camp and the town of Enniscorthy. 1st Light Bn suffered a number of casualties in this action. The decisive defeat at the Battle of Vinegar Hill broke the Wexford Rebellion. Over the following weeks the remaining rebel groups in other part of Ireland were largely destroyed before a French force arrived on 22 August, too late to effect the outcome, and after initial success was forced to surrender on 8 September.

After the rebellion the Irish Militia settled down to garrison duty once more. With the diminishing threat of invasion after 1799, the strength of the militia could be reduced, and the surplus men were encouraged to volunteer for regiments of the line. The light battalions were reformed in 1800, with the Cork companies once more in 1st Light Bn. William Tonson, 2nd Lord Riversdale of Rathcormac became Lieutenant-Colonel of the regiment on 30 May 1801.

By the end of 1801 peace negotiations with the French were progressing, so recruiting and re-enlistment for the Irish Militia was stopped in October. The men received the new clothing they were due on 25 December, but the Treaty of Amiens was signed in March 1802 after which the militia regiments were disembodied leaving only the permanent staff of non-commissioned officers (NCOs) and drummers under the regimental adjutant.

=== Napoleonic Wars ===
However, the Peace of Amiens was short-lived and preparations to re-embody the militia begun in November 1802. Early in 1803 the regiments were ordered to begin re-enrolling former militiamen and new volunteers as well as using the ballot. The proclamation to embody the militia was issued on 15 March and carried out on 25 March.

Anti-invasion preparations were now put in hand and the reconstituted militia regiments underwent training, although most were not considered well enough trained to go into camp during the summer of 1804. The light battalions were reformed in September 1803 but were discontinued in 1806. Over the following years the regiments carried out garrison duties at various towns across Ireland and attended summer training camps. As the war progressed, the Regular Army increasingly relied on volunteers from the militia for trained recruits. In 1805 the militia establishment was raised to allow for this.

The Interchange Act 1811 passed in July allowed Irish militia regiments to serve in England and vice versa for up to two years. The South Cork was one of the regiments that volunteered and was selected. It served in England from June 1812 to October 1814.

The Napoleonic Wars were brought to an end by the Battle of Waterloo in 1815, and the regiment was finally disembodied in 1816.

== South Cork Light Infantry ==
After Waterloo there was a long peace. Although ballots were still held until they were suspended by the Militia Act 1829, the regiments were rarely assembled for training. The permanent staffs of sergeants and drummers (who were occasionally used to maintain public order) were progressively reduced, though the statutory establishment of the disembodied regiment was still eight companies. Officers continued to be commissioned sporadically. The regiment was redesignated the South Cork Militia (Light Infantry) (LI) at some time before 1840 when the colonel was Lord Riversdale. In 1845–46 there was an effort to replace elderly members of the permanent staff and to appoint a few younger officers from the county gentry, though they had no duties to perform. Lord Riversdale died in 1848 and was succeeded as colonel by Hayes St Leger, 3rd Viscount Doneraile, son of the regiment's first colonel. William St Leger Alcock Stawell of Kilbrittain Castle, formerly a Captain in the 23rd Foot was appointed Lt-Col on the same day.

The Militia of the United Kingdom was revived by the Militia Act 1852, enacted during a period of international tension. As before, units were raised and administered on a county basis, and filled by voluntary enlistment (although conscription by means of the Militia Ballot might be used if the counties failed to meet their quotas). Training was for 56 days on enlistment, then for 21–28 days per year, during which the men received full army pay. Under the Act, Militia units could be embodied by Royal Proclamation for full-time home defence 'in case of national danger or pressing necessity'.

The South Cork LI was revived in 1852. Viscount Doneraile died on 27 March 1854 and was succeeded as colonel by the Hon Henry Boyle Bernard of Coolmain Castle, younger son of the 2nd Earl of Bandon and later Member of Parliament (MP) for Bandon. Lieutenant-Col Stawell transferred to the North Cork Rifles on 8 November 1854, and Henry Wallis of Drisbane Castle was promoted in his place.

=== Crimean War ===
The Crimean War having broken out and a large expeditionary force sent overseas, the militia were called out for home defence. The South Cork LI were embodied for service and by March 1855 were stationed at Bandon. They moved to Kinsale during April, to Cork City by August and by the beginning of December the regiment was at Dublin, where it remained until it was disembodied at the end of the war in 1856.

The South Cork LI was not among the militia regiments embodied for home defence when an expeditionary force was sent to suppress the Indian Mutiny. In the late 1850s Regimental HQ moved to Bandon. Lieutenant-ColWallis died on 6 January 1862 and was replaced by Edmond Roche, an unattached colonel, and then Sir Augustus Warren, 5th Baronet, a former Major in the 20th Foot who had served in the Crimea and Indian Mutiny, was appointed Lt-Col on 6 July 1865.

Over the following years the militia were mustered each year for 21 or 28 days' training, although there was no training for the Irish Militia from 1866 to 1870 at the time of the Fenian crisis. Militia battalions now had a large cadre of permanent staff (about 30) and a number of the officers were former Regulars. Around a third of the recruits and many young officers went on to join the Regular Army. The Militia Reserve introduced in 1867 consisted of present and former militiamen who undertook to serve overseas in case of war. Some of these were called out in 1878 during the Balkan Crisis.

=== Cardwell Reforms ===
Under the 'Localisation of the Forces' scheme introduced by the Cardwell Reforms of 1872, infantry militia regiments were brigaded with their local linked regular regiments. For the Cork Militia this was in Sub-District No 70 (Counties of Kerry, Cork and Clare) in Cork District of Irish Command:

- 101st Regiment of Foot (Royal Bengal Fusiliers)
- 104th Regiment of Foot (Bengal Fusiliers)
- South Cork Light Infantry at Bandon
- Clare Militia at Ennis
- Kerry Militia at Tralee
- North Cork Rifles at Mallow
- Royal Limerick County Militia at Limerick
- No 70 Brigade Depot was formed at Tralee

Although often referred to as brigades, the sub-districts were purely administrative organisations, but in a continuation of the Cardwell Reforms a mobilisation scheme began to appear in the Army List from December 1875. This assigned Regular and Militia units to places in an order of battle of corps, divisions and brigades for the 'Active Army', even though these formations were entirely theoretical, with no staff or services assigned. The South Cork LI were assigned to 2nd Brigade of 3rd Division, II Corps. The brigade, consisting of the North and South Cork and the Galway Militia, would have mustered at Horsham in Sussex in time of war.

== 3rd Royal Munster Fusiliers ==
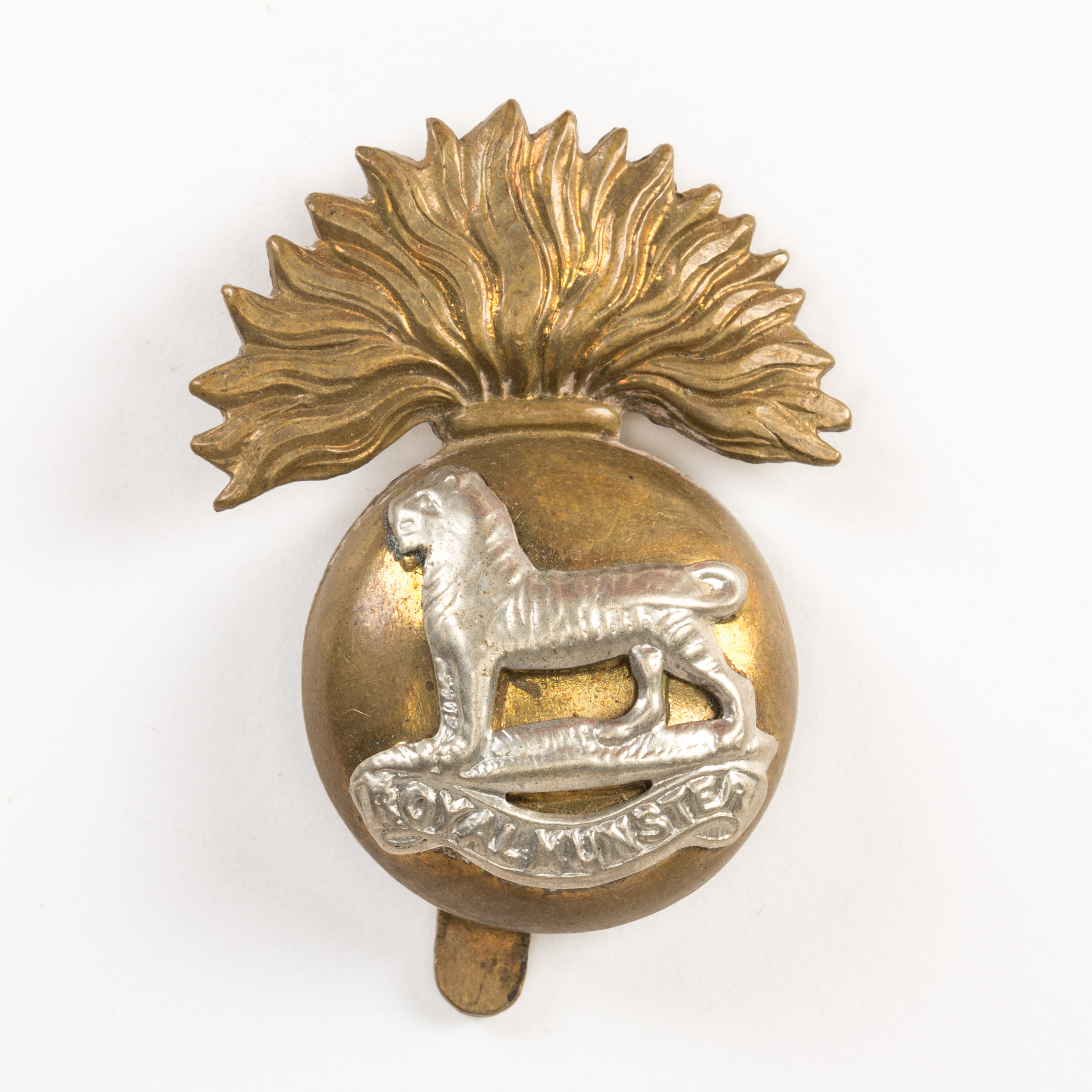
Cap badge of the Royal Munster Fusiliers.

The Childers Reforms took Cardwell's reforms further, with the militia regiments becoming numbered battalions of their linked regiments. On 1 July 1881 the 101st and 104th Regiments became the 1st and 2nd Battalions of the Royal Munster Fusiliers (RMF), and the South Cork Light Infantry Militia became the 4th Battalion. However, in a change of policy, the Clare Militia was instead converted to artillery the following year and the South Corks were redesignated the 3rd (South Cork Militia) Battalion, Royal Munster Fusiliers.

In the early 1890s the battalion headquarters moved to Kinsale.

=== Second Boer War ===
With the bulk of the Regular Army (reinforced by the Militia Reserve) serving in South Africa during the Second Boer War, the Militia were called out for home defence. The 3rd Bn RMF was embodied from 5 December 1899 and volunteered for overseas service. It embarked for South Africa with a strength of 24 officers and 416 other ranks under the command of Col F.W. Bell. It arrived in February 1900 and was stationed in garrisons at Stormberg, Aliwal North, Vryburg, Mafeking, and Orange River. The battalion also went 'on trek' with Sir Henry Settle's column (known humorously as 'Settle's Imperial circus') in the Western Transvaal during the Second De Wet Hunt. Afterwards the 3rd Bn was stationed at Orange River, occupying the chain of blockhouses along the railway towards Kimberley. After one of the longest deployments of any of the militia battalions, 3rd RMF re-embarked for home in March 1902, shortly before hostilities were ended by the Treaty of Vereeniging. It was disembodied on 31 March 1902.

During its deployment the battalion lost one officer and five other ranks killed or died of disease. The participants received the Queen's South Africa Medal with clasps for 'Cape Colony', 'Orange Free State', and 'Transvaal' and the King's South Africa Medal with the clasps 'South Africa 1901' and 'South Africa 1902'. The battalion was awarded the Battle honour South Africa 1900–02.

== Special Reserve ==
After the Boer War, the future of the militia was called into question. There were moves to reform the Auxiliary Forces (Militia, Yeomanry and Volunteers) to take their place in the six Army Corps proposed by the Secretary of State for War, St John Brodrick. However, little of Brodrick's scheme was carried out. Under the more sweeping Haldane Reforms of 1908, the Militia was replaced by the Special Reserve (SR), a semi-professional force whose role was to provide reinforcement drafts for regular units serving overseas in wartime, rather like the earlier Militia Reserve. The 3rd (South Cork Militia) Bn became the 4th (Extra Reserve) Bn, Royal Munster Fusiliers, on 2 August 1908.

=== World War I ===
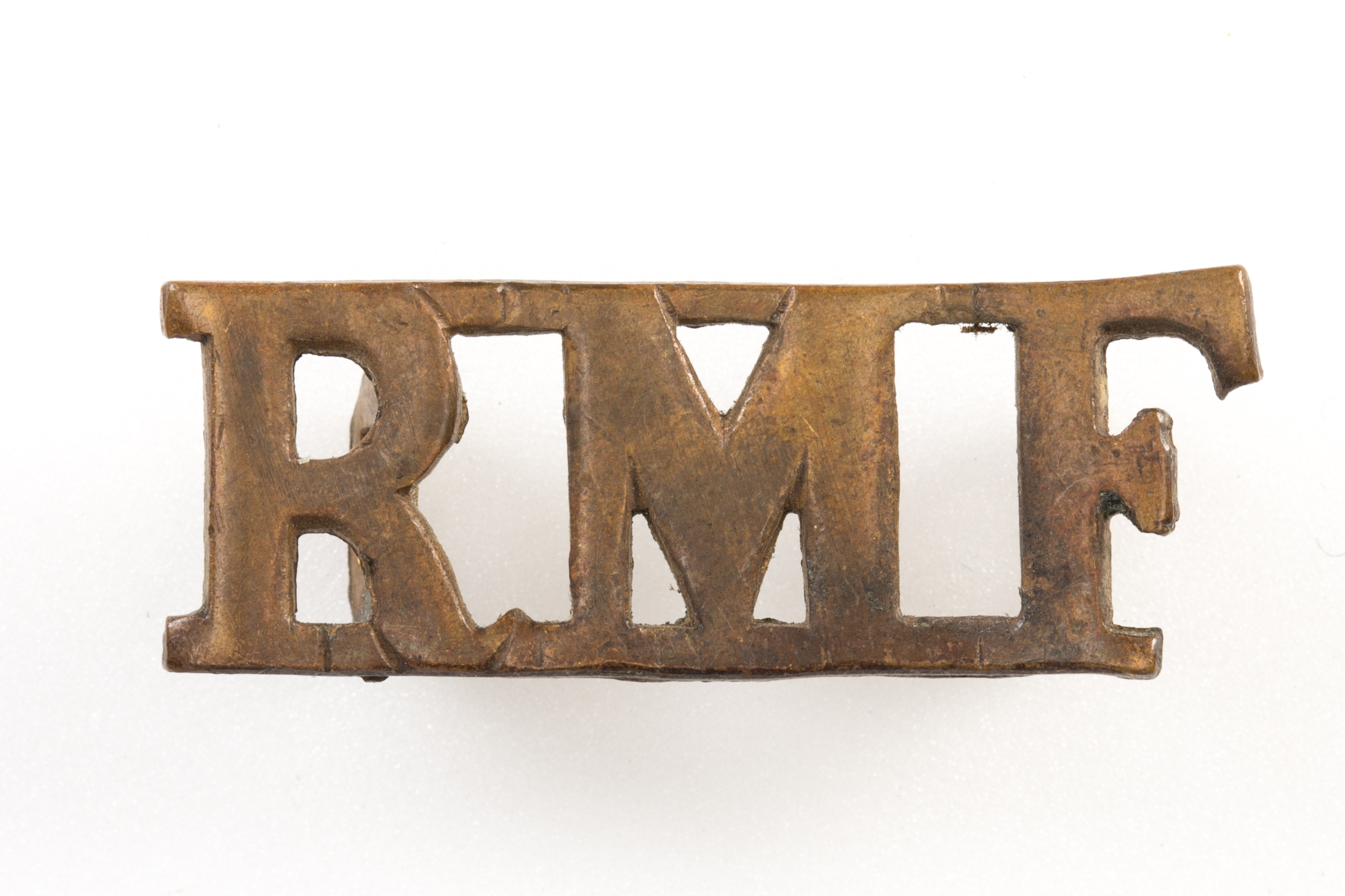
Shoulder title of the Royal Munster Fusiliers.

On the outbreak of World War I on 4 August 1914 the battalion, commanded by Lt-Col G.W.C. Soden, mobilised at Kinsale, and took up its war station in the defences at Queenstown. The SR battalions had the dual roles of coast defence and preparing drafts of reinforcements (reservists, special reservists, and new recruits) for the Regular battalions overseas (the 2nd Bn of the Munsters was serving on the Western Front and after the 1st Bn returned from the Far East it served in the Gallipoli campaign). On 8 October the SR battalions were ordered to form service battalions from their surplus recruits, and 4th (Extra Reserve) Bn should have formed an 11th (Service) Battalion of the Munsters. However this order was cancelled for most Irish regiments and Extra Reserve battalions on 25 October and no 11th Bn was ever formed.

In November 1914 the 4th (ER) Bn moved to Aghada on the east side of Cork Harbour. In May 1915 it moved to the Tyne Defences at South Shields in England, but was back in Ireland by September, when it was stationed at Fermoy. In February 1916 it was on Bere Island in Bantry Bay, then by April 1917 it was at Curragh Camp outside Dublin. In August 1917 it as at Castlebar, County Mayo. About November it moved to Dreghorn (probably Dreghorn Barracks) in Scotland, and by April 1918 it was at Portobello, Edinburgh.

Following the Easter Rising in 1916, voluntary recruitment in Ireland had dwindled away, and the Government was not prepared to impose conscription in the island. In May 1918 the 4th (ER) Bn was absorbed into the 3rd (Reserve) Bn in garrison at Plymouth in England, and appears to have been officially disembodied on 4 June. As with other regiments based in southern Ireland, the reserve battalions were disbanded with the rest of the Royal Munster Fusiliers on 31 July 1922 after Irish Independence.

== Heritage & ceremonial ==
=== Uniforms ===
When the Irish militia was established in 1793 it was uniformed in the same red coats as the Line infantry. In the mid-19th Century the South Cork LI wore this with white facings, but when it became a battalion of the RMF it adopted that regiment's blue facings appropriate to a Royal regiment and adopted its badges and insignia.

=== Precedence ===
The South Cork Militia ranked 32nd in the list of Irish Militia regiments in 1794 and 1798.

The lists of militia precedence established during the Napoleonic Wars continued until 1833, when King William IV drew lots for a new list for the whole of the United Kingdom. The first 69 places went to regiments raised before the peace of 1783. The next 60 consisted of those raised during the French Revolutionary War, including all the Irish regiments. South Cork received the 87th place, which it retained when the list was revised for the last time in 1855.

=== Commanders ===
Commanding officers of the South Cork Militia and its successors included the following:

Colonels

- Hayes St Leger, 2nd Viscount Doneraile, appointed 25 April 1793, died 8 November 1819
- Hayes St Leger, 3rd Viscount Doneraile, appointed 18 April 1848, died 27 March 1854
- Hon Henry Boyle Bernard, MP, appointed 29 March 1854, appointed Hon Col 5 July 1876x

'Honorary Colonels

- Hon Henry Boyle Bernard, former Col, appointed 5 July 1876, died 14 March 1895
- Sir Augustus Riversdale Warren, 5th Baronet, former CO, appointed 28 August 1895
- Col Morgan William II O'Donovan, 'The O'Donovan', former CO, appointed 17 June 1914

Lieutenant-colonels (Commanding officers after 1876)

- William Tonson, 2nd Lord Riversdale, appointed 30 May 1801, died 1848
- William St Leger Alcock Stawell of Kilbrittain Castle, formerly 23rd Foot, appointed 18 April 1848, transferred to North Cork Rifles 8 November 1854
- Henry Wallis of Drisbane Castle promoted 19 January 1855, died 6 January 1862
- Edmund Roche, unattached colonel, appointed 20 August 1863
- Sir Augustus Warren, 5th Baronet, former major 20th Foot, appointed 6 July 1865, became Hon Col 28 August 1895
- Frederick Bell, promoted 13 November 1895
- The O'Donovan, promoted 17 January 1903, became Hon Col 17 June 1914
- G.W.C. Soden, appointed 17 January 1914

=== Battle Honour ===
The battalion 's battle honour South Africa 1900–02 was subsumed into the RMF's South Africa 1899–1902 in 1910 when it was ordered that SR battalions would carry the same honours as their parent regiments.
