= John St Leger (1674–1743) =

Irish barrister, politician and judge

Sir John St Leger (1674–1743) was an Irish barrister, politician and judge. He belonged to a prominent aristocratic family from County Cork. He was not highly regarded for his legal ability, and it was believed by his contemporaries that he owed his professional success to his influential family connections. As a judge, he is mainly remembered for hearing, with two of his colleagues, the celebrated case of Sherlock v. Annesley, which caused a major Constitutional crisis, and led to the three judges being briefly imprisoned for contempt of Parliament.

== Background and early career ==
He was born at Doneraile, County Cork, elder son of John St Leger (died 1695) by his second wife Aphra, only daughter and heiress of Thomas Harflete of Ash, Frapham and Chilton in Kent. His elder half-brother was Arthur St Leger, 1st Viscount Doneraile. Arthur's loyalty to his younger brother was evident throughout his life: he lobbied for John's appointment to the Bench in 1714 and was one of the very few peers to speak against a motion to commit him for contempt of the Irish House of Lords in 1719.

John was educated at Westminster School and Christ Church, Oxford. He entered the Inner Temple in 1691, but was not called to the Bar until 1707. Even then he was notably dilatory in practising his profession (he chose to practice in England in the early years), prompting a famous jibe by Jonathan Swift that St Leger did not so much practice at the Bar as follow it at a distance. He became attached to the English Court in a minor capacity, and was something of a royal favourite of King William III, who gave him a knighthood in 1701.

== Judge ==
He returned to Ireland and was nominated as Recorder of Cashel, but the appointment was vetoed by the Crown, possibly on the grounds of his Whig leanings, at a time when political differences in Ireland were exceptionally bitter. He sat in the Irish House of Commons as member for Doneraile, which was the St Leger family borough. On the accession of King George I in 1714, there was a "clean sweep" of the existing Tory judges, who were dismissed en bloc. St Leger was a Whig in politics, and this, together with the support of influential friends and of his brother Lord Doneraile, was apparently considered sufficient grounds to qualify him for appointment to the Bench. He became a Baron of the Court of Exchequer (Ireland). The appointment was greeted with general derision by those who knew him well: "God help the country where St Leger is made a judge!" remarked the poet Samuel Garth.

=== State of the Irish Court of Exchequer in 1714 ===
In fairness to him, it must be said that St Leger and his colleagues faced a daunting task: he himself described the state of the Irish Court of Exchequer as one of "confusion and disorder, almost past remedy". An enormous backlog of cases had built up, Court procedures were obscure, and hearings often extended over more than a year. The appointment of Sir Jeffrey Gilbert as Chief Baron of the Irish Exchequer improved matters for a time: he was a fine lawyer, who after his death gained great fame for his legal treatises, and he was initially very popular in Ireland.

=== Sherlock v Annesley ===
Quite unexpectedly a routine lawsuit, Sherlock v Annesley, involving a dispute between two cousins over the right to possession of certain lands at Naas, County Kildare, which was heard in the Court of Exchequer by Gilbert, St Leger and their colleague John Pocklington, created a major constitutional crisis. In Pocklington's words, the case caused "a flame to burst forth, and the last resentment of the country fell upon us (i.e. the Barons)". At that time the Irish House of Lords and the British House of Lords each claimed to be the final court of appeal from Ireland, and each House heard an appeal from one of the parties to the suit, resulting in contradictory orders. The Barons of the Exchequer, to the fury of the Irish House of Lords, felt obliged to enforce the English House of Lord's order, and were summoned to account for their actions before the Lords. After a short and ill-tempered hearing, the House ordered Black Rod to take the Barons into custody; St Leger's brother Lord Doneraile was one of the very few peers to object to the sentence. Gilbert and Pocklington were in custody for three months, but St Leger was released early, as he was required to give evidence in a case at the assizes in Cork.

== Later years ==
In the bitter aftermath of the crisis, which resulted in the Declaratory Act 1719 (the infamous "sixth of George I"), by which the Irish House of Lords lost its status as a court of appeal (a status which was not restored until 1782), Chief Baron Gilbert chose to return to England. St Leger, despite the damage to his reputation, lobbied hard for promotion in his home country. Public opinion for some years was divided as to whether he would become Irish Chief Baron or be dismissed from the Bench altogether. In fact, he simply remained in his position as junior Baron until his retirement in 1741. He is listed as a trustee of the King's Inns in 1731. In 1725 he and Gilbert's successor as Chief Baron, Bernard Hale, narrowly escaped death or serious injury when on assize at Monaghan: the courthouse, like most Irish courthouses of the time, was in a serious state of disrepair, and the roof fell in. The judges, unhurt, concluded the assizes in the open air.

He lived at Capel Street in Dublin and at Grangemellon in County Kildare, where he died and was buried in 1743.

== Family ==
While he was still in his twenties, he made an advantageous marriage to a wealthy widow, Mary Ware Fraser, who was the daughter of Sir James Ware junior and granddaughter of the noted historian Sir James Ware. Mary, who had previously been married to Alexander Fraser, was some twenty-five years his senior, and according to Francis Elrington Ball there was much gossip about her "questionable virtue". She died in 1722, aged about seventy.

Her widower quickly remarried Lavinia Pennefather, daughter of Kingsmill Pennefather and Elizabeth Bolton; Lavinia belonged to the prominent landowning family of New Hill, County Tipperary. They had eight children: John, the eldest son and heir, Arthur, William, Major-General Anthony St Leger, founder of the St Leger Stakes, Catherine, Lavinia, who married George Clarges, Elizabeth, who married Ralph Burton, and the leading soldier General Barry St. Leger (1733–1789), best known for his participation in the Saratoga campaign.

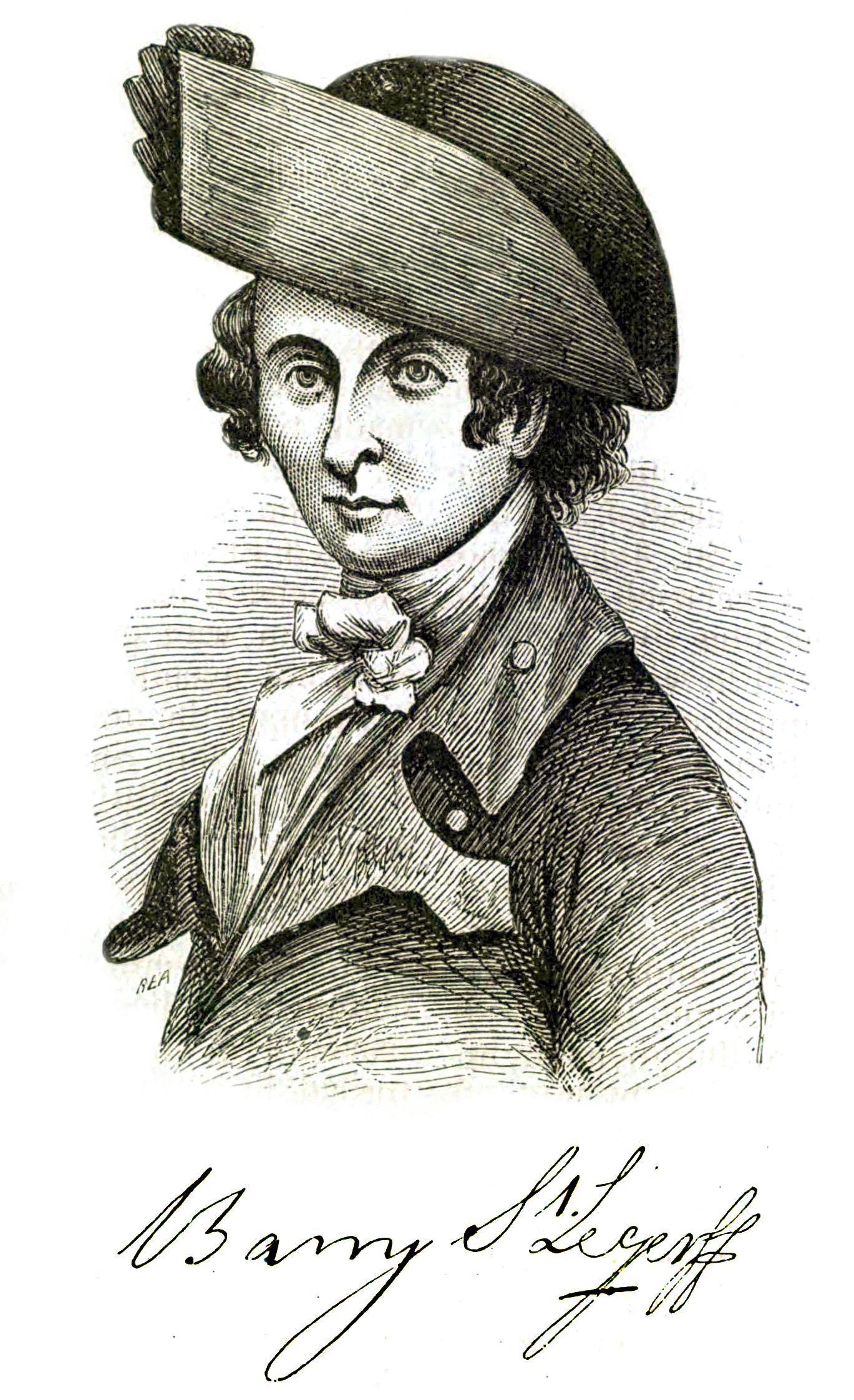
Barry St. Leger, son of John and Lavinia St Leger

== See also ==
- Dependency of Ireland on Great Britain Act 1719
