= Viscount Doneraile =

Title in the peerage of Ireland

Viscount Doneraile 2nd Creation
- Arms of St Leger: Azure fretty argent, a chief or
- Creation date: 22 June 1785
- Creation: Second
- Created by: George III
- Peerage: Peerage of Ireland
- First holder: St Leger St Leger, 1st Viscount Doneraile
- Present holder: Richard St Leger, 10th Viscount Doneraile
- Heir apparent: The Hon. Nathaniel St Leger
- Subsidiary titles: Baron Doneraile
- Motto: HAUT ET BON (French for "Great and good")

Viscount Doneraile 1st Creation
- Creation date: 23 June 1703
- Creation: First
- Created by: Queen Anne
- Peerage: Peerage of Ireland
- First holder: Arthur St Leger, 1st Viscount Doneraile
- Last holder: Hayes St Leger, 4th Viscount Doneraile
- Remainder to: The 1st Viscount’s heirs male of the body lawfully begotten
- Subsidiary titles: Baron Kilmayden
- Extinction date: 25 April 1767
- Same arms as the 2nd creation

Viscount Doneraile (/ˈdʌnərəl/) is a title that has been created twice in the Peerage of Ireland, both times for members of the St Leger family.

It was first created in 1703 for Arthur St Leger, along with the subsidiary title of Baron Kilmayden, also in the Peerage of Ireland. This creation became extinct in 1767 upon the death of the fourth Viscount. His daughter, Elizabeth, had a son named St Leger Aldworth, who succeeded to the Doneraile estates and assumed the surname of St Leger in lieu of his patronymic. He notably represented Doneraile in the Irish Parliament from 1749 to 1776. The latter year, he was raised to the Peerage of Ireland as Baron Doneraile. In 1785, the viscountcy was revived and he was created Viscount Doneraile, also in the Peerage of Ireland.

His grandson, the third Viscount, sat in the House of Lords as an Irish representative peer from 1830 to 1854. His son, the fourth Viscount, was an Irish Representative Peer between 1855 and 1887. He was succeeded by his second cousin, the fifth Viscount. His son, the sixth Viscount, served as Mayor of the City of Westminster.

On the death of his younger brother, the seventh Viscount, this line of the family failed, and he was succeeded by his second cousin once removed, the eighth Viscount. As of 2014, the titles are held by the latter's grandson, the tenth Viscount, who succeeded his father in 1983. He lives in California.

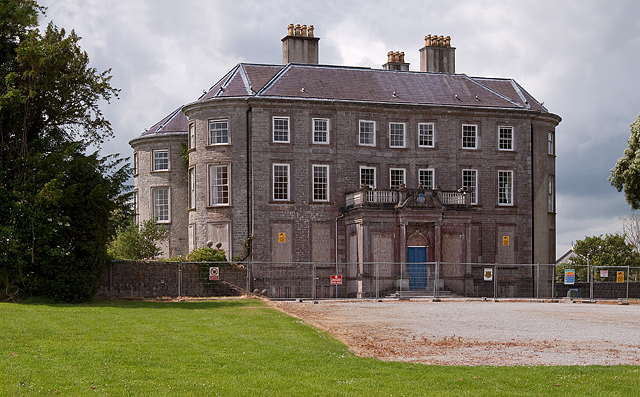
Doneraile Court, County Cork

The family seat was Doneraile Court, near Mallow, County Cork.

== Viscounts Doneraile, First Creation (1703) ==
- Arthur St Leger, 1st Viscount Doneraile (died 1727)
- Arthur St Leger, 2nd Viscount Doneraile (1694–1734)
- Arthur Mohun St Leger, 3rd Viscount Doneraile (1718–1750)
- Hayes St Leger, 4th Viscount Doneraile (1702–1767)

== Viscounts Doneraile, Second Creation (1785) ==
- St Leger St Leger, 1st Viscount Doneraile (died 1787)
- Hayes St Leger, 2nd Viscount Doneraile (1755–1819)
- Hayes St Leger, 3rd Viscount Doneraile (1786–1854)
- Hayes St Leger, 4th Viscount Doneraile (1818–1887)
- Richard Arthur St Leger, 5th Viscount Doneraile (1825–1891)
- Edward St Leger, 6th Viscount Doneraile (1866–1941)
- Hugh St Leger, 7th Viscount Doneraile (1869–1956)
- Algernon Edward St Leger, 8th Viscount Doneraile (1878–1957)
- Richard St John St Leger, 9th Viscount Doneraile (1923–1983)
- Richard Allen St Leger, 10th Viscount Doneraile (1946–2015)

The heir apparent is the Hon. Nathaniel Warham Robert St John St Leger (born 1971).
