= Bartholomew Purdon =

Irish politician (died 1737)

Bartholomew Purdon (c. 1675–1737) was a County Cork landowner and a long-serving member of the Irish House of Commons. He was also a Justice of the Peace and served as Deputy Lord Lieutenant of County Cork for many years. He was High Sheriff of County Cork in 1708–9.

He was born at Ballyclogh, County Cork, the son of Caption Bartholomew Purdon senior and his wife Alicia Jephson, daughter of Major-General William Jephson of Mallow Castle, County Cork and Alicia Dynham of Boarstall Tower, Buckinghamshire. He had at least one sister Alicia, who married Colonel Thomas Phayre of Mountpleasant, a younger son of the regicide Colonel Robert Phayre. His paternal grandfather Sir Nicholas Purdon (died 1678) founded the Ballyclogh branch of the prominent Purdon family of County Clare, who were of English origin, and who settled in Ireland in the sixteenth century. He sat in the Irish House of Commons as MP for Baltimore 1651-6. Sir Nicholas's wife was Alice or Ellis Stephens, daughter of Henry Stephens of County Cork. The barrister and politician Henry Purdon (died 1737), only son of Adam Purdon, was Bartholomew's first cousin.Ballyclogh Tower House, the family home, was burnt in the 1690s, and not rebuilt till much later. It is now a ruin.

Bartholomew's father fought on the Williamite side during the Williamite War in Ireland:he was captured by Government forces at Loughrea in late 1688, and imprisoned at Galway. He had surrendered on promise of mercy, and though sentenced to death for treason he was reprieved. He died soon afterwards, still under confinement at Galway.

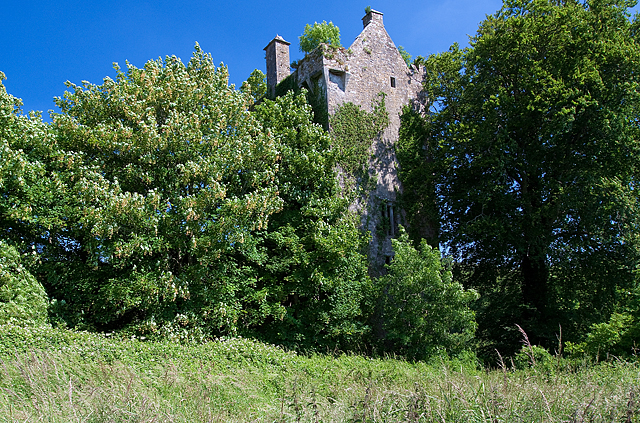
Ballyclogh Tower House

Bartholomew junior was MP for Mallow 1703–1713; for Doneraile 1713–14; and for Castlemartyr from 1715 to 1727, and again from 1727 until his death in 1737.

He married in 1699 Anne Coote, daughter of Colonel Chidley Coote and his wife Catherine Sandys. They were distant cousins, Anne being descended from Margaret Purdon, who married Thomas Jones, Archbishop of Dublin. The marriage provided a useful connection to the leading statesman Henry Boyle, 1st Earl of Shannon, who married Anne's sister Catherine. They had one daughter Anne, who married firstly in 1730 her cousin, Robert Coote (died 1745), son of the Reverend Chidley Coote and Jane Evans, (and brother of General Sir Eyre Coote), by whom she had six children. The best known of their children was their second son, the banker Bartholomew Coote-Purdon (1736–1780), who took his maternal grandfather's surname.Anne married secondly William Cole, sometime after 1745.

The inscription on Bartholomew's tomb, commissioned by his wife, described him as a man who in his thirty-nine years of public service "strictly observed justice, faithfully served his King and was a patriot to his country".

== Bibliography ==
- Alden, John Richard Stephen Sayre: American Revolutionary Adventurer: Louisiana State University Press 1983 pp. 33–4
- Burke's Peerage 2003 Edition Vol.1 p. 893
- Journal of the Cork Historical and Archaeological Society 1896 p.180
- William King, Archbishop of Dublin The State of the Protestants of Ireland under the late King James's Government 1692
- White, James Grove ed. (1901) Historical and Topographical notes etc. on Buttevant, Castletownroche, Doneraile, Mallow and places in their vicinity: Guy and Co, Cork
