= 95th Regiment of Foot (Burton's) =

- Active: 1761–1763
- Country: Kingdom of Great Britain
- Branch: British Army
- Type: Line Infantry
- Role: Infantry
- Size: One battalion
- Engagements: Anglo-Cherokee War; Seven Years' War

Commanders
- Colonel of the Regiment: Maj-Gen. Ralph Burton

The 95th Regiment of Foot (Burton's) was an infantry regiment of the British Army.

The regiment was formed 31 January 1761 in South Carolina during the Seven Years' War by Maj-Gen. Ralph Burton from a number of recently raised independent companies that had arrived from New York in November 1760. From nine companies of about 100 men each, Burton created a regiment consisting of ten companies each about 75 men strong. The regiment seems to have been in the field by May 1761, near Fort Prince George.

The soldiers wore scarlet uniforms faced with light gray, white buttons, and no lace.

The regiment fought successfully against the Cherokees in the Anglo-Cherokee War. It then transferred to Barbados. From there it participated in the capture of Martinique, the occupation of Grenada, and the 1762 Battle of Havana. The regiment was badly depleted. In October 1762, the regiment's privates were moved into other regiments stationed in Havana; its officers and NCOs were sent to England. The war having ended before new men could be recruited, the regiment was disbanded on 7 March 1763.

== Notable members ==
- Ralph Burton
- Robert Prescott, who later became governor general of Canada, served as a major in the regiment in 1761
