= Doneraile Court =

17th century house in County Cork, Ireland

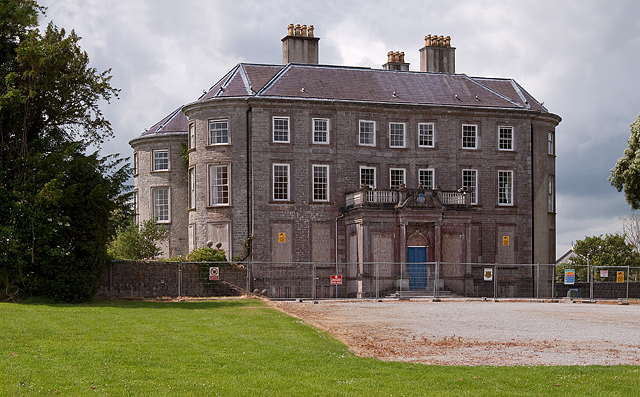
- North façade of the main house

- Location within Cork

General information
- Type: Country house
- Location: Doneraile, County Cork
- Coordinates: 52.21647°N 8.5824°W
- Construction started: 1640
- Completed: 1725-30

Design and construction
- Architects: John and Isaac Rothery
- Developer: Arthur St Leger, 1st Viscount Doneraile

Doneraile Court is a late-17th century country house near the town of Doneraile in County Cork, Ireland. It stands in 160 hectares (400 acres) of walled parkland known as Doneraile Park or Doneraile Estate. The house remained the seat of the St Leger family from the time of construction until the mid-20th century. The park, which is managed by the Office of Public Works (OPW), is open all year with free admission. As of 2023, Doneraile Park was the most visited free tourist attraction in County Cork, and the fifth most visited OPW site in the country.

== History ==
The estate, together with other lands, was purchased in 1629 by Sir William St. Leger, Lord President of Munster, who moved into the 13th-century Doneraile Castle. By 1645, the castle had been attacked and burned several times and was so badly damaged that it had to be abandoned.

Construction on the present house commenced in the 1640s, utilising some of the stonework of the old castle. It was extensively rebuilt and extended and the current facade added circa 1730 likely by the architects John (died 1736) and his son Isaac Rothery.

Various extensions and remodelling works were undertaken in the 19th century. For example, an octagonal kitchen and game store were built in 1869. A dining room (built at the same time) and a nine bay Gothic Revival style conservatory (built in 1825) have since been demolished. Other improvements within the estate included cottages, lodges, farm buildings and stables. The St. Leger family owned and bred horses for hunting and racing on the estate.

When Doneraile Court was the residence of Lord Castletown, Oliver Wendell Holmes Jr., who had been a soldier in the American Civil War, and became a lawyer and United States Supreme Court justice, carried on an extensive correspondence with Clare, Lady Castletown. He visited Doneraile on several occasions, and may have had an affair with her.

In 1870, the Doneraile demesne covered approximately 3,200 hectares (8,000 acres) in and around Doneraile, but was gradually reduced in size by the sale of land to tenants under the various Land Acts of the late 19th and early 20th centuries. The remaining demesne land, which now comprises Doneraile Wildlife Park, was sold to the government in 1943. Following the death of the then Viscount Doneraile, Hugh St Leger, 7th Viscount Doneraile, in 1956, the house and remaining lands were sold to the state's Land Commission.

The house and estate, which are open to the public, have been managed by the Office of Public Works since 1994. The house was renovated with input from the Irish Georgian Society.

The grounds in the vicinity of the house is laid out in the style of Capability Brown whilst the deer park contains Killarney Red, Sika and Fallow deer and the meadows a herd of Kerry cattle.

== See also ==
- List of tourist attractions in Ireland
