= John Baggot =

Irish Jacobite politician

John Baggot (1658–1718) was an Irish Jacobite politician.

Baggot was born in County Limerick, the son of James Bagot of Baggotstown and Celia Power, daughter of John Power. He was a counsellor at law. In c.1687 he married Ellinor Goold, the widow of Patrick Lavallin.

In 1689, Baggot was chosen as the Member of Parliament for Charleville in the short-lived Patriot Parliament summoned by James II of England in Dublin. During the Williamite War in Ireland, he was declared an outlaw by the Williamite English government and fled to France. There, he became a gentleman usher in the Stuart court at Château de Saint-Germain-en-Laye. He remained in exile in France for the rest of his life.

Parliament of Ireland
New constituency	Member of Parliament for Charleville; 1689; With: John Power	Succeeded by Henry Boreman; George Crofts
