= Arthur St Leger, 1st Viscount Doneraile =

Anglo-Irish politician and peer

Arthur St Leger, 1st Viscount Doneraile (died 7 July 1727) was an Anglo-Irish politician and peer.

== Biography ==
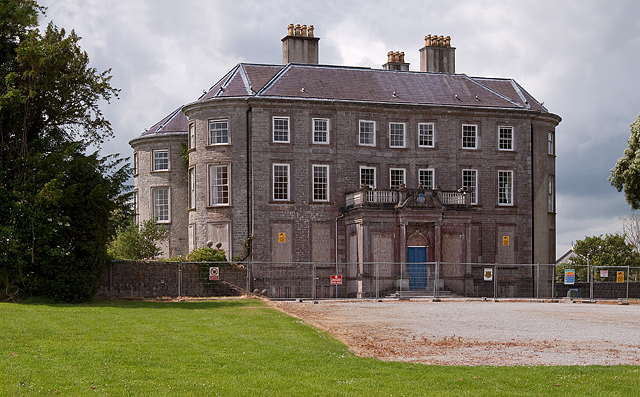
Doneraile Court - seat of the Viscounts Doneraile

St Leger was the son of John St. Leger and his first wife Lady Mary Chichester, the daughter of the 1st Earl of Donegall and his first wife, Dorcas Hill. He was a descendant of Sir Anthony St Leger. Sir John St Leger, Baron of the Court of Exchequer (Ireland), was his half-brother, the son of his father's second marriage to Aphra Harflete, an heiress from Ash in Kent. John, who was not highly regarded as a lawyer, was said to have owed his success largely to his brother's support, and the two were close throughout their lives.

St Leger represented Doneraile in the Irish House of Commons from 1692 to 1693. On 23 June 1703 he was raised to the Peerage of Ireland as Viscount Doneraile and Baron Kilmayden. In 1715, he was invested as a member of the Privy Council of Ireland.

His most noted contribution to public life was during the debate in the Irish House of Lords on the much-debated case of Sherlock v Annesley in 1719. The Barons of the Court of Exchequer, including Doneraile's brother John, had given effect to a decree of the British House of Lords, ignoring a contrary decree of the Irish House. The Irish peers, infuriated by this challenge to their authority, summoned the judges to appear before them and after a short, ill-tempered hearing committed them to prison for three months. The only peers to vote against committing the judges were Doneraile and the Lord Chancellor of Ireland, Lord Midleton. While the Lord Chancellor was concerned at the political implications of the Lords' conduct, warning rightly that the House was at risk of losing its judicial powers altogether, Doneraile seems to have been moved by simple family loyalty, as he and his brother were close.

He married Elizabeth Hayes, the daughter of John Hayes and Mehitabel Ottrington, on 24 June 1690. Elizabeth brought him substantial estates in County Waterford, which she inherited from her maternal grandfather. Together they had four children. Both of his two surviving sons would, in turn, succeed to his titles. A third son, John, was killed in a duel by the future judge Arthur Blennerhassett in 1741. His daughter Elizabeth Aldworth achieved fame as "The Lady Freemason", and was also the progenitor of the Viscounts Doneraile of the second creation.

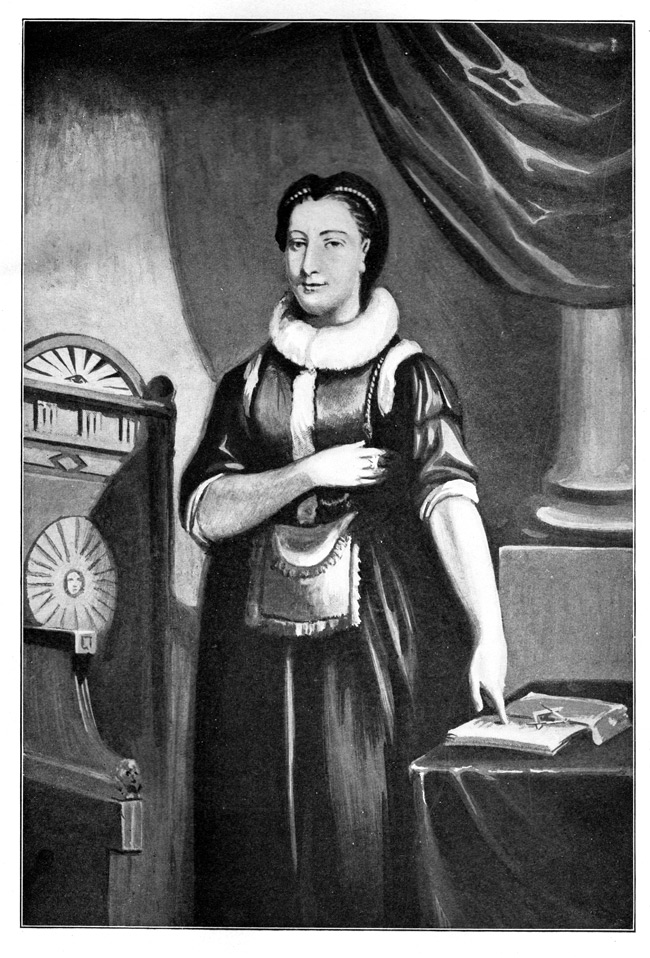
St Leger's daughter, Elizabeth Aldworth

Parliament of Ireland
Preceded by Daniel O'Donovan; John Baggot	Member of Parliament for Doneraile; 1692–1693; With: John St Leger	Succeeded by John Hayes; Edward Denny
Peerage of Ireland
New creation	Viscount Doneraile; 1st creation 1703–1727	Succeeded by Arthur St Leger
