= Patrick Augustine Sheehan =

Irish Roman Catholic priest and author

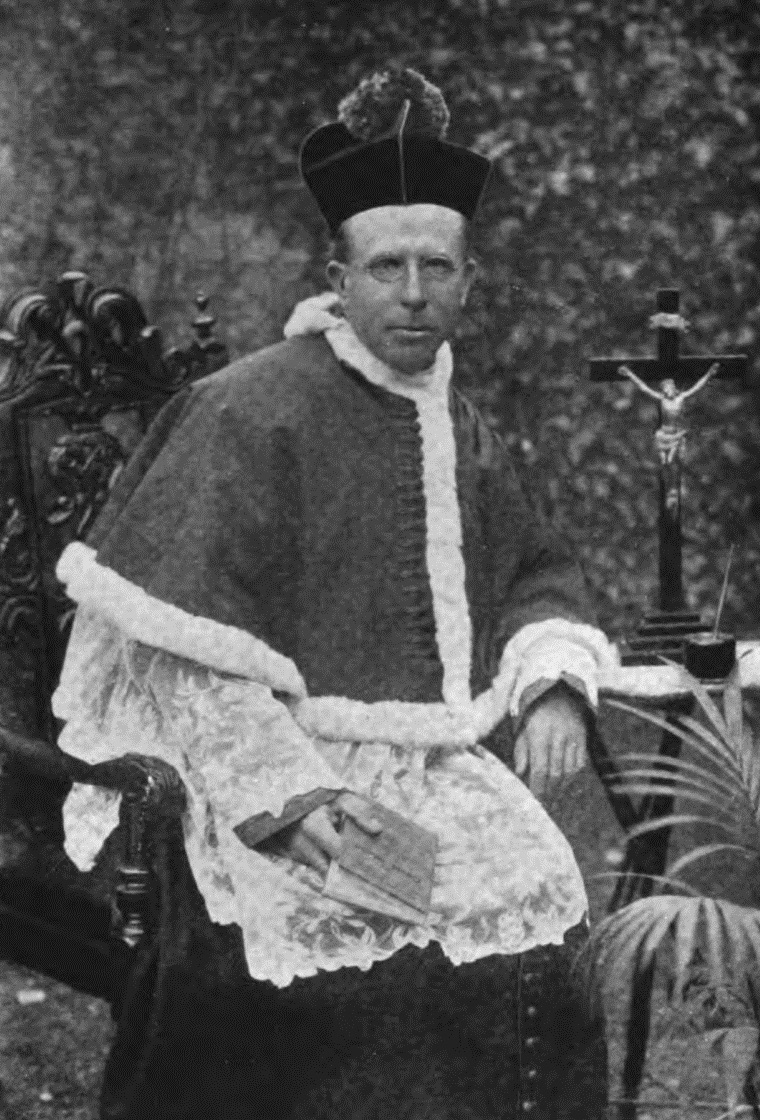
Canon Sheehan

Patrick Augustine Sheehan (17 March 1852 – 5 October 1913) was an Irish Catholic priest, author and political activist. He was usually known as Canon Sheehan after his 1903 appointment as a canon of the diocese of Cloyne, or more fully as Canon Sheehan of Doneraile, after the town of Doneraile where he wrote almost all of his major works and served as parish priest.

== Early life ==
Patrick Augustine Sheehan was born on St Patrick's Day, 1852, at 29 New Street in Mallow in the north of County Cork. Third eldest of five children born to Patrick Sheehan, owner of a small business, and to Joanna Regan, he was baptised by The Very Reverend Dr. John McCarthy, the sponsors being Timothy Cronin and Mary Ann Relehan.

As a child, Sheehan was fair-haired and delicate with "large wistful blue eyes". He was described as "a bit of a dreamer, and when other lads were shouting at play, he went alone to some copse or thicket, and with a book, or more often without one, would sit and think, and look dreamily at floating clouds or running stream; and then, with a sigh go back to his desk".

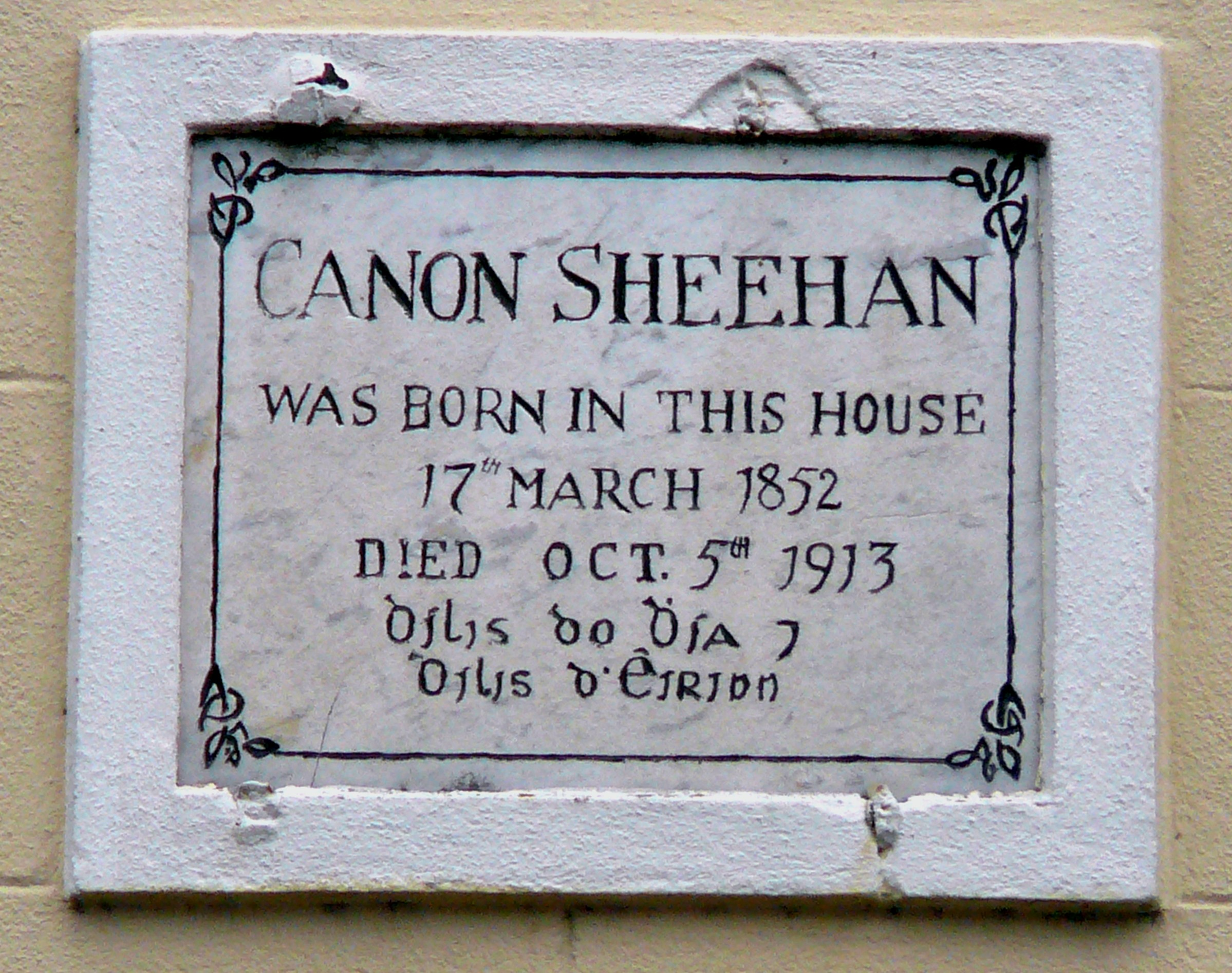
Birthplace plaques, now the William O'Brien Street, Mallow, Co Cork

Sheehan's father died on 13 July 1863 and his mother died on 6 February 1864. Following the loss of his parents, together with his three surviving siblings, he became the ward of the Parish Priest of Mallow, Dr. John McCarthy who later became Bishop of Cloyne. Responsibility for the Sheehan household devolved on his older sisters Hannah and Margaret.

When Sheehan and his brother Denis (1854–1941), who subsequently joined the Civil Service, had been despatched to secondary school, his sisters entered the Convent of Mercy in Mallow. Margaret Sheehan made religious profession, as Sr. Mary Augustine, on her death-bed before completion of her novitiate. She died on 7 November 1868.

Hannah Sheehan was professed as Sr. Mary Stanislaus, and became Mistress of Schools at Mallow Convent but died young on 17 December 1871. John, the youngest of the family, died at the age of five.

In his Under the Cedars and the Stars Sheehan wrote of his childhood: "Strange I never felt the proximity of father and mother. But of my sisters, one in particular, the only dark-haired in the family, has haunted me through life. I no more doubt of her presence and her light touch on the issues of my life, than I doubt of the breath of wind that flutters the tassel of the biretta on my head. Yet what is strange is not her nearness but her farness".

Early education was received in the Long Room National School in Mallow. Of the school master he later wrote: "His range of attainments was limited, but what he knew he knew well, and could impart it to his pupils. He did his duty conscientiously by constant, unremitting care, and he emphasized his teaching by frequent appeals to the ferule".

One of his classmates there was the journalist and parliamentarian, William O'Brien M.P., with whom he was to ally himself in later years. He completed secondary education in St Colman's College, Fermoy, at a time which coincided with the Fenian Rising, the events of which were to have a profound effect on him. He returned to the theme of violent insurrection in several of his novels, most notably The Graves at Kilmorna, recounting Fenian incidents witnessed by him while a student in Fermoy.

== Maynooth years ==
After St Colman's, he passed through "the sphinx-guarded gates", as he called them, of St. Patrick's College Maynooth College in County Kildare on 25 August 1869, to prepared for the priesthood. Although he never shone in the spartan Maynooth regime, he was a brilliant student who, despite recurring illness, succeeded in completing his studies a year before he was old enough to be ordained. Transferred by his guardian, Bishop John McCarthy of Cloyne, to the seminary of the Vincentian Fathers in Sundayswell in Cork, he was ordained to the priesthood in the Cathedral of St. Mary and St. Anne at Cork, on Sunday, 18 April 1875 by Bishop William Delany. It is believed that he celebrated his first Mass in the chapel of the Convent of Mercy in Mallow.

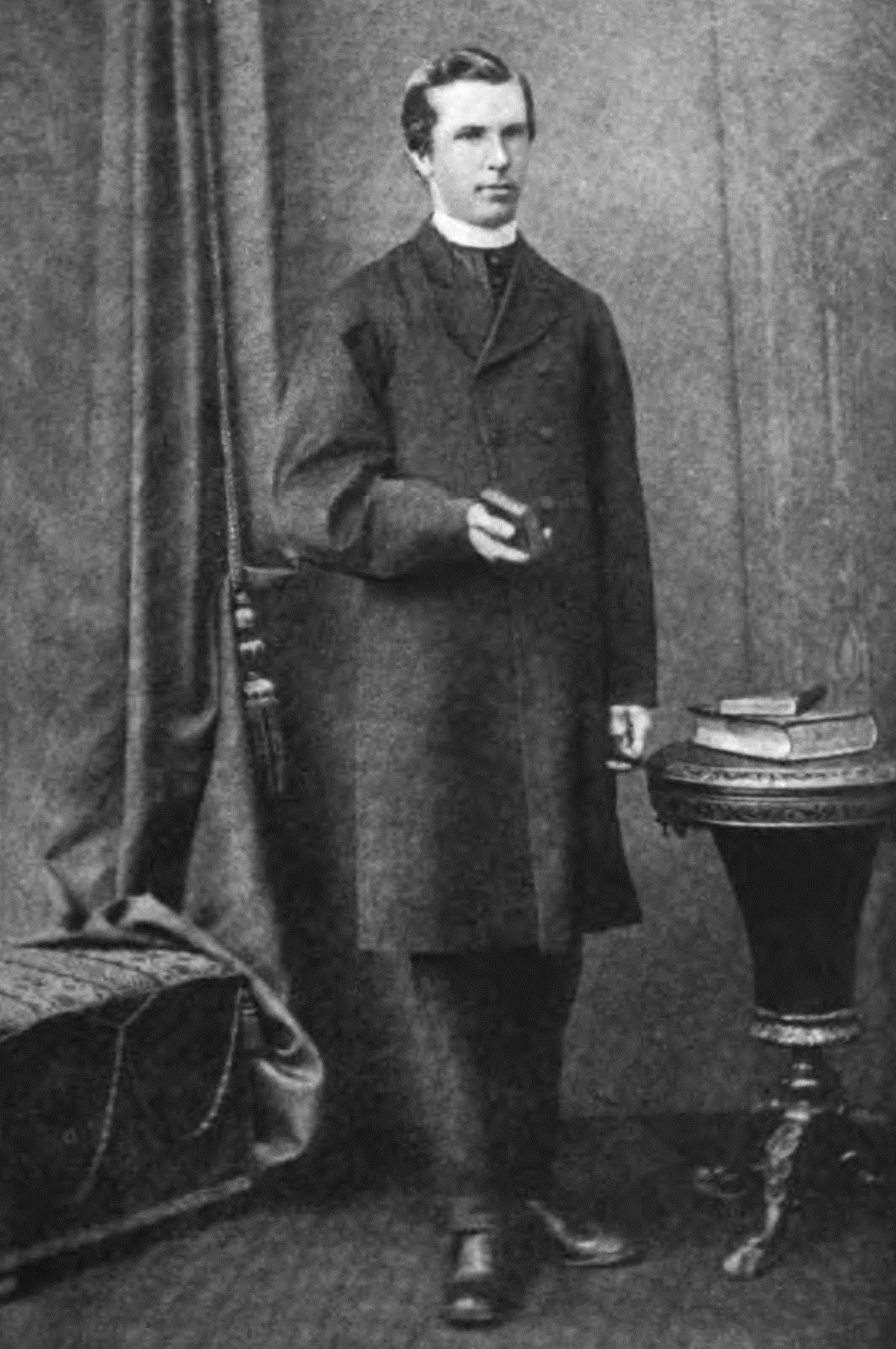
Sheehan, at the time of his ordination, 1875

In his essay "The Irish Priesthood and Politics" Sheehan gives a succinct description of his time in Maynooth: "I remember well that the impression made upon me by Maynooth College then, and afterwards, when I saw its long, stone corridors, its immense bare stony halls, the huge massive tables etc., was one of rude Cyclopean strength, without one single aspect or feature of refinement. So too with its studies. Rentless logic, with its formidable chevaux-de-frise of syllogisms, propositions, scholia; Metaphysics, sublime, but hardened into slabs of theories, congealed in medieval Latin; Physics, embracing a course that would have appalled a young Newton or Kepler; and then the vast shadow of four years' Divinity towering above and over-shadowing all!". The Maynooth literature course was hardly any better: "The Graces were nowhere! Even in the English literature or Belles-Lettres class, as it was called, the course seemed to be limited to hard grinding Grammar, and nothing more. During the first semestre, a few lectures were given on literature. All I can ever remember of that period were the words 'Lake Poets', which the good professor was forever repeating".

In January 1870, Fr. O'Rourke, the Professor of French and English, whom Sheehan describes as a "very gentle, polished man", was obliged to leave the college and go abroad for health reasons. He was replaced by Fr. James J. Murphy (1841–1875), a young priest of the archdiocese of Dublin, who was then just finishing his postgraduate research on the Dunboyne Establishment. Sheehan regarded him as "one of the most remarkable, if not one of the most distinguished, students that ever passed through Maynooth". To the "young hero-worshippers, sick and tired of logic-chopping, and the awful dullness of the morning classes, he came as a herald of light and leading".

Swiftly, he opened to their "wondering eyes the vast treasures of European and, particularly, of English literature". It was at his feet that Sheehan first heard the names of Carlyle, Tennyson, and Browning.

== Priesthood ==
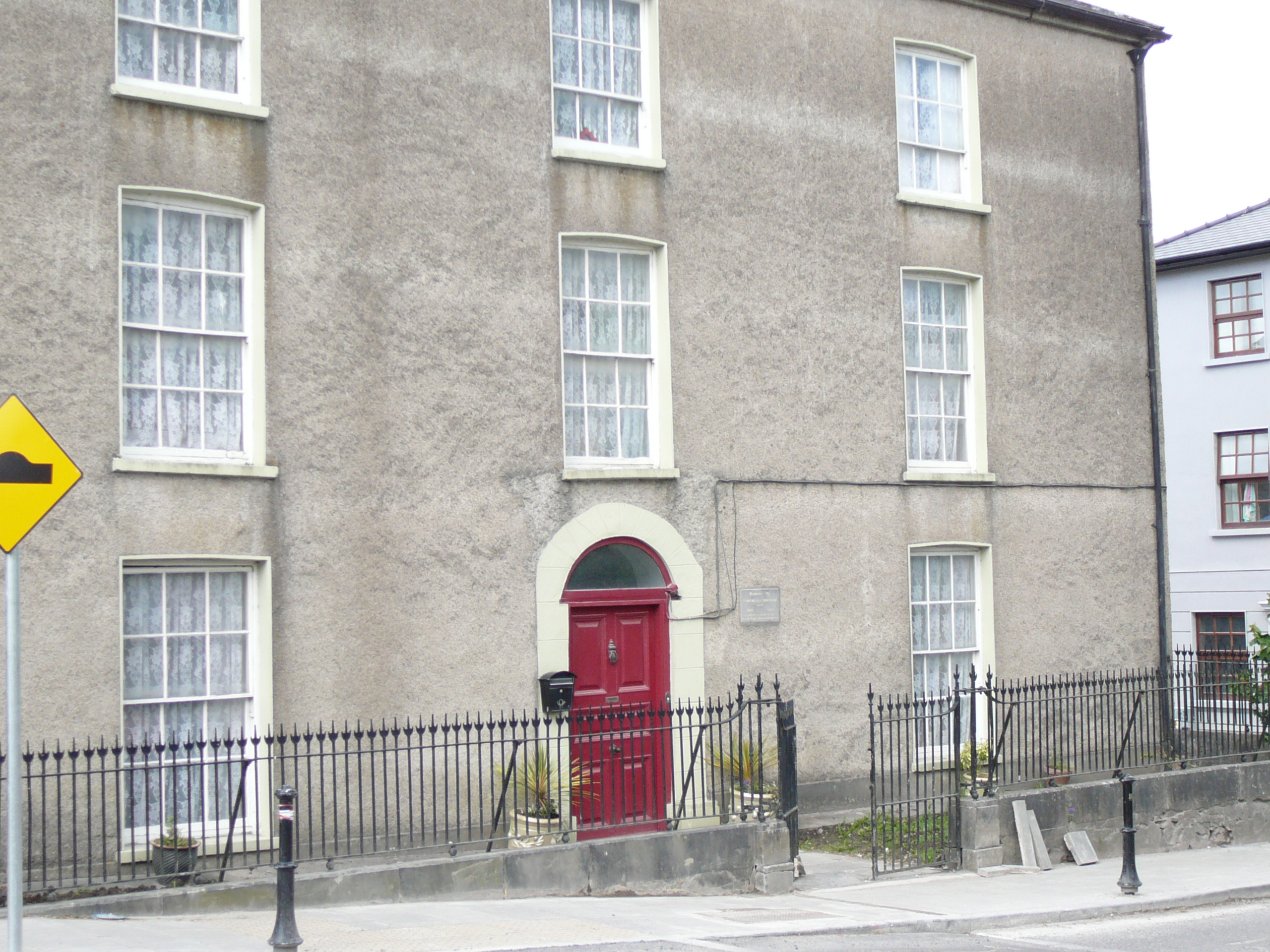
Canon Sheehan's house in Doneraile, as it was in his lifetime

Sheehan began his priestly ministry in the Cathedral Parish and in the former abbey church of St. Nicholas in Exeter in the diaspora diocese of Plymouth. He quickly established a reputation as a preacher and was much sought after for sermons, retreats, and incidental addresses. While in Plymouth, he also acted as a supply chaplain for Dartmoor prison which, at the time, still held several of those convicted for treason felony after the Fenian Rising of 1867. He returned to Ireland in 1877 to take up a curacy in his native Mallow. In 1881 he was transferred to Cobh (then Queenstown) and subsequently back to Mallow where he remained until Bishop Robert Browne nominated him Parish Priest of Doneraile on 4 July 1895.

Sheehan's appointment to Doneraile was an important one and an implicit indication of the trust and confidence placed in him by his bishop. It was the largest territorial parish in the Diocese of Cloyne and incorporated the medieval parishes of Templeroan, Doneraile, Caherduggan, and Rossagh. Bishop Matthew McKenna's Visitation Register of 1785 mentions that the parish of Doneraile had 683 habitations while Cahirduggan possessed 200 and Templeroan 120. It had a long tradition of distinguished pastors since candidates for appointment to Doneraile were often chosen for their ability to promote cordial relations with the St. Legers, Viscount Doneraile, who were generally resident landlords, and politically known (and at times suspect) for their long tradition of enlightened tolerance for their Catholic tenantry which eschewed the traditionally bigoted outlook of their Boyle, Kingston, and Midleton counterparts.

The religious climate in Doneraile, and the support of the St. Legers, had permitted an early restoration of Catholic structures which included a convent and schools (1818), and a fine Catholic Church (1827). The situation was such in Doneraile on 8 August 1869 that Bishop William Keane of Cloyne, during his episcopal visitation, noted that he was able to drive unhampered through the town of Doneraile "in choir dress and stole...to be received at the Church gate by clergy and laity in the manner prescribed by the [Roman] Pontifical", something that could not have happened in towns such as Youghal, Mitchelstown, and Middleton.

== Social engagement ==
During his pastorate in Doneraile, Sheehan established the custom of weekly meetings with his parishioners which were held on Sunday afternoons. In the early years, these meetings concentrated on apprising tenants of the conditions of the Land Purchase Acts, and of their concrete application to their circumstances. By 1903, practically all land leases had been bought out by the tenenary in

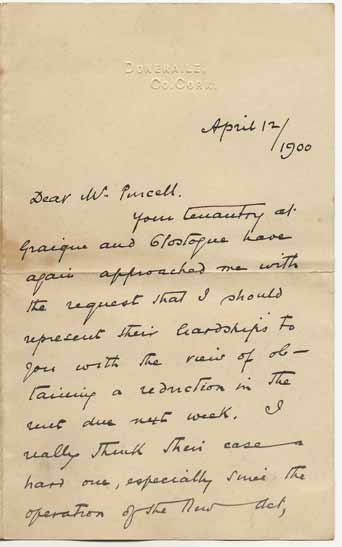
A Letter of Sheehan's

Doneraile parish, without acrimony or agitation and on terms that were satisfactory to both landlord and tenant. From then on, Sheehan concentrated on promoting modern agricultural methods, especially in tillage and dairy farming. The same meetings also resulted in a long series of social improvements in the town of Doneraile which saw the installation of a modern water supply system and the building of an advanced electrification plant.

He also took advantage of the Irish Labourers Act (1883) to pursue a plan to have all cabins demolished and replaced by a modern housing scheme. In all of these enterprises, Sheehan could count on the support of Lord Castletown of Upper Ossory (Bernard Edward Barnaby FitzPatrick, 2nd Baron Castletown), who had married Lord Doneraile's only child, the Honourable Emily Ursula Clare St. Leger. Perhaps it is not completely coincidental that all of these social projects are ruminated on by Sheehan's fictional Parish Priest in, what was perhaps his most successful novel, My New Curate.

One of Canon Shehan's inherited pastoral duties in Doneraile, which he well acquitted, was to act as an independent intermediary between Viscount Doneraile and his tenantry; and between the tenantry and their landlord, so as to avoid the levels of agrarian strife experienced on beleaguered estates such as those of the nearby Earl of Kingston, and to secure the de facto religious liberty traditionally enjoyed by Catholics on the Doneraile estates. Sheehan's arrival in the parish came at a sensitive moment as tenants began the process of purchasing their holdings from the Doneraile, and other smaller local estates, under the terms of the Ashbourne Land Purchase Acts of 1885 and 1887. The Parish Priest of Doneraile was frequently asked to assist tenants in their approaches to the local land agents to agree terms for the purchase of their holdings.

While something of a traditional expectation of a 19th-century Irish Parish Priest, this practical social engagement on Sheehan's part needs to be understood in the wider context of the Catholic intellectual response to the challenge thrown down to capitalism, marxism and socialism by Pope Leo XIII in his encyclical letter Rerum novarum of 1891.

As many of the contemporary theological journals published in Germany, Belgium and France make evident, Catholic theologians, rejecting Marxism, socialism, and the excesses of capitalism, debated and formulated social solutions that would come from the combined actions of the Church, the State, the employer and the employee, and elaborated in greater detail the principles to be used in seeking justice in industrial, social, and economic life. While Sheehan was aware of the social question of his time, and was actively engaged in the great contemporary social evolution directly affecting him in his parish, he can never be regarded as having in any manner espoused the Zeitgeist, as quickly emerges from his portrayal of such a priest in his novel Luke Delmege published in 1901 and, not surprisingly, translated into all of the major European languages.

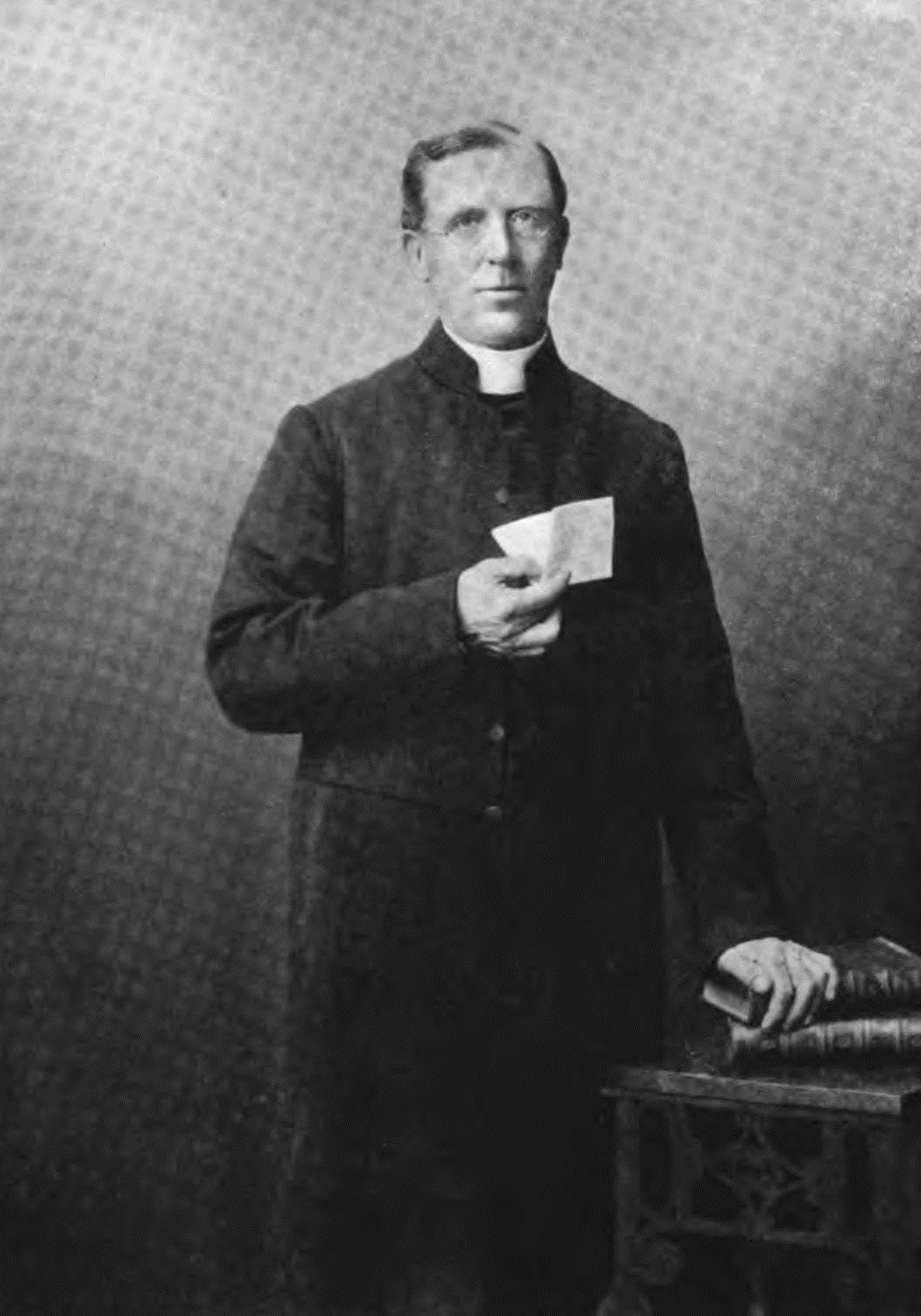
Canon Sheehan in 1898

Writing to the editor of the Irish Ecclesiastical Record in 1913, the then Bishop's Secretary, Fr. William Browne, thus described Sheehan: "He was always courteous and polite, of course, but very silent. When he first came home as a young priest from England, he was stationed here in Queenstown. I rather thought that his silent, reserved manner would have kept people in awe of him, yet when he died, all the older generation had instances to relate of his unostentatious kindness, especially to the poor and sick".

In 1904 he was appointed a Canon of the Chapter of Cloyne and assigned to the prebendary of Kilenemer. He was conferred, honoris causa, with a doctorate in divinity in February 1902 by Pope Leo XIII. In August 1902, he was the recipient of a Doctorate in Literature from the University of St. Albertus Magnus, Wichita, Kansas.

== Literary career ==
Sheehan's literary career modestly began in 1881 with a series of essays published in The Irish Ecclesiastical Record on subjects ranging from religious instruction in intermediate schools to the effects of emigration on the Church; from the philosophy of Ralph Waldo Emerson to the political significance of Léon Gambetta in post-war France; from liberal thought in the United States to a theological critique of a current of patristic thinking in England and in the United States that saw St Augustine of Hippo as the Martin Luther of his age. At a time of intense interest in education and educational methods in Ireland, he made a significant impact on public debate by drawing attention to European educational theories and particularly to the importance of the German Universities.

During this early period, Sheehan began long associations: with the Irish Monthly, founded in Dublin in 1873 by T. A. Finlay and Matthew Russell, to commemorate Ireland's consecration to the Sacred Heart; with the Dublin Review, a quarterly journal of high literary merit, founded for the diffusion of Catholic theology in 1836 by Nicholas Wiseman, Daniel O'Connell and Michael Joseph Quin; and with the Catholic Truth Society, established in 1884 by Herbert Vaughan for the popular promotion of Catholic doctrine. Several pamphlets would be written by him for the Catholic Truth Society on subjects such as Thoughts on the Immaculate Conception, The Canticle of the Magnificat, and Our Personal and Social Responsibilities.

He attracted much attention in Ireland, England, on the continent as well as in the United States through his observations in literary and religious magazines on issues related to clerical life, education and philosophy. He wrote a number of children's stories and published works of poetry, his sermons and his collected essays. Several of his books were translated and published in German, French, Irish, Hungarian, Polish, Czech, Slovenian, Spanish, Ukrainian, Dutch, Flemish and Italian.

Sheehan is best remembered as a novelist; in his novel My New Curate, he recounts an incident of a clerical appointment that may well be autobiographical and refer to his arrival in Doneraile: "The Bishop sent for me and said, with what I would call a tone of pity or contempt, but he was incapable of either, for he was the essence of charity and sincerity: 'Father Dan, you are a bit of a literateur, I understand. Kilronan is vacant. You'll have plenty of time for poetising and dreaming there. What do you say to it?' I put on a little dignity, and though my heart was beating with delight, I quietly thanked his Lordship. But, when I had passed beyond the reach of episcopal vision, which is far stretching enough, I spun my hat in the air, and shouted like a schoolboy: 'Hurrah!'".

== Political activist ==
Sheehan first became politically engaged after the passing of the Land Purchase (Ireland) Act 1903, authored by William O'Brien MP., and set in motion by D. D. Sheehan MP. of Kanturk, the Canon encouraging and giving advice to local tenant farmers in the area around Doneraile to purchase their leases under the act from the local landlords. The success of land purchase in Cork was much to the frustration of John Redmond's Irish Party (IPP) who believed that a national Home Rule movement could not survive without social grievances and without the antagonism of Catholic and Protestant.

Sheehan was a founder and leading member of the All-for-Ireland League (AFIL) launched by William O'Brien in 1910 in opposition to Redmond's party, O'Brien advocating the unity of Catholic and Protestant interests in all walks of Irish political, social and cultural life. Sheehan stood and spoke on platforms advocating the principles of the League, which returned eight Independent M.P.s in the December elections.

Sheehan wrote the manifesto of the movement in a very long editorial for the first issue of the League's new newspaper, O'Brien's radical Cork Free Press in June 1910, which was a manifestation of Joseph Devlin's militantly Catholic Ancient Order of Hibernians, whose members were also members of the IPP, largely influencing its political course, particularly against any form of concessions to Ulster as advocated by the AFIL. The League, so successful in Cork, was less successful elsewhere. Its principles of establishing a movement of a new kind to attract rather than repel Unionist and Protestant support for an All-Ireland Home Rule settlement, while influentially limited, did motivate a worthy political initiative.

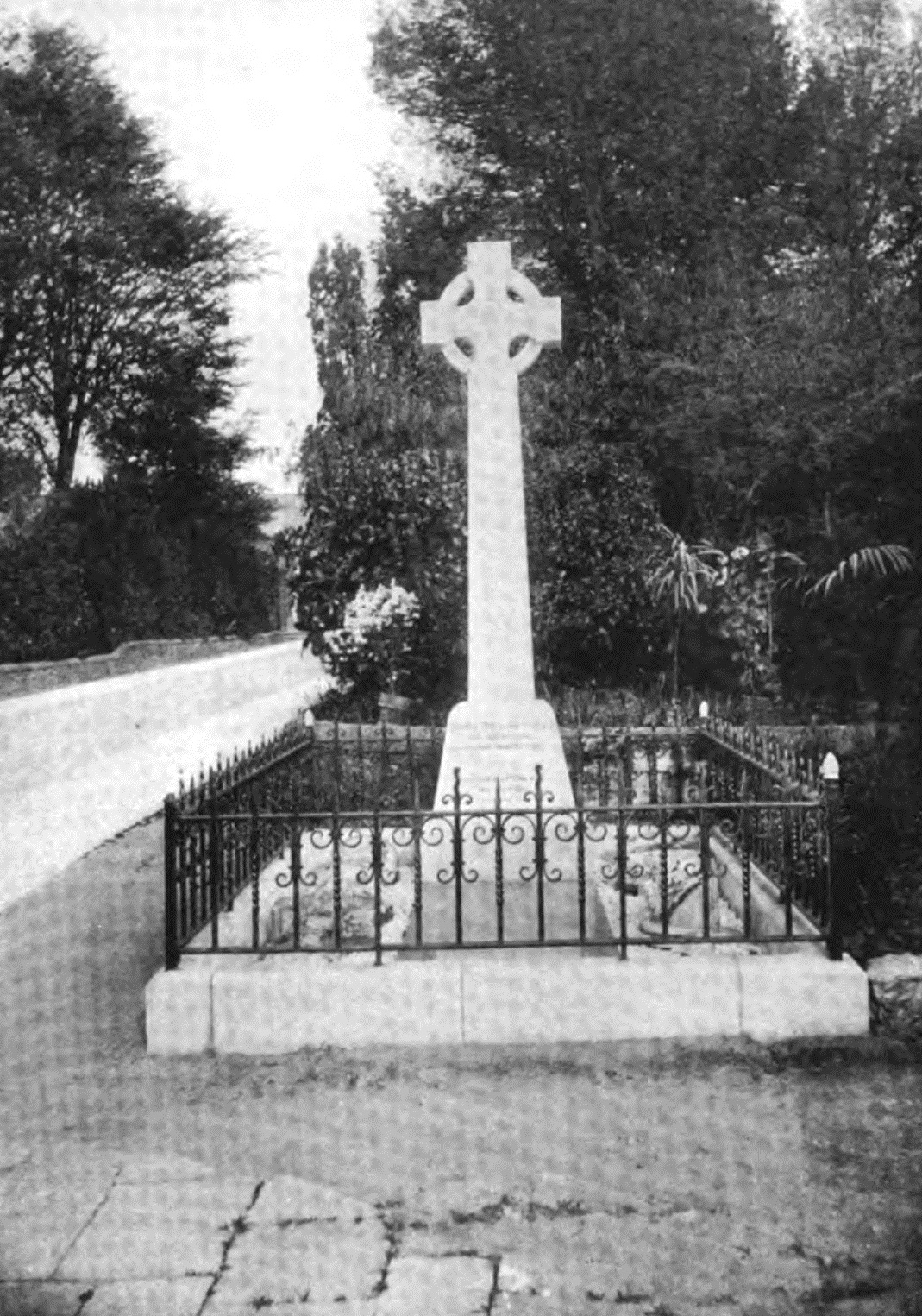
Headstone marking the grave of Canon Sheehan at the entrance of the parish church, Doneraile

Perhaps the most remarkable side of Sheehan was his vision of a reorganised Irish society which he hoped would take shape in an Independent Ireland. His nationalism was neither exclusively Gaelic nor Catholic and best portrayed by him in his novel The Intellectuals (1911), whose archetypical characters of man and women of Catholic and Protestant background from Ireland, England and Scotland, meet to discuss current issues of the day, Sheehan in the preface saying "that his object was to show that there really was no invincible antagonism amongst the people who make up the commonwealth of Ireland that may not be removed by a freer and kindlier intercourse with each other".

== Literary celebrity ==
Lord and Lady Castletown of Doneraile Court befriended Sheehan and held him in the highest esteem. His success as a writer had turned him into a celebrity, and whenever the Castletowns had guests of note, they were invariably brought to meet the man of letters. It was through them that the Canon met the American Justice Oliver Wendell Holmes for the first time in 1903.

A ten-year correspondence ensued, ended only by Sheehan's death. In a letter to the Jesuit Father Herman Heuser, Sheehan's American biographer, Holmes explained: "I was at Doneraile and called every day after luncheon, that time being the best for him. He knew, and I feared, he was dying, though I did not admit it. He bade me go to his library and select a book. On his assurance, I took Francisco Suárez's De Legibus, which I had heard him praise, and it bears his inscription. I wish I could have offered him something besides affection and reverence for his lovely spirit".

Sheehan was diagnosed with a fatal illness in 1910 but refused to undergo surgery, carrying out his parish duties until he died of cancer on the evening of Rosary Sunday, 5 October 1913. Towards the end of his life he had begun to write an autobiography, but burned the manuscript a few days before his death believing that "it might do harm to others".

== University College Cork Digitisation Project ==
In the context of its Corpus of Electronic Texts (CELT), University College Cork has begun a digitisation project to make Sheehan's extensive literary oeuvre available on line. The project began with the publication of his poems and essays which are normally difficult to access in printed form. Over a period of time, all of Canon Sheehan's works will be added to the digital collection.

== Publications ==
Books

- Geoffrey Austin, Student, M. H. Gill & Son, Dublin 1895
- The Triumph of Failure, Burns and Oates, London 1901
- My New Curate, Marlier and Callanan, Boston 1900 ISBN 0-85342-877-8
- Cithera Mea, Marlier and Callanan, Boston 1900
- Mein neuer Kaplan: Erzählung aus dem irischen Priesterleben, translated by Oskar Jacob, J.P. Bachem Verlag, Cologne 1900
- Mariae Corona, Benzinger Brothers, New York
- Collection of Sermons and Essays
- Luke Delmege, Longmans, Green & Co., London & New York 1901
- Mon Nouveau Vicaire, Éditions Pierre Dumont, Limoges 1901
- The Canticle of the Magnificat, Dublin 1901
- Holy Week and the Festival of Easter, Catholic Truth Society, Dublin 1902.
- Mater Dolorosa, Catholic Truth Society, Dublin 1902.
- St. Domnick and St. Teresa, Catholic Truth Society, Dublin 1902.
- Der Erfolg des Mißerfolgs (The Triumph of Failure), translated by Oskar Jacob, Stehl, Kaldenkirchen, 1902.
- Under the Cedars and the Stars, Dolphin Press, Philadelphia 1903.
- Under the Cedars and the Stars, Brown and Nolan, Dublin 1904 (for the Catholic Truth Society of Ireland).
- Under the Cedars and the Stars, Benzinger Brothers, New York 1906.
- Glenanaar, Longmans, Green & Co., London and New York 1905 ISBN 0-86278-195-7
- Geoffrey Austin (German translation), Cologne 1904
- Az én új káplánom : elbeszélés, Budapest: Staphaneum Ny., 1904
- Mijn nieuwe kapelaan/ naar het Engelsch van P.A. Sheehan; vert. uit het Engels door Marie van Beek; met een "woord vooraf" van H. Ermann, Van Leeuwen, Leiden (1904).
- Mój nowy wikary; opowieść z urywków pamietnika proboszcza irlandzkiego. (Przeklad z "Roli" 1902–1903) Przeklad z angielskiego [Polish translation of My New Curate published by Jan Jelenski (1845–1909)], Wydawnictwo Ks. M. Godlewskiego, Warszawa 1904.
- Luke Delmege (Flemish translation by J.J. Raken), P. Brand, Bussum.
- Succes door Mislukking (Flemish translation of The Triumph of Failure), R.K. Boekcentrale, Amsterdam.
- A Spoiled Priest and Other Stories (1905)
- Verhalen door Kanunnik P.A. Sheehan (Dutch translation of A Spoiled Priest and Other Stories translated by J.J.G. Wahlen) : Van Leeuwen, Leiden 1905
- Delmege Lukács : regény az ír lelkipásztori életből, Budapest: Egyházi Közlöny, 1905 Budapest : Stephaneum Ny
- Moj novi kapelan : pripoviest iz irskoga života [Slovenian translation of My New Curate], A. Scholz, Zagreb 1905
- Geoffrey Austin (French Translation), P. Lethielleux, Paris n.d..
- Early Essays and Lectures. London: Longmans, Green, & Co., 1906.
- Der Erfolg des Mißerfolgs, Kalenkirchen 1906
- Succès dans l'Échec, Éditions P. Lethielleux, Paris 1906
- Succes door Mislukking, translated by A. Schmitz, F.H.J. Bekker, Amsterdam 1906.
- Mūj Nový Kaplan, translated into Czech by Alois Koudelka (under the pseudonym O.S. Vetti), Jan Otto, Prague 1906
- Lisheen, Longman, Green & Co., London and New York 1907
- Das Christtagskind,(German translation of Glenanaar), Styl, c.1907 [translated by Oskar Jacob]
- Parerga, Longmans, Green & Co, London and New York 1908
- Mi Nuevo Caodjutor: Sucesos de la vida de un anciano parroco irlandés; traduccion espanola por M.R. Blanco del Monte, Friburgo de Bresgovia (1908)
- The Blindness of Dr. Gray, or, The Final Law, Longmans, Green & Co., London and New York 1909
- Dolina Krvi (Glenenaar), translated by Izidor Cankar, Ljubljana: Katoliška bukvarna 1909 (Slovene translation)
- Pohozené Dítě: Novella, Kotrab, Prague 1909 [Czech translation of Glenanaar]
- Mi Nuevo Coadjutor, Madrid 1910
- Az üldözöttek : írországi regény, Budapest: Szt. István Társ., 1910
- Miĭ novyĭ sotrudnyk; opovidanie iz zapysok irli︠a︡ndsʹkoho parokha [Ukrainian translation of My New Curate], V.A. Shyĭkovsʹkyĭ, Lʹviv 1910
- The Intellectuals. An Experiment in Irish High Club-Life, Longmans, Green & Co, London and New York 1911
- The Queen's Fillet, Longmans, Green & Co, London and New York 1911
- Von Dr. Grays Blindheit, Einsiedeln 1911
- Miriam Lucas, Longmans, Green & Co, London and New York 1912
- Lukas Delmege, Regensburg 1912
- Lukáš Delmege, translated into Czech by Alois Koudelka, Kralín, Prague 1912
- De haarband van de koningin / Kanunnik Sheehan; uit het Engelsch vert. door Th.B.J. Wilmer, Van Leeuwen, Leiden 1912
- Lisheen oder Der Průfstein der Geister, Einsiedeln 1914
- The Graves at Kilmorna, Longmans, Green & Co, London and New York 1915
- Kresalo Duhov(Slovenian translation of Lisheen), translated by Izidor Cankar and Narte Velikonja, Ljubljana, Katoliška bukvarna 1917
- Miriam Lucas (German translation), Einsiedeln 1918 [translated by Oskar Jacob]
- Das Haarband der Königin, Einsiedeln 1919
- Sermons, New York, 1920
- Der Ausgestoßener, Saarlouis 1920
- De graven te Kilmorna (Dutch translation by Arthur Coussens), Thielt, Lannoo, 1922.
- Gray doktor vaksága, vagy A legfőbb törvény : írországi regény, Budapest : Pallas, 1923
- Cithara Mea. Poems
- Our Personal and Social Responsibilities, Dublin
- An Aged and Youthful Confessor, Dublin
- Thoughts on the Immaculate Conception, Dublin 1924
- Mnisi z Trabolganu, Warsaw 1924
- Sprawa Odłożna; Mnisi z Trabolganu: Opowiadnia, Warsaw 1924
- Die Gräber von Kilmorna, Einsiedeln 1926 [translated by Oskar Jacob ]
- Tristram Lloyd, Longmans, Green & Co, London and New York 1928
- The Greatest Doctor, Dublin 1930
- Tristram Lloyd (French translation), translated by E. Masson, Éditions P. Lethielleux, Paris 1930
- Tristram Lloyd (Spanish Translation), translated by Emilio Sanz Pertegas, Bilbao-Madrid, Pia Sdad. S. Pablo, n.d..
- Tristram Lloyd (German translation), translated by Friedrich Ritter von Lama, Haas und Grabherr, Augsburg 1930.
- Gleann an Air: Uirsceal ar Shaoghal i nEirinn, translated by Tomás de Bhial, Oifig an tSoláthair, Dublin 1931
- Luke Delmege (Spanish translation), Castellano, Londres 1932
- How Character is Formed, Dublin 1933
- An Sagart Óg, Dublin 1935
- L'expérience de Robert Maxwell : roman [French translation of Lisheen translated by Alphonse Burgoin], J. Dupuis [et] fils, Paris 1937.
- Lisín, translated by Séamus Ó Grianna, Oifig an tSoláthair, Dublin 1939
- Filéad na bainríoghaine (translation by Séamus Ó Grianna), Oifig an tSoláthair, Dublin 1940
- Tristram Lloyd (Spanish translation), Madrid
- Tristram Lloyd, (Italian translation), translated by Prof. A. Galli (Modena), Alba 1942
- Rita, die Sängerin, Steyler Verl. buchh., Kaldenkirchen; St. Gabriel-Verl., Wien-Mödling, 1953
- Il Mio Nuovo Cappellano, Edizioni Paoline, Roma 1954
- Il Mio Nuovo Curato : giornale umoristico di un veccho prevosto d'Irlanda, translated by F. Zanetti, Benedetto Bacchini, Milan.
- Il Trionfo dell'Insuccesso, translated by Marilinda Machina, Edizioni Paoline, Francavilla-al-mare 1968
- La Benda della Regina, translated by Emma Masci Kiesler, Milano 1970

Articles, Essays, Sketches and Reviews

- Religious Instruction in Intermediate Schools. In: The Irish Ecclesiastical Record, Vol.II, No.9 (September 1881), pp. 521–531.
- In a Dublin Art Gallery. In: The Irish Ecclesiastical Record, Vol. II, no. 12 (December 1881), pp. 726–742.
- The Effects of Emigration on the Church. In: The Irish Ecclesiastical Record., vol. III, no. 10 (October 1882), pp. 602–615.
- Gambetta. In: The Irish Ecclesiastical Record, vol. IV, no.3 (March 1883), pp. 137–152.
- Emerson:Free Thought in America. In: The Irish Ecclesiastical Record, Vol. V, no. 10 (October 1884), pp. 613–623.
- Education at German Universities. In: The Irish Ecclesiastical Record., Vol. VII, no. 6 (June 1886), pp. 496–511; Vol. VII, no. 7 (July 1886), pp. 617–630; vol. VII, no. 8 (August 1886), pp. 685–698.
- The German and Gallic Muse. In: The Irish Ecclesiastical Record., Vol. VIII, no. 6 (June 1887), pp. 42–56.
- The Poetry of Matthew Arnold. In: The Irish Ecclesiastical Record, Vol. IX, no. 6 (June 1888), pp. 481–494.
- Recent Works on St. Augustine. In: The Dublin Review, Vol.XIX, no. 7, (July 1888), pp. 88–107.
- Recent Augustinian Literature. In: The Irish Ecclesiastical Record, Vol.VIII, no.12 (December 1888), pp. 1069–1082.
- The Life and Influence of St. Augustine. In: The Irish Monthly, Vol. XVIII, May and June 1890, pp. 200–209 and 241–246.
- The two civilisations. Parts I and II. In: The Irish Monthly, Vol. XVIII, June and July 1890, pp. 293–301 and 358–367.
- The Seraph of Assisi. In The Irish Monthly, Vol. XVII, September 1890, pp. 468–479.
- The Late Father C. P. Meehan. In The Catholic World, Volume 51, (Issue 306), Sept 1890; pp. 796–801.
- Irish Youth and High Ideals. In The Irish Monthly, Vol. XIX, January 1891, pp. 39–54.
- Sir C. Gavan Duffy's Life of Thomas Davis. In The Catholic World, Volume 53 (Issue 317), Aug 1891; pp. 746–751.
- Impressions of Tennyson. In The Irish Monthly, Vol. XX, November 1892, pp. 602–606.
- The First Sin: a poem beginning "I said the prayer: 'Into Thy hands'". In: The Irish Monthly, Vol. XXI, October 1893, pp. 526–530.
- A Sunday in Dartmoor. In: The Irish Monthly, Vol. XXII, February 1894, pp. 80–88.
- Mr. Aubrey de Vere's New Volume. In The Irish Monthly, Vol. XXII, March 1894, pp. 126–138.
- Pretres-Adorateurs. In: The Irish Ecclesiastical Record, Vol.XV, no. 7 (July 1894), pp. 576–585.
- The Golden Jubilee of O'Connell's death. In: The Irish Monthly, Vol. XXV, July 1897, pp. 337–350.
- Optimism v. Pessimism. I. In Literature. II. In daily life. In: The Irish Monthly, Vol. XXV, January 1897, pp. 39–52.
- The Dead and One of our Dead. In: The Irish Monthly, Vol. XXV, September 1897, pp. 489–494.
- Known by Fruits. In: Irish Monthly, vol. XXVI, n.295 (January 1898), pp. 21–27.
- Remanded. In: The Catholic World, vol. 66, n.394 (January 1898), pp. 437–452.
- Literary Criticism. In The American Ecclesiastical Review, Vol. XVIII, June 1898, p. 591.
- Our personal and social responsibilities. In: The Irish Monthly, Vol. XXVII, May and June 1899, pp. 225–233 and 292–304.
- The Literary Movement in Ireland. In: Sacred Heart Review (Boston), vol. 26, no. 20, 16 November 1901, pp. 308–309.
- The Literary Movement in Ireland. In: Sacred Heart Review (Boston), vol. 26, n.23, 7 December 1901, pp. 356–357.
- Fr. Mac on Retreat: In The American Ecclesiastical Review, 1902.
- Books that influenced "Luke Delmege". In: The Irish Monthly, Vol. XXX, February 1902, pp. 109–114.
- Dawn of the New Century. In: The Irish Ecclesiastical Record, fourth series, Vol.XV, no. 1, (January 1904), pp. 5–26.
- Non-dogmatic religion. In: The New Ireland Review, Vol. XXIII, August 1905, pp. 321–333.
- The Literary life. In: The Irish Monthly, Vol. XXXVII, April 1909, pp. 181–202
- Irish Primary Education. In: The Irish Monthly, Vol. XLV, January 1917, pp. 49–64.

Hymns, Poems and Sonnets

- St. Augustine at Ostia: a poem beginning "At Ostia? Yes! "Twas the springtime. In: The Irish Monthly, Vol. XVI, June 1888, pp. 349–350.
- The First Sin: a poem beginning "I said the prayer: 'Into Thy hands'". In: The Irish Monthly, Vol. XXI, October 1893, pp. 526–530.
- Ave Atque Vale: a poem beginning "When with a song of heavenly mirth". In: The Irish Monthly, Vol. XXI, December 1893, pp. 631–632.
- Sentan the Culdee: a poem beginning "This is the vision of a man of God". In: The Irish Monthly, Vol. XXIV, January 1896, pp. 1–10.
- Death, the magician: a poem beginning "For I do hate thee O thou spectre, Death". In: The Irish Monthly, Vol. XXIV, November 1896, pp. 594–595.
- Hymn to spring: a poem beginning "O Earth, awake from thy slumbers". In: The Irish Monthly, Vol. XXV, April 1897, pp. 217–218.
- On the Mer-de-Glace: a poem beginning "Hither God brought his rebel seas to try". In: The Irish Monthly, Vol. XXV, August 1897, p. 439.
- Known by fruits. In: The Irish Monthly, Vol. XXVI, January 1898, pp. 21–27.
- The elf child: a poem beginning "Mother is this the storm-fiend". In: The Irish Monthly, Vol. XXVI, February 1898, p. 72.
- Sonnets of travel: beginning "The dying sun had sucked his last red beam". In: The Irish Monthly, Vol. XXVI, April 1898, pp. 180–181.
- My oratory lamp: a poem beginning "Lord, Thou hast kindled all Thy lamps tonight". In: The Irish Monthly, Vol. XXVI, June 1898, p. 320.
- Swallows of Allah: a poem beginning "Swallows of Allah, unfurl your white wings". In: The Irish Monthly, Vol. XXVI, November 1898, pp. 601–602.
- Thalassa! O Thalassa! a poem beginning: "Can you see the spine of yonder crest". In: The Irish Monthly, Vol. XXVII, April 1899, pp. 188–189.
- The Leper Priest of Luneburg. In The Irish Monthly, Vol. 17, No. 196 (Oct. 1889), pp. 537–542.
- Gachla, the druidess: a poem beginning "A relic of an old-time rune". In: The Irish Monthly, Vol. XXVIII, January 1900, pp. 1–15.
- The bird and the fly: a poem beginning "I saw a speck on my window pane". In: The Irish Monthly, Vol. XXVIII, August 1900, pp. 482–483.
- A game of chess: a poem beginning "A square of black and a square of white". In: The Irish Monthly, Vol. XXVIII, September 1900, pp. 523–524.
- The cry of the curlews: a poem beginning "A lonely whitewashed cottage". In: The Irish Monthly, Vol. XXIX, June 1901, pp. 287–288.
- To a post—two voices: a poem beginning "Strong watcher o'er the night wolds". In: The Irish Monthly, Vol. XXXII, October 1904, pp. 600–604.
- Woman and child: a poem beginning "We watched the sunset together". In: The Irish Monthly, Vol. XXXV, February 1907, pp. 83–86.

Plays

- Lost Angel of a Ruined Paradise. A Play, Longmans, Green & Co, London and New York 1904
- Ange Egaré d'un Paradis Ruiné, Éditions P. Lethielleux, Paris 1907

== Bibliography ==
- Herman Heuser: Book Review of Geoffrey Austin. In The American Ecclesiastical Review, vol. XVII, October 1897, pp. 327–328.
- Anonymous: Talk about New Books. In The Catholic World (New York), vol. 71 (May 1900), pp. 272–277.
- Maurice Francis Egan: Cithara Mea - A Book Review. In TheCatholic University Bulletin (Washington, DC), vol. VII, no. 2 [February 1901], pp. 180–182.
- Anonymous: Der Erfolg des Mißerfolges: from the Maria Laach publication Stimmen aus Maria-Laach, vol. LXV (1903), pp. 111–112.
- Matthew Russell: The Author of My New Curate. In The Dolphin, vol. 1, no. 1 (January 1902), pp. 12–20.
- Anonymous: A Curious Fact About Fr. Sheehan's Irish Characters. In The Sacred Heart Review (Boston), vol. 27, no. 9, 1 March 1902, p. 141.
- Matthew Russell, Notes on New Books. In: Irish Monthly, vol. 30, n. 46, April 1902, pp. 237–238.
- Matthew Russell, Notes on new Books. In Irish Monthly, vol. 30, no. 353 (November 1902), p. 656 (announcement of French translations).
- Matthew Russell: Concerning the Author of "Luke Delmege". In The Irish Monthly, Vol.XXX December 1902, pp. 661–669.
- Anonymous: "Ames Celtiques et Ames Saxonnes". In "Le Mois littéraire et pittoresque", tome VIII (1902), p. 138.
- Stephen Gwynn: To-Day and To-Morrow in Ireland, Dublin, Hodges Figgis 1903, pp. 142–157.
- C.P., Dr. Sheehan's New Book: An Appreciation. In The Irish Monthly, Vol. 32, No. 367 (Jan. 1904), pp. 13–17
- William Kirkpatrick Magee: The Breaking of the Ice [Review of Under the Cedars and the Stars]. In: Dana, 1 (May 1904), pp. 11–17.
- Anonymous: "Geoffrey Austin". In "Le Mois littéraire et pittoresque", tome XI (1904), p. 182.
- Joseph Spillmann: Lukas Delmege. In: Stimmen aus Maria Laach (subsequently Stimmen der Zeit), vol. LXVI (1904), pp. 102–109
- Anonymous: Review of A Spoiled Priest and Other Stories. In: The Tablet, 10 October 1904.
- Et Cetera: Review of A Spoiled Priest and Other Stories. In: The Tablet, 26 November 1904.
- Lizzie Twigg: Songs and Poems ... With introduction by ... Canon Sheehan. Longmans & Co.: London, 1905.
- Anonymous: Glenanaar [A book review]. In Sacred Heart Review (Boston), vol, 34, n. 2, 8 July 1905, p. 24.
- Mrs. Augustine J. Daly: Face to Face with the Author of My New Curate. In Sacred Heart Review (Boston), vol. 34, n. 15, 7 October 1905, p. 9.
- James Britten:Review of Glenanaar. In Catholic Book News (London, CTS), vol. IX, n. 97, 10 July 1905, p. 207.
- W. H. Grattan Flood, Dr. Sheehan's new novel: a review of "Glenanaar" by Canon Sheehan. In The New Ireland review, Vol. XXIII, pp. 380–382, August 1905.
- Anonymous: Glenanaar [Book Review]. In: The Spectator, 26 August 1905, p. 20.
- Edward Nagle: Dr. Sheehan's Latest Work. In The Irish Ecclesiastical Record, Ser. 4, Vol. VIII, September 1905, pp. 214–115.
- Anonymous: Book Notices [Review of Glenanaar]. In: Otago Daily Times [New Zealand], Issue 13413, 13 October 1905, Page 3.
- Firmin Roz: Le Clergé Irlandais. In: La Revue politique et littéraire, Series 5, tome VI, n. 26 [29 December 1906], pp. 809–812.
- Anonymous: People We Hear About. In: New Zealand Tablet, Volume XXXIV, Issue 5, 1 February 1906, Page 10.
- Anonymous: New Books and Publications [Review of Glenanaar]. In: Press [New Zealand], Volume LXII, Issue 12424, 10 February 1906, Page 7.
- Anonymous: Literary Column [Review of Glenanaar]. In: Evening Post [New Zealand], Volume LXXI, Issue 71, 24 March 1906, Page 11.
- G.K. Chesterton, The Vanity of Essays [a review of Early Essays and Lectures, London 1906]. In: The Daily News, 31 October 1906.
- Anonymous: Forthcoming Books [Review of Early Essays]. In:Otago Daily Times, Issue 13741, 3 November 1906, Page 5.
- Anonymous: Early Essays and Lectures [Book Review]. In: The Spectator, 17 November 1906.
- Michael James: Some Aspects of Canon Sheehan. In New Ireland Review, Vol. XXVI, February 1907 pp. 365–371; Vol. XXVII March 1907 pp. 15–27.
- The Constant Reader: Browsings in Bookland. In: Otago Daily Times [New Zealand], Issue 14108, 11 January 1908, Page 7.
- Anonymous: Literary Notes [Review of Lisheen]. In: Dominion [New Zealand], Volume 1, Issue 122, 15 February 1908, Page 13
- M.B. [Dublin Correspondent]: Our Irish Letter [Review of Lisheen]. In: New Zealand Tablet, Volume XXXVI, Issue 12, 26 March 1908, Page 27.
- Anonymous: Literary Notes [Review of Lisheen]. In: Timaru Herald [New Zealand], Volume XIIC, Issue 13556, 28 March 1908, Page 1
- Anonymous: School Prize Books. In: New Zealand Tablet, 27 August 1908, Page 21.
- Anonymous: Intercolonial [report on the terna for diocese of Lismore]. In: New Zealand Tablet, 8 July 1909, Page 33.
- Anonymous: His Contradiction of Character. In: Otago Daily Times, Issue 14596, 7 August 1909, Page 13.
- Anonymous: People WE Hear About. In: New Zealand Tablet, 30 September 1909, Page 1548
- Cornelia Pelly: An Hour with Canon Sheehan. In Irish Monthly, vol. XXXVI, no. 426 [December 1908], pp. 689–693.
- Cardinal Désiré Félicien François Joseph Mercier, Archbishop of Malines: Cardinal Mercier's Conferences delivered to his Seminarists at Mechlin in 1907.
  Translated from the French by J. M. O'Kavanagh. With an introduction by the Very Rev. P. A. Canon Sheehan. London: R. & T. Washbourne 1910.
- Anonymous: The Final Law [Review of the Blindness of Dr. Gray]. In: New Zealand Herald, Volume XLVII, Issue 14370, 14 May 1910, Page 4.
- Helena Concannon: Canon Sheehan's Woman Characters. In The Leader, 13 and 20 September 1910.
- The Constant Reader: The Swinbourne of Italy. In: Otago Daily Times [New Zealand], Issue 15148, 20 May 1911, Page 13.
- The Constant Reader: The Winter Show. In: Otago Daily Times, Issue 15214, 5 August 1911, Page 13.
- Anonymous: The Queen's Fillet [Book review]. In: The Spectator, 30 September 1911, p. 22.
- Sophie O'Brien: Canon Patrick Sheehan, DD. In America, Vol. 10, no. 2, [October 1913], p. 48.
- Anonymous: Obituary. In The New York Times, 7 October 1913.
- Et Cetera: Obituary. In: The Tablet, 11 October 1913, p. 28.
- Anonymous: Obituary. In Sacred Heart Review (Boston), vol. 50, n. 17, 11 October 1913.
- Anonymous: Obituary. In: Otago Daily Times, Issue 15922, 15 November 1913, Page 7.
- Anonymous: Saintly Priest Called to his Eternal Reward. In: The Southern Guardian (Arkansas), 18 October 1913, p. 7.
- Constant Reader: Fire Underground and at Sea. In: Otago Daily Times, Issue 15898, 18 October 1913, Page 14.
- Et Cetera. In: The Tablet, 22 October 1913.
- Anonymous: Canon Sheehan of Doneraile: Death of a Great Catholic Novelist. In: Catholic Press (New South Wales), 13 November 1913.
- Bishop Robert Browne: Canon First and Last a Priest. In Sacred Heart Review (Boston), vol. 50, n.22, 15 November 1913.
- Anonymous: Obituary. In: The Freeman's Journal (Sydney, New South Wales), 20 November 1913, p. 8.
- Anonymous: Obituary. In: Catholic Press (New South Wales), 20 November 1913.
- Stanhope William Sprigg: Obituary. In: The Advertiser (Adelaide, Southern Australia), 22 November 1913.
- Mrs. William O'Brien: William O'Brien and Cannon Sheehan. In: Freeman's Journal (Sydney, New South Wales), 27 November 1913.
- Anonymous, Death of Canon Sheehan. In: New Zealand Herald, Volume L, Issue 15490, 24 December 1913, Page 11.
- The souvenir of Canon Sheehan being extracts from his writings made by a Sister of the Presentation Convent, Doneraile. London: Burns and Oates, 1914.
- Michael Phelan, SJ, Canon Sheehan: A Sketch, Dublin: CTSI, 1913.
- Anonymous, Obituary of Canon Sheehan. In The Irish Book Lover, Vol. V, pp. 62–63, November 1913.
- Vilelm Schweitzer, Patrik Augustin Sheehan. In Dom in Svet, Vol. 26, no. 12 [1913], pp. 447–448.
- Anonymous, Newman Society. In: New Zealand Herald, Volume LI, Issue 15559, 17 March 1914, Page 5.
- M.M.B., Canon Sheehan at Home in Doneraile. In: The Irish Monthly, vol. 43, n. 506, August 1915, pp. 529–534.
- John D. Colclough, Canon Sheehan: A Reminiscence and an Appreciation. In Studies, vol. VI, no. 22, June 1917, pp. 275–288.
- John Horgan, Canon Sheehan: A Memory and an Appreciation. In The Irish Monthly, Vol. XLII, pp. 1–12, January 1914.
- Herman Joseph Heuser: Canon Sheehan of Doneraile: the story of an Irish parish priest as told chiefly by himself in books, personal memoirs, und letters. New York: Longmans & Co., 1917
- George O'Neill: A relic of Canon Sheehan. In Studies, Vol. VI, no. 23, September 1917, pp. 385–397.
- Anonymous: Canon Sheehan One of the Greatest Irish Writers. In Sacred Heart Review (Boston), vol. 58, n. 24, 24 November 1917, p. 10.
- Jože Debevec: Kresalo Duhov. In Dom in svet, Ljubljana, Vol. 30 (1917), nos. 5/6, p. 183.
- Anonymous: Canon sheehan Realized the Need for Religion in Irish Schools. In Sacred Heart Review (Boston), vol. 59, n. 8, 23 February 1918, p. 9.
- John J. Horgan: "Canon Sheehan of Doneraile by Herman Heuser" book review. In Studies, vol. VII, no. 25, March 1918, pp. 48–51.
- Maurice F. Egan: Canon Sheehan of Doneraile. In The Atlantic Monthly, September 1918, pp. 368–370.
- Leigh G. Hubbell: Canon Sheehan in Perspective. In The Notre Dame Scholastic, vol. III, n.2, 19 October 1918, pp. 18-20.
- Shane Leslie: Canon Sheehan of Doneraile. In Dublin Review, vol. 162 (1918).
- Arthur Coussens: P. A. Sheehan, zijn leven en zijn werken. Brugge 1923.
- Daniel Corkery: The Neglect of Canon Sheehan. In Irish Independent, 30 May 1924.
- Cecilia Williams: The constructive ideas of Canon Sheehan's fiction, M.A. thesis submitted to the University of Notre Dame (Indiana) 1924.
- Francis Boyle (Curate of Cooley, Carlingford): Canon Shehan: a Sketch of his Life and Works. Dublin: M. H. Gill & Son 1927.
- Anonymous: Sheehan of Doneraile[Book review of Canon Sheehan by Francis Boyle]. In The Tablet, 10 September 1927, p. 10.
- W. H. K.: Another Novel by Canon Sheehan of Doneraile [Book Review of Tristram Lloyd]. In The Tablet 17 November 1928, p. 643.
- Sophie O'Brien: Memories of Canon Sheehan. In Studies, Vol. XIX September 1930, pp. 492–498.
- Herman Heuser: Kanonikus Sheehan von Doneraile [Biographical introduction] to Tristram Lloyd (German translation), Haas und Graabherr, Augsburg 1930.
- Irma Louise Henry: Catholic leadership and Catholic Action in the works of Canon Sheehan, B.A. thesis submitted to Xavier University of Louisiana, 1932.
- Armand P Laverdiere: Clerical life in Ireland according to Canon Sheehan's works, M.A. thesis submitted to St. Mary's Seminary (Baltimore, Md.), 1932.
- William F. P. Stockley: Essays in Irish Biography. Cork 1933
- Joseph Metzger: Das Katolische Schrifttum im heutigen England. Munich 1935
- Mary Carmelita Harmon: The mystical in Canon Sheehan's works, M.A. thesis submitted to Creighton University, 1935.
- Sophie Raffalovich O'Brien: My Irish Friends. Dublin, London, Burns, Oates & Washbourne 1937.
- Alice Vale: Canon Sheehan and Social Reform:Dissertation accepted for higher degrees in the Graduate school of Arts and Sciences, Volumes 1–10, Fordham University 1937.
- M. H. Rev. Gaffney, Dr. Herman J. Houser and Canon Sheehan. In The Irish Ecclesiastical Record, Ser. 5, Vol. LIV, pp. 367–374, October 1939.
- Donnchadh Mechan: Canon Sheehan. In The Bookman, Vol. II, n.3, December 1947, pp. 46–59.
- Francis MacManus: The fate of Canon Sheehan. In The Bell, Vol. XV, n.2, November 1947, pp. 16–27.
- James Hurley: The Nationalism of Canon Sheehan, an unpublished thesis presented for the degree of Master of Arts, University College Cork (1950).
- J. B. Morton: A Forward. In: The Graves at Kilmorna, Clonmore and Reynolds, Dublin 1950.
- Anonymous, Glenanaar [A Book Review]. In: The Irish Monthly, vol. 79, n.935 May 1951, pp. 249–251.
- Michael P. Linehan: Canon Sheehan of Doneraile: Priest, Novelist, Man of Letters. Dublin: Talbot Press 1952.
- Gladys V. Towers, Canon Sheehan. In The IrishMonthly, Vol. LXXX, March 1952, pp. 112–117.
- Thomas Halton, The Theology of Canon Sheehan. In The Irish Ecclesiastical Record, Ser. 5, Vol. LXXIII, December 1952, pp. 431–439.
- Fr. Senan, OFM Cap. (edt): The Capuchin Annual 1952 Dublin 1952.
- John Henning: The Place of German Theology in Works of Canon Sheehan. In Irish Ecclesiastical Review, Ser. 5, Vol. LXXX December 1953, pp. 379–387.
- John Hennig: A Note on Canon Sheehan's Interest in German Literature. In: The Modern Language Review, 49 [1954], pp. 352–355.
- Benedict Kiely: Canon Sheehan: The Reluctant Novelist. In Irish Writing, no. 37, Autumn 1957, pp. 35–45.
- Kenneth Macgowan: Canon Sheehan of Doneraile. [With a portrait.]. Dublin: Catholic Truth Society of Ireland 1963.
- Kenneth McElligott: The figure of the priest in the novels of Canon Sheehan, an M.A. thesis submitted to St. Bonaventure University, New York, 1965.
- M. P.Linehan:A New Look at Canon Sheehan of Doneraile. In Irish Independent, 27, 28, 29 November 1968.
- Anthony Coleman: Canon Sheehan: The Dilemma of Priest and Artist. In Studies, (Spring 1969), pp. 215–145.
- Oliver McDonagh: The nineteenth century novel and Irish social history : some aspects [O'Donnell lecture delivered at University College Cork on 21 April 1970], National University of Ireland, 1970.
- Liam Brophy, Canon Sheehan: the Great European. In: Eirig, November 1972, pp. 12–13.
- Jeremiah Lovett: Visionen and technique in the Novels of Canon Sheehan, a thesis presented for the degree of Master of Arts, Maynooth, 1974.
- Patrick Braybrooke: Some Victorian and Georgian Catholics. Ayre Publishing, 1977. ISBN 0-8369-1325-6.
- Robert Forde: Canon Sheehan: From Unpublished Letters. In Seanchas Duthalla 1978–1979 no date or place of publication.
- Robert Forde: Canon Sheehan: From Unpublished Letters. In Seanchas Duthalla 1980–1981 no date or place of publication.
- Sean Ua Cearnaigh: An Canonah O Siochain agus an Ghaeilge. In: Comhar, vol. 42, no. 10 October 1983, pp. 25–26.
- John R. Aherne: Serendipity : essays on Robert Hugh Benson, Maurice Baring, Alice Meynell, G.K. Chesterton, Patrick Sheehan, Kate Chopin, Merrimack College Press 1985.
- Robert Forde: Canon Sheehan: From Unpublished Letters. In: Journal of the Mallow Field Club, no. 4 [1986]
- Tom Gavin: Priests and Patriots: Irish Separation and Fear of the Modern, 1890–1914. In: Irish Historical Studies, vol. 25, n. 97 (May 1986), pp. 67–81.
- Anna Theresa Murphy: Warm Humanity of Canon Sheehan's Stories. In Southern Star, 15 April 1989.
- Anna Theresa Murphy: High Ideals and Integrity of Doneraile Priest. In Southern Star, 22 April 1989.
- Brendan Clifford: Canon Sheehan: A Turbulent Priest. Millstreet, Co. Cork: Aubane Historical Society; Dublin: Irish Heritage Society, 1990. ISBN 1-873063-00-8
- Michael Barry: By Pen and Pulpit: Life and Times of the Author Canon Sheehan. Saturn Books, 1990. ISBN 0-9515387-1-3
- Mary O'Neill: A view from the pulpit : the novels of Canon Sheehan, a thesis presented for the degree of Master of Arts, University College Cork (1990).
- John Cronin:Canon Sheehan, Luke Delege: In The Anglo-Irish Novel: 1900–1940, Vol II, Appletree: Belfast 1990, pp. 22–29.
- David H. Burton: The Friendship of Justice Holmes and Canon Sheehan. In Harvard Library Bulletin, Vo. 25, n.2 [April 1977].
- David Henry Burton (Hrsg.): Holmes-Sheehan Correspondence: The letters of Justice Oliver Wendell Holmes and Canon Patrick Augustine Sheehan.
  Port Washington, NY: Kennikat Press, 1976. ISBN 0-8046-9164-9 Revised edition: Fordham University Press 1993. ISBN 0-8232-1525-3
- D. M. Collie: The Nineteenth-Century Novel: A Postscript: The Case for Canon Sheehan (1852–1913). In The Linen Hall Review, Vol. 10, No. 3 (Winter, 1993), p. 8.
- Johannes Madey: Patrick Augustine Sheehan. In: Biographisch-Bibliographisches Kirchenlexikon (BBKL). Band 9, Bautz, Herzberg 1995, ISBN 3-88309-058-1, p. 1598.
- Catherine Candy: Priestly Fictions: Popular Irish Novelists of the Early 20th. Century; Patrick A. Sheehan, Joseph Guinam, Gerald O'Donovan. Dublin: Wolfhound Press 1995. ISBN 0-86327-334-3
- Alix Davis, The Novels of Canon Sheehan. [Oral Presentation], Department of English Public Lecture, University College, Cork, 9 February 1995.
- Robert Forde: Canon Sheehan: Unpublished Manuscripts 1. In: Journal of the Mallow Field Club, no. 13 [1995]
- Robert Welch, Bruce Stewart edts.: Oxford Companion to Irish Literature: article on Canon Sheehan, Oxford University Press 1996, p. 518
- Ruth Fleischmann: Catholic Nationalism in the Irish Revival: A Study of Canon Sheehan 1852–1913. Basingstoke: Palgrave Macmillan 1997. ISBN 0-333-68943-7; ISBN 0-312-17366-0
- William H. Murphy: Catholic Fiction and Social Reality in Ireland 1873–1922, Greenwood Publishing, Westpoint CT, 1997.
- Gerard Moran (editor): Radical Irish Priests, 1660–1970. Dublin: Four Courts Press 1998. ISBN 1-85182-249-6; ISBN 1-85182-281-X
- Benedict Kiely: A Raid into Dark Corners: and other Essays: Cork: Cork University Press 1999.
- Joachim Fischer: Canon Sheehan und die deutsche Kultur. In: Joachim Fischer, Das Deutschlandbild der Iren 1890–1939, Winter Verlag Heidelberg 2000.
- Robert Forde: Canon Sheehan: Unpublished Manuscripts 2. In: Journal of the Mallow Field Club, no. 20 [2002]
- Lawrence McBride: 'Sheehan, Patrick Augustine'. In: 'Oxford Dictionary of National Biography', Oxford University Press, 2004.
- Tom Garvin: The Quiet Tragedy of Canon Sheehan: in Studies, vol. 98, Summer (2009).
- Patrick Maume: Sheehan,(Canon) Patrick Augustine. In James McGuire and James Quinn (edts.), Dictionary of Irish Biography, Cambridge: Cambridge University Press 2009. ISBN 9780521633314
- Sheridan Gilley: Canon Patrick Augustine Sheehan: Priest and Novelist. In Peter Clarke (edt.), The Church and Literature, Ecclesiastical History Society, Warrington (GB), 2012. ISBN 9780954680992
- Nora O'Keeffe: Canon Sheehan. In: Small Town Big History: Glimpses of 20th Century Doneraile, Doneraile 2012.
- Bobby Buckley: Canon Sheehan: The Gardener/Philosopher of Doneraile. In: Journal of the Mallow Field Club, no. 30 [2012].
- James O'Brien: The Collected Letters of Canon Sheehan of Doneraile 1883–1913. Wells(GB): SMENOS Publications 2013. ISBN 9780957552111
- Mary Layland: Local Leader. In: Irish Times, 30 April 2013.
- Sarah McDonald: Canon Sheehan: the Author Priest of Doneraile. In: Catholic Life (London), June 2013, pp. 36–38.
- Don O'Leary: Faith, Nature and Science in the Works of Canon Sheehan. In: New Hibernia Review, vol. 17, no. 2, (Summer 2013), pp. 119–135.
- James O'Brien: Canon Sheehan of Doneraile 1852–1913: Outlines for a Literary Biography. Wells(GB): SMENOS Publications 2013. ISBN 9780957552166
- Brian Maye: Comoradh an Chanonaigh – Laoch liteartha a ligeadh i ndearmad. In: The Irish Times (2 October 2013).
- Peter Costello: Canon Sheehan Restored to Prominence. In:The Irish Catholic (3 October 2013, p. 29).
- Peter Costello: A Canon of Rich Literature. In: The Irish Catholic (10 October 2013, p. 14).
- Peter Costello: The Life and Thought of Canon Sheehan. In: The Irish Catholic (28 November 2013).
- Brian McKevitt: Priest Turned Novel Writer. In Alive, n. 195, December 2013.
- James O'Brien: Canon Sheehan of Doneraile Centenary 1913–2013. In: The Vale Star: Christmas Supplement 2013, pp. 42–45.
- Brian Fanning & Tom Garvin: The Books That Define Ireland. Dublin: Irish Academic Press 2014. ISBN 9781908928443
- Fiona Lynch: Canon Sheehan of Doneraile: Outlines for a Literary Biography (a review). In: The Catholic Voice 18 May 2014, p. 22.
- Gabriel Doherty (edt.):Revisiting Canon Sheehan of Doneraile 1852-1913: Author, Activist, Priest. Wells (GB): SMENOS Publications 2014. ISBN 9781910388068
- J. Anthony Gaughan, Canon Sheehan restored to the Pantheon of Irish literature. In: The Irish Catholic (1 March 2015).
- Lawrence W McBride, Sheehan, Patrick Augustine, article in Oxford Dictionary of National Biography Online.
- James O'Brien: Canon Burton's Sketch of Canon Sheehan. In: Journal of the Mallow Field Club, no. 33 [2015]
- James O'Brien: Lord Castletown's Sketch of Canon Sheehan. In: Journal of the Mallow Field Club, no. 34 [2016]
- James O'Brien: Correspondence from the Papers of Canon Sheehan of Doneraile 1888-1913. Wells (GB): SMENOS Publications 2017. ISBN 9781910388334
- James O'Brien: Mother Ita O'Connell's Biographical Sketch of Canon Sheehan. In: Journal of the Mallow Field Club, no. 35 [2017]
- James O'Brien: The Catholic World and Canon Sheehan. In The Catholic Voice 14 February 2020, p. 19; pp. 23–24.
- Gillian Doherty: Canon Sheehan (1852-1913): Catholic Intellectual and Novelist. In Totus Tuus Magazine 16 June 2021.
