= Stimmen der Zeit =

Monthly German magazine

Stimmen der Zeit ("Voices of the Times") is a monthly German magazine published since 1865 by Herder publishers. Its subtitle is Zeitschrift für christliche Kultur, and it publishes articles on Christian culture in the broad sense of the word. It is considered one of the most authoritative German journals in its field.

== History ==
The journal was founded as a Jesuit publication by Gerhard Schneemann and Florian Rieß in the Maria Laach Abbey, a Jesuit abbey in the Eifel, under the name Voices of Maria Laach. Its initial publications were concerned with the Syllabus of Errors. In 1871, after somewhat irregularly publishing single-issue themes, the publishers changed the magazine to a monthly format, whose goal was to reconcile Catholic faith with modern times.

When during Bismarck's Kulturkampf the Maria Laach Abbey was closed, the magazine moved abroad, and after exile in Belgium, Luxembourg, and the Netherlands, the publishers returned to Germany in 1914. The magazine was renamed Stimmen der Zeit and published from Munich. During the Nazi era the magazine (illegally) published the encyclical Mit brennender Sorge. It was shut down for four months and in April 1941 closed altogether; one of its editors, Alfred Delp, was executed in 1945 in connection with the 20 July plot.

== Editors ==
The following people were editors of the magazin:

- Georg Michael Pachtler (1871)
- Rudolf Cornely (1872-1879)
- Gerhard Schneemann (1879–1885)

(...)

- Anton Koch (1946–1952)
- Ivo A. Zeiger (1952)
- Oskar Simmel (1952–1966)
- Wolfgang Seibel (1966–1998)
- Martin Maier (1998–2009)
- Andreas Batlogg (2009–2017)
- Stefan Kiechle (2018–)

== Bibliography ==
- Walter Troxler (1995). "Schneemann, Gerhard SJ". In Bautz, Traugott (ed.). Biographisch-Bibliographisches Kirchenlexikon (BBKL) (in German). Vol. 9. Herzberg: Bautz. cols. 532–534. ISBN 3-88309-058-1.
- Entry for Joseph Florian Rieß in the Allgemeine Deutsche Biographie
- "Die Schriftleitung: Zum Geleit." In: StZ 139 (1946/47) 1–3
- Anton Koch: "Die Stimmen der Zeit im Dritten Reich." In: StZ 196 (1978) 855–857
- Karl H. Neufeld: "Die Stimmen der Zeit nach dem Ersten Weltkrieg. Zu einer neuen Dissertation." In: StZ 197 (1979) 278–281
- Ellen Dietrich: "Zur katholischen Publizistik im Nationalsozialismus: Die Stimmen der Zeit." München 1984.
- Klaus Schatz: "Stimmen der Zeit" im Kirchenkonflikt. Eine innerjesuitische Auseinandersetzung vor 80 Jahren." In: StZ 224 (2006) 147–161.
- o. V. "Stimmen aus Maria Laach--Stimmen der Zeit." In: StZ 175 (1965) 401-415.
