= Creator Mundi =

American Religious Art company

Creator Mundi, Inc.
- Company type: Privately held company
- Industry: Retail
- Founded: 1988
- Headquarters: Littleton, Colorado, USA
- Key people: Hildegard Letbetter, Founder, CEO
- Website: www.creatormundi.com

Creator Mundi, Inc. is a privately held American Religious Art company based in Englewood, Colorado.

It was one of the first companies to import and sell high quality religious themed fine art over the Internet. Creator Mundi is Latin for "Creator of the World".

In 2003, the Denver Westword newspaper honored Creator Mundi with the "Best Store in Cherry Creek" award.

Founded by Hildegard Letbetter, a native of Cologne, Germany, in 1988, and online since the late 1990s, Creator Mundi began as a religious gift store in Littleton, Colorado though it soon diversified adding wholesale product distribution. Creator Mundi now distributes through over 450 gift stores and religious art galleries in the United States.

Creator Mundi imports religious art from Germany, France, Italy, and a variety of other European countries. It is the official US importer of merchandise from the German Abbey of Maria-Laach.
