= Joseph Spillmann =

Swiss writer (1842–1905)

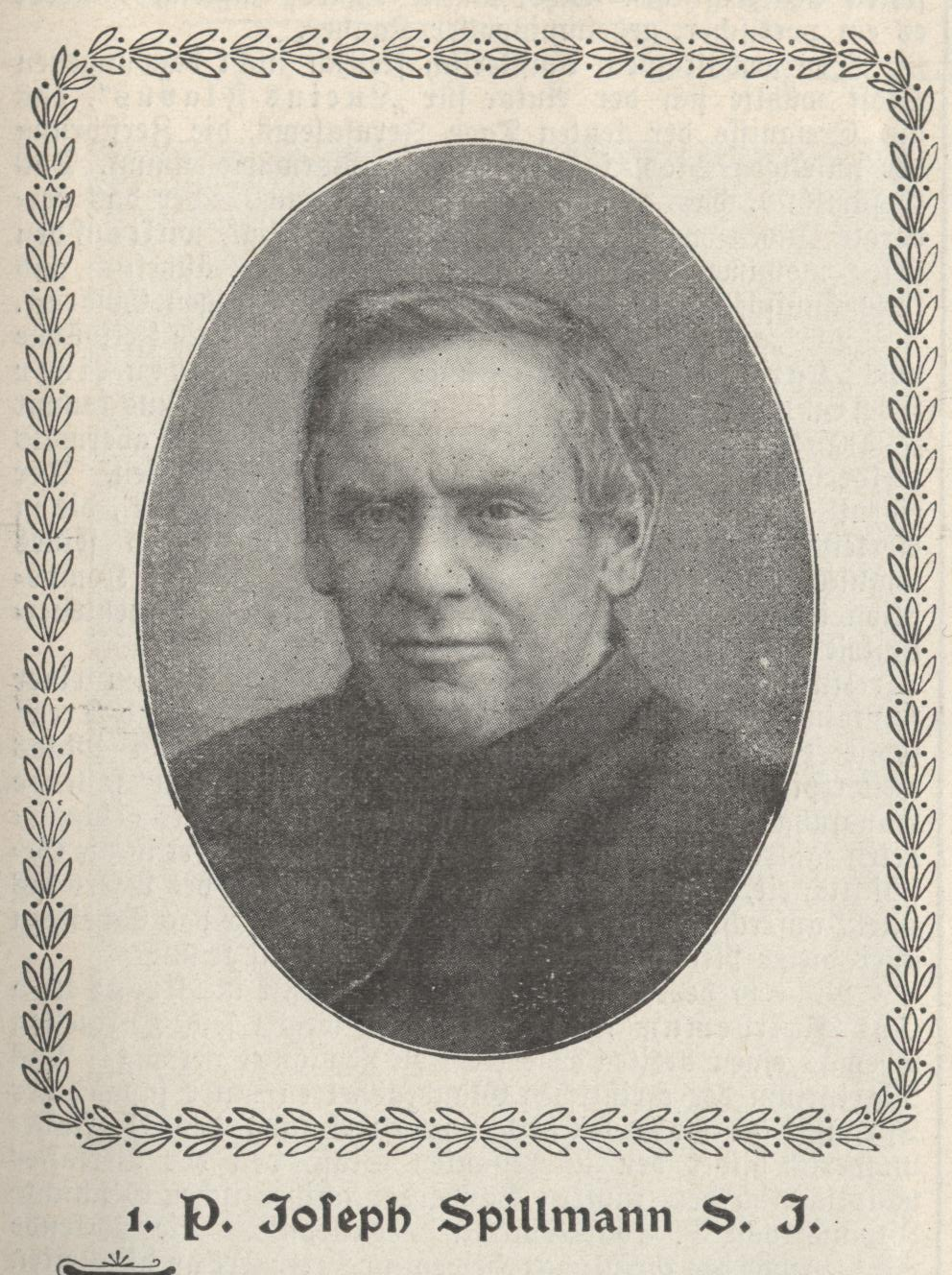
Joseph Spillmann

Joseph Spillmann (b. at Zug, Switzerland, 22 April 1842; d. at Luxembourg, 23 February 1905) was a Swiss Jesuit children's author.

== Life ==
He attended the primary school and gymnasium in Zug, but bad health necessitated his leaving his studies and devoting himself to his father's business. At the age of sixteen he resumed his interrupted studies at the Jesuit college of Feldkirch.

Having entered the Jesuit novitiate at Gorheim (1862), he was sent, during the Franco-Prussian War (1870), to nurse the sick. Ten years later, when his order was banished from Germany, he went to England to complete his theological studies, and in 1874 was ordained priest.

== Works ==
Spillmann's importance arises chiefly from his works for the young. In 1872, he contributed to Georg Michael Pachtler's calendar Der Hausfreund. He was appointed collaborator on the "Stimmen aus Maria-Laach" (founded in 1871) and the "Katholische Missionen" (founded in 1873). Spillmann's literary activity resulted chiefly from his connection with these periodicals, especially the "Katholische Missionen", which he edited from 1880 to 1890.

From Spillmann's "Beilagen für die Jugend" grew seventy portly volumes of the "Reisebilder", while twenty-one booklets, "Aus fernen Landen" owe their origin to the same source; those consisted of edifying illustrated stories for the young. His comprehensive "Geschichte der Katholikenverfolgung in England von 1535-1681" began with articles in the "Stimmen aus Maria-Laach", was continued in the supplements to this periodical, and was completed in five large volumes. For the calendar, the "Hausfreund", which was given up in 1881, Spillman wrote many stories; these were afterwards collected under the title "Wolken und Sonnenschein, eight pretty stories for the young", and have been frequently republished and translated into other languages.

Spillmann also wrote seven longer romances, the first (Die Wunderblume von Woxindon) appearing in 1893, and the last (Der schwarze Schuhmacher) ten years later; they are written in the styles of Walter Scott and Charles Dickens. An eighth romance was sketched, but a serious illness prevented its completion.

=== Additional works ===
- Lucius Flavus, an 1890 historical novel
