= Lucius Flavus =

1890 novel by Joseph Spillmann

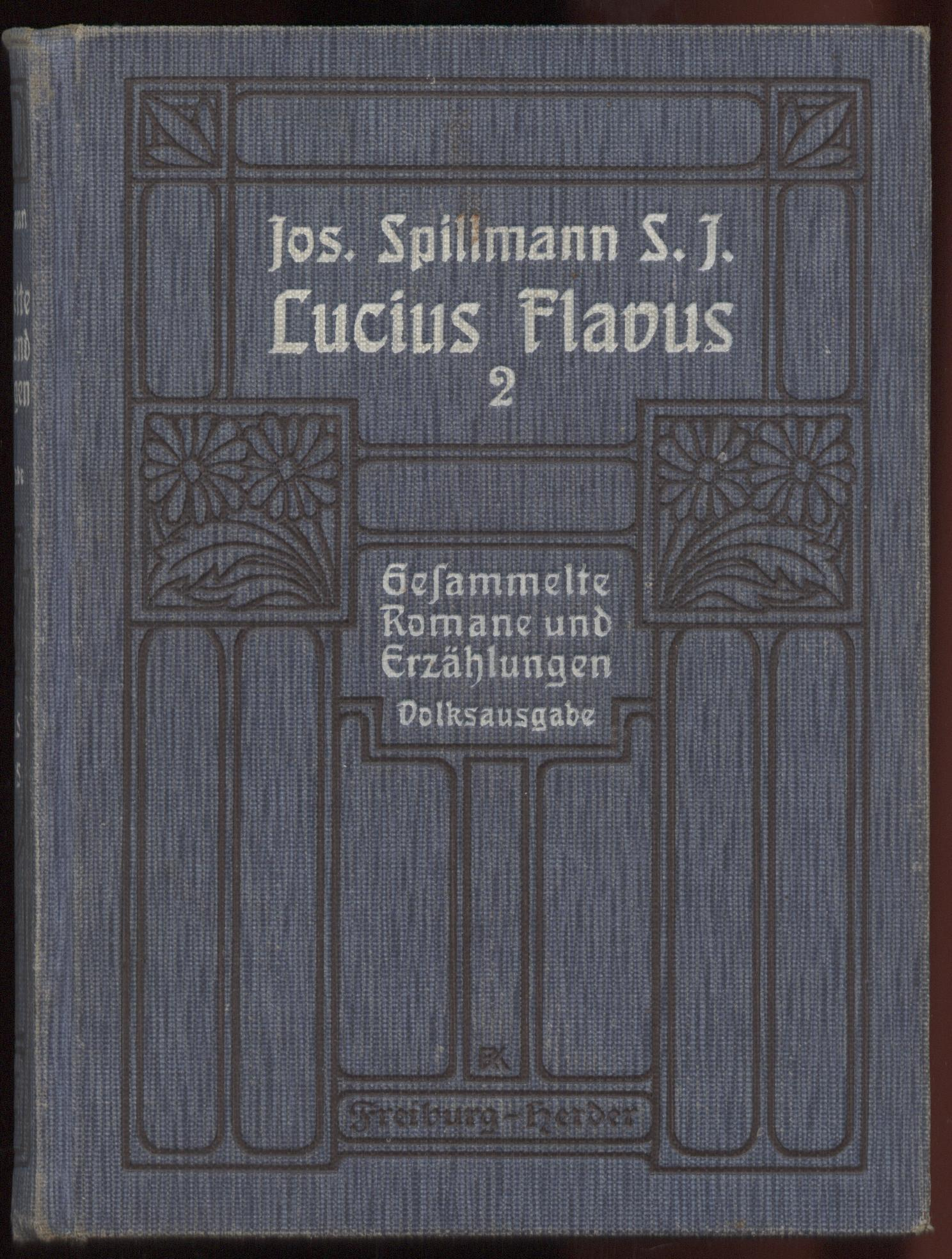
Book Cover-Joseph Spillmann S.J., Bucheinband, Jugendstil

Lucius Flavus (German: "Lucius Flavus - Historischer Roman aus den letzten Tagen Jerusalems") is one of the most famous historical novels by the Swiss writer and Roman Catholic priest Joseph Spillmann, first published in 1890 by Herder publishers in Freiburg, Germany. The Month likened the novel to Ben-Hur and Quo Vadis.

The novel has been translated into English and French. Reverend Peter Kaenders of Illinois adapted it to a five-act play in the early 1900s.

== Plot ==
The story of Lucius Flavus is based on a narrative by Josephus, set around the First Jewish-Roman War. Rabbi Ben Sadoc, a wealthy rabbi from Antioch, has a 16-year-old daughter, Thamar, and 8-year-old son. Ananus, the son of Caiaphas, invites the rabbi to Jerusalem, offering to marry Thamar to his son, Eleazar. He intends, however, to do away with the rabbi and possibly his son, to seize their fortune.

While traveling to Jerusalem, the rabbi and his family are attacked near Bethany by robber chieftain Ben Gioras, the leader of the Sicarii. While Gioras is working with Ananas, he also has a plot of his own. He leaves Sadoc for dead and prepares to kidnap his children, but a band of Roman soldiers, led by centurion Lucius Flavus, defeats the bandits and rescues Sadoc's daughter. They bring the rabbi and his family to a Christian family in Bethany, who takes them in.
