= Gerhard Schneemann =

Gerhard Schneemann (born at Wesel, Lower Rhine, 12 February 1829; d. at Kerkrade, Netherlands, 20 November 1885) was a German Jesuit.

== Life ==
After studying law for three years, he entered the seminary at Münster where he was ordained subdeacon in 1850. He became a member of the Society of Jesus, 24 November 1851, and was ordained priest on 22 December 1856.

For some years he taught philosophy at Bonn and Aachen, and subsequently lectured on church history and canon law in the Jesuit scholasticate at Maria Laach Abbey.

== Works ==
His first notable publication was "Studien über die Honoriusfrage" (Freiburg, 1864) against the opinion of Ignaz von Döllinger. Between the years 1865 and 1870, he contributed a number of dissertations to "Die Encyclica Papst Pius IX" and "Das öcumenische Concil", two series of papers that were published at Freiburg under the general title of Stimmen aus Maria-Laach, later called Stimmen der Zeit. In 1871 the Stimmen became a regular monthly review and for six years was edited by Schneemann.

He was the chief promoter in the collaboration and publication of the "Acta et decreta sacrorum conciliorum recentiorum", commonly called "Collection Lacensis", and died while preparing the documents of the First Vatican Council for the seventh and last volume. After his death, Theodor Granderath was sent to the college of the Society at Exaeten to continue his work in the preparation of the Acta; this was completed in 1890.

His work "Controfersiarum de divinae gratiae liberique arbitrii concordia initia et progressus" (Freiburg, 1881), was the occasion of a renewed controversy on the nature of grace and free will.

=== Published works ===
His works include;

- Die Irrthumer uber die Ehe;
- Die Freiheit und Unabhangigkeit der Kirche;
- Die kirchliche Gewalt und ihre Trager;
- Die kirchliche Lehrgewalt (published as essays in Stimmen aus Maria-Laach, Freiburg, 1866-69):
- Sancti Irenaei de Ecclesiae Romanae Principatu Testimonium (1870):
- Die Kanones und Beschlusse des vaticanischen Concils (in German and Latin, 1871):
- Die Entstehung der Thomistisch-Molinistischen Controverse (1879):
- Controversiarum de Divinae Gratiae Liberique Arbitrii Concordia Initia et Progressus (1881):
- Weitere Entwickellng der Thomistisch-Molinistischen Controverse (1880). (B.P.)
