= Irish Ecclesiastical Record =

Irish Roman Catholic monthly journal (1864-1968)

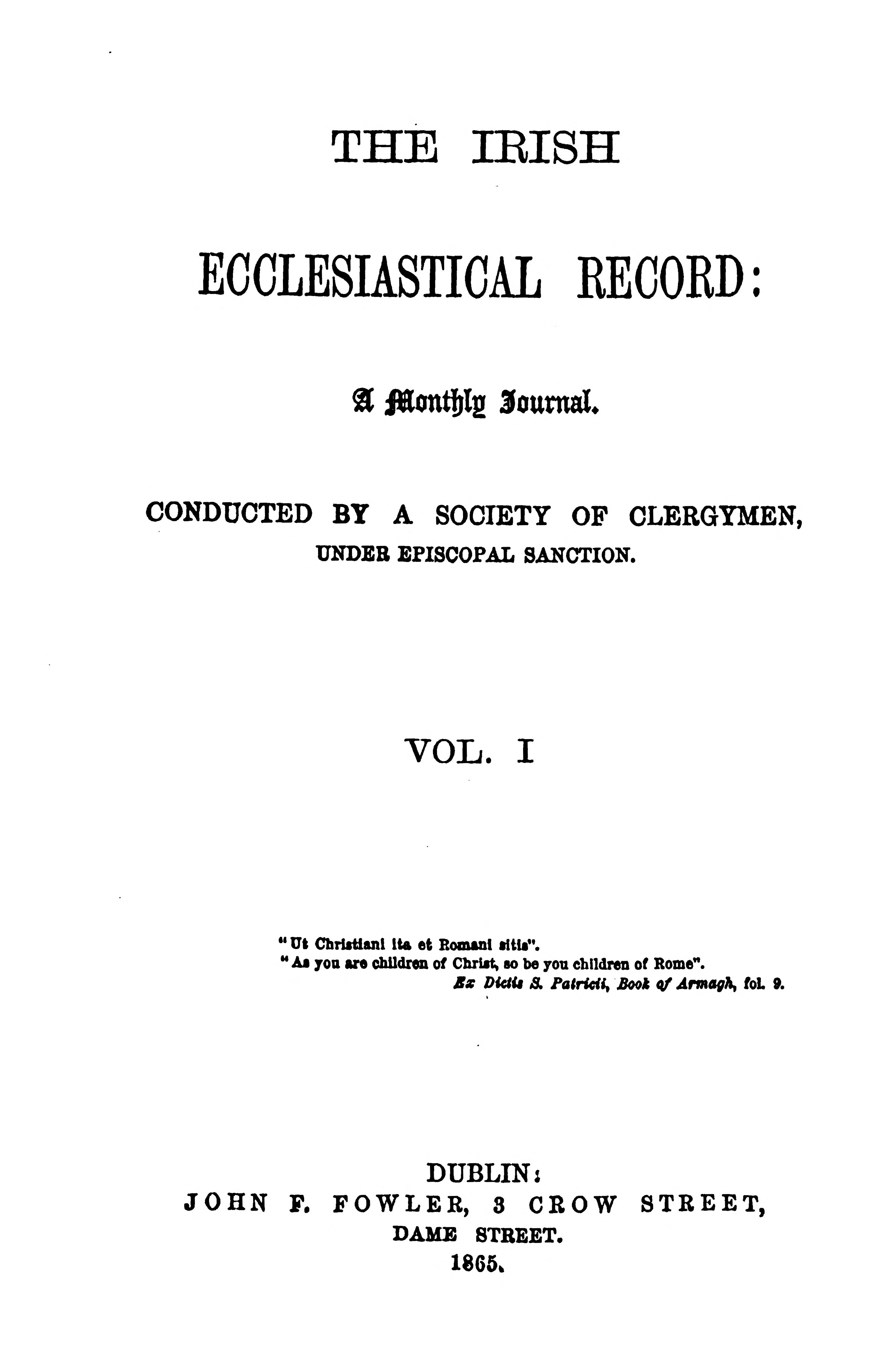
- Front cover of 1865 edition
- Discipline: Catholic theology, ecclesiastical affairs
- Language: English

Publication details
- History: 1864–1968
- Publisher: Browne and Nolan (Ireland)
- Frequency: Monthly
- ISO 4: Find out here

Indexing
- ISSN: 0790-8822
- OCLC no.: 1605447

Links
- Online archive at Internet Archive

The Irish Ecclesiastical Record was an Irish Roman Catholic monthly journal founded by Archbishop later Cardinal Paul Cullen in 1864. The Record contained articles on theology, liturgy, domestic and international church affairs, catholic social theory, literature, philosophy, history and Irish social and economic conditions. Seen as a bridge between Irish church and Roman church doctrines it reflected Cardinal Cullen's ultramontane policies. It was published under episcopal sanction, and published from Maynooth College from 1880.

Editors of The Record included Rev. Patrick Francis Moran (1864-1871), Rev. George Conroy (1864-1871), Rev. William Joseph Walsh (1876-1880), Rev. Thomas Joseph Carr (1880-1883), Rev. John Healy (1883), Rev. Robert Browne (1884-1892), Rev. John F. Hogan (1892-1913), Rev. Patrick McSweeney (1913-1935), Rev. Martin Brenan, Rev. Patrick Joseph Hamel (1948-1964), Rev. John McMakin (1964-1968), the last editor of the journal.

Contributors included Rev. Patrick Francis Moran, Rev. William Joseph Walsh, Rev. Robert Browne, Rev. Daniel Mannix, Rev. Patrick Augustine Sheehan, Rev. Bartholomew MacCarthy, Rev. Henry Dennehy, Rev. Walter McDonald (professor), Rev. Jeremiah Murphy, and Rev. William Hutch.

The Record ceased publication in December 1968.
