= Herman J. Heuser =

German-American priest (1852–1933)

Rev. Herman J. Heuser
- Undated photograph

Personal life
- Born: October 23, 1851 Potsdam, Prussia
- Died: August 22, 1933 (aged 80) Overbrook, Philadelphia, Pennsylvania, United States

Religious life
- Religion: Catholicism

Herman Joseph Heuser (c. October 23, 1852 – August 22, 1933) was a German-American Catholic priest, author, and educator.

== Biography ==
Herman Joseph Heuser was most likely born on October 23, 1851 (Note: Various dates between October 23, 1851 and October 23, 1852 have been given for Heuser's birth. Hubbert (1992) judges October 23, 1851 to be the most probable.) in Potsdam, Prussia as the first child of Catholic German couple Herman Joseph and Julia Heuser (née Neese). Herman junior received his education in Berlin and then in Breslau (modern-day Wrocław). He immigrated to the United States in 1868 at the age of sixteen to join his family there. Ordained as a priest on February 2, 1876, Heuser would go on to found the American Ecclesiastical Review in 1899. Heuser died on August 22, 1933, in Overbrook, Philadelphia.

== Archival ==
The Philadelphia Archdiocesan Historical Research Center holds records relating to the correspondence between him and prominent figures in the Catholic Church, including Cardinal James Gibbons, and Archbishop Patrick Ryan of Philadelphia, Mother Katharine Drexel, Thomas C. Middleton, O.S.A. With these are conserved letters from other noted persons: Oliver Wendell Holmes Jr., Princess Catherine Radziwiłł, Leopold Stokowski, etc. The "lot" includes archival materials dealing with publication of the book My New Curate by the Irish author Canon Patrick Augustine Sheehan, and also has papers deriving from Heuser's work with the American Ecclesiastical Review and the Dolphin Magazine.
