= Theodor Granderath =

German Jesuit scholar

Theodor Granderath (19 June 1839, Giesenkirchen, Rhine Province – 19 March 1902, Valkenburg, Netherlands) was a German Jesuit scholar.

== Life ==
After completing the course in the gymnasium at Neuss, he studied theology in the University of Tübingen, and entered the Society of Jesus at Münster, Westphalia (3 April 1860). Between 1862 and 1874 he finished his studies in the classics, philosophy, theology, and canon law.

In 1874 he was appointed professor of canon law in the college of Ditton Hall, England, where from 1876 to 1887 he taught dogma and apologetics. In 1887 he was sent to the college of the Society at Exaeten, Netherlands, to succeed Gerhard Schneemann in the preparation of the Acta et Decreta Concilii Vaticani. This was completed in 1890.

In 1893 he was called to Rome, where Pope Leo XIII placed the archives of the First Vatican Council at his disposal, with a view to a history of that council. In 1897 and 1898 he replaced the professor of apologetics at the Gregorian University. In 1901 failing health compelled him to retire to the college at Valkenburg, where he prepared the first two volumes of his history of the Vatican Council.

== Works ==
In preparation for his work on the Vatican Council he first edited the Acta et Decreta sacrosancti oecumenici Concilii Vaticani (Freiburg im Br., 1890), the seventh volume of the Acta et Decreta sacrorum Conciliorum recentiorum in the Collectio Lacensis. This was followed by the Constitutiones dogmaticae s. oecumenici Concilii Vaticani ex ipsis ejus actis explicatae atque illustratae (Freiburg im Br., 1892).

He also wrote and prepared the three-volume work Geschichte des vaticanischen Koncils von seiner ersten Ankundigung bis zu seiner Vertagung, nach den authentischen Dokumenten dargestellt. After his death, the Geschichte was continued by his fellow Jesuit Konrad Kirch. Two volumes of this work, which the author himself prepared for the press, were issued in 1903 at Freiburg im Breisgau, the first dealing with the preliminary history and the second with the proceedings of the council to the end of the third public session. The third and last volume was published in 1906 and treats of the final proceedings. The unabridged text of the acts of the council, especially of the discourses delivered in the general congregations, was laid before the public.

Granderath was also the author of many apologetic, dogmatic, and historical articles in the Stimmen aus Maria-Laach (1874–99), the Zeitschrift für katholische Theologie (1881–86), and the Katholik (1898). The second edition of the Kirchenlexikon contains several lengthy articles by him, among others that on the Vatican Council (XII, 607-33).

== Notes ==
Attribution
