= Maria Laach Abbey =

Benedictine abbey situated in Glees, Germany

Coordinates: 50°24′08″N 7°15′08″E

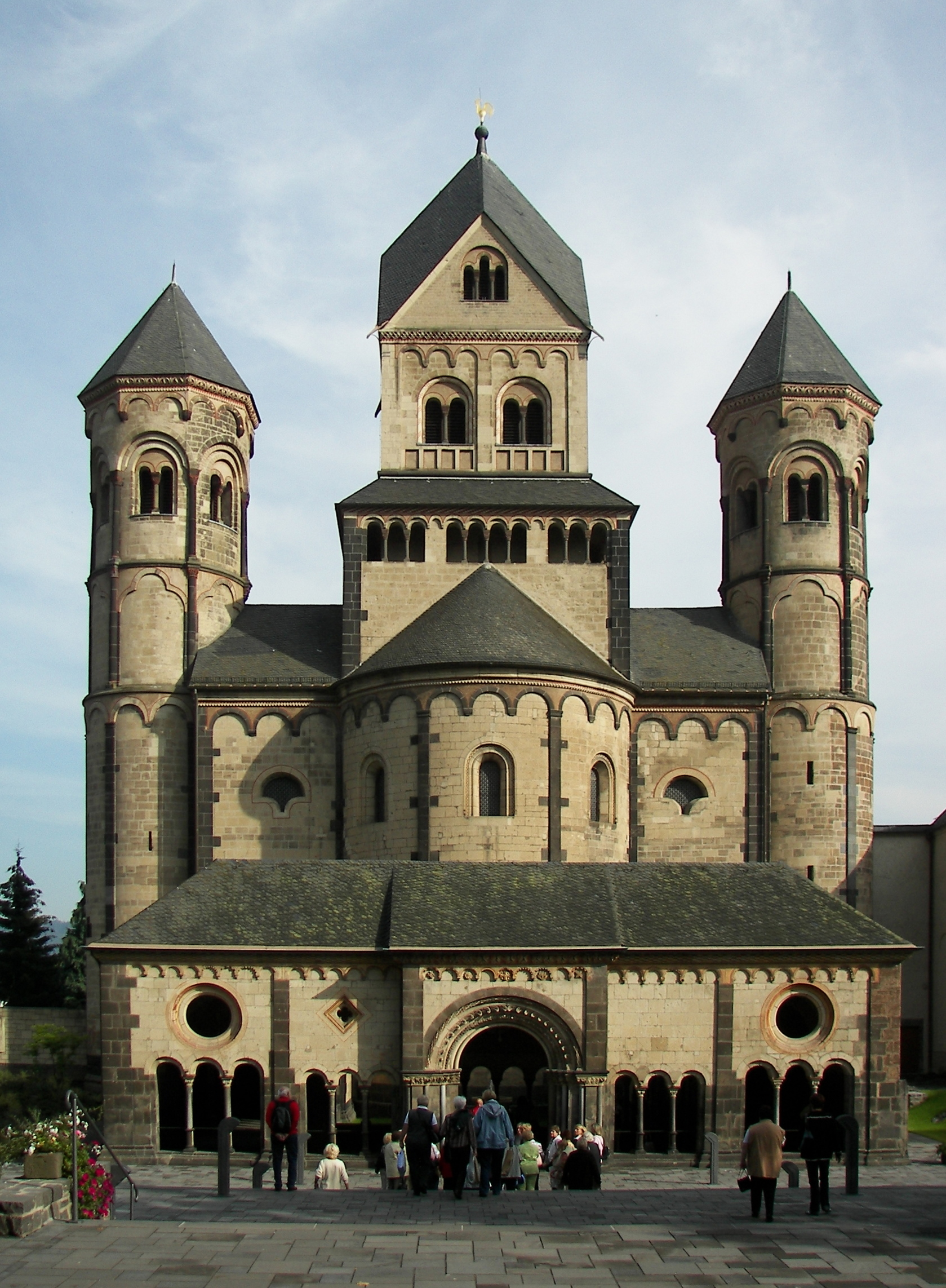
Maria Laach Abbey, the west end with the paradisium, a narthex enclosing a garden.

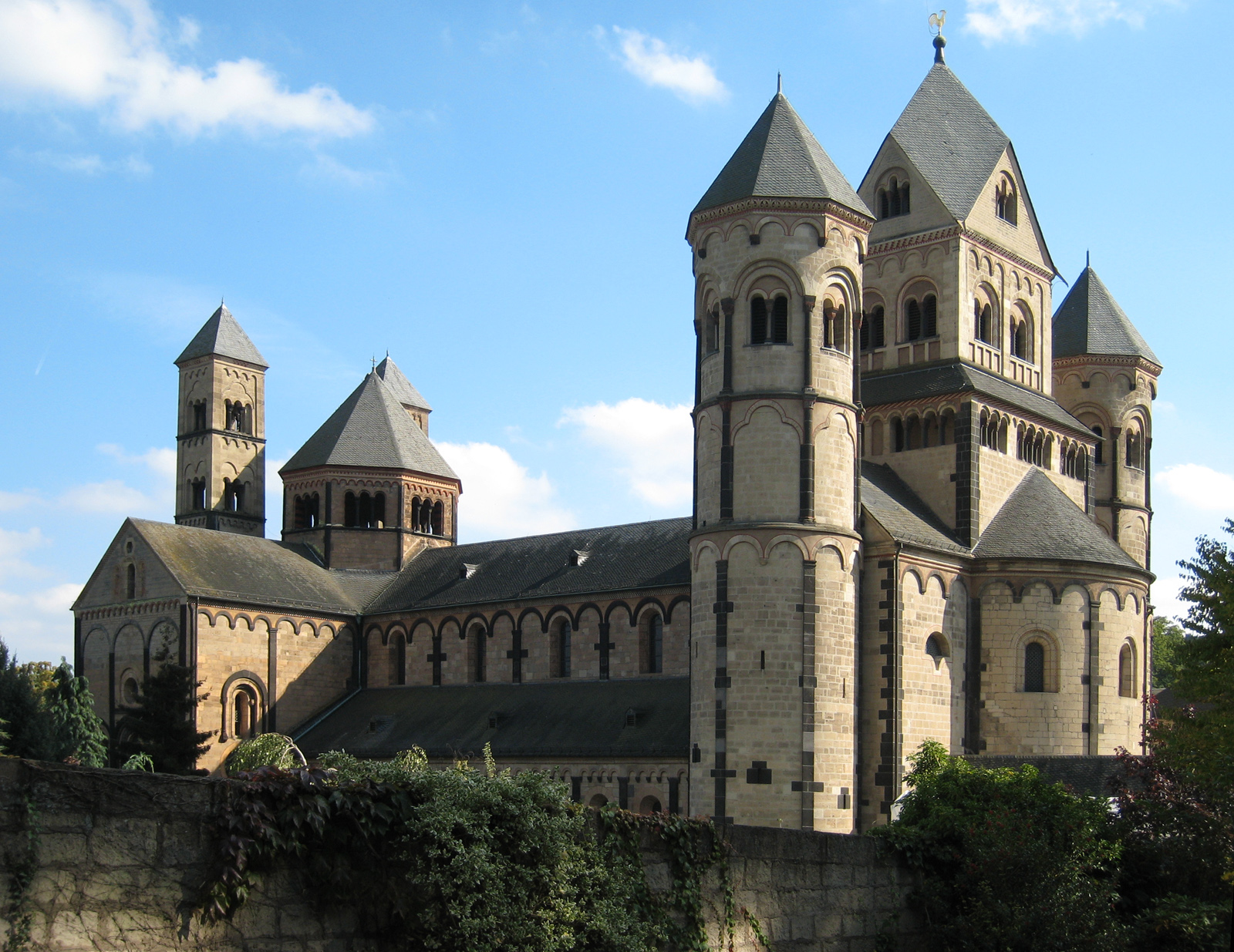
Maria Laach Abbey, seen from north west

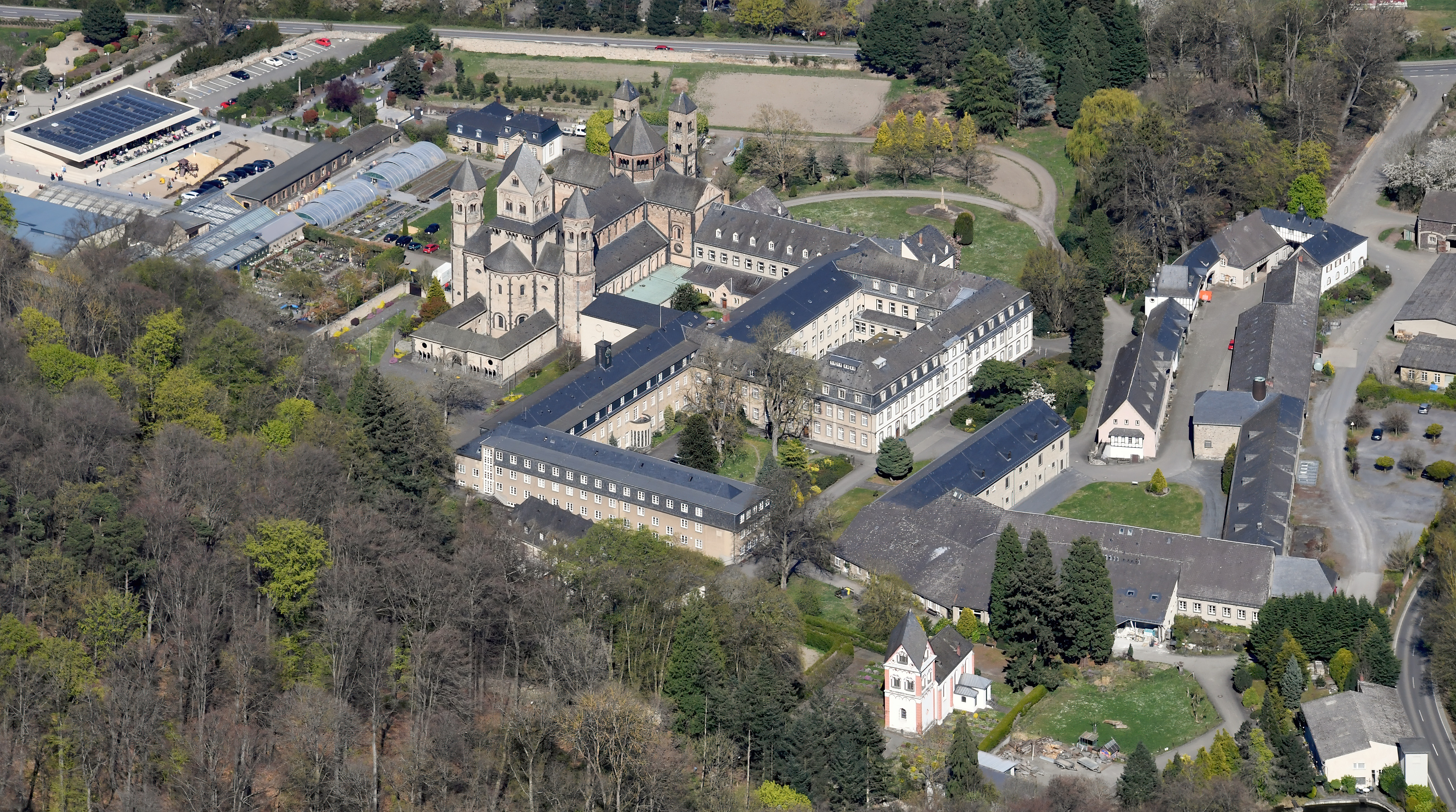
Aerial view of the abbey

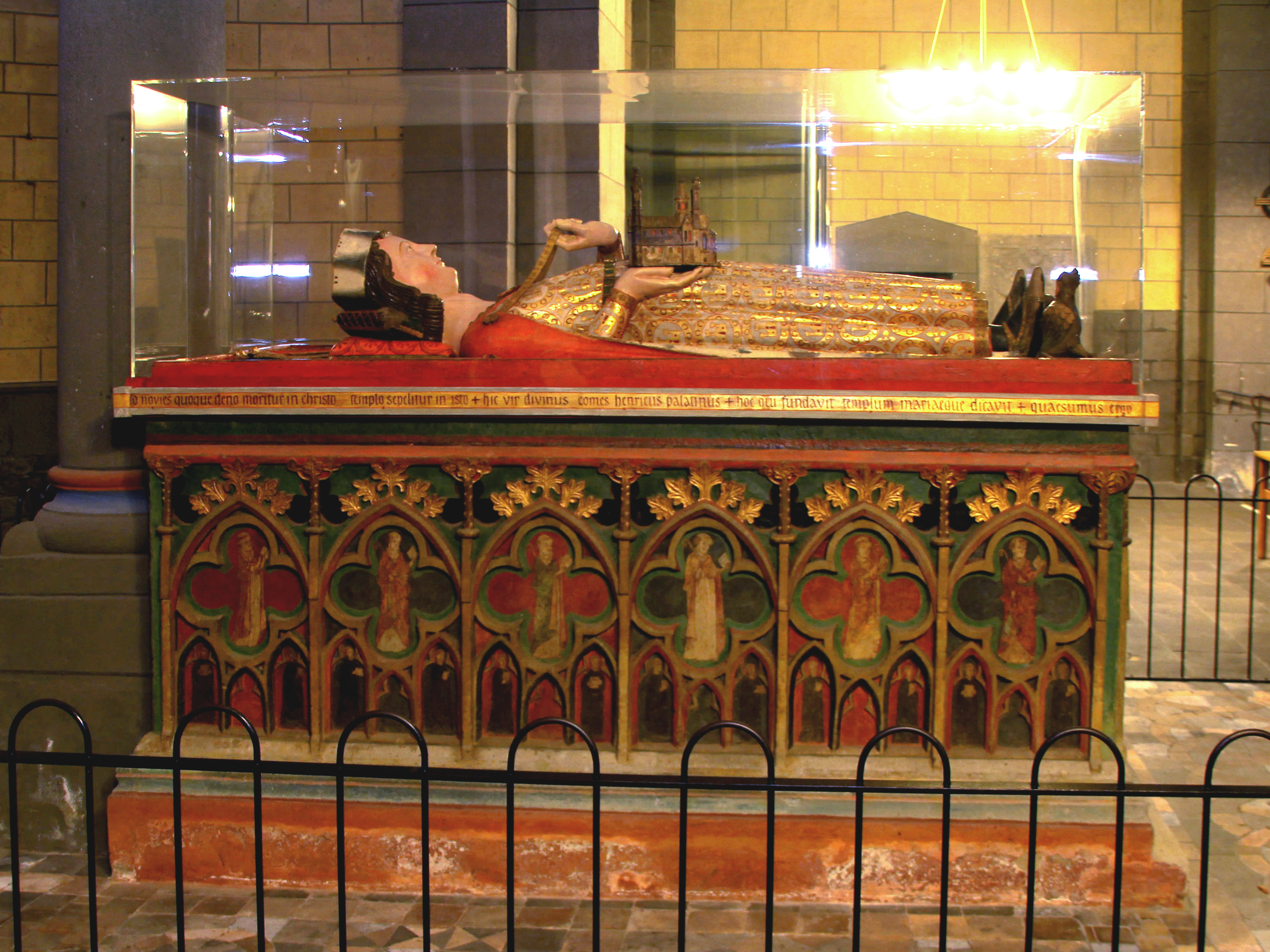
Tomb of Henry of Laach at Maria Laach Abbey

Maria Laach Abbey (in German: Abtei Maria Laach, in Latin: Abbatia Maria Lacensis or Abbatia Maria ad Lacum) is a Benedictine abbey situated in Glees, on the southwestern shore of the Laacher See (Lake Laach), in the Eifel region of the Rhineland-Palatinate in Germany. It is a member of the Beuronese Congregation within the Benedictine Confederation. The abbey was built in the 11th-12th centuries and was originally known as "Abtei Laach" ("Abbatia Lacensis" or "Laach Abbey", meaning the "Lake Abbey") until 1862 when the Jesuits added the name "Maria".

== First Benedictine foundation ==
Founded in 1093 as a priory of Affligem Abbey (in modern Belgium) by the first Count Palatine of the Rhine Heinrich II von Laach and his wife Adelaide of Weimar-Orlamünde, widow of Hermann II of Lotharingia, Laach became an independent house in 1127, under its first abbot, Gilbert. Affligem itself had been founded by Hermann. Although the abbey was founded by a prominent (although perennially excommunicated) member of the imperial party (Investiture Controversy), Affligem became soon after a prominent member of the Cluniac reform movement.

The abbey developed as a centre of study during the 12th century. The 13th-century abbots Albert (1199–1217) and Theoderich II (1256–1295) added significantly to the buildings and architectural decoration, including the monumental tomb of the founder.

In common with most other German Benedictine houses, Laach declined during the 14th century in terms of its spiritual and monastic life, a tendency which was reversed only in the late 15th century, under the influence of the reforming Bursfelde Congregation, which the abbey joined, supported against a certain resistance within the abbey by Abbot Johannes V von Deidesheim (1469–1491).

The consequent improvement in discipline led to a fruitful literary period in the abbey's history, prominent in which were Jakob Siberti, Tilman of Bonn and Benedict of Munstereifel, but principally Prior Johannes Butzbach (d. 1526). Although much of his work, both published and unpublished, survives, his chronicle of the abbey is unfortunately lost.

== Secularisation and the Jesuits ==
Laach Abbey was dissolved in the secularisation of 1802. The premises became the property, first of the occupying French, and then in 1815 of the Prussian State.

In 1820 the buildings were acquired by the Society of Jesus, who established a place of study and scholarship here. Of particular note were Fathers Gerhard Schneemann, Theodor Granderath and Florian Reiss, who produced a number of important works: the "Collectio lacensis" ("Acta et decreta sacrorum conciliorum recentiorum", 7 volumes, Freiburg, 1870–1890); the "Philosophia lacensis", a collection of learned books on the different branches of philosophy (logic, cosmology, psychology, theodicy, natural law) and published at Freiburg, 1880–1900; and, perhaps best-known, the "Stimmen aus Maria-Laach" ("Voices from Maria Laach"), appearing from 1865, at first as individual pamphlets defending against liberalism within the Roman Catholic church, and from 1871 as a regular periodical. The Jesuits were obliged to leave during the "Kulturkampf" of the 1870s.

== Second Benedictine foundation ==
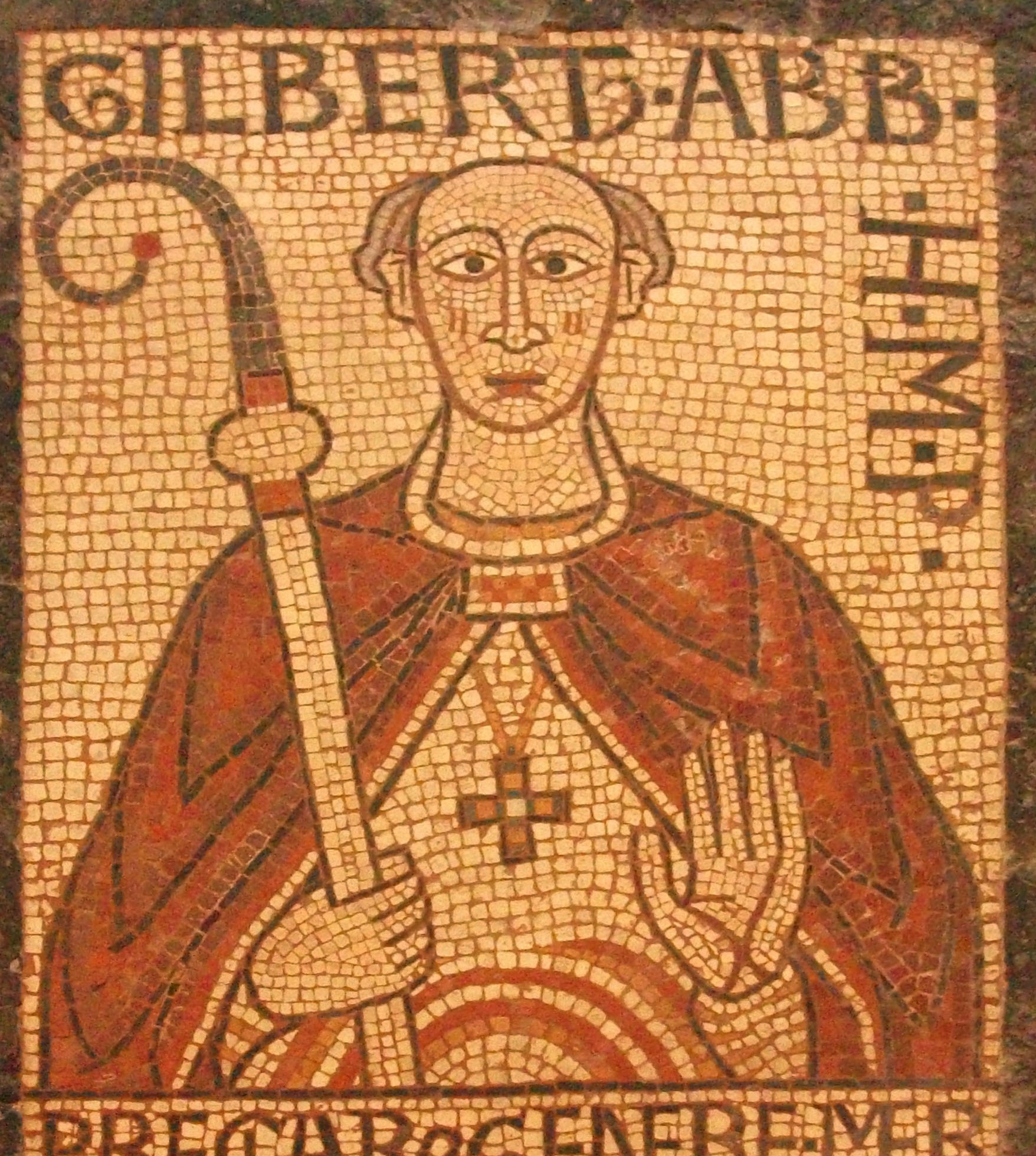
Funeral mosaic of Abbot Gilbert from the abbey, dating to the second half of the 12th century. It is preserved in Bonn.

The Benedictines of the Beuronese Congregation moved into the monastery in 1892, and it was raised into an abbey the following year. The restoration of the church, at that time still the property of Prussia, was inaugurated by Kaiser Wilhelm II in 1897.

In the first half of the twentieth century Maria Laach played a leading role in the Liturgical Movement.

The abbey structure dates from between 1093 and 1177, with a paradisium added around 1225 and is considered a prime example of Romanesque architecture of the Staufen period. Despite its long construction time the well-preserved basilica with its six towers is considered to be one of the most beautiful Romanesque buildings in Germany.

Due to a considerable reduction of the lake level in the early 19th century, serious and unexpected structural damages to the church vaults and roofs were detected. Three important renovation campaigns took place - the first in the 1830s to repair the structural damages including the removal of the paradisium's upper storey (it had an upper storey at that time for accommodation facilities), the second in the 1880s including repairs after a serious fire in the southern round tower in 1885, and the third in the 1930s. Many former changes to the buildings carried out in Gothic (e.g. steep tower roofs) and Baroque style (e.g. wider windows) have been re-altered to Romanesque style.

== Controversial relations with the Nazi regime ==
The Maria Laach Abbey has been at the center of a controversy over its relations with the Nazi regime between 1933 and 1945. In particular, Heinrich Böll depicted (in Billiards at Half-past Nine) a Benedictine monastery whose monks actively and voluntarily collaborated with the Nazis, and is generally considered to have had Maria Laach in mind.

In 2004 researcher Marcel Albert published a work (translated under the title "The Maria Laach Benedictine Abbey and National Socialism"). The book was reviewed by Dr. Mark Edward Ruff of Saint Louis University, who stresses the centrality of Maria Laach in Catholic conservatism during the Weimar Republic, and its unique relationship (even among Benedictine monasteries) with the Nazis.

In its closing chapters, the book shows that the abbey cultivated a positive relationship to Adenauer and the CDU after 1945, but retained its monarchist beliefs. However, the post-war parts of the book are less extensive, and this part of the monastery's history seems to await further research.

== Basilius Ebel ==
Born Henri Ebel in 1896 as son of a wine-producing family from Alsace, and later a significant scholar of his times, Dr. Basilius Ebel became abbot of St. Matthias' Abbey in Trier in 1939 and provided a sanctuary to Jews whom he admitted among the monks. In 1941, his abbey was confiscated by the Gestapo and he himself was exiled to Maria Laach where he became abbot from 1946 to 1966. Under his leadership, Maria Laach became an important centre of reconciliation between Christians and Jews.

On the scholarly side, he should be remembered for publishing a 12th-century Alemannic hymnal and for the restoration of the Maria Laach basilica to its original style.

== Notable features ==
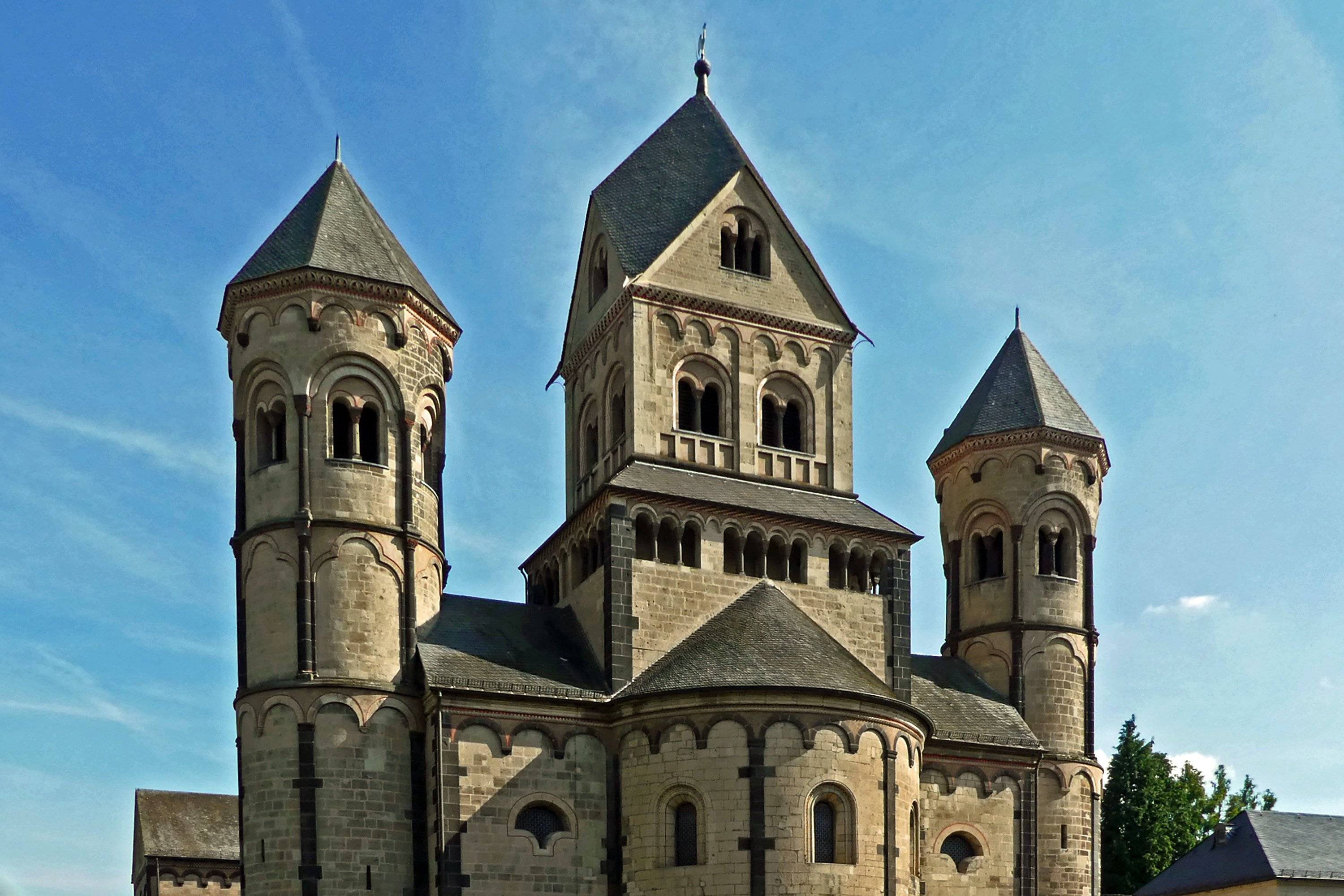
The western building of Maria Laach

The abbey church of Maria Laach is considered a masterpiece of German Romanesque architecture, with its multiple towers, large westwork with arcaded gallery, and unique west porch.

The east end has a round apse flanked by twin square towers. Over the transept crossing is a broad cupola with cone-shaped roof. The monumental west façade includes a west choir with apse flanked by round twin towers and a square central tower.

The Paradise, a single-story, colonnaded west porch surrounding a small courtyard, was added in about 1225. It recalls the architecture of Early Christian basilicas. Its capitals are richly carved with human and mythical figures. The imaginative mason is known as the Laacher Samson-Meister or "Master of the Laach Samson", whose carvings are also found in Cologne and elsewhere. The Lion Fountain in the courtyard was added in 1928.

Notable features of the interior include the tomb of the founder Pfalzgraf Heinrich II (dating from 1270), 16th-century murals, a Late Romanesque baldachino in the apse, and interesting modern decorations such as mosaics from c. 1910 and stained glass windows from the 1950s. The mosaics are based on those present in the Sicilian cathedrals of Cefalu and Monreale.

== See also ==
- List of Christian monasteries in Rhineland-Palatinate
- List of Christian monasteries in Germany
