= Georg Michael Pachtler =

German Jesuit and writer (1825–1889)

Georg Michael Pachtler (14 September 1825, at Mergentheim, Württemberg – 12 August 1889, at Exaten, Netherlands) was a German Jesuit and educational writer.

== Life ==
He studied at the University of Tübingen and was ordained priest in 1848; he then took a course of philology at the Ludwig-Maximilians-Universität München (LMU) and became professor in the Gymnasium at Ellwangen.

In 1856 Pachtler entered the Society of Jesus, and some years later was appointed professor in the Jesuit College of Feldkirch, Austria. His educational labours were interrupted twice, when he acted as military chaplain to the Tyrolese troops during the Italian campaign (1866), and to German volunteers in the papal army (1869–70).

After the expulsion of the Society of Jesus from the German Empire (1872), Pachtler lived mostly in the Netherlands and Austria, devoting himself to literary work.

== Works ==
He was the first editor of the Stimmen aus Maria-Laach, published by the German Jesuits, one of the leading Catholic periodicals in Germany. He was a prolific writer on questions of the day: the First Vatican Council, the Roman question, the labour movement, Freemasonry, and Liberalism. He accused the Freemasons of trying to destroy Christianity, and inciting the Kulturkampf.

Among his works are:

- Acta et Decreta Sacrosancti et Oecumenici Concilii Vaticani (1871)
- Die Internationale Arbeiterverbindung (1871)
- Der Götze der Humanität oder das Positive der Freimaurerei (1875)
- Der stille Krieg gegen Thron und Altar, oder das Negative der Freimaurerei (1873)
- Der Europäische Militarismus (1876)
- Die Geistige Knechtung der Völker durch das Schulmonopol des modernen Staates (1876)
- Das göttliche Recht der Familie und der Kirche auf die Schule (1879)

His book on the reform of higher education, Die Reform unserer Gymnasien (1883), attracted the attention of German educationists, and he was invited to become a contributor to the Monumenta Germaniae Paedagogica, published in Berlin under the editorship of Karl Kehrbach. He contributed four volumes (II, V, IX, and XVI of the series, 1887–94), the last being edited by Bernhard Duhr, after the author's death. Pachtler's volumes form the standard work on the educational system of the Jesuits; it is entitled: Ratio Studiorum et Institutiones Scholasticae Societatis Jesu, per Germaniam olim Vigentes. The work contains the official documents of the society which have reference to education, parts of the constitutions, decrees of the legislative assemblies of the order, ordinances of generals, reports of official visitations, the various revisions of the Ratio Studiorum, schedules of study, disciplinary regulations, directions for the training of teachers, and treatises of private individuals which explain the practical working of the system. Much of the material had never been published before.
