= Blunden =

Blunden is a surname. Notable people with the surname include:

- Alice Blunden (died 1674), the subject of a notorious account of premature burial
- Andy Blunden (born 1945), Australian writer and Marxist philosopher
- Anna Blunden (1829–1915), English pre-Raphaelite artist
- Arthur Blunden (1906–1984), English cricketer
- Bill Blunden, British television and film editor
- Bill Blunden (author), non-fiction writer
- Edmund Blunden (1896–1974), English poet, author and critic
- Godfrey Blunden (1906–1996), Australian journalist and author
- Jeraldyne Blunden (1940–1999), American choreographer
- John Blunden (politician) (1695–1752), Irish politician
- Sir John Blunden, 1st Baronet (1718–1783), Irish baronet and politician
- Mike Blunden (born 1986), Canadian ice hockey player
- Peter Blunden, Australian publisher

== See also ==
- Blunden baronets of Castle Blunden in the County of Kilkenny, a title in the Baronetage of Ireland
- Blunden Harbour, British Columbia, small harbour and native Indian reserve in British Columbia, Canada
- The Amazing Mr Blunden, 1972 British film based on the novel The Ghosts by Antonia Barber
- Blindern
- Blundell
- Blunder (disambiguation)
- Blundy
- Blunsdon
