= John Blunden =

John Blunden may refer to:

- John Blunden (politician) (c. 1695–1752), Irish MP for Kilkenny City 1727–1752
- Sir John Blunden, 1st Baronet (c. 1718–1783), Irish MP for Kilkenny City 1761–1776
- Sir John Blunden, 2nd Baronet (1767–1818), of the Blunden baronets
- Sir John Blunden, 3rd Baronet (1814–1890), of the Blunden baronets
- Sir John Blunden, 5th Baronet (1880–1923), of the Blunden baronets

== See also ==
- Blunden
