= De Montmorency baronets =

Extinct baronetcy in the Baronetage of Ireland

Arms of Morres, which would be eventually exchanged for those of Montmorency

There have been two baronetcies created for members of the Morres, later de Montmorency family, both in the Baronetage of Ireland. Both creations are extinct.

The Morres, later de Montmorency Baronetcy, of Knockagh in the County of Tipperary, was created in the Baronetage of Ireland on 28 March 1631 for John Morres. For more information on this creation, see Viscount Mountmorres.

The Morres, later de Montmorency Baronetcy, of Upper Wood in the County of Kilkenny, was created in the Baronetage of Ireland on 24 April 1758 for William Morres, who represented County Kilkenny and Newtownards in the Irish House of Commons. He was the grandson of Hervey Morres, younger son of the second Baronet of the 1631 creation, as well as the brother of Hervey Morres, 1st Viscount Mountmorres and the uncle of Lodge de Montmorency, 1st Viscount Frankfort de Montmorency. His son from his first marriage, the second Baronet, was a member of the Irish Parliament for Kilkenny. The latter was childless and was succeeded by his half-brother, the third Baronet. He represented Newtownards in the Irish House of Commons. In 1815 he assumed by Royal licence the surname of de Montmorency in lieu of Morres. He never married and the title became extinct on his death in 1829.

== Morres, later de Montmorency baronets, of Knockagh (1631) ==
- see Viscount Mountmorres

== Morres, later de Montmorency baronets, of Upper Wood (1758) ==
- Sir William Evans Morres, 1st Baronet (1710–1774)
- Sir Haydock Evans Morres, 2nd Baronet (1743–1776)
- Sir William Evans Ryves de Montmorency, 3rd Baronet (1763–1829)

== See also ==
- Viscount Mountmorres
- Viscount Frankfort de Montmorency
