= Viscount Frankfort de Montmorency =

Raymond de Montmorency, eldest son of the third Viscount Frankfort de Montmorency

Viscount Frankfort de Montmorency, of Galmoye in the County of Kilkenny, was a title in the Peerage of Ireland. It was created on 22 January 1816 for Lodge de Montmorency, 1st Baron Frankfort, who had earlier represented Bandon Bridge, Dingle, Inistioge and Ennis in the Irish House of Commons. He had already been made Baron Frankfort, of Galmoye in the County of Kilkenny, on 31 July 1800, also in the Peerage of Ireland. Born Lodge Evans Morres, he assumed in 1815 by Royal licence the surname of de Montmorency in lieu of Morres. However, the French House of de Montmorency never recognised his claim to be a member of that house. His grandson, the third Viscount, was a Major-General in the British Army and sat in the House of Lords as an Irish representative peer between 1900 and 1902. The latter's eldest son, the Honourable Raymond de Montmorency, was awarded the Victoria Cross for his actions at the Battle of Omdurman in 1898. He was killed in action in the Second Boer War two years later, predeceasing his father by two years. The third Viscount was succeeded by his second and only surviving son, the fourth Viscount. He was also a soldier. He died childless in 1917 when the titles became extinct.

Redmond Morres (also known as Reymond Morres), father of the first Viscount, was a member of the Irish Parliament for Thomastown, Newtownards and Dublin. Hervey Morres, great-grandfather of the first Viscount, represented Knocktopher in the Irish House of Commons. The latter was a younger son of Sir Redmond Morres, 2nd Baronet, of Knockagh (see De Montmorency baronets). William Morres, uncle of the first Viscount, was created a baronet in 1758 (see De Montmorency baronets). Hervey Morres, uncle of the first Viscount, was created Viscount Mountmorres in 1763) (see this title for more information).

== Viscounts Frankfort de Montmorency (1816) ==
- Lodge Evans de Montmorency, 1st Viscount Frankfort (1747–1822)
- Lodge Raymond de Montmorency, 2nd Viscount Frankfort (1806–1889)
- Raymond Harvey de Montmorency, 3rd Viscount Frankfort (1835–1902)
  - Hon. Raymond Harvey Lodge Joseph de Montmorency (1867–1900)
- Willoughby John Horace de Montmorency, 4th Viscount Frankfort (1868–1917)

Coat of arms of Viscount Frankfort de Montmorency
Crest A peacock in its pride Proper. Escutcheon Argent a cross Gules between four eagles displayed Sable a crescent for difference. Supporters Two angels Proper hair and wings Or vested Argent. Motto Dieu Ayde

== See also ==
- De Montmorency baronets
- Viscount Mountmorres
