= Hervey Redmond Morres, 2nd Viscount Mountmorres =

Irish politician and writer (c. 1743 – 1797)

Hervey Redmond Morres
- Viscount Mountmorres
- Tenure: 1766–1797
- Predecessor: Hervey Morres, 1st Viscount Mountmorres
- Successor: Francis Hervey de Montmorency, 3rd Viscount Mountmorres
- Born: c. 1743
- Died: 17 or 18 August 1797; London
- Father: Hervey Morres, 1st Viscount Mountmorres
- Mother: Letitia Ponsonby

Hervey Redmond Morres, 2nd Viscount of Mountmorres (c. 1743 – 1797) was an Anglo-Irish politician and writer.

== Birth and origins ==
Family tree

Hervey Redmond Morres with parents and other selected relatives. (Note: This family tree is based on written genealogies of the Viscounts Mountmorres.) He never married.

Brabazon; Ponsonby; 1st Earl; Bessborough; 1679–1757	Francis; Morres	Catherine; Evans
Letitia; Ponsonby d. 1754	Hervey; 1st Viscount; Mountmorres d. 1766	Mary; Wall d. 1779
Hervey; Redmond; 2nd Viscount c. 1743 – 1797	Francis; Hervey de Montmorency; 3rd Viscount; 1756–1833	Anne; Reade d. 1823
Hervey de Montmorency; 4th Viscount; 1790–1872	Sarah; Shaw d. 1877

Legend

XXX	Subject of the article	XXX	Viscounts; Mountmorres	XXX	Earls of Bessborough

Hervey Redmond was born about 1743, (Note: The time of his birth is given as about 1746, 1741/2, or about 1743.) the only son of Hervey Morres and his first wife, Letitia Ponsonby. His father was a commoner at the time but would be created Baron Mountmorres in 1756 and Viscount Mountmorres in 1763. His mother was the youngest daughter of Brabazon Ponsonby, 1st Earl of Bessborough. His parents had married in 1742. His family was part of the Protestant Ascendancy.

== Early life ==
Hervey Redmond's mother died in 1754. He and his two sisters, Letitia and Sarah, were his father's children from his first marriage. His father remarried in 1755. In May 1756, his father was created Baron Mountmorres. Hervey Redmond's half-brother Francis Hervey was born in September. Hervey Redmond immatriculated at Christ Church, Oxford in April 1763. In June, his father was advanced to viscount.

== Viscount ==
In April 1766 while still studying at Oxford, Hervey Redmond succeeded his father as second viscount. Mountmorres, as he now was, obtained his M.A. in July. He took his seat in the Irish House of Lords on 20 October 1767 in the first Irish parliament of George III, which had been convened in 1761. Parliament had met since the early 1730s in its new Parliament House, on College Green, Dublin.

His uncle John Ponsonby was speaker in the house of commons during this parliament. A new Lord Lieutenant, Viscount Townshend was appointed in August 1767 and arrived in Dublin in October The Octennial Act 1767 was passed in February 1768. It limited the duration of parliaments to eight years, leading to more frequent general elections. Irish regiments had been reduced to cadre staff during peace time whereas British regiments had retained their full strength. This made it difficult to run a rotation system. The British government asked Townshend to pass a bill to increase the Irish regiments to the same strength as the British ones.

That "augmentation bill" was costly and therefore unpopular. The Irish asked at least for a guarantee that at least 12,000 of these troops would be always present in Ireland. This guarantee was refused and the bill was rejected by the Irish Commons in April. Parliament was dissolved in May. The second Irish parliament of George III opened in October 1769. The augmentation bill was tabled again but with a security clause and passed in December. Mountmorres graduated as a Doctor of Civil Law in 1773. Parliament was dissolved in April 1776.

Mountmorres joined the patriots and was a supporter of Lord Charlemont. In 1774, Mountmorres stood for election as MP for Westminster in the British house of commons but was defeated. Moving to France in the years that followed, Mountmorres returned in 1784 to take his seat in the Lords.

Flag of the Kingdom of Ireland 1542–1801

== Family Baronetcy ==
In 1795, by the death of Nicholas Morres, a distant cousin, Mountmorres became the 10th baronet Morres of Knockagh, County Tipperary, an honour that had been created in 1631 for John Morres, one of his ancestors. This became a subsidiary title running with the viscountcy.

== Death and timeline ==
Mountmorres died on 17 or 18 August 1797 in his London home at 6 York Street, Westminster. This street, now known as Duke of York Street, runs from St James's Square to Jermyn Street. Mountmorres committed suicide by shooting himself through the head. As he had never married, he was succeeded by his half-brother Francis Hervey. However, his two full sisters inherited his lands as stipulated in his will.

Timeline
As his birth date is uncertain, so are all his ages. Italics for historical background.
Age	Date	Event
0	About 1743	Born
10–11	9 Feb 1754	Mother died
11–12	July 1755	Father remarried to Mary Wall, widow of John Baldwin
12–13	4 May 1756	Father created Baron Mountmorres
16–17	25 Oct 1760	Accession of George III, succeeding George II
19–20	29 June 1763	Father created Viscount Mountmorres
22–23	6 Apr 1766	Succeeded as 2nd Viscount
22–23	3 Jul 1766	Obtained an MA at Christ Church, Oxford
23–24	19 Aug 1767	George Townshend, 1st Marquess Townshend appointed Lord Lieutenant of Ireland
29–30	8 Jul 1773	Obtained a DCL at Christ Church, Oxford
30–31	1774	Contested an election for Westminster but lost
32–33	4 Jul 1776	United States Declaration of Independence
35–36	Sep 1779	Stepmother died.
41–42	1785	Attended the house of Lords in the uniform of the Irish Volunteers
45–46	14 Jul 1789	French Revolution: the storming of the Bastille
48–49	1792	Published The History of the Principal Transactions ...
51–52	1795	Inherited a family baronetcy from a distant cousin
53–54	17 or 18 Aug 1797	Died by suicide

== See also ==
- List of acts of the Parliament of Ireland
- List of parliaments of Ireland

== Notes and references ==
=== Sources ===
- Bartlett, Thomas (1981). "The Augmentation of the Army in Ireland 1767–1769". English History Review. 97 (383): 540–559.
- Burke, Bernard; Burke, Ashworth P. (1915). A Genealogical and Heraldic History of the Peerage and Baronetage, the Privy Council, Knightage and Companionage (77th ed.). London: Harrison. OCLC 1155471554.
- Dunlop, Robert (1894). "Morres, Hervey Redmond, second Viscount Mountmorres (1746?–1797)". In Lee, Sidney (ed.). Dictionary of National Biography. Vol. XXXIX. New York: MacMillan and Co. pp. 89–90. OCLC 8544105.
- Dunlop, Robert; Du Toit, Alexander (2004). "Morres, Hervey Redmond, second Viscount Mountmorres (1741/2–1797)". In Matthew, Colin; Harrison, Brian (eds.). Oxford Dictionary of National Biography. Vol. 39. New York: Oxford University Press. pp. 256–257. ISBN 0-19-861389-X.
- Fryde, E. B.; Greenway, D. E.; Porter, S.; Roy, I., eds. (1986). Handbook of British Chronology. Royal Historical Society Guides and Handbooks, No. 2 (3rd ed.). London: Offices of the Royal Historical Society. ISBN 0-86193-106-8. – (for timeline)
- G. E. C. (1893). Complete Peerage of England, Scotland, Ireland, Great Britain and the United Kingdom, Extant, Extinct, or Dormant. Vol. V (1st ed.). London: George Bell and Sons. OCLC 1180836840. – L to M (for Mountmorres)
- G. E. C. (1902). Complete Baronetage, 1611 to 1800. Vol. II (1st ed.). Exeter: William Pollard & Co. OCLC 866278985. – 1625 to 1649
- Geoghegan, Patrick M. (October 2009). McGuire, James; Quinn, James (eds.). "Morres, Hervey Redmond". Dictionary of Irish Biography.
- London Gazette (15 August 1767). "At the Court at St James's, the 12th Day of August, 1676". London Gazette. No. 10754.
- McDowell, R. B. (1979). Ireland in the age of Imperialism and Revolution 1760 – 1801. Oxford: Clarendon Press. ISBN 0-19-822480-X.

Peerage of Ireland
Preceded by Hervey Morres	Viscount Mountmorres; 1766–1797	Succeeded by Francis de Montmorency
