= Sir William de Montmorency, 3rd Baronet =

Anglo-Irish politician

Sir William Evans Ryves de Montmorency, 3rd Baronet (7 November 1763 – 14 April 1829) was an Anglo-Irish politician.

== Biography ==
Born William Morres, he was the son of Sir William Morres, 1st Baronet and Mary Juliana Ryves, and the half-brother of Sir Haydock Morres, 2nd Baronet. On 11 October 1774 he succeeded to his half-brother's baronetcy. Between 1785 and 1790 he was the Member of Parliament for Newtownards in the Irish House of Commons. On 17 June 1815 he legally changed his surname to de Montmorency by Royal Licence, as did his relation Lodge de Montmorency, 1st Viscount Frankfort de Montmorency and three other cousins. On his death, his title became extinct.

Parliament of Ireland
Preceded by John Ponsonby; George Lowther	Member of Parliament for Newtownards; 1785–1790; With: John Ponsonby (1785–1788); Henry Alexander (1788–1790)	Succeeded by Richard Annesley; John La Touche
Baronetage of Ireland
Preceded by Haydock Morres	Baronet (of Upper Wood); 1774–1829	Extinct
