= Hervey Morres =

Hervey Morres may refer to:

- Hervey Montmorency Morres (1767–1839), Irish nationalist
- Hervey Morres, 1st Viscount Mountmorres (1707–1766), Irish landowner and politician
- Hervey Redmond Morres, 2nd Viscount Mountmorres (c.1743–1797), Anglo-Irish politician and writer
