= Robert O'Callaghan =

Robert O'Callaghan may refer to:

- Robert O'Callaghan (British Army officer) (1777–1840), member of the Parliament of Ireland for Bandonbridge, 1798–1801
- Robert O'Callaghan (politician, born 1710) (1710–1761), Irish politician, member of the Parliament of Ireland for Fethard, Tipperary, 1755–1760
- Robert Elliott O'Callaghan, (1855–1936), English vegetarianism activist

== See also ==
- Robert Callahan (disambiguation)
