= Sir Haydock Morres, 2nd Baronet =

Sir Haydock Evans Morres, 2nd Baronet (1743 – 18 December 1776) was an Anglo-Irish politician.

== Biography ==
Morres was the son of Sir William Morres, 1st Baronet and Margaret Haydock. In 1766 he served a term as Mayor of Kilkenny. Morres was the Member of Parliament for Kilkenny City in the Irish House of Commons between 1768 and his death in 1776.

On 11 October 1774 he succeeded to his father's baronetcy. He had married Frances Jane Gorges Gore on 23 July 1772, but died without issue. Morres' title was inherited by his younger half-brother, William.

Parliament of Ireland
Preceded by Sir John Blunden, Bt; Sir William Morres, Bt	Member of Parliament for Kilkenny City; 1768–1776; With: Sir John Blunden, Bt (1768–1776); Ralph Gore (1776)	Succeeded by Ralph Gore; Eland Mossom
Baronetage of Ireland
Preceded by William Morres	Baronet (of Upper Wood); 1774–1776	Succeeded by William de Montmorency
