= Blundy =

Blundy is a surname. Notable people with the surname include:

- Anna Blundy (born 1970), British author and journalist
- Brett Blundy (born 1959/1960), Australian billionaire businessman
- David Blundy (1945–1989), British journalist and war correspondent
- Jon Blundy (born 1961), British petrologist

== Fictional ==
- Laura Blundy (2000), historical novel by Julie Myerson set in Victorian London
