= Cornelius O'Callaghan, 1st Baron Lismore =

Irish politician (1741–1797)

Cornelius O'Callaghan, 1st Baron Lismore (7 January 1741 – 12 July 1797), was an Irish politician and peer.

O'Callaghan was the son of Thomas O'Callaghan and Sarah Davis. He served in the Irish House of Commons as the Member of Parliament for Fethard, County Tipperary, between 1768 and 1785. On 27 June 1785 he was made Baron Lismore, of Shanbally, in the Peerage of Ireland, and assumed his seat in the Irish House of Lords.

He married Frances Ponsonby, daughter of John Ponsonby and Lady Elizabeth Cavendish, on 13 December 1774. he was succeeded in his title by his eldest son, Cornelius O'Callaghan, who was created Viscount Lismore in 1806. Another son was the British Army officer, Sir Robert O'Callaghan. One of Lord Lismore's daughters, Louisa, married William Cavendish and was the mother of The 7th Duke of Devonshire.

Parliament of Ireland
Preceded by Cornelius O'Callaghan; Stephen Moore	Member of Parliament for Fethard; 1768–1785; With: John Croker (1768–1776); David Walsh (1776–1783); Thomas Barton (1783–1785)	Succeeded by Daniel Gahan; Thomas Barton
Peerage of Ireland
New creation	Baron Lismore; 1785–1797	Succeeded by Cornelius O'Callaghan
