= High Sheriff of Kilkenny City =

The High Sheriff of Kilkenny City was the Sovereign's judicial representative in the city of the City of Kilkenny. Initially, an office for lifetime, assigned by the Sovereign, the High Sheriff became annually appointed from the Provisions of Oxford in 1258. Besides his judicial importance, he had ceremonial and administrative functions and executed High Court Writs.

== High Sheriffs of Kilkenny City ==
- 1334–1340: John Talbot
- 1407: Matthew Lappyng
- 1585: Thomas Cantwell
- 1736: Sir William Morres, 1st Baronet
- 1752: Edward Jollie
- 1813–1817: John Keogh; Henry Anderson (served for 20 years)
- 1835–1838: Benjamin Barton
- 1840–1842: Benjamin Barton
- 1843–1844: Sir John Blunden, 3rd Baronet
- 1845: John M'Craith, of Kilkenny.
- 1848: George Reade of Kilkenny
- 1849: John Newport Green of Lakeaview
- 1850: Richard Smithwick, of Birchfield, Kilkenny.
- 1853: John Wade
- 1854: Thomas Hart
- 1856: Edward Mulhallan of Seville Lodge, Kilkenny
- 1858: George P. Helsham of John Street, Kilkenny
- 1862: Thomas Power
- 1867: D. Cullen
- 1869: James Sullivan
- 1870: James Smithwick of Drakeland
- Joseph Empson
- John F. Smithwick
- Edmond Smithwick
- 1881: Richard Colles, of Millmount
- 1883: Simon Morris
- 1884: Patrick Murphy
- 1886: Edward Fennessy
