= General Bragg =

General Bragg may refer to:

- Braxton Bragg (1817–1876), General in the Confederate States Army during the American Civil War
- Edward S. Bragg (1827–1912), Union Army brigadier general
- Philip Bragg (died 1759), Irish lieutenant general
- USS General Bragg (1851), a warship that was pressed into service by the Confederate Navy during the American civil war
