= Francis Russell, Marquess of Tavistock =

British politician

Marquess of Tavistock
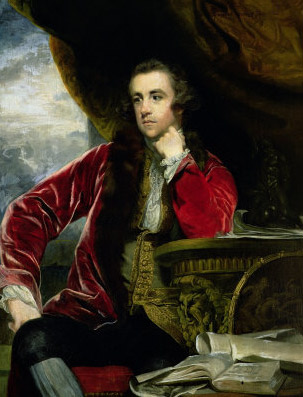
- Portrait of Tavistock by Joshua Reynolds

Member of Parliament for Bedfordshire
- In office 1761–1767 Serving with Robert Henley-Ongley
- Preceded by: Sir Thomas Alston, Bt; Henry Osborn
- Succeeded by: Robert Henley-Ongley; The Earl of Upper Ossory

Member of Parliament for Armagh Borough
- In office 1759–1760 Serving with Edward Knatchbull
- Preceded by: Edward Knatchbull; Philip Bragg
- Succeeded by: Robert Cuninghame; Hon. John Ponsonby

Personal details
- Born: 27 September 1739
- Died: 22 March 1767 (aged 27)
- Spouse: Lady Elizabeth Keppel
- Children: Francis Russell, 5th Duke of Bedford; John Russell, 6th Duke of Bedford; Lord William Russell
- Parent(s): John Russell, 4th Duke of Bedford; Hon. Gertrude Leveson-Gower

Francis Russell, Marquess of Tavistock (27 September 1739 – 22 March 1767) was a British politician and heir apparent to the dukedom of Bedford until his death in 1767.

== Early life ==
Russell was born on 27 September 1739. He was the eldest son of the John Russell, 4th Duke of Bedford and, his second wife, Lady Gertrude Leveson-Gower. His father was a prominent Whig statesman and peer who served as the Lord Lieutenant of Ireland, Lord Privy Seal, Lord President of the Council, and British Ambassador to France. His only sibling was Lady Caroline Russell, the wife of George Spencer, 4th Duke of Marlborough.

His father was the fourth son of Wriothesley Russell, 2nd Duke of Bedford, and the former Elizabeth Howland (daughter and heiress of John Howland of Streatham). His maternal grandparents were John Leveson-Gower, 1st Earl Gower and the former Lady Evelyn Pierrepont (eldest daughter of the 1st Duke of Kingston-upon-Hull).

== Career ==
From 1759 to 1761, he sat in the Irish House of Commons as Whig Member of Parliament for Armagh Borough and then in the British House of Commons for Bedfordshire until 1767. He was considered a close friend of Thomas Robinson, 2nd Baron Grantham.

In 1759 his father, the Duke, as Lord Lieutenant of Bedfordshire, commissioned the 19-year-old Marquess as Colonel of the Bedfordshire Militia, which was being reformed for home defence because of the Seven Years' War. The enthusiastic young man confessed that he was "militia mad ... you don't know how dangerous it was to let me loose." His parents suspected that this meant that he was developing a taste for low company, but he denied this indignantly. The regiment, he said, was "my ruling passion in life. I mean my rage for everything that has connection with a Military life – I own the prevelency of it and confess it to be a madness." In 1762 he could still say that "my old hobby horse has entirely distanced all the new ones." When the regiment was due to be disembodied at the end of the war, he wanted to have a painting done of four or five of his men in uniform: "(like every other lover) I cannot part with my favourite mistress my regiment without desiring to have her picture." When the regiment was disembodied in December 1762, a 'dead' time of the year for finding work, he arranged for those who could find none to be employed on the Bedford estates. He told his father that he had always tried to preserve the morals of his men and not make them bad citizens by making them good soldiers, and their orderly behaviour to the end made him think that he had succeeded.

He was elected as a Bailiff to the board of the Bedford Level Corporation in 1761, a position he held until his death.

== Personal life ==
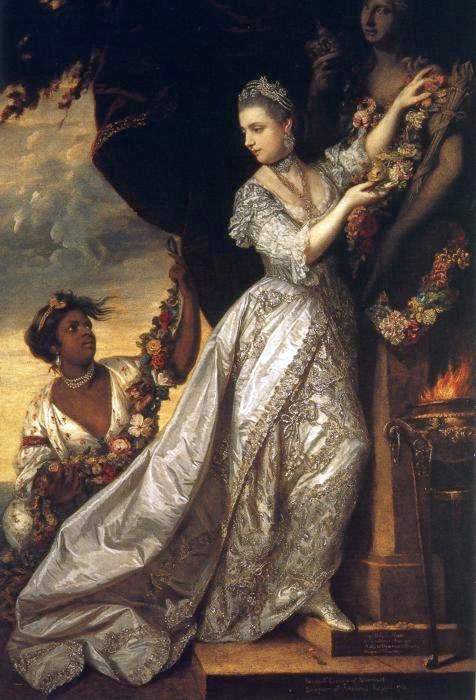
Portrait of his wife by Sir Joshua Reynolds, 1761.

On 8 June 1764, he married Lady Elizabeth Keppel (1739–1768), the youngest child of Willem Anne van Keppel, 2nd Earl of Albemarle. Lady Elizabeth had been one of ten bridesmaids to Queen Charlotte at her wedding to George III. They had three sons:

- Francis Russell, 5th Duke of Bedford (1765–1802), who never married.
- John Russell, 6th Duke of Bedford (1766–1839), who married Hon. Georgiana Byng, daughter of George Byng, 4th Viscount Torrington. After her death, he married Lady Georgiana Gordon, daughter of Alexander Gordon, 4th Duke of Gordon.
- Lord William Russell (1767–1840), who married Lady Charlotte Villiers, eldest daughter of George Villiers, 4th Earl of Jersey.

Lord Tavistock died in 1767 after falling from his horse while hunting. Their eldest son succeeded his grandfather as 5th Duke of Bedford in 1771. His widow died two years later of tuberculosis.

Parliament of Ireland
Preceded by Edward Knatchbull; Philip Bragg	Member of Parliament for Armagh Borough; 1759–1760; With: Edward Knatchbull	Succeeded by Robert Cuninghame; Hon. John Ponsonby
Parliament of Great Britain
Preceded by Sir Thomas Alston, Bt; Henry Osborn	Member of Parliament for Bedfordshire; 1761–1767; With: Robert Henley-Ongley	Succeeded by Robert Henley-Ongley; The Earl of Upper Ossory
