= Castle Blunden =

Historic house in County Kilkenny, Ireland

- Location within Ireland

General information
- Location: CastleBlunden, Kilkenny, Ireland
- Coordinates: 52°38′16″N 7°17′49″W

Castle Blunden is a historic country house in Kilkenny, home to the Blunden family.

== House ==
The house itself is a classical style three-storey detached country house with a single-storey Doric portico. The house dates from the 1740's, is believed to have been designed by Francis Bindon and is considered to have been designed in a style like that of nearby contemporary Bonnettstown Hall. The house has been maintained so that the original character remains. The house's main material is limestone with heraldic plaques in the centre of the top floor.

== History ==
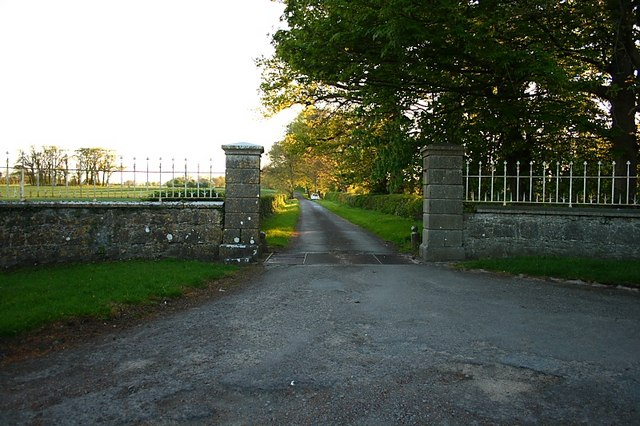
Entrance gate to Castle Blunden

Overington Blunden of Southwark, London was granted lands in Kilkenny in 1667 along with land in Offaly, Waterford and Tipperary. He is listed as a Cromwellian Adventurer and at least some of his lands were taken from the Kilkenny local Shee family. His descendant was the barrister Sir John Blunden, 1st Baronet who built and lived in Castle Blunden. Like his father he was a member of the Irish House of Commons, elected for the constituency of Kilkenny City in 1761. He was made a Baronet on 12 March 1766. It remains in the Blunden family with Patrick Perceval Blunden taking over the estate in 2011.

== See also ==
- List of historic houses in the Republic of Ireland
