= Sir Edward Knatchbull, 7th Baronet =

Irish politician (1704–1789)

The Right Honourable Sir Edward Knatchbull Bt
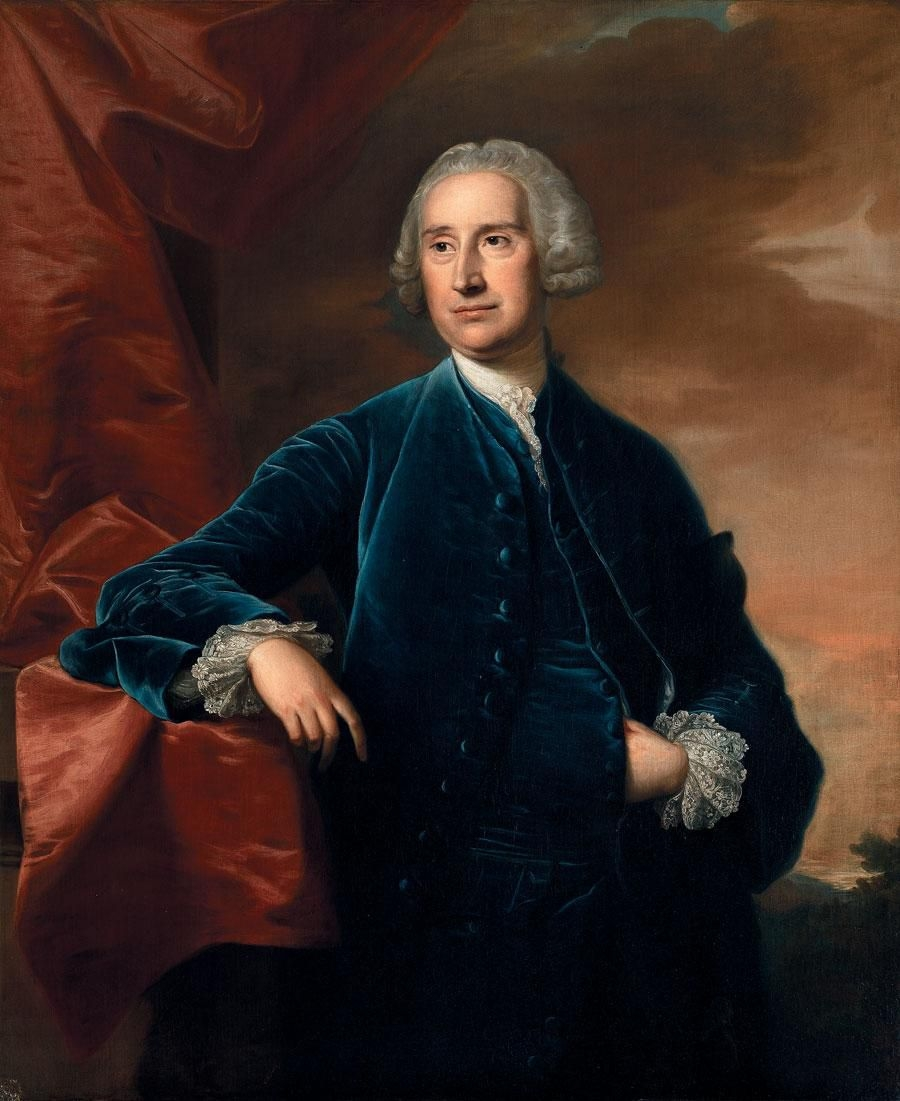

Member of Parliament for Armagh Borough
- In office 1727–1760

Personal details
- Born: 12 December 1704
- Died: 21 November 1789 (aged 84)
- Spouse: Grace Legge
- Parent(s): Sir Edward Knatchbull; Alice Wyndham

Sir Edward Knatchbull, 7th Baronet (12 December 1704 – 21 November 1789) was an Irish politician.

He was the third son of Sir Edward Knatchbull, 4th Baronet and Alice Wyndham, daughter of Colonel John Wyndham. In 1763, he succeeded his nephew Sir Wyndham Knatchbull-Wyndham, 6th Baronet as baronet. Knatchbull was a Member of Parliament (MP) for Armagh Borough in the Irish House of Commons from 1727 until 1760.

Knatchbull married Grace Legge, second daughter of William Legge. They had five daughters and three sons. He died, aged 84, and was succeeded in the baronetcy by his only surviving son Edward.

Parliament of Ireland
Preceded by Silvester Crosse; John Eyre	Member of Parliament for Armagh Borough; 1727–1760; With: Ambrose Philips 1727–1749; Philip Bragg 1749–1759; Marquess of Tavistock 1759–1760	Succeeded by Robert Cuninghame; Hon. John Ponsonby
Baronetage of England
Preceded by Wyndham Knatchbull-Wyndham	Baronet (of Mersham Hatch); 1763–1789	Succeeded by Edward Knatchbull
