= Cornelius O'Callaghan, 1st Viscount Lismore =

Irish Whig politician

Cornelius O'Callaghan, 1st Viscount Lismore PC (I) (2 October 1775 – 30 May 1857) was an Irish Whig politician.

== Biography ==
He was the son of Cornelius O'Callaghan, 1st Baron Lismore and Frances Ponsonby. He succeeded to his father's title on 12 July 1797 and assumed his seat in the Irish House of Lords. On 30 May 1806 he was created Viscount Lismore in the Peerage of Ireland.

From 1806 to 1807 he sat in the House of Commons of the United Kingdom as a Member of Parliament (MP) for Lostwithiel, a rotten borough in Cornwall controlled by Lord Mount Edgcumbe.

In 1835 he was made a Member of the Privy Council of Ireland. In 1838 he was made Baron Lismore in the Peerage of the United Kingdom, giving him and his descendants an automatic seat in the British House of Lords. He served as Lord Lieutenant of Tipperary between 20 October 1851 and his death in 1857.

He married Lady Eleanor Butler, daughter of John Butler, 17th Earl of Ormonde and Lady Frances Susan Elizabeth Wandesford, on 11 August 1808. They divorced in 1826. He was succeeded in his title by his third and only surviving son, George O'Callaghan.

The 1st Viscount of Lismores son Cornelius O'Callaghan (1809–1849) who pre-deceased him, served as MP for Tipperary and Dungarvan in the House of Commons.

Parliament of the United Kingdom
Preceded by Hans Sloane; William Dickinson	Member of Parliament for Lostwithiel; 1806–1807; With: William Dickinson to January 1807; Charles Cockerell from January 1807	Succeeded by George Peter Holford; Ebenezer Maitland
Honorary titles
Preceded by The Earl of Donoughmore	Lord Lieutenant of Tipperary; 1851–1857	Succeeded by The Viscount Lismore
Peerage of Ireland
New creation	Viscount Lismore; 1806–1857	Succeeded by George O'Callaghan
Preceded by Cornelius O'Callaghan	Baron Lismore; 1797–1857	Succeeded by George O'Callaghan
Peerage of the United Kingdom
New creation	Baron Lismore; 1838–1857	Succeeded by George O'Callaghan
