= The Sunday Correspondent =

Defunct British newspaper

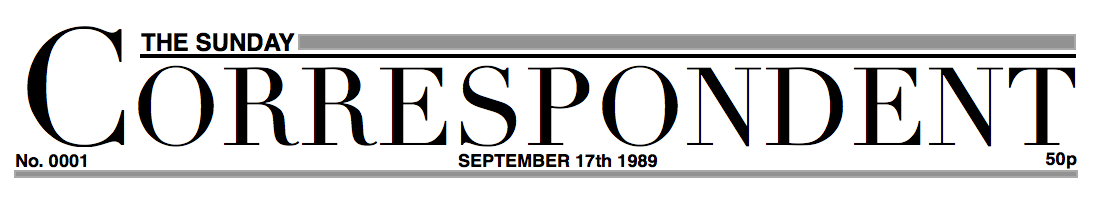
- Type: Weekly
- Format: Broadsheet
- Editor: Peter Cole (1989–90); John Bryant (1990)
- Founded: 17 September 1989
- Ceased publication: 25 November 1990
- Language: English

The Sunday Correspondent was a British weekly national broadsheet newspaper. The newspaper first appeared on 17 September 1989; the title ceased publication with the last issue on 25 November 1990. It was edited by Peter Cole for most of its existence. Cole later entered academia.

== Launch ==
On launching, the paper billed itself as the first new quality Sunday title for 28 years (since the launch of The Sunday Telegraph in 1961). The Chicago-based Tribune Company, publishers of the Chicago Tribune newspaper, were one of the investors in the new venture. Others included the Prudential Group and Rothschild Ventures, among other banking and financial institutions.

Interviewed in July 1989 by The Glasgow Herald, chief executive Nick Shott said the new title was to be aimed at younger readers of The Guardian and The Independent, market research having suggested a potential readership existed there, but he also anticipated picking up interest from purchasers of the middle market titles. The newspaper was planned as having only two sections and a colour supplement. By this time, the imminent launch of The Independent on Sunday was public knowledge, and Shott himself did not think both titles could survive. At around this time, in the summer of 1989, talks took place between the holding companies of both newspapers, but failed because while the Sunday Correspondent Ltd were interested in a joint venture, Newspaper Publishing PLC wanted to buy its imminent competitor.

== Crisis and closure ==
In March 1990, in a refinancing arrangement, the Tribune Company of Chicago doubled its shareholding to a 17.7% holding, and invested $2.9 million, making it the largest shareholder. Guardian and Manchester Evening News P.L.C., then without a national Sunday title, also became involved acquiring a 16.6% stake and gave the struggling company a substantial loan. The company had said the paper's break-even point was a circulation of 350,000, but the title was then selling only 220,000 copies.

By the time it ceased publication just over a year after its launch, it had been relaunched as Britain's first quality tabloid. In this form, from the issue published on 20 August 1990 onwards, it had a new editor, John Bryant. Underfunding and the launch of the IoS in January 1990 were factors in its demise, as well as the lack of a daily equivalent to help spread production costs. The IoS was also in competition with The Sunday Correspondent for the same sources of potential investment.

== Legacy ==
Journalists Jonathan Freedland and Luke Harding of The Guardian, Ian Katz of Channel 4, ITV News's political editor Robert Peston and art critic Andrew Graham-Dixon all started their national careers on the title. Other prominent journalists on the staff were Henry Porter, who edited the magazine, Donald Macintyre formerly of The Independent, feature editor Mick Brown, foreign correspondent David Blundy and Catherine Bennett.

One of the features in the paper was Pass Notes, which was taken up by The Guardian in 1992, where it remains as of February 2022.
