= Epaphroditus Marsh =

Irish politician

Epaphroditus Marsh (January 1637 – July 1719) was an Irish politician. He sat in the Irish House of Commons as a Member of Parliament (MP) for Fethard, Tipperary from 1703 to 1713, for Armagh Borough from 1713 to 1715, and then for Fethard again from 1715 until his death in 1719.

Parliament of Ireland
| Preceded by Thomas Carter; Matthew Jacob | Member of Parliament for Fethard, Tipperary; 1703–1713; With: Matthew Jacob | Succeeded by Sir Redmond Everard, 4th Bt; Cornelius O'Callaghan |
| Preceded by Marmaduke Coghill; Samuel Dopping | Member of Parliament for Armagh Borough; 1713–1715; With: Samuel Dopping | Succeeded by Silvester Crosse; Charles Bourchier |
| Preceded by Sir Redmond Everard, 4th Bt; Cornelius O'Callaghan | Member of Parliament for Fethard, Tipperary; 1715–1719; With: Guy Moore | Succeeded by Stephen Moore; Guy Moore |
