= Constantine O'Neale =

Irish Jacobite politician

Constantine O'Neale (c. 1620 – 1692) was an Irish Jacobite politician.

O'Neale was the son of Richard Neale of County Wexford.

On 2 December 1664, O'Neale was made a justice of the peace for County Wexford and in 1667 he was granted estates in New Ross by Charles II of England. A supporter of James II after the Glorious Revolution, O'Neale was a Member of Parliament for Armagh Borough in the brief Patriot Parliament called by James II in 1689. He died in 1692.

Parliament of Ireland
Preceded by Hon. Sir James Graham; Thomas Chambers	Member of Parliament for Armagh Borough; 1689; With: Francis Stafford	Succeeded by Marmaduke Coghill; Edward Lyndon
