= Maurice Cuffe =

Irish politician

Maurice Cuffe was an Irish politician.

Cuffe was born in Castleinch and educated at Trinity College, Dublin.

Cuffe represented Kilkenny City from 1715 to 1727.
