= Armagh Borough (Parliament of Ireland constituency) =

Pre-1801 Irish constituency

- Former borough constituency for the Irish House of Commons
- County: County Armagh
- Borough: Armagh

1613–1801
- Seats: 2
- Replaced by: Armagh City

Armagh Borough (also known as Armagh City) was a constituency represented in the Irish House of Commons, the house of representatives of the Kingdom of Ireland, from 1613 to 1800.

== History ==
This constituency was the borough of Armagh in County Armagh.

During the Commonwealth of England, Scotland and Ireland the borough was not granted separate representation in the Protectorate Parliaments (1654–1659), from the county constituency of Down, Antrim and Armagh.

After the restoration, in 1660, the Parliament of Ireland was revived with the borough again represented. In the Patriot Parliament of 1689 summoned by King James II, Armagh Borough was represented by two members.

The city of Armagh, County Armagh, was the episcopal seat of the primate of All Ireland, the Archbishop of Armagh. The sovereign of Armagh corporation was the primate's land agent, or the seneschal of the manor, making the constituency a bishop's borough. The other burgesses were clergymen, "who seem to have held on an express or implied stipulation to resign on quitting the diocese, or in case of their becoming unwilling to act under the archbishop's direction". As these clergymen naturally looked to the archbishop for preferment, it is improbable that there were many resignations under the last clause of the agreement; and a corporation so managed must have been as easy to control as through tenants who had taken an oath, and against whom, moreover, the agent had the additional lever of the "hanging gale" (rent arrears).

At Armagh, in the closing years of the old representative system, the archbishop although he was not a member of the corporation, and had no constitutional connection with it commanded twelve of the thirteen votes by which the members of Parliament for the city were elected; and "so completely was the election of the members considered to be in the primate, that he regularly paid the expenses of the admission of the free burgesses, amounting to five pounds each".

Following the Acts of Union 1800 the borough retained one parliamentary seat in the United Kingdom House of Commons.

== Members of Parliament, 1613–1801 ==
- 1613–1615 Marcus Ussher and Christopher Conway
- 1634–1635 John Dillon and William Hilton
- 1639–1649 William Dixon and Sir Archibald Hamilton, Bt
- 1661–1666 Hon Sir James Graham and Thomas Chambers

=== 1689–1801 ===
| Election | First MP | Second MP |
|---|---|---|
| 1689 | Francis Stafford | Constantine O'Neale |
| 1692 | Marmaduke Coghill | Edward Lyndon |
| 1695 | Marmaduke Coghill | Samuel Dopping (Note: Also elected for Dublin University in 1715, for which he chose to sit.) |
| 1713 | Epaphroditus Marsh | Samuel Dopping |
| 1715 | Silvester Crosse | Charles Bourchier |
| 1716 | Silvester Crosse | John Eyre |
| 1727 | Edward Knatchbull | Ambrose Philips |
| 1749 | Edward Knatchbull | Philip Bragg |
| 1759 | Edward Knatchbull | Marquess of Tavistock |
| May 1761 | Robert Cuninghame | Hon. John Ponsonby (Note: Also elected for County Kilkenny in 1761, for which he chose to sit.) |
| 1761 | Robert Cuninghame | Hon. Barry Maxwell |
| 1768 | George Macartney | Philip Tisdall (Note: Also elected for Dublin University in 1768, for which he chose to sit.) |
| 1769 | George Macartney | Charles O'Hara |
| 1776 | Philip Tisdall | Henry Meredyth |
| 1777 | George Rawson | Henry Meredyth |
| January 1790 | George Rawson | Henry Duquerry |
| May 1790 | George Rawson | Robert Hobart (Note: Styled as Lord Hobart from 1793.) |
| 1796 | Sackville Hamilton | Robert Hobart |
| 1798 | Hon. Thomas Pelham | Patrick Duigenan |
| 1799 | Gerard Lake | Patrick Duigenan |
| 1801 | Succeeded by the Westminster constituency Armagh City | |

== Bibliography ==
- O'Hart, John (2007). The Irish and Anglo-Irish Landed Gentry: When Cromwell came to Ireland. Vol. II. Heritage Books. ISBN 978-0-7884-1927-0.
- Leigh Rayment's historical List of Members of the Irish House of Commons. Cites: Johnston-Liik, Edith Mary (2002). The History of the Irish Parliament 1692-1800 (6 volumes). Ulster Historical Foundation.
