= Cornelius O'Callaghan (died 1742) =

Irish politician (1681–1742)

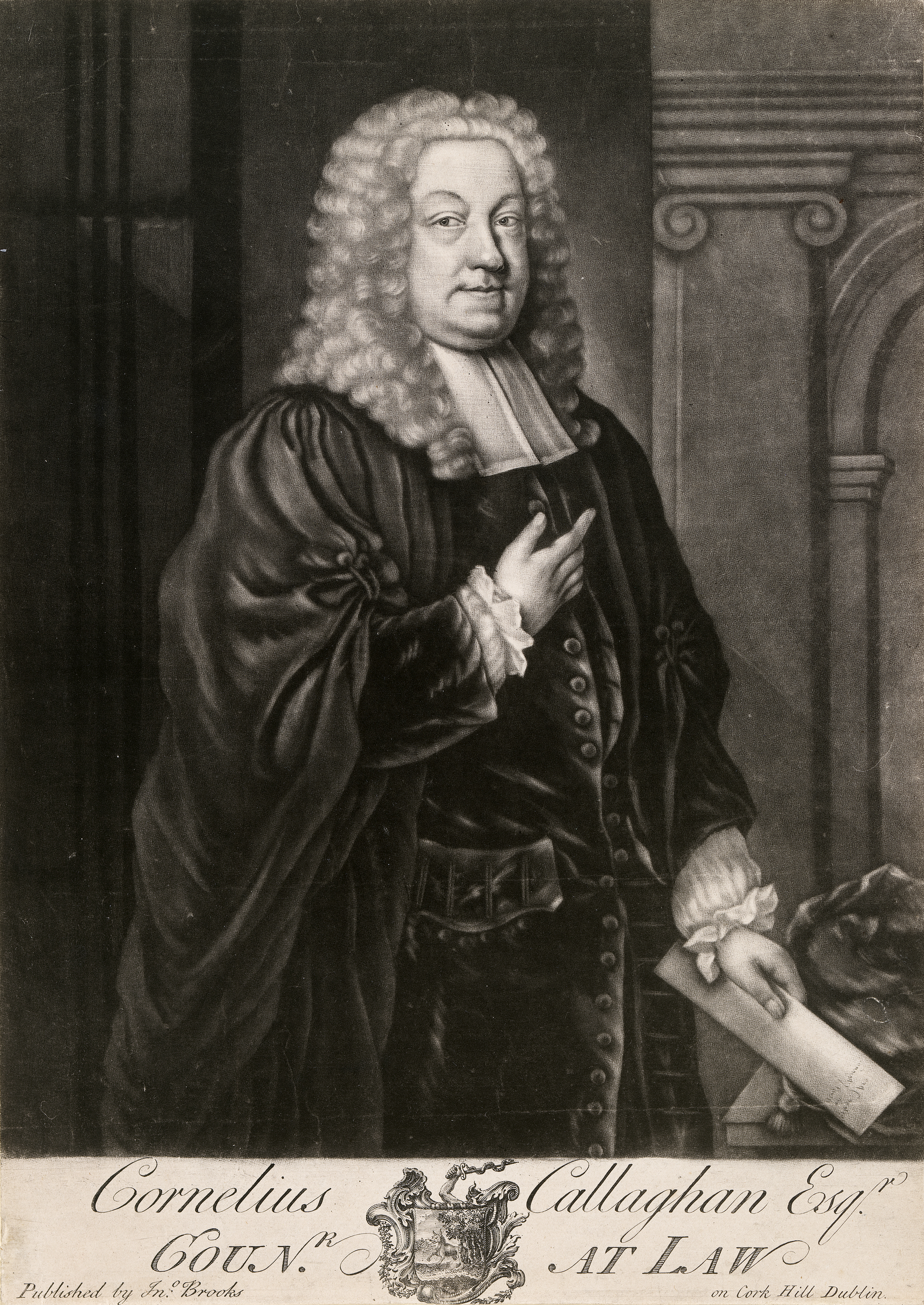
- Born: c. 1681
- Died: 3 January 1742 (aged 60–61)

Cornelius O'Callaghan (c. 1681 – 3 January 1742) was an Irish politician. He sat in the Irish House of Commons as a Member of Parliament (MP) for the borough of Fethard in County Tipperary from 1713 to 1714.

Parliament of Ireland
Preceded by Matthew Jacob; Epaphroditus Marsh	Member of Parliament for Fethard, Tipperary; 1713–1714; With: Sir Redmond Everard, Bt	Succeeded by Guy Moore; Epaphroditus Marsh
