= Robert Callahan =

Robert or Bob Callahan may refer to:

- Bob Callahan (politician) (1937–2020), Canadian politician
- Bob Callahan (American football) (1923–2011), American football player
- Robert J. Callahan (1930–2013), Connecticut Supreme Court justice

== See also ==
- Robert O'Callaghan (disambiguation)
- Robert Callaghan, a fictional character in the 2016 animated film Big Hero 6
