= Viscount Lismore =

Irish peerage title

Viscount Lismore, of Shanbally, was a title in the Peerage of Ireland. It was created in 1806 for Cornelius O'Callaghan, 2nd Baron Lismore, Lord-Lieutenant of County Tipperary. In 1838, he was also made Baron Lismore, of Shanbally Castle in the County of Tipperary, in the Peerage of the United Kingdom, which entitled him and his descendants to an automatic seat in the House of Lords. The second Viscount was also Lord-Lieutenant of County Tipperary. The titles became extinct on his death in 1898. The title Baron Lismore, of Shanbally, was created in the Peerage of Ireland in 1785 for Cornelius O'Callaghan, who had previously represented Fethard in the Irish House of Commons.

== Baron Lismore (1785) ==
- Cornelius O'Callaghan, 1st Baron Lismore (1741–1797)
- Cornelius O'Callaghan, 2nd Baron Lismore (1775–1857) (created Viscount Lismore in 1806)

== Viscounts Lismore (1806) ==
- Cornelius O'Callaghan, 1st Viscount Lismore (1775–1857)
- George Ponsonby O'Callaghan, 2nd Viscount Lismore (1815–1898)
