= Robert Cuninghame, 1st Baron Rossmore =

Irish soldier and politician, British Army general (1726 – 1801)

General The Right Honourable The Lord Rossmore PC (Ire)
- Born: 18 April 1726
- Died: 6 August 1801 (aged 75); London
- Military career
- Allegiance: Kingdom of Great Britain
- Branch: British Army
- Rank: General
- Commands: Ireland
- Conflicts: Jacobite rising of 1745

General Robert Cuninghame, 1st Baron Rossmore (18 April 1726 – 6 August 1801), was an Irish British Army officer and politician.

== Military career ==
Cuninghame was the son of Colonel David Cuninghame and his wife Margaret Callander of Craigforth. He was a General in the Army who fought at an early age at the Battle of Culloden in 1746 with the 14th Foot. He later served as Commander-in-Chief of Ireland from 1793 to 1796.

Cuninghame sat as a Member of the Irish House of Commons for Tulsk from 1751 to 1761, for Armagh Borough from 1761 to 1768 and for Monaghan Borough from 1768 to 1796. Between 1788 and 1789 he represented East Grinstead in the British House of Commons.

Lord Rossmore later sat as an Irish representative peer in the House of Lords from January 1801 until his death in August 1801. He was childless and was succeeded in the barony according to the special remainder by his wife's nephew Warner Westenra, 2nd Baron Rossmore. Lady Rossmore died in 1824. His residence was Mount Kennedy, near Newtownmountkennedy, County Wicklow. Here he died rather suddenly, aged seventy-five, in August 1801, having been in excellent health and good spirits to the end.

Sir Jonah Barrington (1756-1834), the judge and memoirist, was apparently the originator of the colourful story that Lord Rossmore's death was heralded by the wailing of a banshee.

== Family lineage ==
Cuninghame was a descendant of the Cuninghames of Drumquhassle and married Elizabeth Murray, second daughter and co-heiress of Colonel John Murray, in 1754. Elizabeth brought him a large dowry, but the marriage, if not for love, is said to have been very happy. He was admitted to the Irish Privy Council in 1782 and in 1796 he was raised to the Peerage of Ireland as Baron Rossmore, of Monaghan in the County of Monaghan, with remainder to his wife's nephews Henry Alexander Jones (the son of Theophilus Jones and Anne Murray, eldest sister of Elizabeth; Henry Alexander Jones died childless before his uncle Lord Rossmore) and Warner William Westenra and Lieutenant-Colonel Henry Westenra, sons of Henry Westenra and Harriet Murray, youngest sister of Elizabeth.

== Notes ==
Parliament of Ireland
Preceded by Frederick Gore; St George Caulfeild	Member of Parliament for Tulsk; 1751–1761; With: Frederick Gore	Succeeded by William Caulfeild; John Bagwell
Preceded by Edward Knatchbull; Marquess of Tavistock	Member of Parliament for Armagh Borough; 1761–1768; With: Hon. John Ponsonby 1761; Hon. Barry Maxwell 1761–1768	Succeeded by George Macartney; Philip Tisdall
Preceded by William Henry Fortescue; Richard Power	Member of Parliament for Monaghan Borough; 1768–1796; With: William Henry Fortescue 1768–1771; Henry Westenra 1771–1776; James Fortescue 1776–1777; Robert Dobson 1777–1783; Thomas James Fortescue 1783; Theophilus Jones 1783–1791; Cromwell Price 1791–1796	Succeeded by Cromwell Price; Henry Westenra
Parliament of Great Britain
Preceded by George Medley; James Cuninghame	Member of Parliament for East Grinstead; 1788–1789; With: George Medley	Succeeded by George Medley; Richard Ford
Military offices
New regiment	Colonel of the 124th Regiment of Foot; 1762–1763	Regiment disbanded
Preceded by Robert Anstruther	Colonel of the 58th (Rutlandshire) Regiment of Foot; 1768–1775	Succeeded by George West
Preceded by Hon. William Keppel	Colonel of the 14th (Bedfordshire) Regiment of Foot; 1775–1787	Succeeded by John Douglas
Preceded by Sir Joseph Yorke	Colonel of the 5th (Royal Irish) Regiment of Dragoons; 1787–1799	Regiment disbanded
Preceded by George Warde	Commander-in-Chief, Ireland; 1793–1796	Succeeded by The Earl of Carhampton
Parliament of the United Kingdom
New title	Representative peer for Ireland; 1800–1801	Succeeded by The Viscount Charleville
Peerage of Ireland
New creation	Baron Rossmore; 1796–1801	Succeeded by Warner Westenra
