= Samuel Dopping =

Anglo-Irish politician

Samuel Dopping (1671 – 17 September 1720) was an Anglo-Irish politician.

Dopping was the Member of Parliament for Armagh Borough in the Irish House of Commons between 1695 and 1715. In 1711 he was made a member of the Privy Council of Ireland. He then represented Dublin University from 1715 until his death. In parliament, Dopping was initially aligned to the Whig faction, but exercised increasing independence, particularly in defence of the established Church of Ireland and opposition to the amendment of Irish bills by the British Privy Council.

Parliament of Ireland
Preceded by Marmaduke Coghill; Edward Lyndon	Member of Parliament for Armagh Borough; 1695–1715; With: Marmaduke Coghill (1695–1713); Epaphroditus Marsh (1713–1715)	Succeeded by Silvester Crosse; Charles Bourchier
Preceded by Marmaduke Coghill; John Elwood	Member of Parliament for Dublin University; 1715–1720; With: Marmaduke Coghill	Succeeded by Marmaduke Coghill; Edward Hopkins
