= Reymond de Montmorency, 3rd Viscount Frankfort de Montmorency =

Anglo-Irish soldier

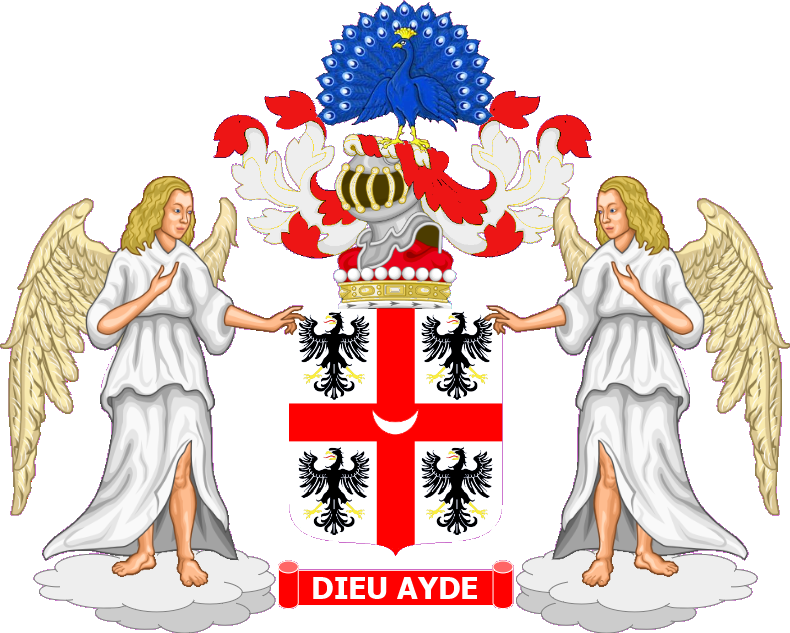
Armorial achievement as a Viscount

Major-General Reymond Hervey de Montmorency, 3rd Viscount Frankfort de Montmorency, KCB (21 September 1835 – 7 May 1902) was an Anglo-Irish British Army officer and a peer in the peerage of Ireland.

== Life ==
Montmorency was the son of Lodge Reymond de Montmorency, 2nd Viscount Frankfort de Montmorency (born Lodge Reymond Morres) and his wife Georgiana Frederica Henchy, a daughter of Peter FitzGibbon Henchy QC. He was educated at Eton. He served in the British Army and became a major-general in 1889.

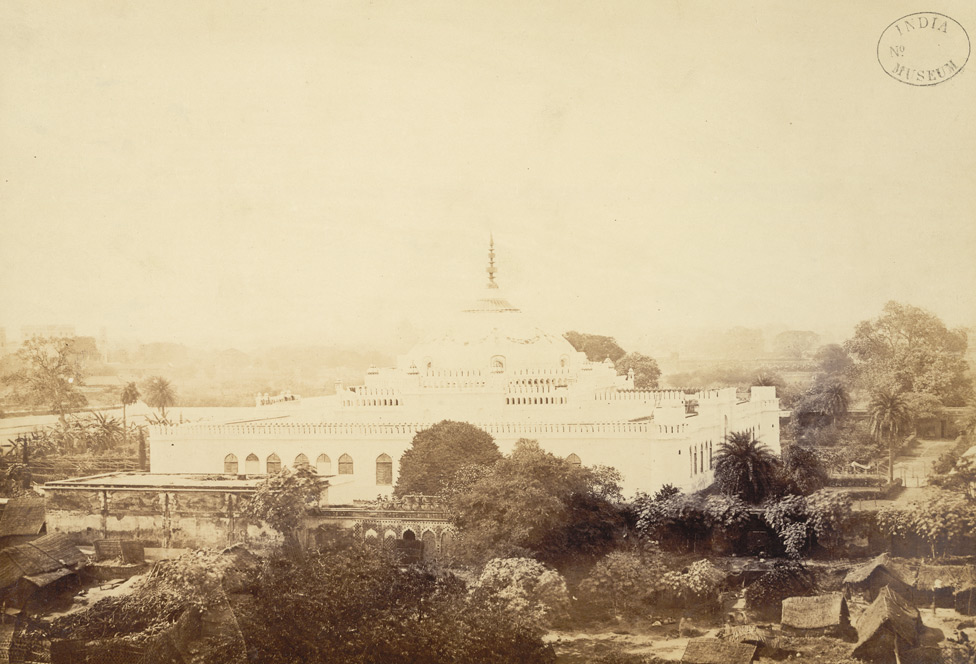
A photograph taken by de Montmorency of the Shah Najaf, the tomb of Ghazi-ud-Din Haidar, Lucknow in 1867

He accompanied his regiment to India, and fought during the Indian Mutiny. He was aide-de-camp to Sir John Michel. He volunteered with Sir Robert Napier, in the British Expedition to Abyssinia. He commanded in the Sudan in 1886–7.

In December 1889, he also succeeded his father in the viscountcy. This was an Irish peerage and did not entitle him to an automatic seat in the House of Lords. However, in 1900 he was elected an Irish representative peer, replacing the deceased Lord Inchiquin, and was able to take his seat in the upper chamber of parliament. In 1898, he had been made a Knight Commander of the Order of the Bath.

== Family ==
On 25 April 1866, he married Rachel Mary Lumley Godolphin Michel, daughter of Field Marshal Sir John Michel, at Montreal, Canada. Their eldest son, the Honourable Raymond de Montmorency was killed in action at the Battle of Stormberg in 1900. Lord Frankfort de Montmorency died in May 1902, aged 66, and was succeeded in the title by his second son, Willoughby.

Coat of arms of Reymond de Montmorency, 3rd Viscount Frankfort de Montmorency

Crest
A peacock in its pride Proper.
Escutcheon
Argent a cross Gules between four eagles displayed Sable a crescent for difference.
Supporters
Two angels Proper hair and wings Or vested Argent.
Motto
Dieu Ayde

Peerage of Ireland
Preceded by Lodge Raymond de Montmorency	Viscount Frankfort de Montmorency; 1889–1902	Succeeded by Willoughby John Horace de Montmorency
Political offices
Preceded by The Lord Inchiquin	Representative peer for Ireland; 1900–1902	Succeeded by The Lord Oranmore and Browne
