= Wyndham Knatchbull-Wyndham =

British baronet and Whig politician

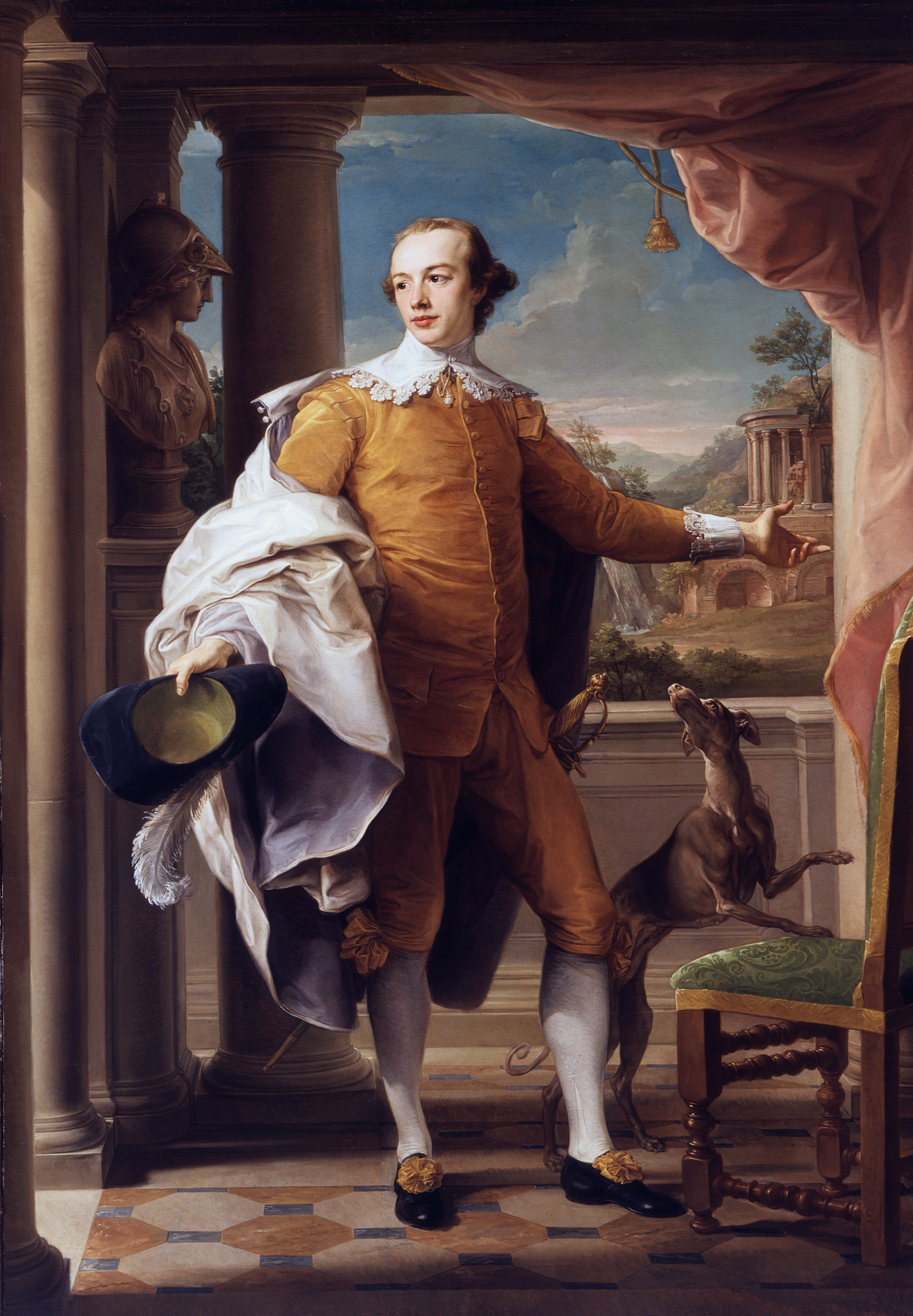
Portrait (1758–1759), oil on canvas, of Sir Wyndham Knatchbull-Wyndham, 6th Bt, by Pompeo Batoni (1708-1787)

Sir Wyndham Knatchbull-Wyndham, 6th Baronet (16 February 1737 – 26 September 1763) was a British baronet and Whig politician.

Born in Golden Square in Middlesex, he was the only son of Sir Wyndham Knatchbull-Wyndham, 5th Baronet and his wife Catharine, daughter of James Harris. In 1749, aged only twelve, Knatchbull-Wyndham succeeded his father as baronet. He was educated at Wadham College, Oxford until 1757 and began then his Grand Tour. After his return in 1760, he entered the British House of Commons, sitting as a Member of Parliament (MP) for Kent in the following three years. In Parliament he voted against the Treaty of Paris (1763). Knatchbull-Wyndham died, aged 26, unmarried and was succeeded in the baronetcy by his uncle Edward Knatchbull.

Parliament of Great Britain
Preceded by Robert Fairfax; Lewis Watson	Member of Parliament for Kent; 1760 – 1763; With: Robert Fairfax	Succeeded by Sir Brook Bridges, Bt; Robert Fairfax
Baronetage of England
Preceded by Wyndham Knatchbull-Wyndham	Baronet (of Mersham Hatch); 1749 – 1763	Succeeded by Edward Knatchbull
