= Viscount Mountmorres =

Arms of Montmorency which her eventually adopted in lieu of Morres

Viscount Mountmorres was a title in the Peerage of Ireland. It was created on 29 June 1763 for Hervey Morres, 1st Baron Mountmorres, who had previously represented St Canice in the Irish House of Commons. He had been created Baron Mountmorres, of Castlemorres in the County of Kilkenny, on 4 May 1756, also in the Peerage of Ireland. He was the grandson of Hervey Morres, member of the Irish Parliament for Knocktopher, younger son of Sir Redmond Morres, 2nd Baronet, of Knockagh (see below). Lord Mountmorres was succeeded by his son from his first marriage, the second Viscount. In 1795 he also succeeded his kinsman as 10th Baronet of Knockagh. He was succeeded in both the baronetcy and peerages by his half-brother, the third Viscount. He assumed in 1815 by Royal licence the surname of de Montmorency in lieu of Morres. On his death the titles passed to his son, the fourth Viscount. He was Dean of Cloyne and Dean of Achonry. The titles descended from father to son until the death of his grandson, the sixth Viscount, in 1936. The late Viscount was succeeded by his first cousin, the seventh Viscount. He was the son of the Hon. Arthur de Montmorency, fourth son of the fourth Viscount. He had no male issue and on his death in 1951 the barony and viscountcy became extinct.

However, he was succeeded in the baronetcy of Knockagh by his distant relative, Hervey de Montmorency, the sixteenth Baronet. He was the great-great-great-grandson of Redmond Morres, grandson of Hervey Morres, younger son of the second Baronet. de Montmorency worked for the Ministry of Health for many years. He was succeeded by his younger brother, the seventeenth Baronet. He was an artist. He was succeeded by his first cousin, the eighteenth Baronet. He was the son of John de Montmorency. On his death in 1979 the title passed to his first cousin, the nineteenth Baronet. He was the son of James Edward Geoffrey de Montmorency, Quain Professor of Comparative Law at the University of London. The title became extinct on his death in 2003.

Arms of Morres, which would be eventually exchanged for those of Montmorency

The Morres, later de Montmorency Baronetcy, of Knockagh in the County of Tipperary, was created in the Baronetage of Ireland on 28 March 1631 for John Morres. His grandson, the third Baronet, was a minor poet. The latter was succeeded by his grandson, the fourth Baronet. He was the son of Redmond Morres, a Colonel in the French Army. The fourth Baronet's son, the fifth Baronet, died unmarried at an early age and was succeeded by his uncle, the sixth Baronet. This line of the family failed on the death of his son, the seventh Baronet, who died childless in 1758. The late Baronet was succeeded by his first cousin once removed, the eighth Baronet. He was the son of Nicholas Morres, younger son of the third Baronet. He was a Colonel in the French Army. He was killed by a scaffold falling at the Coronation of Louis XVI in 1774. He was succeeded by his first cousin, the ninth Baronet. He was the son of James Morres, younger son of the third Baronet. He was also a Colonel in the French Army. He was childless and was succeeded by his kinsman, the second Viscount Mountmorres, who became the tenth Baronet. See above for further history of the title.

William Morres, brother of the first Viscount, was created a Baronet in 1758 (see De Montmorency baronets). Lodge de Montmorency, nephew of the first Viscount, was created Viscount Frankfort de Montmorency in 1816. Nicholas Morres, brother of the eighth Baronet, was a Brigadier-General in the French Army.

William Browne de Montmorency, 5th Viscount Mountmorres (1838–1880) graduated from Trinity College, Dublin, with honors. After marrying Harriet Broadrick of Hamphall Stubbs, Yorkshire, in 1862, Mountmorres used her dowry to purchase Ebor Hall on Tumneenaun Bay, Lough Corrib, Galway. Mountmorres was assassinated on the road between Clonbur and Ebor Hall on September 25, 1880, after attending a magistrates' meeting in Clonbur. His murder took place in the midst of Ireland's Land War. Various motives for his murder include his unwillingness to decrease rents for his tenants by the requested thirty percent—he had agreed to a twenty percent reduction. But the most credible reason for his assassination was that it was believed Mountmorres was a spy for Dublin Castle, the symbol of British oppression in Ireland, and was killed on the orders of a secret society then operating in Clonbur. "The most likely suspects emerged during testimony before a special Parliamentary commission investigating [Charles Stewart] Parnellism and Crime in 1888 in London. At that time, a laborer named Michael Burke was called to testify..." Burke gave the names of several men who had gathered at the publichouse of Patrick Kearney in Clonbur for the purpose of planning the murder of Mountmorres. Those present included Patrick Kearney, Patrick Sweeney, Barrett, Martin Fallon, Thomas Murphy, William Hanberry, Patrick Hennelly, and William Burke. "Although no charges were brought against any of those mentioned by Michael Burke, nevertheless, Burke's testimony is compelling as it appears likely that the men named by Burke either committed the murder or were accessories to murder."

== Morres, later de Montmorency baronets, of Knockagh (1631) ==
- Sir John Morres, 1st Baronet (c. 1573–1648)
- Sir Redmond Morres, 2nd Baronet (c. 1595–c. 1655)
- Sir John Morres, 3rd Baronet (1620–1720)
- Sir John Morres, 4th Baronet (died 1723)
- Sir Redmond Morres, 5th Baronet (c. 1717–1740)
- Sir Simon Morres, 6th Baronet (died c. 1750)
- Sir George Morres, 7th Baronet (died 1758)
- Sir Richard Morres, 8th Baronet (died 1774)
- Sir Nicholas Morres, 9th Baronet (c. 1710–1795)
- Sir Hervey Morres, 10th Baronet (c. 1743–1797) (had succeeded as Viscount Mountmorres in 1766)

== Viscounts Mountmorres (1763) ==
- Hervey Morres, 1st Viscount Mountmorres (c. 1706–1766)
- Hervey Redmond Morres, 2nd Viscount Mountmorres (c. 1743–1797)
- Francis Hervey de Montmorency, 3rd Viscount Mountmorres (1756–1833)
- Hervey de Montmorency, 4th Viscount Mountmorres (1790–1872)
- William Browne de Montmorency, 5th Viscount Mountmorres (1838–1880)
- William Geoffrey Bouchard de Montmorency, 6th Viscount Mountmorres (1872–1936)
- Arthur Herve Alberic Bouchard de Montmorency, 7th Viscount Mountmorres (1879–1951)

== Morres, later de Montmorency baronets, of Knockagh (1631; reverted) ==
- Sir (Hervey) Angus de Montmorency, 16th Baronet (1888–1959)
- Sir Miles Fletcher de Montmorency, 17th Baronet (1893–1963)
- Sir Reginald D'Alton Lodge de Montmorency, 18th Baronet (1899–1979)
- Sir Arnold Geoffroy de Montmorency, 19th Baronet (1908–2003)

== See also ==
- Morres baronets
- Viscount Frankfort de Montmorency
