= Cornelius O'Callaghan (1712–1781) =

Irish politician

Cornelius O'Callaghan (1712 – 1781) was an Irish politician.

O'Callaghan served in the Irish House of Commons as the Member of Parliament for Fethard, Tipperary between 1761 and 1768. He then represented Newtownards from 1775 to 1776.

Parliament of Ireland
Preceded by Matthew Jacob; Robert O'Callaghan	Member of Parliament for Fethard, Tipperary; 1761–1768; With: Stephen Moore	Succeeded by Cornelius O'Callaghan; John Croker
Preceded by Thomas Le Hunt; Sir William Morres, 1st Bt	Member of Parliament for Newtownards; 1775–1776; With: Arthur Dawson	Succeeded by Sir John Browne, 7th Bt; James Somerville
