= Philip Tisdall =

Irish lawyer and politician

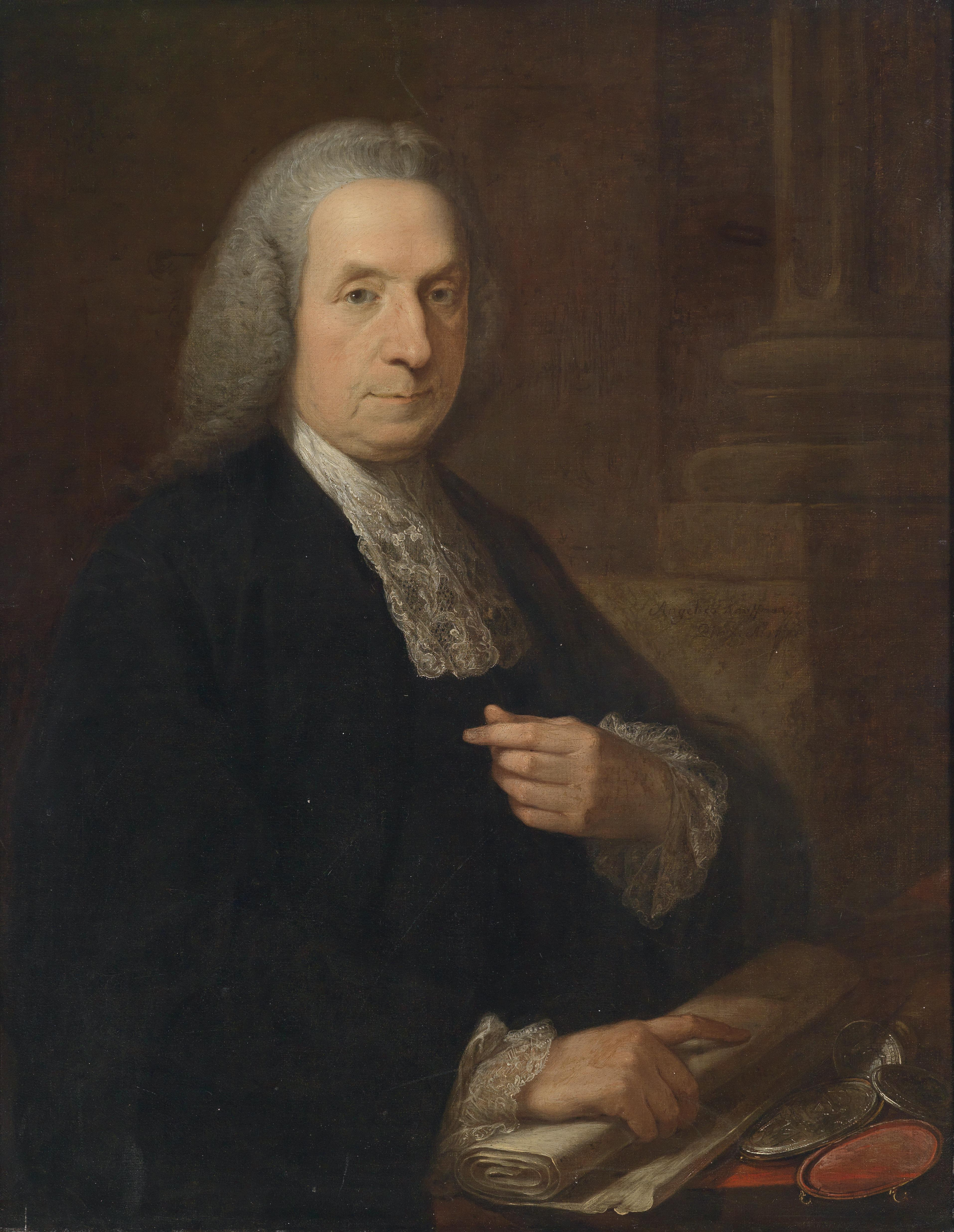
1770–1777 portrait of Tisdall by Angelica Kauffman

Philip Tisdall SL (1 March 1703 – 11 September 1777) was an Irish lawyer and politician, who held the office of Attorney-General for Ireland. He was for many years a leading figure in the Irish Government.

== Background ==
He was born in County Louth, son of Richard Tisdall (died 1742), who was MP for Dundalk in 1703–1713 and for County Louth in 1717–1727, by his wife Marian Boyle, daughter of Richard Boyle, MP, a cousin of the Earl of Cork. His father was also Registrar of the Court of Chancery (Ireland): this seems to have been a sinecure, since it passed to Philip on his father's death. They were cousins of the Reverend William Tisdall of Belfast, who nowadays is best remembered for his wish to marry Esther Johnson, the beloved Stella of Jonathan Swift; this connection may explain the interest (not, it seems, entirely friendly) which Swift in old age took in Philip's career.

He was educated at Thomas Sheridan's school in Dublin, and at Trinity College Dublin, where he graduated Bachelor of Arts in 1722. He entered Middle Temple in 1723 and was called to the Irish Bar in 1733. He quickly became one of the leaders of the Bar, partly through his legal ability and partly through his marriage into the wealthy and influential Singleton family of Drogheda, and was reputed to earn £30,000 a year. He was made a Bencher of the King's Inns in 1742.

== Career ==
He sat in the Irish House of Commons as MP for Dublin University from 1739 to 1776 and then for the city of Armagh from 1776 to his death. He had been elected as member for Armagh in 1768, but chose to continue sitting for the university.

In 1742, he was appointed Third Serjeant, then Solicitor-General in 1751 and Attorney-General in 1760. He enjoyed the crucial support of George Stone, Archbishop of Armagh. He was also appointed judge of the Prerogative Court of Ireland, an office he held from 1745 to his death, but failed to become Master of the Rolls in Ireland as he had hoped to on the death of his wife's uncle, Henry Singleton, in 1759. In 1763, he became Principal Secretary of State, and on 28 February 1764 he was appointed to the Privy Council of Ireland. For almost 20 years he was a crucial figure in the Irish Government, which relied on him to manage the Irish House of Commons, a task which he performed with great skill and tact.

Tisdall was almost all-powerful until 1767, when George Townshend, 1st Marquess Townshend arrived as Lord Lieutenant of Ireland. Townshend had a mandate to restore the direct power of the Crown over Irish affairs and to bypass the Irish political managers like Tisdall. To his credit, Townshend recognised that Tisdall's support was still an asset to the Government, and made great efforts to conciliate him.

Townshend lobbied hard for Tisdall to be appointed Lord Chancellor of Ireland, but to his bitter disappointment he came up against the inflexible British reluctance, which endured for many years afterwards, to appoint an Irishman to this crucial office.

Tisdall retained the confidence of successive Lords Lieutenants, and, in 1777, despite his age and failing health, he was asked to resume his role as Government leader in the House of Commons: he agreed, but died at Spa, Belgium on 11 September the same year.

== Family ==
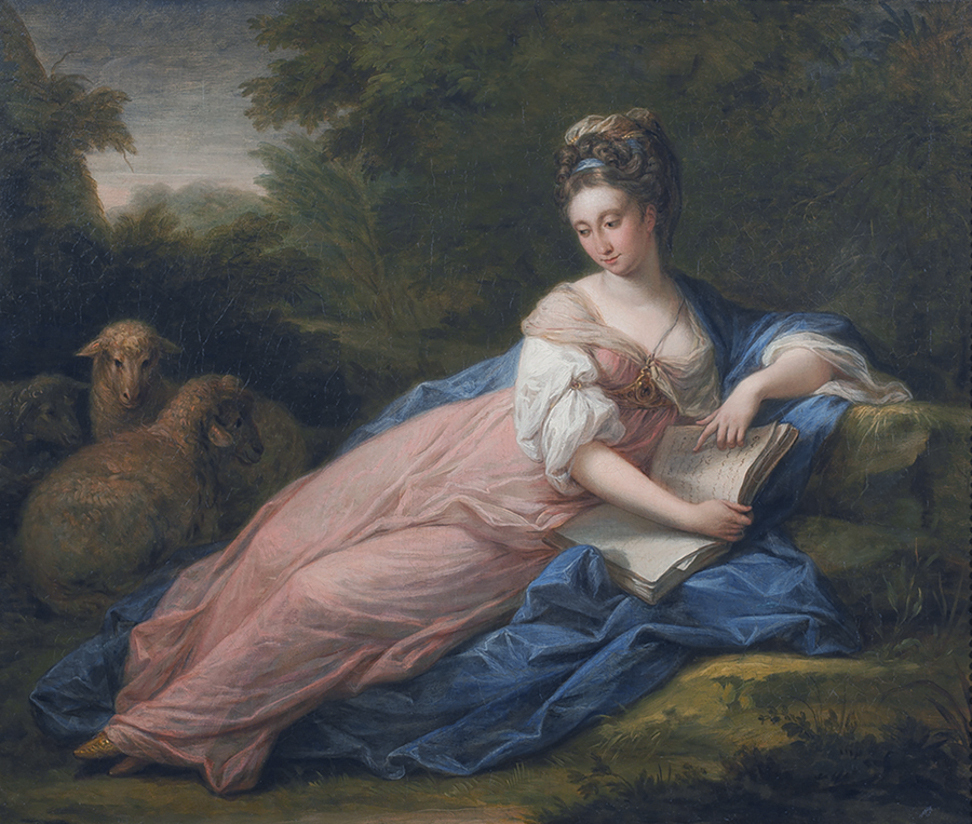
Mary Tisdall (Angelica Kauffmann, ca. 1771/72)

He married in 1736 Mary Singleton, daughter of the Rev. Rowland Singleton and Elizabeth Graham, and niece and co-heiress of Henry Singleton, Chief Justice of the Irish Common Pleas, a marriage which brought him both wealth and influence. They had three daughters:

- Elizabeth, who married Colonel Hugh Morgan of Cottlestown, County Sligo, and had issue
- Alicia, who married Thomas Meredyth: they were the parents of Sir John Meredyth, first of the Meredyth baronets of Carlandstown, County Meath
- Mary, who died unmarried.

Mary Singleton Tisdall (nicknamed "la belle Marie") was renowned for her beauty and as a patron of the arts. In particular, she was one of the principal Irish patrons of the celebrated Swiss painter Angelica Kauffman, who visited the Tisdalls regularly in Dublin in the early 1770s and painted Philip, Mary and their daughters.

== Character ==
He was strikingly dark in complexion, hence his nicknames "Black Phil" and "Philip the Moor", and was described as "grave in manner and sardonic in temper". Despite his somewhat forbidding appearance, he was a hospitable character, who was noted for entertaining lavishly, even when he was well into his seventies, both at his Dublin house in South Leinster Street, and his country house at Stillorgan (now a suburb of Dublin). Even by Irish standards, he was a heavy drinker, although accounts of his consuming eight bottles of wine a day are barely credible (admittedly a bottle of wine then held a good deal less than its modern equivalent). John Scott, 1st Earl of Clonmell, who succeeded him as Attorney General, wrote that he would have lived longer if he had adopted a more sedate lifestyle in his later years (although Scott did not take his own good advice, dying from the effects of over-indulgence in food and drink at fifty-eight). Tisdall did much to foster the career of the rising young lawyer and orator Walter Hussey Burgh, and it was through his influence that Burgh became Prime Serjeant in 1776.

By his own wish, all his papers were destroyed after his death.

== Links ==
- leighrayment.com
- leighrayment.com

Parliament of Ireland
Preceded by Marmaduke Coghill; John Elwood	Member of Parliament for Dublin University; 1739–1776; With: John Elwood 1739–1741; Sir Archibald Acheson 1741–1761; William Clement 1761–1768; Sir Capel Molyneux 1768–1776	Succeeded by Walter Hussey Burgh; Richard Hely-Hutchinson
Preceded by Robert Cuninghame; Hon. Barry Maxwell	Member of Parliament for Armagh Borough; 1768–1769; With: George Macartney	Succeeded by George Macartney; Charles O'Hara
Preceded by George Macartney; Charles O'Hara	Member of Parliament for Armagh Borough; 1776–1777; With: Henry Meredyth	Succeeded by Henry Meredyth; George Rawson
Legal offices
Preceded by Warden Flood	Solicitor-General for Ireland; 1751–1760	Succeeded by John Gore
Preceded by Warden Flood	Attorney-General for Ireland; 1760–1777	Succeeded by John Scott
Political offices
Preceded by Thomas Carter	Principal Secretary of State; 1763–1777	Succeeded by John Hely-Hutchinson
