= Thomas Carter (died 1726) =

Irish politician

Thomas Carter (c. 1650 – August 1726) was an Irish politician. He was a Member of Parliament (MP) for the borough of Fethard in County Tipperary from 1695 to 1703, and for Portarlington from 1703 to 1713.

Through his son also named Thomas, they are ancestors of Diana, Princess of Wales, and of her sons, Princes William, the Prince of Wales, and Harry, Duke of Sussex.

Parliament of Ireland
Preceded by Thomas Clere; Richard Sankey	Member of Parliament for Fethard, Tipperary; 1695–1703; With: Matthew Jacob	Succeeded by Epaphroditus Marsh; Matthew Jacob
Preceded by George Warburton; Richard Warburton	Member of Parliament for Portarlington; 1703–1713; With: Richard Warburton	Succeeded by Ephraim Dawson; Richard Warburton
