= Henry Alexander (Irish politician) =

Irish politician (1763-1818)

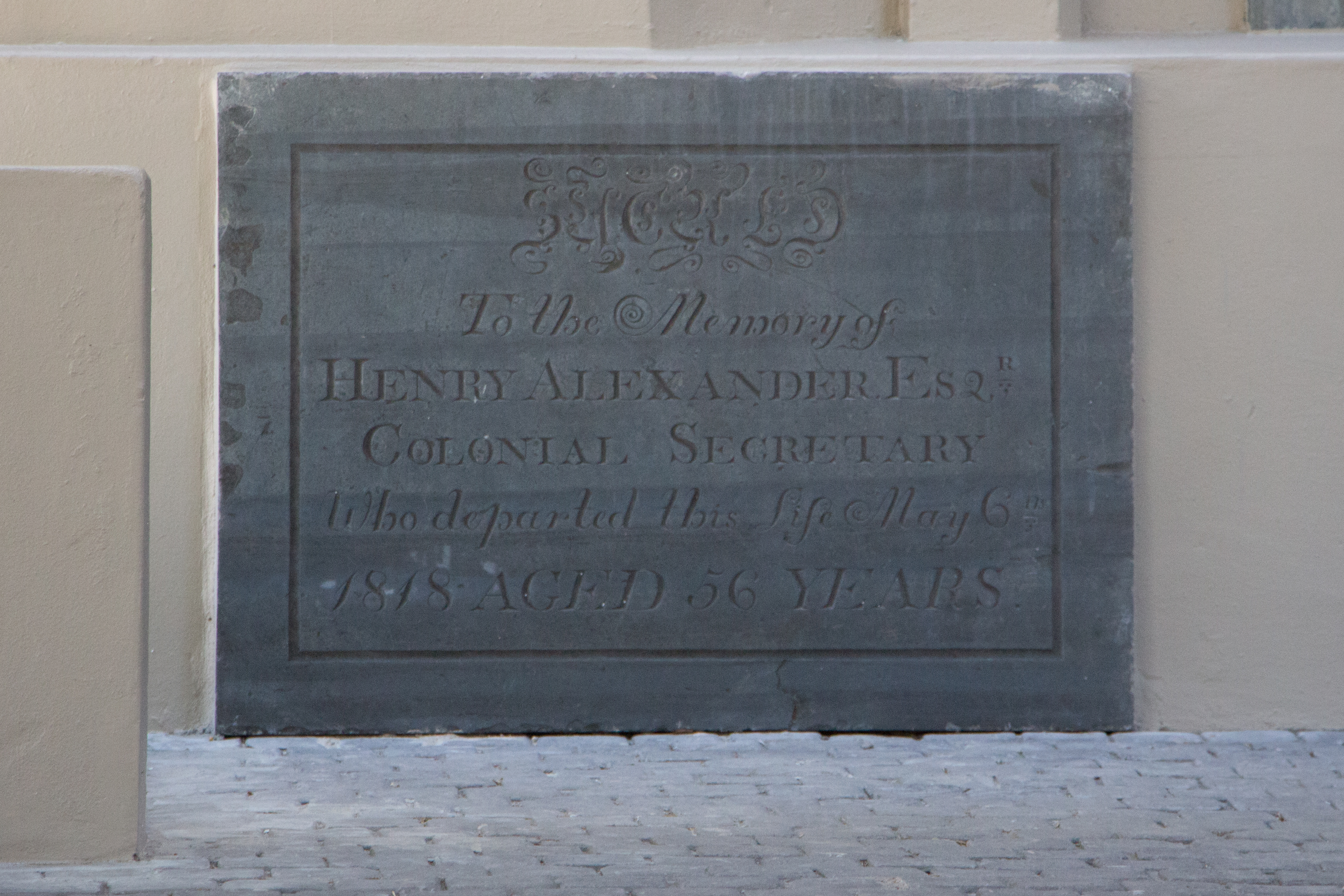
Alexander's gravestone, Groote Kerk, Cape Town

Henry Alexander (1763 – 6 May 1818) was an Irish politician from County Londonderry.

Alexander was educated at Trinity College, Dublin, and sat in the Parliament of Ireland until its abolition under the Act of Union 1800 and then in the Parliament of the United Kingdom. He was returned as a Member of Parliament for the rotten borough of Old Sarum in the 1802 election.

He was the brother of James Alexander, who was also a Member of Parliament for Old Sarum, and who bought the patronage of the borough in 1820 from their cousin, the 2nd Earl of Caledon. He was also the brother of Josias Alexander.

Parliament of Ireland
Preceded by Hon. John Ponsonby; Sir William Morres, Bt	Member of Parliament for Newtownards; 1788–1790; With: Sir William Morres, Bt	Succeeded by John La Touche; Hon. Richard Annesley
Preceded by Richard Griffith; Joseph Hoare	Member of Parliament for Askeaton; 1790–1798; With: Joseph Hoare	Succeeded by John Stewart; Joseph Hoare
Preceded by William Lecky; Sir George Hill, Bt	Member of Parliament for Londonderry City; 1798–1800; With: Sir George Hill, Bt; Sir Andrew Ferguson, Bt	Succeeded by Parliament of the United Kingdom
Parliament of the United Kingdom
Preceded by Parliament of Ireland	Member of Parliament for Londonderry City; 1801–1802	Succeeded by Sir George Fitzgerald Hill, Bt
Preceded by George Hardinge; John Horne Tooke	Member of Parliament for Old Sarum; 1802–1806; With: Nicholas Vansittart	Succeeded by Nicholas Vansittart; The Lord Blayney
