= Sir Redmond Everard, 4th Baronet =

Irish Jacobite politician

Sir Redmond Everard, 4th Baronet (c.1689 – 13 April 1742) was an Irish Jacobite baronet and politician.

== Biography ==
He was the youngest son of Sir John Everard, 3rd Baronet, whose family effectively owned the town of Fethard in County Tipperary. Redmond himself was elected sovereign of Fethard in 1707 under its charter. His mother was the Hon. Eleanor Butler, eldest daughter of Thomas Cahir, 6th Baron Cahir and Elizabeth Matthew. His father was killed at the Battle of Aughrim in 1691 and his estates forfeited as a traitor. After his mother's death shortly afterwards he was brought up by his Protestant relatives, Lady Mary Butler and her husband, William Cavendish, 1st Duke of Devonshire, and conformed to the Protestant faith, although his family had been Roman Catholic for generations. Thanks to the Devonshire influence he was able to recover the lands forfeited on his father's death in 1691. In June 1721 he married Mary Drake, only daughter of Montague Drake of Shardeloes, Buckinghamshire, and Jane Garrard, daughter of Sir John Garrard, 3rd Baronet. They had no children.

He sat in the Irish House of Commons as a Member of Parliament (MP) for Kilkenny City from 1711 to 1713, and for Fethard, County Tipperary from 1713 to 1715. Although he took the Oath of Supremacy to qualify for his seat in Parliament, his loyalty to the House of Hanover was suspect, and with good reason: nicknamed "the little knight", he became a familiar figure in Jacobite cabals. After the failure of the Jacobite rising of 1715, he felt it wise to retire to France, where he settled near Paris; he never returned to Ireland. His status as an absentee landlord caused him considerable financial difficulties, and he eventually sold much of his estate to a Mr. Barton, of the famous Bordeaux wine merchant family.

In June 1723, the claimant King James III & VIII ennobled Everard as Viscount Everard in the Jacobite Peerage. He died in France on 13 April 1742, without heirs: he left his property to his widow Mary for her lifetime, and after her death to James Long, a distant cousin, who belonged to another branch of the Everard family. His titles became extinct on his death.

Parliament of Ireland
Preceded by Viscount Tunbridge; Sir Thomas Smyth, 2nd Bt	Member of Parliament for Kilkenny City; 1711–1713; With: Sir Thomas Smyth, 2nd Bt	Succeeded by Sir Richard Levinge, 1st Bt; Darby Egan
Preceded by Matthew Jacob; Epaphroditus Marsh	Member of Parliament for Fethard, County Tipperary; 1713–1715; With: Cornelius O'Callaghan	Succeeded by Epaphroditus Marsh; Guy Moore
Peerage of Ireland
New creation	— TITULAR — Viscount Everard; Jacobite peerage 1723–1742	Extinct
Baronetage of Ireland
Preceded by John Everard	Baronet (of Ballyboy, County Tipperary); 1690–1742	Extinct
