= Fethard (County Tipperary) (Parliament of Ireland constituency) =

Pre-1801 Irish constituency

Fethard
- Former borough constituency for the Irish House of Commons
- County: County Tipperary
- Borough: Fethard

1608–1801
- Replaced by: Disfranchised

Fethard was a constituency in County Tipperary representing the parliamentary borough of Fethard in the Irish House of Commons until its abolition on 1 January 1801.

== History ==
In the Patriot Parliament of 1689 summoned by James II, Fethard was represented with two members.

== Members of Parliament, 1560–1801 ==
Election	First MP	Second MP
1560	Nicholas Hackett	Theobald Nash
1585	William Nash	David Wale
1613	Edward Everard	Redmond Hackett
1634	Thomas Everard	Thomas Hennes
1639	Thomas Hennes	Patrick Vyne
1661	Nicolas Everard	Sir Maurice Fenton, 1st Baronet
1689	Sir John Everard, Bt	James Tobin
1692	Thomas Clere	Richard Sankey
1695	Matthew Jacob	Thomas Carter
1703	Matthew Jacob	Epaphroditus Marsh
1713	Sir Redmond Everard, 4th Bt	Cornelius O'Callaghan I
1715	Epaphroditus Marsh	Guy Moore
1719	Stephen Moore I	Guy Moore
1727	Matthew Jacob	John Clere
1755	Matthew Jacob	Robert O'Callaghan
1761	Cornelius O'Callaghan II	Stephen Moore II
1768	Cornelius O'Callaghan III later 1st Baron Lismore	John Croker
1776	Cornelius O'Callaghan III later 1st Baron Lismore	David Walsh
1783	Cornelius O'Callaghan III later 1st Baron Lismore	Thomas Barton
1785	Daniel Gahan	Thomas Barton
1798	John Taylor	William Ponsonby
1801	Disenfranchised	

== Bibliography ==
- O'Hart, John (2007). The Irish and Anglo-Irish Landed Gentry: When Cromwell came to Ireland. Vol. II. Heritage Books. ISBN 0-7884-1927-7.
- Leigh Rayment's historical List of Members of the Irish House of Commons. Cites: Johnston-Liik, Edith Mary (2002). The History of the Irish Parliament 1692-1800 (6 volumes). Ulster Historical Foundation.
