= Sir John Everard, 3rd Baronet =

Irish Jacobite soldier and politician

Sir John Everard, 3rd Baronet (c.1665 – 1691) was an Irish Jacobite soldier and politician.

== Biography ==
Everard was the son of Sir Redmond Everard, 2nd Baronet and Elizabeth Butler, and in 1687 he succeeded to his father's baronetcy. He received a commission in the Jacobite army of James II of England as a captain in Nicholas Purcell of Loughmoe's regiment of horse. He was the Member of Parliament for Fethard in the brief Patriot Parliament called by James II in 1689. On 12 July 1691 he was killed in fighting during the Battle of Aughrim and was posthumously attainted and forfeited of his estates.

He married Hon. Eleanor Butler, eldest daughter of Thomas Cahir, 6th Baron Cahir and Elizabeth Matthew. Their son, Redmond Everard, was raised by relatives as a Protestant and subsequently recovered his family's seized estates.

Parliament of Ireland
Preceded by Nicolas Everard; Sir Maurice Fenton, Bt	Member of Parliament for Fethard; 1689; With: James Tobin	Succeeded by Thomas Clere; Richard Sankey
Baronetage of Ireland
Preceded by Redmond Everard	Baronet (of Ballyboy); 1687–1691	Succeeded by Redmond Everard
