= David Blundy =

British journalist (1945–1989)

David Michael Blundy
- Born: 21 March 1945; Slinfold, West Sussex
- Died: 17 November 1989 (aged 44); San Salvador, El Salvador
- Cause of death: Killed in action (heart attack caused by gunshot wounds)
- Resting place: Highgate Cemetery, north London
- Education: City of London School
- Alma mater: Bristol University
- Occupation: journalist
- Notable work: Qaddafi and the Libyan Revolution (1987); With Geldof in Africa: Behind the Famine (1985)
- Spouses: Ruth Mansley; Samira Osman

David Michael Blundy (21 March 1945 – 17 November 1989), was a British journalist and war correspondent killed by a sniper at the age of 44 in El Salvador. Blundy was the Washington reporter for the London Sunday Correspondent newspaper. He was in El Salvador covering the latest fighting in the area. He covered stories in Northern Ireland, the Middle East, and Central America.

== Early and personal life ==
Blundy was born in Slinfold, West Sussex, England in the United Kingdom. He grew up in south London near the intersection of Elephant and Castle in a house that was also the location of his father's antique shop. He went to the City of London School, and then went on to study English and philosophy at Bristol University. He began work with Thomson Newspapers, but then went to The Sunday Times. He left the Times to become The Sunday Telegraph's Washington correspondent in 1986. In 1989, he began the same position for the Sunday Correspondent. He married Ruth Mansley in 1970, and had one daughter with her. He had another daughter from a relationship with Samira Osman. His two daughters are Anna Blundy and Charlotte Blundy.

His funeral service was held at St Michael's Church, Highgate, north London, and he is buried on the eastern side of Highgate Cemetery.

== Career ==
His career began with a place in the graduate training scheme of Thomson Newspapers. He went from Burnley to Hemel Hempstead before reaching Fleet Street in 1970. Michael Bateman, who wrote The Sunday Times Atticus column, offered him the position of assistant. He was sent to New York as a correspondent, but then was based in the Middle East. He left The Sunday Times for The Sunday Telegraph in 1986 as their Washington correspondent. Earlier in 1989, he took the same position with The Sunday Correspondent.

== Death ==
Blundy died in El Salvador on 17 November 1989 by a sniper's bullet.

=== Incident ===
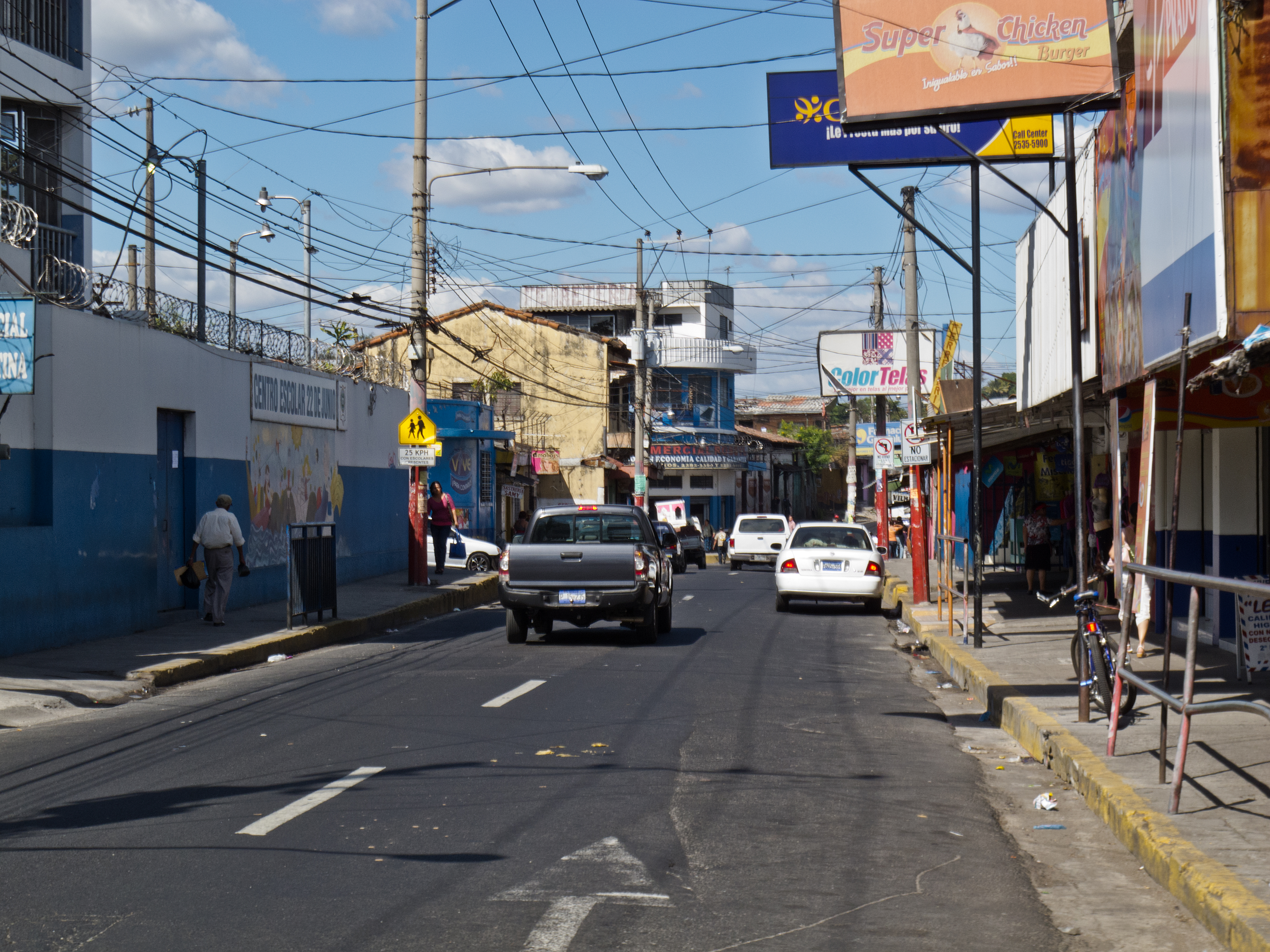
Street scene of Mexicanos, El Salvador

Mejicanos is located in San Salvador, El Salvador.

Blundy was in El Salvador covering a military offensive when he was shot by a sniper while walking down the street with other reporters. The group of reporters was walking in the working-class district of Mejicanos, that had recently been retaken by the army. Gun-fire was being exchanged four blocks away. No one knows who fired the shot. Blundy was wounded by a single shot in his lungs and spine. He underwent surgery, but died of a heart attack some hours later.

=== Reactions ===
Blundy was well regarded in the journalistic community. He was considered a "reporter's reporter" with a demeanor that intimidated colleagues. He was knowledgeable, successful, and admired. His death brought the number of journalist deaths to 31 in the 10-year civil war in El Salvador.

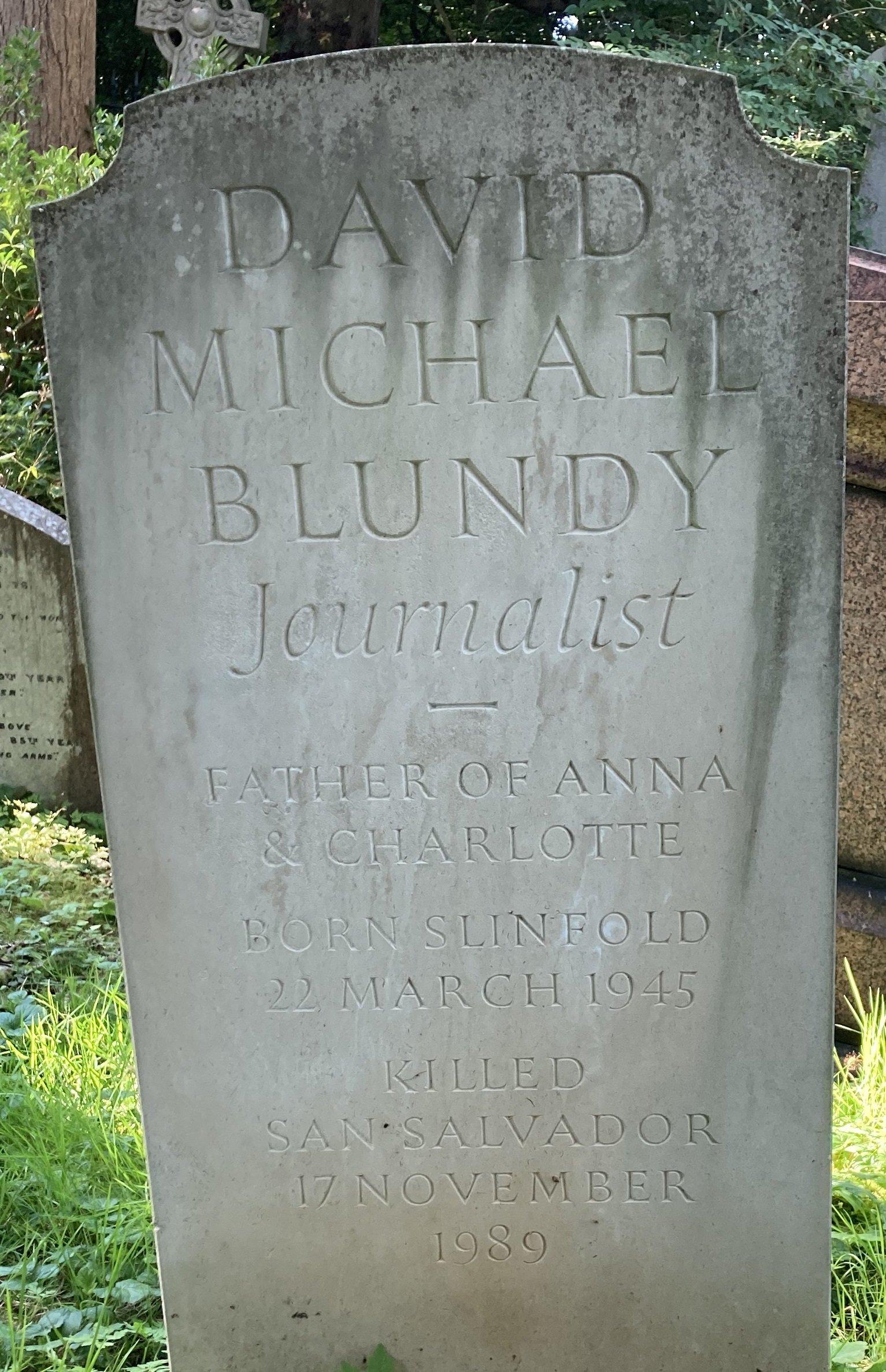
Grave of David Blundy in Highgate Cemetery

== Books ==
- The Last Paragraph. The Journalism of David Blundy (1990) edited by Anthony Holden
- Qaddhafi and the Libyan Revolution (1987) with Andrew Lycett
- With Geldof in Africa (1985) with Paul Vallely and Frank Herrmann.

== See also ==
- Anna Blundy
