= Anna Blundy =

English novelist and journalist

Anna Blundy (born 11 April 1970) is an English novelist and journalist. She was born in London and educated at the City of London School for Girls and Westminster School. Her first book was published in 1998: Every Time We Say Goodbye, a memoir of her father David Blundy, a foreign correspondent killed in El Salvador in 1989. Her series of novels featuring the female war correspondent Faith Zanetti started with The Bad News Bible in 2004. The second in a series, Faith Without Doubt, was published in September 2005. The third in the series, Neat Vodka was published in September 2006 by Little, Brown.

Anna Blundy studied Russian at University College, Oxford. She is a columnist for The Times and was its Moscow Bureau Chief during the 1998–99 financial crisis. She has appeared since 2006 on BBC Television's Newsnight Review and its successor The Review Show.

== Personal life ==
She is an older sister of musician and Clean Bandit cellist Grace Chatto.

== Books ==
- Every Time We Say Goodbye
- Oligarch's Wife
- Only My Dreams

Faith Zanetti novels

1. Bad News Bible
2. Faith Without Doubt
3. Neat Vodka
4. Double Shot, US title: Breaking Faith
5. My Favourite Poison
