= Blunden baronets =

Title in the Baronetage of Ireland

The Blunden Baronetcy, of Castle Blunden, in the County of Kilkenny, is a title in the Baronetage of Ireland, created on 12 March 1766 for John Blunden, who represented Kilkenny City in the Irish House of Commons. He was the son of John Blunden, a Member of Parliament for the same constituency.

== Blunden baronets, of Castle Blunden (1766) ==
Escutcheon of the Blunden baronets of Castle Blunden

- Sir John Blunden, 1st Baronet (died 1783)
- Sir John Blunden, 2nd Baronet (1767–1818)
- Sir John Blunden, 3rd Baronet (1814–1890)
- Sir William Blunden, 4th Baronet (1840–1923)
- Sir John Blunden, 5th Baronet (1880–1923)
- Sir William Blunden, 6th Baronet (1919–1985)
- Sir Philip Overington Blunden, 7th Baronet (1922–2007)
- Sir Hubert Blunden, 8th Baronet (born 1948)
