= Robert O'Callaghan (politician, born 1710) =

Irish politician

Robert O'Callaghan (10 July 1710 – January 1761) was an Irish politician.

He was educated at Trinity College, Dublin. He represented Fethard, Tipperary in the Irish House of Commons between 1755 and 1760.

Parliament of Ireland
Preceded by Matthew Jacob; John Clere	Member of Parliament for Fethard, Tipperary; 1755 – 1760; With: Matthew Jacob	Succeeded by Cornelius O'Callaghan; Stephen Moore
