= Arthur Blunden =

English cricketer

Personal information
- Born: 5 September 1906; East Malling, Kent
- Died: 27 July 1984 (aged 77); Skinburness, Cumbria
- Batting: Right-handed
- Bowling: Right-arm fast-medium

Domestic team information
- Years: Team
- 1931–1933: Kent
- 1938–1939: Durham

Career statistics
Competition	First-class
Matches	11
Runs scored	33
Batting average	4.12
100s/50s	0/0
Top score	9*
Balls bowled	1,589
Wickets	18
Bowling average	32.55
5 wickets in innings	0
10 wickets in match	0
Best bowling	4/31
Catches/stumpings	3/–
- Source: ESPNcricinfo, 10 August 2011

Arthur Blunden (5 September 1906 – 27 July 1984) was a professional English cricketer. Blunden was a right-handed batsman who bowled right-arm fast-medium. He was born in East Malling in Kent in 1906.

Blunden was a fast-medium paced bowler who made his debut for Kent County Cricket Club Second XI in the Minor Counties Championship in 1928 against Norfolk at Foxgrove Road, Beckenham. He made his first-class cricket debut for the county against Marylebone Cricket Club (MCC) at Lord's in 1931, his only senior appearance for the county that season. Blunden made a total of 11 first-class appearances for Kent, nine in 1932 and one in his final season with the county in 1933, again against MCC at Lord's. In his 11 first-class matches for Kent, he took 18 wickets at an average of 32.55, with best figures of 4/31. Blunden also appeared a total of 45 times for Kent Second XI in the Minor Counties Championship.

After leaving Kent Blunden became the professional player at Wearmouth Cricket Club in Sunderland, playing in the Durham Senior League. He played two matches for Durham County Cricket Club in 1938 and appeared twice for the county in the Minor Counties Championship in the 1939 season. He died in Skinburness in Cumbria in 1984 aged 77.

== Bibliography ==
- Carlaw, Derek (2020). Kent County Cricketers, A to Z: Part Two (1919–1939) (PDF). Cardiff: ACS.
