= Blundell =

Blundell is both a surname and a given name. Notable people with the name include:

Surname:

- Bryan Blundell (c. 1675 – 1756), English merchant and philanthropist
- Christine Blundell (born 1961), British make-up artist
- Daphne Blundell (1916–2004), British naval officer
- Denis Blundell (1907–1984), Governor-General of New Zealand
- Dennis Blundell (1921–2003), British speed skater
- Elsie Blundell (born 1990), Labour MP for Heywood and Middleton North
- Sir Francis Blundell, 3rd Baronet (1643–1707), Irish baronet and politician
- Graeme Blundell (born 1945), Australian actor, director, producer, writer and biographer
- Gregg Blundell (born 1977), English footballer
- Hannah Blundell (born 1994), English footballer
- Henry Blundell (art collector) (1724–1810), English art collector
- Henry Blundell (MP) (1831–1906), British MP
- Henry Blundell (publisher) (1813–1878), New Zealand newspaper publisher
- James Blundell (physician) (1791–1878), British obstetrician
- James Blundell (singer) (born 1964), Australian country music singer
- John Blundell (actor), British actor
- John Blundell (economist) (1952–2014), Director General at the Institute of Economic Affairs
- Katherine Blundell, Professor of Astrophysics at the University of Oxford
- Margaret Blundell (1907–1996), British artist
- Mark Blundell (born 1966), former Formula One, sports car, and CART racing driver
- Mary Blundell (1859–1930), novelist
- Peter Blundell (c. 1520 – 1601), prosperous clothier
- Reginald Blundell (20th century), Australian politician
- Rex Blundell (1942–2024), Australian cricketer
- Richard Blundell (born 1952), British economist
- Stephen Blundell (21st century), experimental physicist
- Tom Blundell (born 1942), British biologist
- Tom Blundell (born 1990), New Zealand cricketer
- William Blundell (1946–2023), Australian painter and art forger
- William R. C. Blundell (1927–2023), Canadian businessman

Given name:

- Peter Blundell Jones (21st century), British architect, historian, academic and critic
- Sir John Blundell Maple, 1st Baronet (1845–1903), English business magnate
- William Blundell Spence (1814–1900), English artist and art dealer

== See also ==
- Blundell Park
- Ince Blundell
- Blundellsands
- Viscount Blundell
