= Robert O'Callaghan (British Army officer) =

British general and Irish politician

Lieutenant-General The Honourable Sir Robert O'Callaghan GCB
- Born: October 1777
- Died: 9 June 1840 (aged 62); Clarges Street, London
- Relatives: Cornelius O'Callaghan, 1st Baron Lismore (father); Frances Ponsonby (mother); Sir William Ponsonby (cousin)
- Military career
- Allegiance: United Kingdom
- Branch: British Army
- Service years: 1794–1840
- Rank: Lieutenant-General
- Commands: 39th Regiment of Foot; 3rd Brigade, 2nd Division; 13th Brigade, 7th Division; 3rd Brigade, AOOF; 7th Brigade, AOOF; Scotland Command; Madras Army
- Conflicts: French Revolutionary Wars; Irish Rebellion of 1798; Egypt campaign; Napoleonic Wars; Invasion of Naples; Battle of Maida; Peninsular War; Siege of Badajoz; Battle of Vitoria; Battle of Maya; Battle of Nivelle; Battle of the Nive; Battle of Garris (WIA); Battle of Orthes; Battle of Toulouse; Coorg War
- Awards: Army Gold Cross with two clasps

Lieutenant-General Sir Robert William O'Callaghan GCB (October 1777 – 9 June 1840) was a British Army officer and politician.

== Career ==
Born the son of Cornelius O'Callaghan, 1st Baron Lismore, O'Callaghan was commissioned into the 128th Regiment of Foot in 1794. He served in the Peninsular War and temporarily commanded a brigade within the 2nd Division between January and July 1813 and permanently commanded a brigade of the 2nd Division between February and April 1814. He went on to command the 13th Brigade in France in 1815, the 3rd Brigade between 1815 and 1817 and the 7th Brigade in 1818. He served with the Army of Occupation in France and then became Commander-in-Chief, Scotland in 1825 and Commander-in-Chief of the Madras Army in 1831 before retiring in 1836.

He sat in the Irish House of Commons as the Member of Parliament for Bandonbridge from 1798 to 1800.

He was also colonel of the 97th Regiment of Foot and then of the 39th Regiment of Foot. He died unmarried in London.

Parliament of Ireland
Preceded by William Ponsonby	Member of Parliament for Bandonbridge; 1798 – 1801; With: Broderick Chinnery	Succeeded by Parliament of the United Kingdom
Military offices
Preceded by Sir Thomas Bradford	Commander-in-Chief, Scotland; 1825–1830	Succeeded by The Hon. Patrick Stuart
Preceded by Sir George Walker	C-in-C, Madras Army; 1831–1836	Succeeded by Sir Peregrine Maitland
Preceded by Sir George Airey	Colonel of 39th (Dorsetshire) Regiment of Foot; 1833–1840	Succeeded by Sir Frederick Philipse Robinson
Preceded by Sir James Frederick Lyon	Colonel of the 97th (The Earl of Ulster's) Regiment of Foot; 1829–1833	Succeeded by Sir Henry Hardinge, 1st Viscount Hardinge
