= John Ponsonby (politician) =

Anglo-Irish politician (1713–1787)

The Right Honourable John Ponsonby
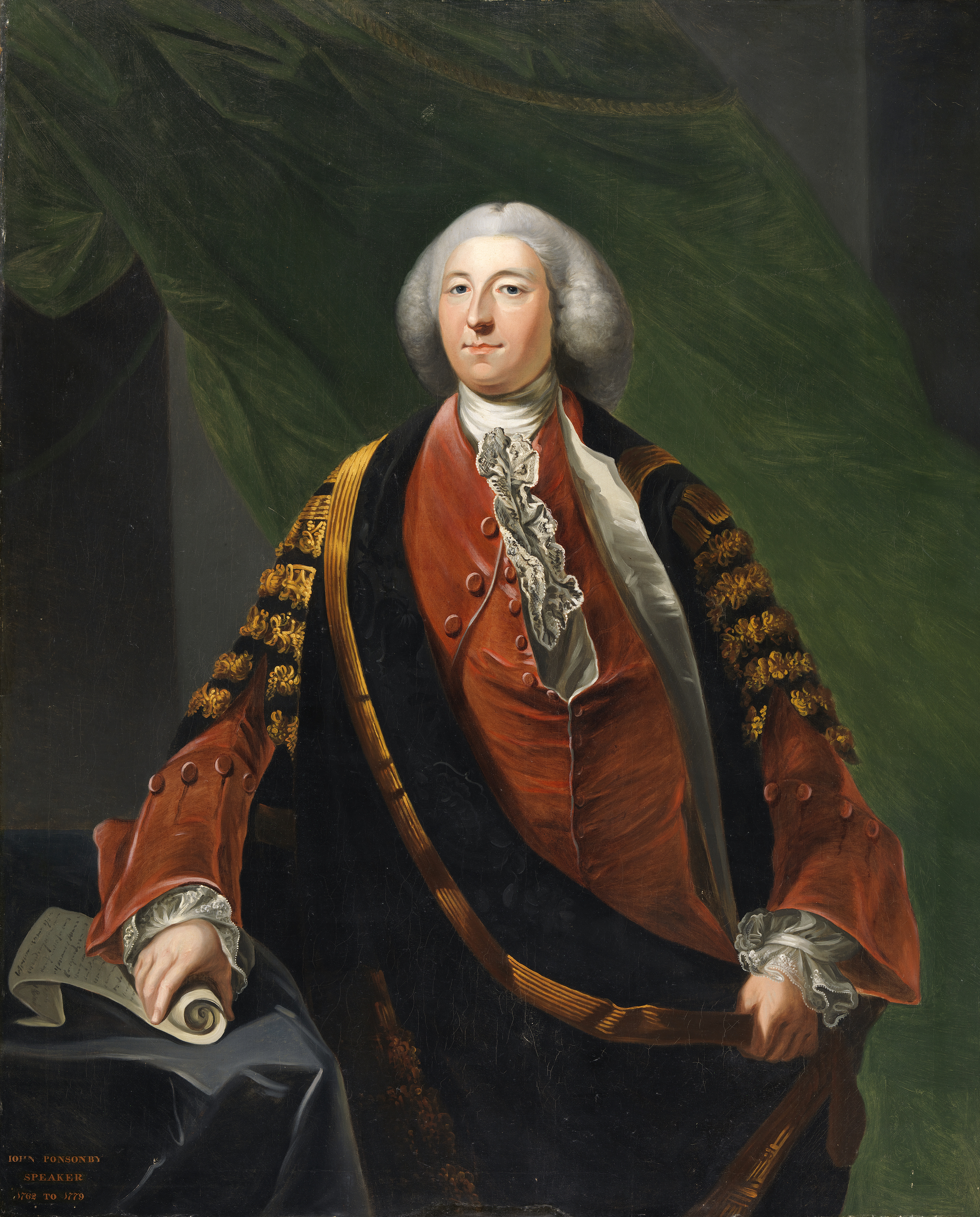
- Portrait by Jacob Ennis, c. 1772

Speaker of the Irish House of Commons
- In office 1756–1771
- Monarch: George III
- Preceded by: Henry Boyle
- Succeeded by: Edmund Sexton Pery

Personal details
- Born: 29 March 1713
- Died: 16 August 1787 (aged 74)
- Spouse: Lady Elizabeth Cavendish (m. 1743)
- Children: 5, including William and George

John Ponsonby, PC (Ire) (29 March 1713 – 16 August 1787) was an Anglo-Irish politician. He was Speaker of the Irish House of Commons between 1756 and 1771, a period in which the legislative independence of the Kingdom of Ireland was increasingly asserted and tested.

== Early life ==
Ponsonby was the second son of Brabazon Ponsonby, who was created the Earl of Bessborough in 1739, and his first wife, Sarah Margetson Colvill. He was the grandson of William Ponsonby, 1st Viscount Duncannon. He was admitted to Trinity College Dublin on 6 April 1730, but there is no evidence that he ever graduated.

== Parliamentary career ==
In 1739, Ponsonby entered the Irish House of Commons for Newtownards and was soon aligned to his father's faction, which sought to reduce the influence of Henry Boyle. When Boyle resigned as speaker in 1756, Ponsonby was the only credible alternative and he was elected speaker unopposed. He was re-elected to the chair in 1761 and 1769. He also served as First Commissioner of the Revenue and he became a member of the Privy Council of Ireland in 1746. In 1761, Ponsonby was elected for County Kilkenny and Armagh, and sitting for the former. In 1768, he stood also for Gowran and Newtownards, and in 1776 for Carlow, but chose each time County Kilkenny, which he represented until 1783. Subsequently, Ponsonby was again returned for Newtownards and sat for this constituency until his death in 1787.

Belonging to one of the great families which at this time monopolized the government of Ireland, Ponsonby was one of the principal "undertakers" – men who controlled the whole of the king's business in Ireland. Ponsonby ensured that he, as speaker, had direct input into the business of government. He employed patronage in the Commons to ensure that his supporters remained loyal and used his office to give credence to the growing Irish Patriot sentiment of the 1760s. He retained the chief authority until George Townshend, 1st Marquess Townshend, became lord-lieutenant in 1767. Then followed a struggle for supremacy between the Ponsonby faction and the Dublin Castle administration party dependent on Townshend, which sought to implement a more assertive Irish executive aligned with London's interests. In November 1769, Ponsonby voted in favour of a patriot motion rejecting a privy council money bill, prompting Townshend to dismiss him his role in the revenue. In 1770 he failed to respond to a proposal by Lord Charlemont to coordinate the opposition to Townshend. After Irish MPs voted to express their approval of the king's decision in 1771 to retain Townshend in office, Ponsonby impulsively resigned the speakership.

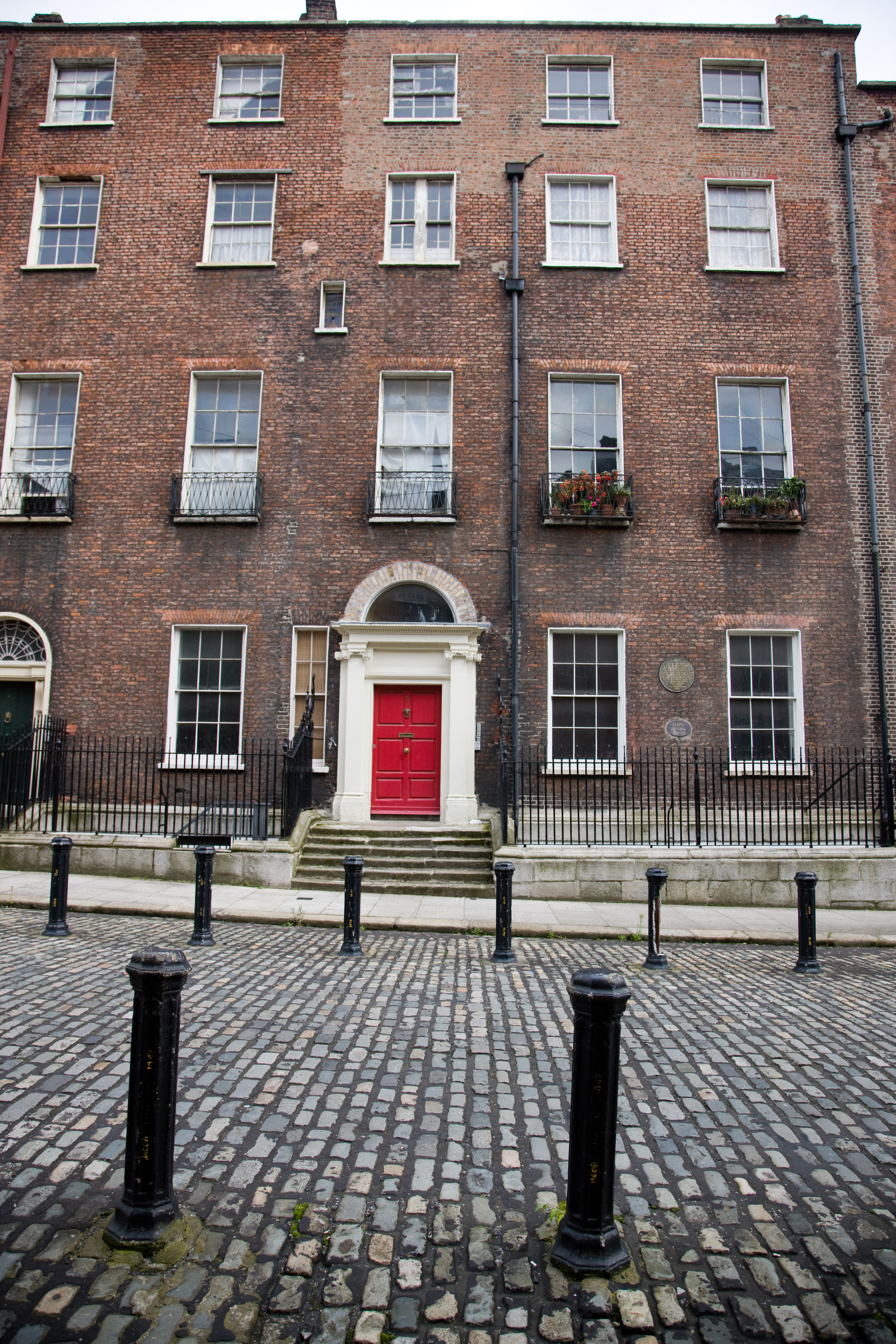
Ponsonby's townhouse in Henrietta Street, Dublin

Many of Ponsonby's former allies in the Commons chose to make their peace with the Irish administration, but Ponsonby himself remained in opposition. In 1776 he again stood for election as speaker, but was defeated by the popular incumbent, Edmund Sexton Pery. Ponsonby died, while still a member of parliament, on 16 August 1787.

== Marriage and issue ==
He married in 1743 Lady Elizabeth Cavendish, daughter of the 3rd Duke of Devonshire, a connection which was of great importance to the Ponsonbys. His older brother, William Ponsonby, 2nd Earl of Bessborough, had married the Duke's eldest daughter in 1739. Ponsonby's sons, William Ponsonby, 1st Baron Ponsonby of Imokilly, and George Ponsonby, were also politicians of distinction. His daughter Catherine married Richard Boyle, 2nd Earl of Shannon, and was mother to Henry Boyle, 3rd Earl of Shannon.

Parliament of Ireland
Preceded by Sir John Vesey, 2nd Bt; Robert Jocelyn	Member of Parliament for Newtownards; 1739–1760; With: Sir John Vesey, 2nd Bt 1739–1750; Chambre Brabazon Ponsonby 1750–1760	Succeeded by Richard Ponsonby; Redmond Morres
Preceded by Henry Flood; Patrick Wemys	Member of Parliament for County Kilkenny; 1761–1783; With: James Agar 1761–1776; Hon. Edmund Butler 1776–1779; Joseph Deane 1779–1783	Succeeded by William Brabazon Ponsonby; Hon. Henry Welbore Agar
Preceded by Edward Knatchbull; Francis Russell, Marquess of Tavistock	Member of Parliament for Armagh Borough; 1761; With: Robert Cuninghame	Succeeded by Robert Cuninghame; Hon. Barry Maxwell
Preceded by George Dunbar; William Henry Burton	Member of Parliament for Gowran; 1768–1769; With: James Agar	Succeeded by Arthur Browne; Henry Prittie
Preceded by Richard Ponsonby; Redmond Morres	Member of Parliament for Newtownards; 1768–1769; With: Thomas Le Hunt	Succeeded by Thomas Le Hunt; Sir William Morres, 1st Bt
Preceded by Edward Hoare; James Somerville	Member of Parliament for Carlow; 1776; With: John Prendergast	Succeeded by John Prendergast; Arthur Dawson
Preceded by William Brabazon Ponsonby; Lodge Evans Morres	Member of Parliament for Newtownards; 1783–1787; With: George Lowther 1783–1785; Sir William Morres, 3rd Bt 1785–1787	Succeeded by Henry Alexander; Sir William Morres, 3rd Bt
Political offices
Preceded by Henry Boyle	Speaker of the Irish House of Commons; 1756–1771	Succeeded by Edmund Sexton Pery
