= Hervey de Montmorency, 4th Viscount Mountmorres =

Irish dean, peer (1796–1872)

Hervey de Montmorency, 4th Viscount Mountmorres (August 20, 1796 - 24 January 1872) was the Dean of Cloyne from 1845 until 1850 when he was appointed Dean of Achonry, a post he held until his death in 1872.

He was educated at Trinity College, Dublin. He published "A Brief Notice of the Past and Present Parties, the chief doctrines of the Established Church, and subscription to the Articles, especially in relation to Ireland" in 1842.

Peerage of Ireland
Preceded by Francis Hervey de Montmorency	Viscount Mountmorres; 1833–1872	Succeeded by William Browne de Montmorency
