= Newtownards (Parliament of Ireland constituency) =

Pre-1801 Irish constituency

Coordinates: 54.595°N 5.703°W

- Former borough constituency for the Irish House of Commons
- County: County Down
- Borough: Newtownards

–1801
- Replaced by: Disfranchised

Newtownards was a constituency represented in the Irish House of Commons until 1800.

== Members of Parliament ==
=== 1613–1801 ===
The town was incorporated on 1 April 1613 and a privilege of that incorporation was to send two burgesses to serve as members of Parliament. Members of Parliament from 1613 to 1800 inclusive:

Election	First MP	Second MP
1613	George Conyngham, Loghriscoll	James Cathcart, Ballenyane
1634	Hugh Montgomery, Master of the Ardes	Edward Trevor
1639	Hugh Montgomery	John Trevor, Balleclender
1640 (February)	George Montgomery, Ballylessan	John Trevor, Balleclender
1640 (March)	George Montgomery	
1661	William Montgomery, Rosemount	Charles Campbell, Donaghadee, Dublin
1692	Robert Echlin	Thomas Knox
1695	Clotworthy Upton	Charles Campbell
1703	George Carpenter	Charles Campbell
1705	Brabazon Ponsonby	Charles Campbell
1715	Richard Tighe	Charles Campbell
1725	Richard Tighe	William Ponsonby
1727	John Denny Vesey	Robert Jocelyn
1739	John Denny Vesey	John Ponsonby
1750	Chambre Brabazon Ponsonby	John Ponsonby
1761	Richard Ponsonby	Redmond Morres
1768	Thomas Le Hunt	John Ponsonby
1769	Thomas Le Hunt	Sir William Morres, 1st Bt
1775	Cornelius O'Callaghan	Arthur Dawson
1776	Sir John Browne, 7th Bt	James Somerville
October 1783	William Brabazon Ponsonby	Lodge Evans Morres
1783	John Ponsonby	George Lowther
1785	John Ponsonby	Sir William Morres, 3rd Bt
1788	Henry Alexander	Sir William Morres, 3rd Bt
1790	Richard Annesley	John I La Touche
1796	Richard Annesley	John II La Touche
1798	Sir John Blaquiere, 1st Bt	Robert Alexander
1800	Sir John Blaquiere, 1st Bt	Du Pré Alexander
1801	Constituency disenfranchised	
