= Kilkenny City (Parliament of Ireland constituency) =

Pre-1801 Irish constituency

- Former borough constituency for the Irish House of Commons
- County: County Kilkenny
- Borough: Kilkenny

–1801
- Seats: 2
- Replaced by: Kilkenny City

Kilkenny City was a constituency represented in the Irish House of Commons until its abolition in 1800.

== History ==
In the Patriot Parliament of 1689 summoned by James II, Kilkenny City was represented with two members.

== Members of Parliament ==
- 1374 William de Karlell
- 1374 John de Karlell
- 1376: Robert Flode and John Ledrede were elected to come to England to consult with the king and council about the government of Ireland and about an aid for the king.
- 1450 John Chevir
- 1560 Robert Shee and Walter Archer
- 1585 John Rothe of Rothe House and Ellice Shee
- 1613–1615 Patrick Archer and Nicholas Langton
- 1634–1635 Robert Shee and David Rothe
- 1639–1649 Peter Rothe and Henry Archer
- 1661–1666 Abel Warren (expelled and replaced 1665 by Sir Thomas Longville) and Thomas Evans

=== 1689–1801 ===
Election	First MP	Second MP
1689	John Rooth	James Bryan
1692	Josiah Haydock	Robert Smith
1695	Ebenezer Warren	Standish Hartstonge (died 1704)
1703	Sir Thomas Smyth, 2nd Bt	Standish Hartstonge (died 1704)
1705	Sir Thomas Smyth, 2nd Bt	Viscount Tunbridge
1711	Sir Thomas Smyth, 2nd Bt	Sir Redmond Everard, 4th Bt
1713	Sir Richard Levinge, 1st Bt	Darby Egan (Note: Declared not duly elected in 1715)
November 1715	Ebenezer Warren	Darby Egan
1715	Ebenezer Warren	Maurice Cuffe
1721	Edward Warren	Maurice Cuffe
1727	William Gore	John Blunden
1748	Ralph Gore	John Blunden
1752	Ralph Gore	William Evans Morres (Note: Created a baronet in 1758)
1761	John Blunden (Note: Created a baronet in 1766)	William Evans Morres
1768	John Blunden	Haydocke Evans Morres (Note: Succeeded as 2nd Baronet in 1774)
1776	Ralph Gore	Haydocke Evans Morres
1777	Ralph Gore	Eland Mossom
May 1778	Charles Agar (Note: Declared not duly elected in 1778)	Eland Mossom
July 1778	Gervase Parker Bushe	Eland Mossom
1783	William Cuffe	John Butler
1792	William Cuffe	Hon. John Wandesford Butler
1793	James Wemys	Hon. John Wandesford Butler
March 1796	James Wemys	Hon. James Wandesford Butler
1796	James Wemys	Bryan Kavanagh
1798	James Wemys	Thomas Kavanagh
1799	James Wemys	William Talbot
1801	Succeeded by the Westminster constituency Kilkenny City	

== Bibliography ==
- O'Hart, John (2007). The Irish and Anglo-Irish Landed Gentry: When Cromwell came to Ireland. Vol. II. Heritage Books. ISBN 978-0-7884-1927-0.
- Leigh Rayment's historical List of Members of the Irish House of Commons. Cites: Johnston-Liik, Edith Mary (2002). The History of the Irish Parliament 1692-1800 (6 volumes). Ulster Historical Foundation.
- Clarke, Maude V. (1932–34). "William of Windsor in Ireland, 1369-1376". Proceedings of the Royal Irish Academy: Archaeology, Culture, History, Literature. 41: 55–130. JSTOR 25515963.
