= Philip Bragg =

Irish soldier, British Army general

Philip Bragg (died 6 June 1759) was an Irish lieutenant-general, colonel 28th foot, and M.P. for Armagh City.

== Life ==
Bragg was at the Battle of Blenheim in the 1st Foot Guards on 10 March 1702. He appears to have afterward served in the 24th Foot, distinguished in all Marlborough's subsequent campaigns under the command of Colonel Gilbert Primrose, who came from the same regiment of guards. The English records of this period contain no reference to Bragg, but in a set of Irish military entry-books, commencing in 1713, which are preserved in the Four Courts, Dublin, his name appears as captain in Primrose's regiment, lately returned from Holland to Ireland; his commission is here dated 1 June 1715, on which day new commissions were issued to all officers in the regiment in consequence of the accession of George I.

On 12 June 1732 Bragg was appointed master of the Royal Hospital, Kilmainham, in succession to Major-General Robert Stearne, deceased, and on 16 December following he became lieutenant-colonel of Colonel Robert Hargeave's regiment, afterwards known as the 31st Foot. On 10 October 1734 he succeeded Major-General Nicholas Price as colonel of the 28th Foot, an appointment which he held for twenty-five years, and which originated the name "The Old Braggs", by which that regiment was popularly known.

As a brigadier-general Bragg accompanied Lord Stair to Flanders, where he commanded a brigade. He became a lieutenant-general in 1747, and in 1751 was appointed to the staff in Ireland. He died at Dublin, at an advanced age, on 6 June 1759. leaving the bulk of his fortune of £7,000 to Lord George Sackville.
