= Hervey Morres, 1st Viscount Mountmorres =

Irish politician and landowner

Hervey Morres, 1st Viscount Mountmorres (1707 – 6 April 1766), was an Irish landowner and politician.

Morres was the son of Francis Morris, of Castle Morres, County Kilkenny, by Catherine Evans, daughter of Sir William Evans, 1st Baronet. His grandfather Hervey Morres, Member of parliament for Knocktoper, was a younger son of Sir Redmond Morres, 2nd Baronet, of Knockagh. Hervey's elder brother was Sir William Morres, 1st Baronet, Member of Parliament for County Kilkenny and Newtownards, while Lodge de Montmorency, 1st Viscount Frankfort de Montmorency, was his nephew. Morres was educated at Trinity College Dublin. He was returned to the Irish House of Commons for St Canice (also known as Irishtown) in 1734, a seat he held until 1756. He was also Mayor of Kilkenny between 1752 and 1753.

In 1756 he was elevated to the Peerage of Ireland as Baron Mountmorres, of Castlemorres in the County of Kilkenny. He was further honoured in 1763 when he was made Viscount Mountmorres, of Castlemorres in the County of Kilkenny, also in the Irish peerage. In 1751 he commissioned the building of Castle Morres, one of the largest stately homes in Ireland. It was acquired in the 1920s by the Irish Land Commission, became a ruin without a roof in the 1930s and was demolished in 1978. A gatelodge is now all that remains of the structure.

== Marriages and succession ==
Lord Mountmorres married Lady Letitia Ponsonby, daughter of Brabazon Ponsonby, 1st Earl of Bessborough, in 1742. After her death in February 1754, he married Mary Wall, daughter of William Wall, of Coolnmuckty Castle, County Waterford, and widow of John Baldwin, in 1755. There were children from both marriages. Mountmorres died in April 1766 and was succeeded in his titles by his son from his first marriage, Hervey. Through his daughter Letitia, Lord Mountmorres was the 4th great grandfather of the UK prime minister Winston Churchill. The Viscountess Mountmorres died in September 1779.

Parliament of Ireland
Preceded by Richard Dawson; Richard Reade	Member of Parliament for St Canice; 1734–1756; With: Richard Dawson	Succeeded by Richard Dawson; Viscount Moore
Peerage of Ireland
New creation	Viscount Mountmorres; 1763–1766	Succeeded by Hervey Redmond Morres
New creation	Baron Mountmorres; 1756–1766	Succeeded by Hervey Redmond Morres
