= Sir John Blunden, 1st Baronet =

Irish baronet and politician

Sir John Blunden, 1st Baronet (c. 1718 – January 1783) was an Irish baronet and politician.

He was the only son of John Blunden and his wife Martha Cuffe, daughter of Agmondesham Cuffe. In 1739, Blunden was called to the bar at the Middle Temple and worked then as barrister. He was appointed Mayor of Kilkenny in 1753 and served as recorder of that city until his death.

Blunden entered the Irish House of Commons in 1761, sitting for Kilkenny City, the same constituency his father had also represented, until 1776. On 12 March 1766, he was created a baronet, of Blunden Castle, in the County of Kilkenny.

On 25 February 1755, he married his cousin Susanna, daughter of John Cuffe, 1st Baron Desart and had by her three sons and four daughters. Blunden died at Castle Blunden in 1783 and was succeeded in the baronetcy by his oldest son John. His third son Overington was a general in the British Army and sat in the Parliament of the United Kingdom.

Parliament of Ireland
Preceded by Ralph Gore; Sir William Morres, Bt	Member of Parliament for Kilkenny City; 1761 – 1776; With: Sir William Morres, Bt 1761–1768; Haydocke Evans Morres 1768–1776	Succeeded by Ralph Gore; Sir Haydocke Morres, Bt
Baronetage of Ireland
New creation	Baronet (of Castle Blunden); 1766 – 1783	Succeeded by John Blunden
