= John Blunden (politician) =

Irish politician

John Blunden (c. 1695 – 8 January 1752) was an Irish politician.

He was named after his father and entered the Irish House of Commons in 1727, sitting for Kilkenny City until his death in 1752. Blunden married Martha Cuffe, only surviving daughter of Agmondesham Cuffe and sister of John Cuffe, 1st Baron Desart and had by her five sons. His only surviving son John succeeded his father as Member of Parliament.

Parliament of Ireland
Preceded by Edward Warren; William Gore	Member of Parliament for Kilkenny City; 1727–1752; With: William Gore 1727–1748; Ralph Gore 1748–1752	Succeeded by Ralph Gore; William Evans Morres
