= Sir William Morres, 1st Baronet =

Anglo-Irish politician

Sir William Evans Morres, 1st Baronet (1710 – 11 October 1774) was an Anglo-Irish politician.

== Biography ==
Morres was the son of Francis Morris, of Castle Morres, County Kilkenny, by Catherine Evans, daughter of Sir William Evans, 1st Baronet. His younger brother was Hervey Morres, who was raised to the Peerage of Ireland as Baron Mountmorres in 1765.

Morres was High Sheriff of Kilkenny City in 1736 and High Sheriff of County Kilkenny in 1741. He was knighted on 28 May 1755. He represented Kilkenny City in the Irish House of Commons from 1752 to 1768, before sitting for Newtownards between 1769 and his death in 1774. Morres was created a baronet, of Upper Wood in the Baronetage of Ireland on 24 April 1758. He was succeeded in his title by his son, Haydock Morres.

Parliament of Ireland
Preceded by Ralph Gore; John Blunden	Member of Parliament for Kilkenny City; 1752–1768; With: Ralph Gore (1752–1761); John Blunden (1761–1768)	Succeeded by John Blunden; Haydock Morres
Preceded by Thomas Le Hunt; Hon. John Ponsonby	Member of Parliament for Newtownards; 1769–1774; With: Thomas Le Hunt	Succeeded by Cornelius O'Callaghan; Arthur Dawson
Baronetage of Ireland
New creation	Baronet (of Upper Wood); 1758–1774	Succeeded by Haydock Morres
