= Lodge de Montmorency, 1st Viscount Frankfort de Montmorency =

Irish politician

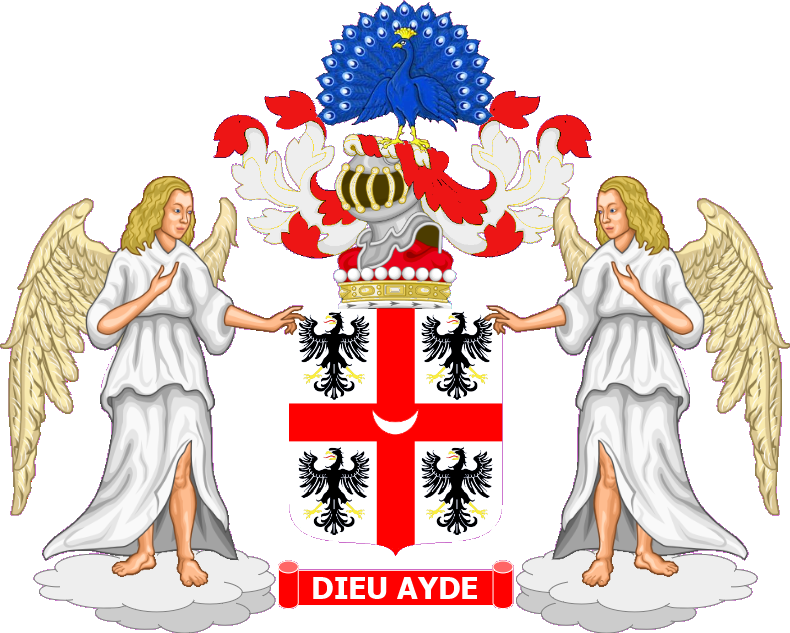
Armorial achievement as a Viscount

Lodge Evans de Montmorency, 1st Viscount Frankfort de Montmorency PC (26 January 1747 – 21 September 1822), known as Lodge Morres until 1800 and as The Lord Frankfort between 1800 and 1816, was an Irish politician.

== Background ==
Born Lodge Morres, he was the son of Redmond Morres and Elizabeth, daughter of Francis Lodge. Hervey Morres, 1st Viscount Mountmorres and Sir William Morres, 1st Baronet, were his uncles.

== Political career ==
Morres was elected a member of the Irish House of Commons for Inistioge in 1768, a seat he held until 1770, and later represented Bandon Bridge between 1776 and 1796, Ennis between 1796 and 1797, and Dingle between 1798 and 1800. He was sworn of the Irish Privy Council in 1796 and served as a Lord of the Treasury between 1796 and 1806.

In 1800 he was raised to the Peerage of Ireland as Baron Frankfort, of Galmoye in the County of Kilkenny. In 1815 he assumed by Royal licence the surname of de Montmorency in lieu of Morres, although the French House of Montmorency did not recognise his claim to be a member of that family. In 1816 he was further honoured when he was made Viscount Frankfort de Montmorency, of Galmoye in the County of Kilkenny, also in the Peerage of Ireland.

== Family ==
Lord Frankfort de Montmorency was twice married. He married Mary, daughter of Joseph Fade, in 1777. After her death in February 1787, he married Catharine, daughter of George White, in 1804. There were children from both marriages. Lord Frankfort de Montmorency died in September 1822, aged 75, and was succeeded in his titles by his son from his second marriage, Lodge. The Viscountess Frankfort de Montmorency died in November 1851.

Coat of arms of Lodge de Montmorency, 1st Viscount Frankfort de Montmorency

Crest
A peacock in its pride Proper.
Escutcheon
Argent a cross Gules between four eagles displayed Sable a crescent for difference.
Supporters
Two angels Proper hair and wings Or vested Argent.
Motto
Dieu Ayde

Parliament of Ireland
Preceded by Joseph Deane; John Hobson	Member of Parliament for Inistioge; 1769–1770; With: Joseph Matthews	Succeeded by Edward Tighe; John Lloyd
Preceded by Francis Bernard; Thomas Adderley	Member of Parliament for Bandon Bridge; 1776–1796; With: William Ponsonby; Francis Bernard; Broderick Chinnery	Succeeded by Broderick Chinnery; William Ponsonby
Preceded by William Conyngham; Sir Edward O'Brien, Bt	Member of Parliament for Ennis; 1796–1797; With: Sir Edward O'Brien, Bt	Succeeded by Sir Edward O'Brien, Bt; Nathaniel Sneyd
Preceded by John Townsend; Bartholomew Hoare	Member of Parliament for Dingle; 1798–1800; With: Sir James Cotter, Bt 1798; William Thomas Monsell 1798–1800; Hon. William Mullins 1800	Constituency abolished
Peerage of Ireland
New creation	Viscount Frankfort de Montmorency; 1816 – 1822	Succeeded by Lodge Reymond de Montmorency
New creation	Baron Frankfort; 1800 – 1822	Succeeded by Lodge Reymond de Montmorency
