= Peter Francis Thorne =

British Army officer and 33rd Serjeant-at-Arms of the House of Commons (1914–2004)

Sir Peter Francis Thorne
- Born: 6 August 1914
- Died: 16 March 2004 (aged 89)
- Alma mater: Trinity College, Oxford
- Spouse: Anne Thorne (m. 1959)
- Relatives: General Sir Andrew Thorne (father)
- Military career
- Allegiance: United Kingdom
- Branch: British Army
- Unit: Grenadier Guards
- Conflicts: Second World War
- Awards: Knight Commander of the Royal Victorian Order; Commander of the Order of the British Empire; Emergency Reserve Decoration

Sir Peter Francis Thorne, KCVO, CBE, ERD (6 August 1914 – 16 March 2004) was a British Army officer.

== Family and education ==
Thorne was the son of General Sir Augustus Francis Andrew Nicol Thorne and the Hon. Margaret Douglas-Pennant (daughter of George Douglas-Pennant, 2nd Baron Penrhyn). His cousin was the courtier Dame Frances Campbell-Preston.

Thorne was educated at Eton College before attending Trinity College, Oxford. Whilst at Oxford, in 1934, he joined the regimental reserve of the Grenadier Guards, his father's regiment.

In 1959 Thorne married the physicist Anne Patricia Pery (daughter of Edmund Colquhoun Pery, 5th Earl of Limerick and Angela Olivia Trotter), with whom he had one son and three daughters.

== Career ==
Thorne crossed to France with the 3rd Battalion of the Grenadier Guards in 1939 to fight in the Second World War. He was wounded at Comines, Nord, during the Allied retreat to Dunkirk. He retired with the rank of lieutenant-colonel in 1946.

Two years later he joined the staff of the House of Commons as Assistant Serjeant at Arms, being promoted to Deputy Serjeant in 1956. In 1976 he went on to serve as the 33rd Serjeant-at-Arms of the House of Commons.

Thorne was a member of the Cavalry and Guards Club and the Royal Yacht Squadron. He died on 16 March 2004, aged 89.

== Publications ==
- The Royal Mace in the House of Commons. Her Majesty's Stationery Office. 1990. ISBN 978-0-10-850628-4.

Government offices
Preceded by Sir Alexander Gordon-Lennox	Serjeant-at-Arms of the House of Commons; 1976–1982	Succeeded by Sir Victor Le Fanu
