= William Pery =

William Pery may refer to:

- William Pery, 3rd Earl of Limerick, Irish peer and politician
- William Pery, 1st Baron Glentworth, Anglican bishop in Ireland
- William Pery, 4th Earl of Limerick, Irish peer and British Army officer
