= Christopher Nugent (disambiguation) =

Christopher Nugent was an Irish writer of the 16th century.

Christopher Nugent may also refer to:

- Christopher Nugent (Irish soldier) (died 1731), Irish Jacobite and soldier in French service
- Christopher Nugent (physician) (1698–1775), Irish Fellow of the Royal Society
- Christopher Nugent (American soldier) (1838–1898), United States Marine Corps soldier and Medal of Honor recipient
- Christopher Nugent, Lord Delvin, Irish lord
