= Christopher Nugent (Irish soldier) =

Irish Jacobite and soldier in French service

Colonel Christopher Nugent (died 4 June 1731) was an Irish Jacobite politician and soldier, who saw extensive service in the French Royal Army of Louis XIV.

== Biography ==
Nugent was the eldest son of Francis Nugent of Dardistown, County Meath, and his wife, Bridget (née Dongan), the daughter of Sir John Dongan, 2nd Baronet. His paternal grandfather was Sir Thomas Nugent, who was created a baronet in 1622, and his maternal uncle was William Dongan, 1st Earl of Limerick.

Nugent was chosen as a Member of Parliament for Fore in the short-lived Patriot Parliament summoned by James II of England in Dublin in 1689. Nugent joined the Jacobite army during the Williamite War in Ireland and in 1691 he was attached to the first troop of Irish horse guards, where he gained the rank of lieutenant colonel of cavalry. At the end of the war, despite assurances that his estates would be protected under the terms of the Treaty of Limerick, Nugent joined in the Flight of the Wild Geese and chose exile in France. He arrived in Brest on 3 December 1691.

In January 1692, Nugent was appointed a second lieutenant in the first troop of guards, the personal bodyguard of James II, serving under James FitzJames, 1st Duke of Berwick. He served with the regiment in Flanders and was wounded four times at the Battle of Landen in 1693. He went on to serve in Germany in 1694 under Guy Aldonce de Durfort, 1st Duke of Quintin and in the army of the Moselle in 1695. On 25 May 1695, Nugent was appointed to the rank of mestre-de-camp de cavalerie.

In 1698, the Irish horse guards were disbanded and Nugent was appointed to Dominic Sheldon's regiment. During the War of the Spanish Succession, he fought in Italy and was present at the Battle of Chiari in 1701 and the Battle of Luzzara in 1702. He was then transferred to Germany and was wounded at the Battle of Speyerbach in 1703, where his command of the Irish cavalry proved a decisive factor in the French victory when he led a charge and routed two regiments of Imperial horse. He returned to Flanders in 1704 and the following year he was promoted to brigadier. In January 1706, Nugent assumed command of Sheldon's regiment; he subsequently led it at the Battle of Ramillies (1706), Battle of Oudenarde (1708) and the Battle of Malplaquet (1709). Nugent was also present at the Battle of Denain (1712) and participated in the Rhine campaign of 1713.

In 1715, without the permission of the French authorities, Nugent accompanied James Francis Edward Stuart to Scotland during the Jacobite rising of 1715, returning to France with the Old Pretender in February 1716. The British ambassador in Paris complained about the presence of a French army officer in the Pretender's retinue, and Nugent was nominally deprived of his French regiment as a reprimand. Nonetheless, on 13 September 1718 Nugent was promoted to major general of horse in the French Royal Army.

Nugent married Bridget, daughter of Robert Barnewall, 9th Baron Trimlestown. He died in France on 4 June 1731.

Parliament of Ireland
New constituency	Fore; 1689; With: John Nugent	Succeeded by John Adams; James Nugent
