= Sir John Dongan, 2nd Baronet =

Irish politician

Sir John Dongan, 2nd Baronet (1603–1650) (Note: His date of death varies, some sources claim 1663.) was a member of the Irish Parliament.

== Early life ==
Dongan was born into an old Gaelic Norman (Irish Catholic) family in Castletown Kildrought (now Celbridge), County Kildare, in the Kingdom of Ireland. He was the son of Jane Rochfort and Walter Dongan (died 1626), who was created 1st Dongan Baronet, of Castletown in the County of Kildare, in the Baronetage of Ireland in 1623.

His maternal grandparents were Robert Rochfort of Kilbryde, County Meath and Elinor Dillon (a daughter of Sir Lucas Dillon, Chief Baron of the Exchequer of Ireland). His paternal grandparents were Margaret (née Forster) Dongan and John Dongan, originally of Fishamble Street, Dublin, a civil servant in the Irish Government who became wealthy and acquired substantial estates in County Kildare.

== Career ==
Upon his father's death in 1626, he became the 2nd Baronet and took up residence at Castletown. He was a member of the Irish Parliament of 1634, under King Charles I of England. In 1643, he was a captain of horse.

== Personal life ==
Dongan was married to Mary Talbot, one of eight sons and eight daughters of Sir William Talbot, 1st Baronet and the former Alison Netterville. Together, they were the parents of at least ten children, including:

- Sir Walter Dongan, 3rd Baronet (c. 1628–1686), a Confederate Catholic who assembled at Kilkenny in 1646 and served under Richard Talbot, 1st Earl of Tyrconnell.
- William Dongan, 1st Earl of Limerick (c. 1630–1698), the 4th Baronet who was made Viscount Dungan, of Clane in the County of Kildare in 1661 and Earl of Limerick in 1686, with remainder, failing male issue of his own, to his brothers Robert, Michael and Thomas and the heirs male of their bodies.
- Thomas Dongan, 2nd Earl of Limerick (1634–1715), the Governor of New York from 1683 to 1688.
- Bridget Dongan (born c. 1635), who married Francis Nugent, a son of Sir Thomas Nugent, 1st Baronet, and was the mother of Christopher Nugent.
- Alice Dongan (born c. 1635), who married Robert Nugent, son of Walter Nugent.
- Margaret Dongan (died 1678), who married Robert Barnewell, 9th Baron Trimlestown.

Sir John died in 1650 but his will was not proved until 1663.

=== Descendants ===
Through his daughter Margaret, he was the grandfather of Mary Barnewell, who married her cousin, Michael Nugent, and were the parents of Robert Nugent, 1st Earl Nugent.

Baronetage of Ireland
Preceded by Walter Dongan	Baronet (of Castletown); 1626–1650	Succeeded by Walter Dongan
