= Angela Pery =

British leader of the Red Cross

The Right Honourable The Countess of Limerick
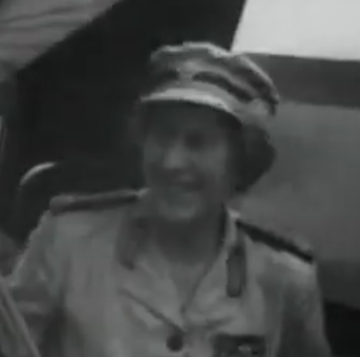
- In Malaya in 1953 representing the Red Cross
- Born: Angela Olivia Trotter; 27 August 1897; Folkestone
- Died: 25 April 1981 (aged 83); West Hoathly
- Known for: leadership of the Red Cross
- Spouse: Edmund Pery, 5th Earl of Limerick (m. 1926; died 1967)
- Children: 3, including Anne and Patrick, 6th Earl of Limerick
- Father: Sir Henry Trotter

Angela Olivia Pery, Countess of Limerick, CH GBE DStJ (née Trotter; 27 August 1897 – 25 April 1981) was a leader of the International British Red Cross movements.

== Life ==
Angela Pery, Dowager Countess of Limerick, was born in Folkestone on 27 August 1897 and died on 25 April 1981. She was the last child of Lt Col. Sir Henry Trotter KCMG, who was an Indian Army officer, an explorer, and a diplomat, and his wife, Olivia Georgiana, daughter of Admiral Sir George Wellesley. Pery was a great-great-niece of the Duke of Wellington. Her family spent some time in Romania. She had a scar on her arm which was said to have been made by King Carol when they played together.

Pery went to North Foreland Lodge at Broadstairs until she was 17 when she left to train as a nurse. She became a Red Cross Voluntary Aid Detachment nurse. She nursed the wounded of World War One in French and British hospitals after she lied about her age to get accepted.

At the end of the war she continued her education at the London School of Economics where she studied social science and administration. She then travelled both in Europe and adventurously in the Middle East.

In 1926 Angela Trotter married Edmund Colquhoun Pery, but she continued to work in the London branch of the British Red Cross Society. She became Countess of Limerick on her husband's succession as Earl of Limerick in 1929. She served as a Poor Law Guardian from 1928 to 1930 and on Kensington Borough Council until 1935 when the following year she was elected the representative of Kensington South on the London county council. She continued the role throughout the war. Her support for contraception led to her being called the "Countess of Contraception" and missiles were thrown at her during a meeting in Glasgow.

At the outbreak of the Second World War, the Red Cross joined with the St John Ambulance to re-establish the Joint War Organisation they had first established in the First World War. Pery had continued her association with the Red Cross and served as their deputy director. She visited battle fronts and over a dozen countries becoming a Commander of the Order of the British Empire on 1 January 1942 and an Officer of The Most Venerable Order of the Hospital of St. John of Jerusalem on 19 June 1942.

On 1 January 1946, Angela, Countess of Limerick was elevated from Commander to Dame Commander of the Order of the British Empire (DBE). In 1947 she was promoted from director to President of the British Red Cross Society in London.

In January 1953 she was appointed a Dame of The Most Venerable Order of the Hospital of St. John of Jerusalem and in the same year, Pathe News reported on her visit to the Red Cross in Malaya. In 1954, she was elevated to Dame Grand Cross of the Order of the British Empire (GBE). In 1974 she was appointed to the Order of the Companions of Honour.

After the war and until 1963, Pery ran the international part of the British Red Cross' operation. She visited 26 other Red Cross societies and this base assisted her in becoming vice chair of the League of Red Cross Societies from 1957 to 1973. In 1965 she became chair of the International Red Cross which she served for two four-year terms. She stood down in 1976.

Meanwhile, in 1974 she became Chairman of the Council of the British Red Cross Society, succeeding the Duke of Edinburgh. She was subsequently made a vice-president of the Society on her retirement in 1976, becoming non-royal to serve in that capacity; her appointment was cleared with Queen Elizabeth.

Her GBE in 1954 & her CH in 1974 were matched by her husband Lord Limerick's GBE in 1954 & his CH in 1960. They are the only married couple in British history both awarded these two top honours, and even to both hold the GBE. Also - until Lady Antonia Fraser's 2017 CH matched her Nobel Literature Laureate husband Harold Pinter's 2008 CH - the only married couple both awarded the CH.

Angela, Countess of Limerick, died in 1981.

== Family ==
Pery had three children:

- Lady Anne Patricia Pery was born in 1928. She would later marry the physics lecturer Sir Peter Francis Thorne.
- Patrick Edmund, Viscount Glentworth was born in 1930.
- Hon. Michael Henry Colquhoun Pery was born in 1937.

The 5th Earl of Limerick Lord Limerick died by his own hand in 1967, having braved excruciating & then incurable arthritis for many years. His titles were inherited by his elder son, Patrick, who died in 2003.
