= Giles Masters =

2nd Attorney General of the Dominion of New England
- In office April 1687 – August 1687
- Appointed by: Edmund Andros
- Preceded by: Benjamin Bullivant
- Succeeded by: James Graham

2nd Clerk of the Superior Court of the Dominion of New England
- In office April 1687 – August 1687
- Preceded by: Benjamin Bullivant
- Succeeded by: James Graham

Personal details
- Died: February 29, 1688

Coat of Arms of Giles Masters

Giles Masters was appointed as the second Attorney General of the Dominion of New England on the 30 of August, 1687 and the first under the reign of Sir Edmund Andros. His service as Attorney General expired no earlier than August 25, 1687.

Masters was sworn in as an attorney in 1686. He was described as “not sympathetic toward our people”, and he was known as "King's Attorney". He reportedly had a relative named "Katherine Masters".

Giles Masters died on February 29, 1688.

Legal offices
Preceded by Benjamin Bullivant	Attorney General of the Dominion of New England; April 1687–August 1687	Succeeded by James Graham
Preceded by Benjamin Bullivant	Clerk of the Superior Court of the Dominion of New England; April 1687–August 1687	Succeeded by James Graham
