= Henry Trotter (Indian Army officer) =

British Indian Army officer and author

Sir Henry Trotter
- Born: 30 August 1841
- Died: 25 September 1919 (aged 78); Chobham, Surrey
- Military career
- Allegiance: United Kingdom
- Branch: British Indian Army
- Rank: Lieutenant Colonel
- Awards: Knight Commander of the Order of St Michael and St George; Companion of the Order of the Bath

Lieutenant Colonel Sir Henry Trotter, KCMG, CB (30 August 1841 – 25 September 1919) was a British Indian Army officer in the Royal Engineers, an author, and an explorer of Central Asia.

== Biography ==
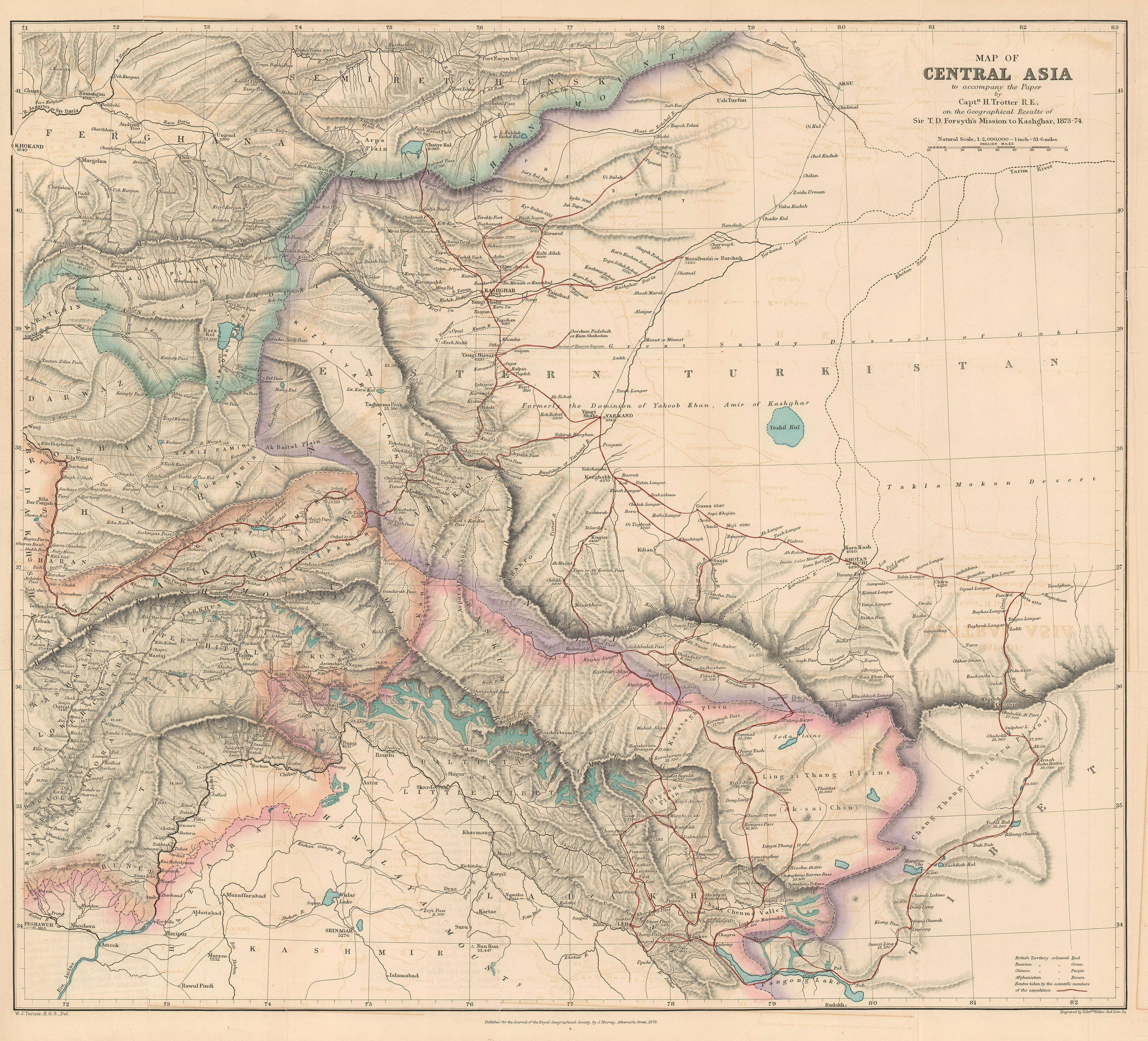
The map of the Second Yarkand Mission, accompanying Trotter's report to the Royal Geographical Society.

Trotter attended Addiscombe Military Seminary from 1858 to 1860, and was awarded his commission in the Royal Engineers, Bengal on 8 June 1860. He sailed to India in 1862, and from 1863 to 1875 served on the Great Trigonometric Survey. He was a member of the Second Yarkand Mission to Xinjiang to visit the territory ruled by Yakub Beg: the mission had 350 support staff and 6,476 porters, and was led by Sir Thomas Douglas Forsyth. Among the other Indian Army officers were Thomas E. Gordon, John Biddulph, Henry Bellew, Ferdinand Stoliczka and R. A. Champman. During the exhibition Trotter was the first recorded European to have shot an Ovis Poli. Trotter, now a captain, joined the special service in China in 1876 and he served as assistant military attaché at Constantinople during the Russo-Turkish War of 1877–78; Trotter was present at the fall of Erzurum to the Russians. In 1879, now a major, he was appointed consul for Kurdistan; and in 1880 he was appointed consul at Erzurum. From 1882 to 1889 he served as military attaché at Constantinople, following which he became British consul-general in Syria, based in Beirut.

In 1906, Trotter retired from public service and in 1907, he began to work with the Central Asian Society. He served as a member of the council for the society and from 1917 to 1918 he was president of the society. Trotter was invested as a Knight Commander of the Order of St Michael and St George (KCMG) and a Companion of the Order of the Bath (CB).

Trotter died on 25 September 1919 at Lucas Green Manor, Chobham, Surrey.

== Family ==
Henry Trotter was the fourth son of Alexander Trotter (1804–1865), a wealthy stockbroker for Coutts Bank and his first wife Jacqueline Elizabeth Otter (1811–1849), a daughter of William Otter, Bishop of Chichester.

On 15 October 1890 Trotter married Olivia Georgiana Wellesley, daughter of Admiral George Wellesley and Elizabeth Lukin. He and his wife had two daughters, Jacqueline Theodora (1894–1948) and Angela Olivia in 1897.

His wife and daughters survived him. In 1926 Trotter's daughter Angela married Edmond Pery, 5th Earl of Limerick. Her son, Trotter's grandson, was Patrick Pery, 6th Earl of Limerick.

== List of publications ==
- 1875. Trotter, Henry. Account of the Survey Operations in Connection with the Mission to Yarkand and Kashgar in 1873–74. Calcutta: Printed at the Foreign Department Press.
- 1876. Secret and Confidential Report of the Trans-Himalayan Explorations by Employees of the Great Trigonometrical Survey of India, during 1873-74-75. Calcutta.
- 1878. "On the Geographic Results of the Mission to Kashgar under Sir T. Douglas Forsyth in 1873–74." Journal of the Royal Geographical Society 48. pp. 173–234.
- 1907. “Despatch by Lieutenant-Colonel Sir Henry Trotter Reporting Upon the Operations of the European Commission of the Danube During the Years 1894–1906, Together with a Résumé of Its Previous History.” H.M. Stationery Office.
- 1917. "The Amir Yakoub Khan and Eastern Turkestan in Mid-Nineteenth Century." Journal of the Royal Central Asian Society. Vol. 4. No. 4. pp. 95–112.
