= Thomas Douglas Forsyth =

Anglo-Indian administrator and diplomat

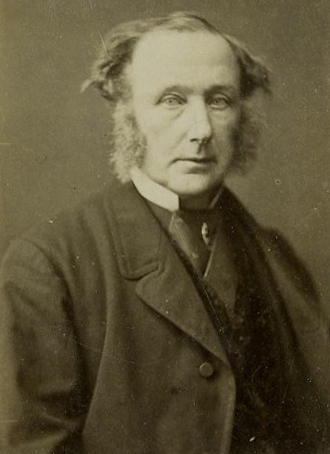
- Photo of Forsyth, circa 1870
- Born: 7 October 1827; Birkenhead, England, United Kingdom
- Died: 17 December 1886 (aged 59); Eastbourne, England , United Kingdom
- Occupation: Diplomat

Sir Thomas Douglas Forsyth KCSI CB FRGS (7 October 1827 – 17 December 1886) was an Anglo-Indian administrator and diplomat.

== Early life ==
Forsyth was born in Birkenhead on 7 October 1827. He was the tenth child of Thomas Forsyth, a Liverpool merchant. His brother was the barrister William Forsyth. He was educated at Sherborne, Rugby and under private tuition, until he entered the East India Company's College at Haileybury, where he remained until December 1847.

== In the subcontinent ==
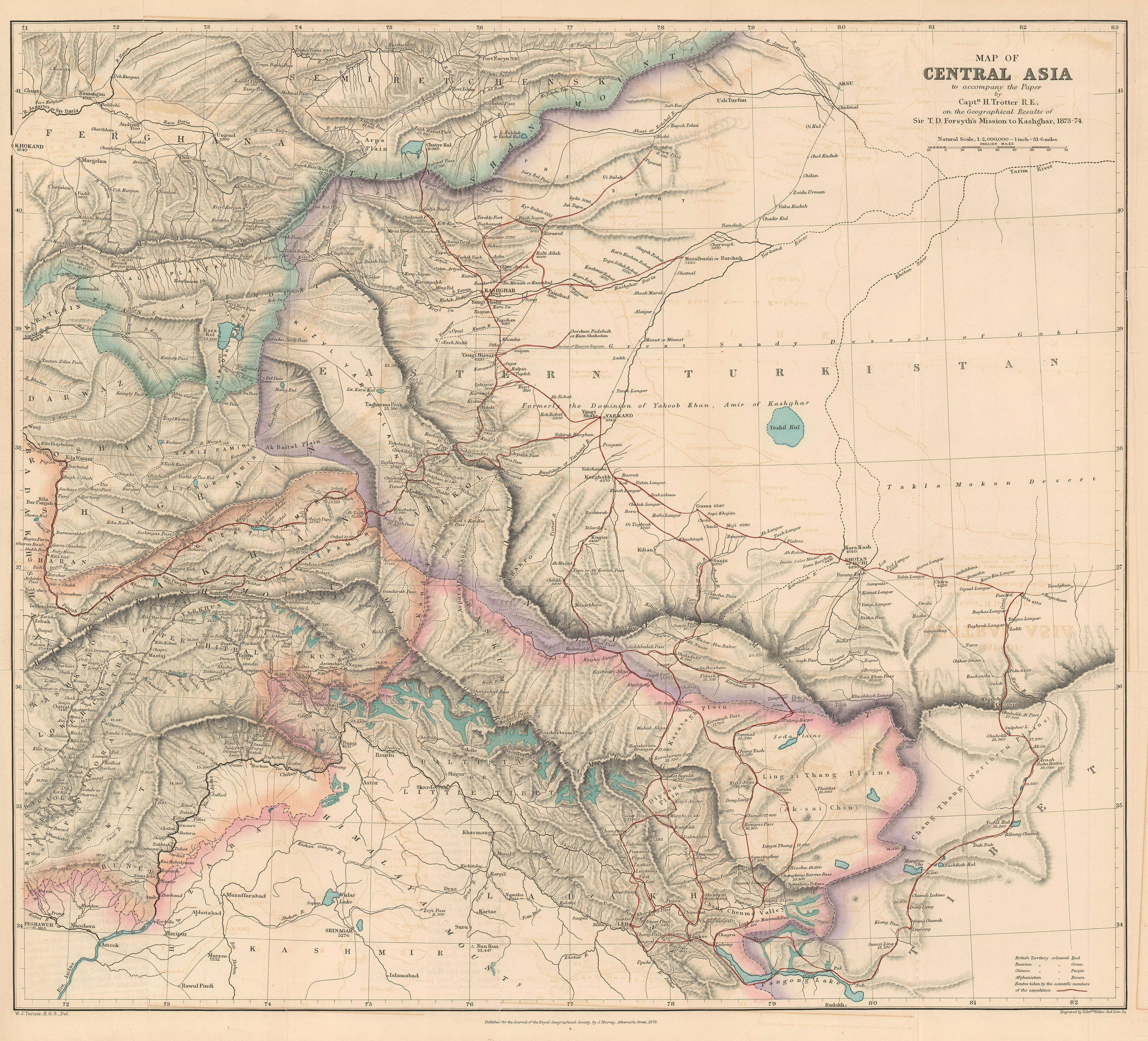
The map of Forsyth's Kashgar expedition, compiled for Capt. Trotter's report to the Royal Geographical Society

He embarked for India in January 1848 and arrived at Calcutta in the following March. Here he gained honours in Persian, Hindustani, and Hindi at the company's college, and in September of the same year was appointed to a post under Edward Thornton at Saharanpur. On the annexation of the Punjab after the Second Anglo-Sikh War in March 1849, he was appointed to take part in the administration of the new province, and was sent by Sir Henry Lawrence, together with Colonel Marsden, as deputy-commissioner over him, to Pakpattan. He was shortly afterwards appointed by Lord Dalhousie to the post of assistant-commissioner at Simla. While holding this post he married in 1850 Alice Mary, daughter of Thomas Plumer of Canons Park, Edgware.

He was next stationed at Kangra, where he remained until 1854 when an attack of brain fever obliged him to return for a time to England. On going back to India he spent a short time as deputy-commissioner, first at Gurdaspur and subsequently at Rawalpindi, whence he was transferred in 1855 to Umballa. He was here at the outbreak of the Indian Rebellion of 1857, detected the first signs of disaffection, and reported them. After the capture of Delhi he was one of the special commissioners appointed to hunt up the rebels, and in this capacity was principally engaged in examining the papers of the Nana of Cawnpore. He arrived at Lucknow in time to see the city evacuated by the rebels, and after this event acted as secretary successively to Sir James Outram, Sir Robert Montgomery, and Charles John Wingfield, until, in 1860, he was appointed commissioner to the Punjab. For his services during the rebellion, he received the Order of Companion of the Bath.

In 1867 he visited Leh, the capital of Ladakh, with the object of obtaining from the Kashmir officials a removal of restrictions on trade between Xinjiang and the Punjab. On his return, he instituted an annual fair at Palampur, in the Kangra valley, to which he invited traders from Xinjiang. The experiences which he gained in this way encouraged him in the idea of improving relations between the Indian government, Central Asia and the Russians. Lord Mayo approved and authorised him to proceed to England, and if possible to St. Petersburg, with the object of arranging with the Russian government a definition of the territories of the Amir of Kabul. In this mission, he succeeded in proving that the disputed districts belonged to the Amir, and obtained from the Russian government an acknowledgement to that effect.

Forsyth returned to India in 1869. At this time Yakub Beg, as the separatist anti-Chinese leader of Yarkand and Kashgar, in order to establish relations between the territories occupied by his army and India, had sent an envoy to the viceroy with the request that a British officer might be deputed to visit him. Forsyth was instructed to return with the envoy, without political capacity, for the purpose of acquiring information about the people and country. The journey from Lahore to Yarkand and back, a distance of two thousand miles, was accomplished in six months; but the expedition failed to produce all the results expected from it, because of the absence of the amir from his capital on its arrival. Of the part of the journey over the high table land (16,000 feet (4,900 m) above sea level) connecting the Karakoram and Kuen Luen ranges, Forsyth wrote that the influence on him was so great:

"a good breath, even when the body was in a state of rest, was a luxury seldom enjoyed ... and a feeling of exhaustion and severe nausea were continuous."

In 1872 resistance by the Namdhari (Kuka) sect of Ram Singh occurred at Malerkotla. Troops were at once ordered to the disaffected districts, and Forsyth was entrusted with the duty of suppressing the insurrection. His powers on this occasion seem not to have been sufficiently defined, and Lambert Cowan, the then commissioner of Ludhiana, had anticipated his arrival by executing many of the rebels, a course of action which, though contrary to instructions, Forsyth felt bound to support. When the insurrection was put down, an inquiry instituted into the conduct of Forsyth and Cowan resulted in the removal of both from their appointments. Forsyth appealed against this decision to Lord Northbrook who had recently come out as viceroy; he was compensated by being appointed in 1873 envoy on a mission to Kashgar. The object of this mission was to conclude a commercial treaty with the Amir, and it resulted in the removal of hindrances to trade between the two countries. Among the Indian Army officers who accompanied Forsyth were Thomas E. Gordon, John Biddulph, Henry Bellew, Ferdinand Stoliczka, Henry Trotter and R. A. Champman. On his return, Forsyth received the order of Knight Commander of the Star of India.

In 1875 Forsyth was sent as envoy to the King of Burma to obtain a settlement of the question which had arisen between the British and Burmese governments as to the relation of the Karenni States, a question which was settled by an agreement, proposed by the king of Burma, that these states should be acknowledged as independent.

== Later life ==
Forsyth left India on furlough in 1876. In the following year, he resigned and occupied himself during the remaining years of his life in the direction of Indian railway companies. In 1879 he formed a company for the purpose of connecting Marmagao, in Portuguese India, with the Southern Mahratta and Deccan countries; and in 1883 he was deputed by the board of directors to visit India and report upon the progress of the works.

In 1881 Forsyth became the first chairperson of the Indian Tea Association started in London. He died on 17 December 1886 at Eastbourne.

== Legacy ==
Forsyth is commemorated in the scientific name of a species of Chinese lizard, Phrynocephalus forsythii.

== Works ==
- Yarkand (Forsyth's mission) (1871)
- Sir Thomas Douglas Forsyth (1875). Report of a mission to Yarkund in 1873, under command of Sir T. D. Forsyth: with historical and geographical information regarding the possessions of the ameer of Yarkund. Printed at the Foreign department press. p. 573.
- Report of a Mission to Yarkund in 1873, Under Command of Sir T. D. Forsyth ... (1875)
- Report of a Mission to Yarkund in 1873 : vol.1
- Autobiography and Reminiscences of Sir Douglas Forsyth, C.B., K.C.S.I., F.R.G.S. Edited by his daughter. Publisher: R. Bentley and Son, London, 1887

== Sources ==
- Forsyth, Sir Thomas Douglas (1887). Autobiography and Reminiscences of Sir Douglas Forsyth, C.B., K.C.S.I., F.R.G.S. London: Richard Bentley and Son.
- This article incorporates text from a publication now in the public domain: "Forsyth, Thomas Douglas". Dictionary of National Biography. London: Smith, Elder & Co. 1885–1900.
- Forsyth, W. (1887). "Obituary: Sir T. Douglas Forsyth, K. C. S. I., C. B.". Proceedings of the Royal Geographical Society. 9 (2): 123–126. ISSN 0266-626X. JSTOR 1800809.
- Behal, Rana P. (2014). One Hundred Years of Solitude: Political Economy of Tea Plantations in Colonial Assam. New Delhi: Tulika Books.
