= Edmund Elliot =

Major Sir Edmund Halbert Elliot MVO (7 November 1854 – 20 September 1926) was a British Army officer and courtier.

Born at Wilton Lodge near Hawick, Elliot was the son of Lt.-Col. Edmund James Elliot and Matilda Inglis. He was the grandson of MP Hon. John Elliot and great-grandson of Gilbert Elliot-Murray-Kynynmound, 1st Earl of Minto. He was educated at Cheltenham College before attending the Royal Military Academy, Woolwich, from where he commissioned into the Royal Artillery. Elliot served with distinction in the Anglo-Zulu War, being mentioned in dispatches.

In 1892, Elliot became an exon in the Yeomen of the Guard and was promoted to the rank of Clerk of the Cheque and Adjutant in 1901. In 1907, Elliot was honoured as a Member of the Royal Victorian Order. He became ensign of the Yeoman of the Guard in 1908. In 1911, he was invested as a Knight bachelor by George V in recognition of his service in the royal bodyguard.

Elliot married Isabella, daughter of James Charles Henry Colquhoun and widow of William Pery, 3rd Earl of Limerick, on 22 February 1898.
