= Walter Dungan, Viscount Dungan =

Irish Jacobite soldier and politician

Walter Dungan, Viscount Dungan (c.1650 – 1 July 1690) was an Irish Jacobite soldier and politician.

== Biography ==
Dungan was the only son of William Dongan, 1st Earl of Limerick and Euphemia Maria, daughter of Sir Richard Chamber. He was born in Jerez de la Frontera, Spain, but was naturalised by the Parliament of Ireland in 1654.

His father ensured the family's support for James II of England following the Glorious Revolution. In 1689, Dungan was the Member of Parliament for Naas in the brief Patriot Parliament called by James in Dublin. He was granted a commission in James' army during the Williamite War in Ireland, becoming colonel of Lord Dongan's Dragoons. During the Siege of Derry, he was dispatched to Derry to bring news to the Jacobite commander Richard Hamilton that a Williamite flotilla under Percy Kirke had been sent to relieve the city. He was killed on 1 July 1690 while leading a detachment of Jacobite horse at the Battle of the Boyne.

As a result of Dungan's death, his father's earldom was inherited by special remainder by the first earl's brother, Thomas Dongan, in 1698. Dungan was described by Henry Hyde, 2nd Earl of Clarendon as a "prattling, impertinent, and forward youth".

Parliament of Ireland
| Preceded by George Carr; Sir John Hoey | Member of Parliament for Naas; 1689; With: Charles White | Succeeded by John Aylmer; Nicholas Jones |
