= International Financial Services London =

International Financial Services, London
- Abbreviation: IFSL
- Successor: TheCityUK
- Formation: 1968
- Dissolved: 1 June 2010
- Legal status: Not for profit company
- Purpose: Employer organisation for financial services in London and its international trade
- Location(s): Cornhill; London, EC3; United Kingdom
- Region served: United Kingdom
- Members: 150 financial services companies
- Chief Executive Officer: Sir Stephen Wright KCMG
- Affiliations: FCO, UKTI, BIS, City of London Corporation
- Website: IFSL

International Financial Services, London, usually shortened to just IFSL, was a private-sector organisation which promoted British financial services. It was merged into a new promotional organisation, TheCityUK, in 2010. It was formerly known as British Invisibles.

== History ==
British Invisibles itself originated in the Committee on Invisible Exports, set up in April 1968 by the Bank of England and then became the British Invisible Exports Council. It was largely the idea of Cyril Kleinwort who realised that the government was paying much attention to the UK's balance of trade in goods, but little to the UK's invisible earnings from services. In 1984 Patrick Pery, 6th Earl of Limerick had become Chairman of the organisation by which time invisible earnings were accounting for a third of the UK's earnings. He stayed until 1991. On 19 October 1990 the organisation (registered as a company) became British Invisibles. In January 1998 it merged with CEENET, a company set up by the Corporation of London to promote financial services to Eastern Europe, and re-branded itself as BI. It acquired a new Chief Executive, Jeremy Seddon, and a new Deputy Chief Executive, Henrietta Royle. Charlie Haswell joined the executive team, and later the Board, on secondment from the Foreign and Commonwealth Office to develop links with British Embassies and High Commissions around the world. The company was a membership organisation and focused on running promotional events abroad for its members (primarily in the emerging markets), undertaking research on the performance of the financial services industry and providing the secretariat for financial services lobbying in the WTO. BI became known as IFSL on 1 February 2001. Invisibles historically have consisted of services (financial and legal), investment income and transfers. The organisation has in the past published The City Table, giving the order of financial services companies.

With effect from 1 June 2010 IFSL, the independent organisation representing the UK financial services industry internationally, has merged its activities, staff and business membership into TheCityUK, the new promotional body for the UK-based industry. TheCityUK is continuing IFSL's work of promoting the industry around the world, influencing trade policy and regulation, and publishing definitive research on the sector.

== Membership ==
IFSL had a membership drawn from across the spectrum of the UK's financial and related business services, including trade and professional associations, exchanges, the Bank of England, the City of London Corporation and leading international financial service companies that based in London. IFSL also worked closely with Government departments, including UK Trade & Investment, the Department for Business, Innovation and Skills, HM Treasury, and the Office for National Statistics.

== Aims ==
IFSL promoted the international activities of UK-based financial institutions, through business events in the UK and worldwide. Through its Liberalisation of Trade In Services (LOTIS) Committee, IFSL brought together government and the industry in working for the removal of barriers to trade in financial services. It also promoted public-private partnerships (PPPs), which involve large quantities of private finance.

== Structure ==
Its last chairman was Lord Levene of Portsoken, and its last president was the Duke of Kent.
