= Dominion of New England =

English regional government in America, 1686–1689

- 1686–1689
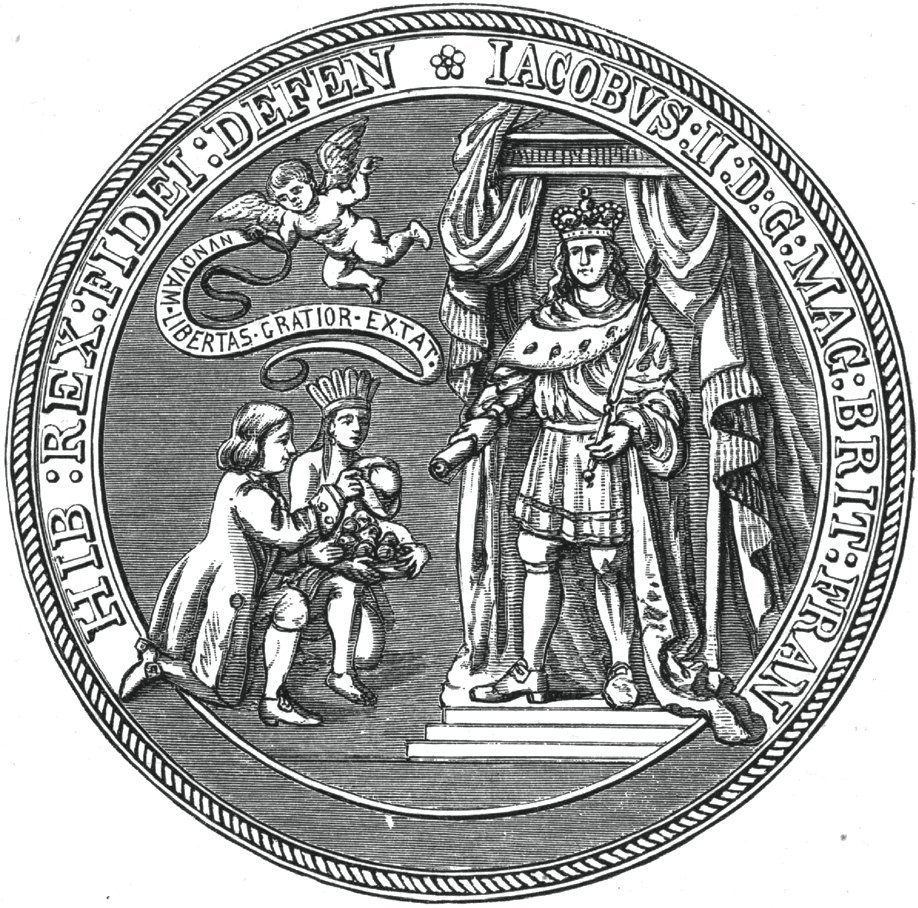
- Flag Seal
- Motto: Nunquam libertas gratior extat (Latin); Nowhere does liberty appear in a greater form (English)
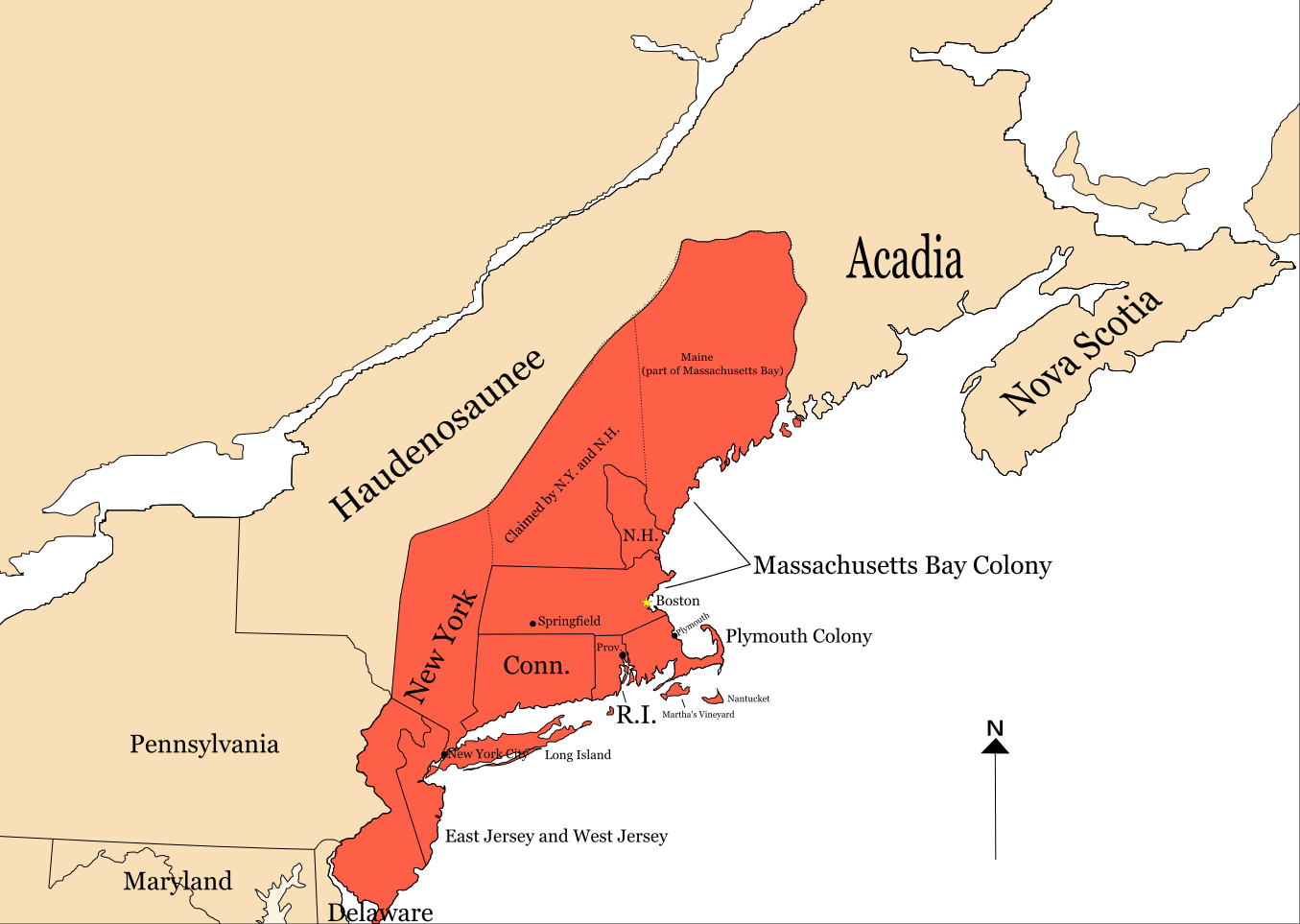
- Map of the Dominion, represented in dark red, as of 1688. Names of the constituent and neighboring colonies also shown.
- Status: Crown colony of England
- Capital: Boston
- Official languages: English
- Minority languages: Dutch; French; Iroquoian; Algonquian
- Monarch
  - 1686–1688: James II
  - 1688–1689: William III & Mary II
- Royal Governor
  - 1686: Joseph Dudley
  - 1686–1689: Edmund Andros
- Lieutenant Governor
  - 1688–1689: Francis Nicholson
- Legislature: Council of New England
- Historical era: British colonization of the Americas; Glorious Revolution; Colonial history of the United States
  - Joseph Dudley is made governor of New England: 25 May 1686
  - Boston revolt: 18 April 1689
- Currency: Pound sterling
Preceded by
New England Colonies
Province of New York
Province of East Jersey
Province of West Jersey
Succeeded by
New England Colonies
Province of New York
Province of East Jersey
Province of West Jersey
- Today part of: United States

The Dominion of New England in America (1686–1689) was a short-lived administrative union of English colonies covering all of New England and the Mid-Atlantic Colonies, with the exception of the Delaware Colony and the Province of Pennsylvania. The region's political structure was one of centralized control similar to the model used by the Spanish monarchy under the Viceroyalty of New Spain. The dominion was unacceptable to most colonists because they deeply resented being stripped of their rights and having their colonial charters revoked. Governor Edmund Andros tried to make legal and structural changes, but most of these were undone and the Dominion was overthrown as soon as word was received that King James II had vacated the throne in England. One notable change was the forced introduction of the Church of England into Massachusetts, whose Puritan leaders had previously refused to allow it any foothold.

The Dominion encompassed a very large area from the Delaware River in the south to Penobscot Bay in the north, composed of the Province of New Hampshire, Province of Maine, Massachusetts Bay Colony, Plymouth Colony, Colony of Rhode Island and Providence Plantations, King's Province, Connecticut Colony, Province of New York, and the provinces of East Jersey and West Jersey. It was too large for a single governor to manage. Governor Andros was highly unpopular and was seen as a threat by most political factions. News of the Glorious Revolution in England reached Boston in 1689, and the Puritans launched the 1689 Boston revolt against Andros, arresting him and his officers.

Leisler's Rebellion in New York deposed the dominion's lieutenant governor Francis Nicholson. After these events, the colonies that had been assembled into the dominion reverted to their previous forms of government, although some governed informally without a charter. King William III of England and Queen Mary II eventually issued new charters.

== Background ==
A number of English colonies were established in America and in the West Indies during the first half of the 17th century, with varying attributes. Some originated as commercial ventures, such as the Virginia Colony, while others were founded for religious reasons, such as Plymouth Colony, Massachusetts Bay Colony and Rhode Island Colony. The governments of the colonies also varied. Virginia became a crown colony, despite its corporate beginning, while Massachusetts and other New England colonies had corporate charters and a great deal of administrative freedom. Other areas were proprietary colonies, such as Pennsylvania, Maryland, and Carolina, owned and under the jurisdiction of one or a few individuals.

Following the English Restoration in 1660, King Charles II sought to centralize the administration of these separate colonial entities. Charles and his government began a process that brought a number of the colonies under direct crown control. One reason for these actions was the cost of administration of individual colonies, but another significant reason was the regulation of trade. Throughout the 1660s, the English Parliament passed a number of laws to regulate the trade of the colonies, collectively called the Navigation Acts. The American colonists resisted these laws, particularly in the New England colonies which had established significant trading networks with other English colonies and with European countries and their colonies, especially Spain and the Dutch Republic. The Navigation Acts also outlawed some long-standing New England practices, in effect turning merchants into smugglers while significantly increasing the cost of doing business.

Some of the New England colonies presented specific problems for the king, and combining those colonies into a single administrative entity was seen as a way to resolve those problems. Plymouth Colony had never been formally chartered, and the New Haven Colony had sheltered two of the regicides of Charles I, the king's father. The territory of Maine was disputed by competing grantees and by Massachusetts, and New Hampshire was a very small, recently established crown colony whose own elites opposed its existence. In 1683, Gove's Rebellion was in opposition to direct royal rule in New Hampshire. The Massachusetts General Court authorized Boston silversmith John Hull to produce local coinage between 1652 and 1682, which the English government considered treasonous.

Massachusetts had a long history of virtually theocratic rule, and they exhibited little tolerance for non-Puritans, including supporters of the Church of England (which was most important for the king). Charles II repeatedly sought to change the Massachusetts government, but they resisted all substantive attempts at reform. In 1683, legal proceedings were begun to vacate the Massachusetts charter; it was formally annulled in June 1684.

England's desire for colonies that produced agricultural staples worked well for the southern colonies, which produced tobacco, rice, and indigo, but not so well for New England due to the geology of the region. Lacking a suitable staple, the New Englanders engaged in trade and became successful competitors to English merchants. They were now starting to develop workshops that threatened to deprive England of its lucrative colonial market for manufactured articles, such as textiles, leather goods, and ironware. The plan, therefore, was to establish a uniform all-powerful government over the northern colonies so that the people would be diverted away from manufacturing and foreign trade.

== Establishment ==
Following the revocation of the Massachusetts charter, Charles II and the Lords of Trade moved forward with plans to establish a unified administration over at least some of the New England colonies. The specific objectives of the dominion included the regulation of trade, reformation of land title practices to conform more to English methods and practices, coordination on matters of defense, and a streamlining of the administration into fewer centers. The Dominion initially comprised the territories of the Massachusetts Bay Colony, the Plymouth Colony, the Province of New Hampshire, the Province of Maine, and the Narraganset Country (Washington County, Rhode Island).

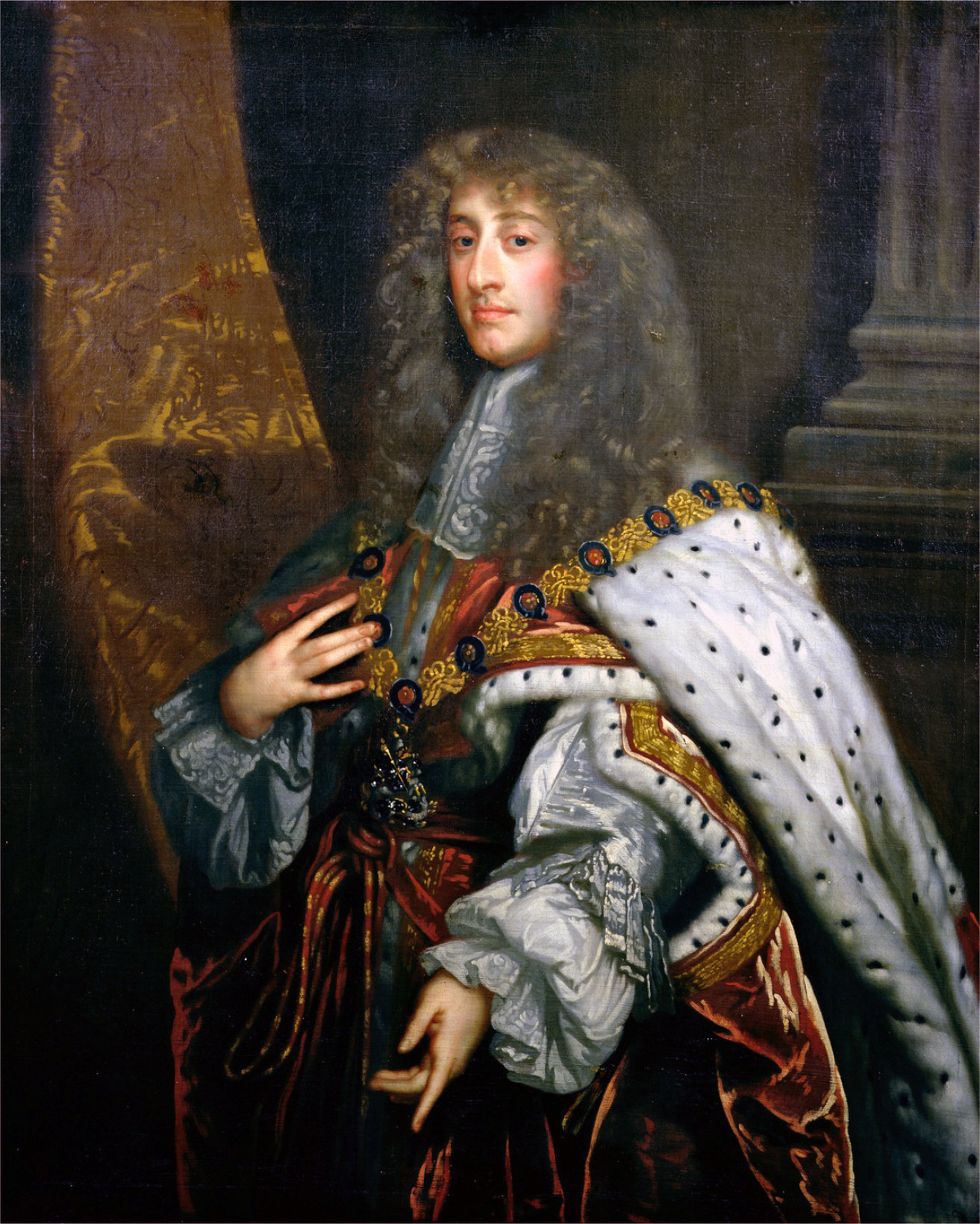
King James II

Charles II had chosen Colonel Percy Kirke to govern the dominion, but Charles died in February 1685 before the commission was approved. King James II approved Kirke's commission later in 1685, but Kirke came under harsh criticism for his role in putting down Monmouth's Rebellion, and his commission was withdrawn. The King issued a provisional commission on October 8, 1685 to Massachusetts Bay native Joseph Dudley as President of the Council of New England, due to delays in developing the commission for Kirke's intended successor Sir Edmund Andros.

Dudley's limited commission specified that he would rule with an appointed council and no representative legislature. The councilors named as members of this body included a cross-section of politically moderate men from the old colonial governments. Edward Randolph had served as the crown agent investigating affairs in New England, and he was appointed to the council, as well. Randolph was also commissioned with a long list of other posts, including secretary of the dominion, collector of customs, and deputy postmaster.

== Dudley administration ==
Dudley's charter arrived in Boston on May 14, 1686, and he formally took charge of Massachusetts on May 25. His rule did not begin auspiciously, since a number of Massachusetts magistrates refused to serve on his council. Simon Bradstreet, William Stoughton, Peter Bulkley, John Pynchon, Robert Tufton Mason, Richard Wharton, Wait Winthrop, Nathaniel Saltonstall, Bartholomew Gedney, Jonathan Tyng, John Usher, Dudley Bradstreet, John Hincks, Francis Champenoone, Edward Tyng, Fitz-John Winthrop, and Edward Randolph were all named in the commission, but Bradstreet and Wait Winthrop refused.

According to Edward Randolph, the Puritan magistrates "were of opinion that God would never suffer me to land again in this country, and thereupon began in a most arbitrary manner to assert their power higher than at any time before." Elections of colonial military officers were also compromised when many of them refused to serve. Dudley made a number of judicial appointments, generally favoring the political moderates who had supported accommodation of the king's wishes in the battle over the old charter.

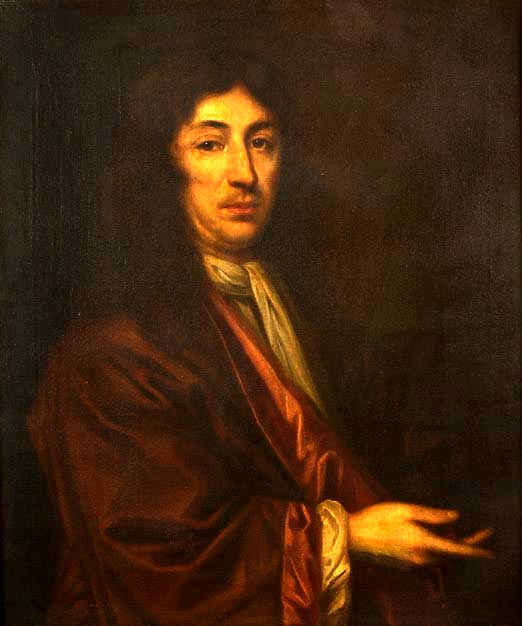
Joseph Dudley

Dudley was significantly hampered by the inability to raise revenues in the dominion. His commission did not allow the introduction of new revenue laws, and the Massachusetts government had repealed all such laws in 1683, anticipating the loss of the charter. Furthermore, many refused to pay the few remaining taxes on the grounds that they had been enacted by the old government and were thus invalid. Dudley and Randolph were largely unsuccessful at introducing the Church of England due to a lack of funding, but they were also hampered by the perceived political danger of imposing on the existing churches for their use.

Dudley and Randolph enforced the Navigation Acts, although they did not adhere entirely to the laws. Some variations were overlooked, understanding that certain provisions of the acts were unfair, and they suggested to the Lords of Trade that the laws be modified to ameliorate these conditions. However, the Massachusetts economy suffered, also negatively affected by external circumstances. A dispute eventually occurred between Dudley and Randolph over matters related to trade.

The Lords of Trade decided on September 9, 1686 to include the colonies of Rhode Island and Connecticut in the dominion, based on a petition from Dudley's council. Andros's commission had been issued in June, and he was given an annex to his commission to incorporate them into the dominion.

== Andros administration ==
Andros had previously been governor of New York; he arrived in Boston on December 20, 1686 and immediately assumed power. He took a hard-line position, claiming that the colonists had left behind all their rights as Englishmen when they left England. The Reverend John Wise rallied his parishioners in 1687 to protest and resist taxes, so Andros had him arrested, convicted, and fined. An Andros official stated: "Mr. Wise, you have no more privileges Left you then not to be Sold for Slaves."

Andros' commission called for governance by himself with a council. The initial composition of the council included representatives from each of the colonies which the dominion absorbed, but the council's quorums were dominated by representatives from Massachusetts and Plymouth because of the inconvenience of travel and the fact that travel costs were not reimbursed.

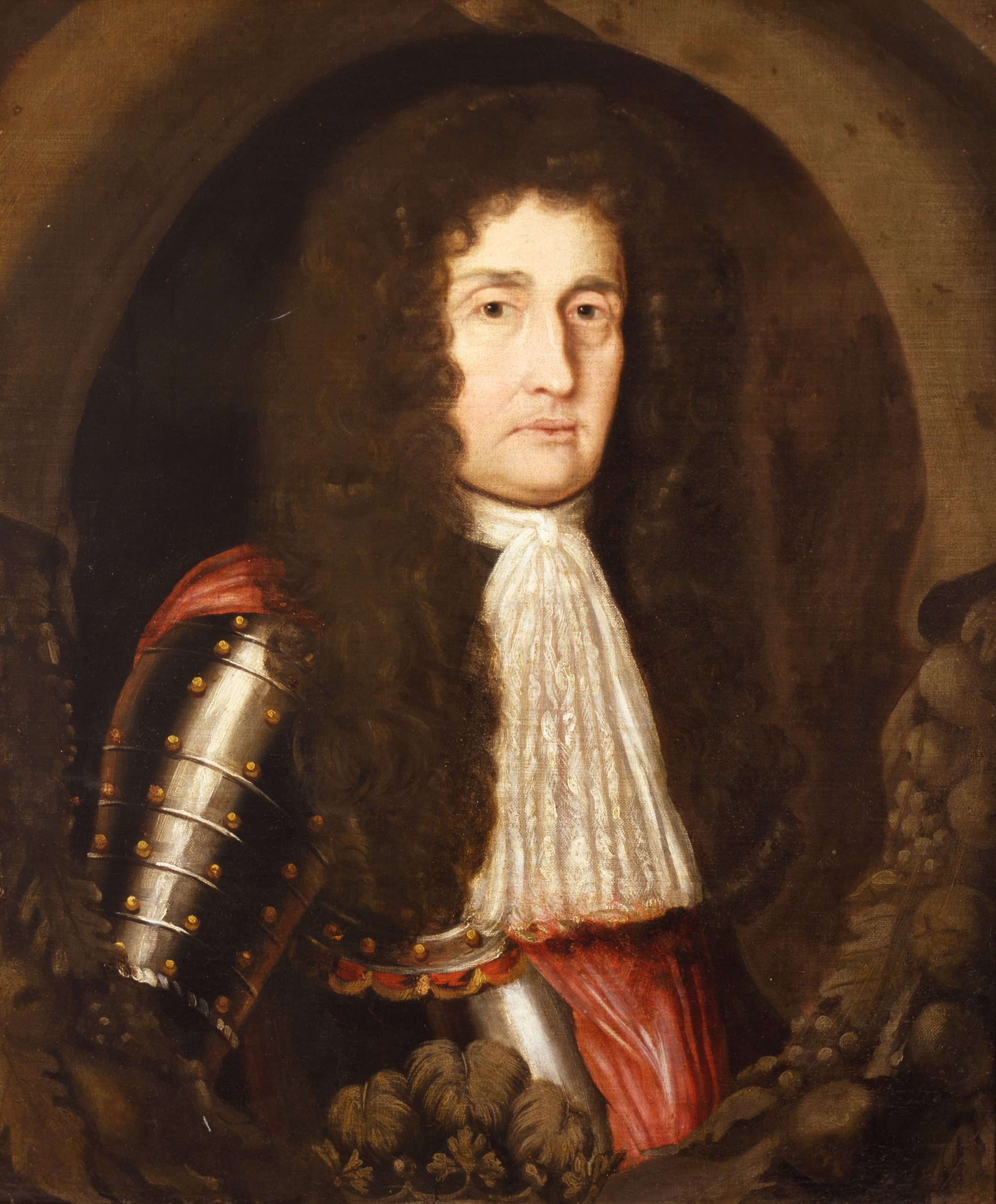
Portrait of Edmund Andros by Mary Beale

=== Church of England ===
Shortly after his arrival, Andros asked each of the Puritan churches in Boston if its meetinghouse could be used for services of the Church of England, but he was consistently rebuffed. He then demanded keys to Samuel Willard's Third Church in 1687, and services were held there under the auspices of Robert Ratcliff until 1688, when King's Chapel was built.

=== Revenue laws ===
After Andros' arrival, the council began a long process of harmonizing laws throughout the dominion to conform more closely to English laws. This work was so time-consuming that Andros issued a proclamation in March 1687 stating that pre-existing laws would remain in effect until they were revised. Massachusetts had no pre-existing tax laws, so a scheme of taxation was developed that would apply to the entire dominion, developed by a committee of landowners. The first proposal derived its revenues from import duties, principally alcohol. After much debate, the committee adopted a different proposal, in essence reviving previous Massachusetts tax laws. These laws had been unpopular with farmers who felt that the taxes were too high on livestock. In order to bring in immediate revenue, Andros also received approval to increase the import duties on alcohol.

The first attempts to enforce the revenue laws were met by stiff resistance from a number of Massachusetts communities. Several towns refused to choose commissioners to assess the town population and estates, and officials from a number of them were consequently arrested and brought to Boston. Some were fined and released, while others were imprisoned until they promised to perform their duties. The leaders of Ipswich had been most vocal in their opposition to the law; they were tried and convicted of misdemeanor offenses.

The other provinces did not resist the imposition of the new law, even though the rates were higher than they had been under the previous colonial administration, at least in Rhode Island. Plymouth's relatively poor landowners were hard hit because of the high rates on livestock.

=== Town meeting laws ===
One consequence of the tax protest was that Andros sought to restrict town meetings, since these were where that protest had begun. He introduced a law that limited meetings to a single annual meeting, solely for the purpose of electing officials, and explicitly banning meetings at other times for any reason. This loss of local power was widely hated. Many protests were made that the town meeting and tax laws were violations of the Magna Carta, which guaranteed taxation by representatives of the people.

=== Land titles and taxes ===
Andros dealt a major blow to the colonists by challenging their title to the land, as the great majority of Americans were land-owners unlike their English equals. Taylor says that they "regarded secure real estate as fundamental to their liberty, status, and prosperity", and the colonists "felt horrified by the sweeping and expensive challenge to their land titles." Andros had been instructed to bring colonial land title practices more in line with those in England, and to introduce quit-rents as a means of raising colonial revenues. Titles issued in Massachusetts, New Hampshire, and Maine under the colonial administration often suffered from defects of form such as lacking an imprint of the colonial seal, and most of them did not include a quit-rent payment. Land grants in colonial Connecticut and Rhode Island had been made before either colony had a charter, and there were conflicting claims in a number of areas.

The manner in which Andros approached the issue was doubly divisive, since it threatened any landowner whose title was in any way dubious. Some landowners went through the confirmation process, but many refused, since they did not want to face the possibility of losing their land, and they viewed the process as a thinly veiled land grab. The Puritans of Plymouth and Massachusetts Bay refused, some of whom had extensive landholdings. All of the existing land titles in Massachusetts had been granted under the now-vacated colonial charter; in essence, Andros declared them to be void and required landowners to recertify their ownership, paying fees to the dominion and becoming subject to the charge of a quit-rent.

Andros attempted to compel the certification of ownership by issuing writs of intrusion, but large landowners who owned many parcels contested these individually, rather than recertifying all of their lands. Few new titles were issued during the Andros regime; only about 20 were approved out of 200 applications.

=== Connecticut charter ===
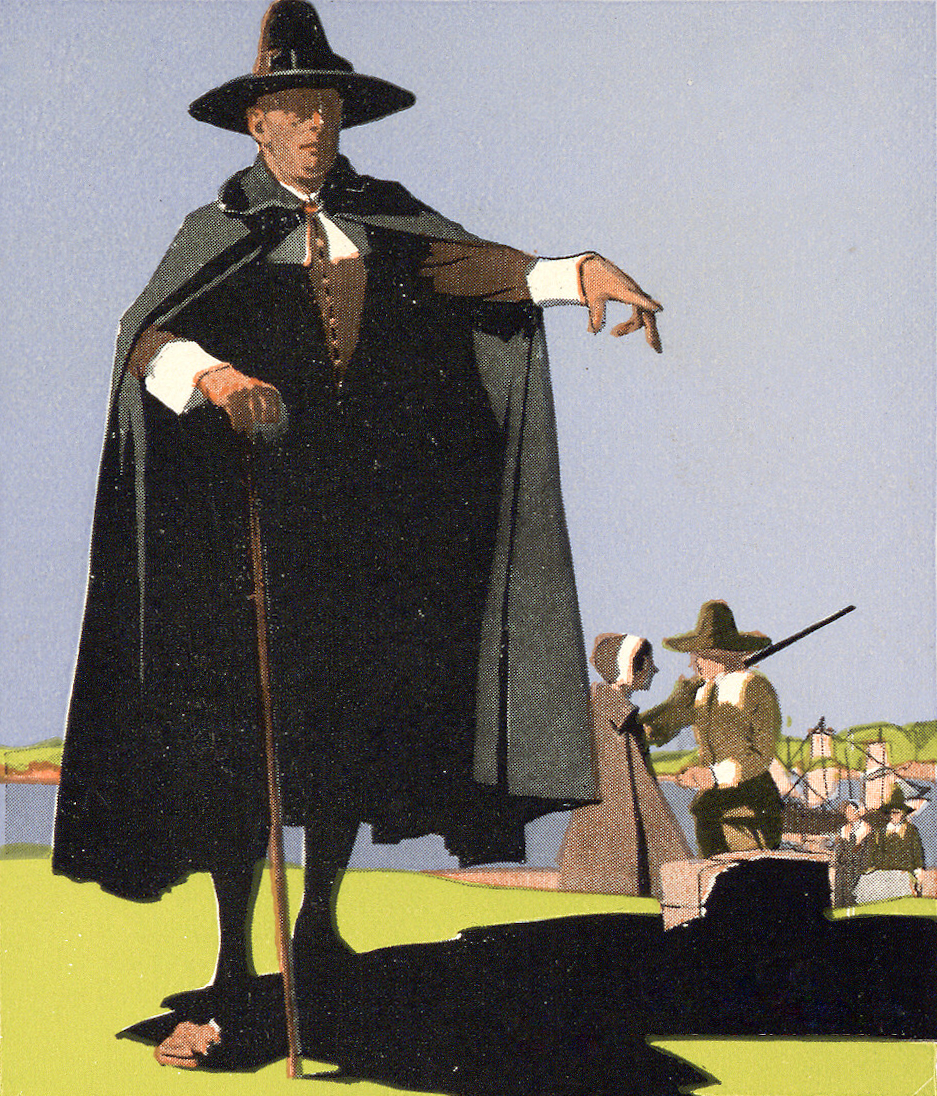
1916 portrait of Robert Treat

Andros' commission included Connecticut, and he asked Connecticut Governor Robert Treat to surrender the colonial charter not long after his arrival in Boston. Connecticut officials formally acknowledged Andros' authority, unlike Rhode Island, whose officials acceded to the dominion but in fact did little to assist him. Connecticut continued to run their government according to the charter, holding quarterly meetings of the legislature and electing colony-wide officials, while Treat and Andros negotiated over the surrender of the charter. In October 1687, Andros finally decided to travel to Connecticut to personally see to the matter. He arrived in Hartford on October 31, accompanied by an honor guard, and met that evening with the colonial leadership. The Colonists lay the charter on a table for all to see during this meeting, but the lights suddenly went out. When the lights were relit, the charter had disappeared. It was said to have been hidden in a nearby oak tree (referred to afterward as the Charter Oak) so that a search of nearby buildings could not locate the document.

Connecticut records show that its government formally surrendered its seals and ceased operation that day. Andros then traveled throughout the colony, making judicial and other appointments before returning to Boston. On December 29, 1687, the dominion council formally extended its laws over Connecticut, completing the assimilation of the New England colonies.

=== Inclusion of New York and the Jerseys ===
The provinces of New York, East Jersey, and West Jersey were added to the Dominion on May 7, 1688. They were remote from Boston where Andros had his seat, so New York and the Jerseys were run by Lieutenant Governor Francis Nicholson from New York City. Nicholson was an army captain and protégé of colonial secretary William Blathwayt who came to Boston in early 1687 as part of Andros' honor guard and had been promoted to his council. During the summer of 1688, Andros traveled first to New York and then to the Jerseys to establish his commission. Dominion governance of the Jerseys was complicated by the fact that the proprietors' charters had been revoked, yet they had retained their property and petitioned Andros for what were traditional manorial rights. The dominion period in the Jerseys was relatively uneventful because of their distance from the power centers and the unexpected end of the Dominion in 1689.

=== Indian diplomacy ===
In 1687, New France Governor Jacques-René de Brisay de Denonville, Marquis de Denonville launched an attack against Seneca villages in western New York. His objective was to disrupt trade between the English at Albany and the Iroquois confederation, to which the Seneca belonged, and to break the Covenant Chain, a peace that Andros had negotiated in 1677 while he was governor of New York. New York Governor Thomas Dongan appealed for help, and King James ordered Andros to render assistance. James also entered into negotiations with Louis XIV of France, which resulted in an easing of tensions on the northwestern frontier.

On New England's northeastern frontier, however, the Abenaki harbored grievances against English settlers, and they began an offensive in early 1688. Andros made an expedition into Maine early in the year, in which he raided a number of Indian settlements. He also raided the trading outpost and home of Jean-Vincent d'Abbadie de Saint-Castin on Penobscot Bay. His careful preservation of the Catholic Castin's chapel was a source of later accusations of "popery" against Andros.

Andros took over the administration of New York in August 1688, and he met with the Iroquois at Albany to renew the covenant. In this meeting, he annoyed the Iroquois by referring to them as "children" (subservient to the English) rather than "brethren" (equals). He returned to Boston amid further attacks on the New England frontier by Abenaki parties, who admitted that they were doing so in part because of French encouragement. The situation in Maine had also deteriorated again, with English colonists raiding Indian villages and shipping the captives to Boston. Andros castigated the Maine colonists for this and ordered the Indians to be released and returned to Maine, earning the hatred of the Maine settlers. He then returned to Maine with a significant force and began the construction of additional fortifications to protect the settlers, including Fort Andross. Andros spent the winter in Maine, and returned to Boston in March upon hearing rumors of revolution in England and discontentment in Boston.

== Glorious Revolution and dissolution ==
The religious leaders of Massachusetts, led by Cotton and Increase Mather, were opposed to the rule of Andros and organized dissent targeted to influence the court in London. King James published the Declaration of Indulgence in May 1687, and Increase Mather sent a letter to thank him for the declaration, and then he suggested to his peers that they also express gratitude to the king as a means to gain favor and influence. Ten pastors agreed to do so, and they decided to send Mather to England to press their case against Andros. Edward Randolph attempted to stop him; Mather was arrested, tried, and exonerated on one charge, but Randolph made a second arrest warrant with new charges. Mather was clandestinely spirited aboard a ship bound for England in April 1688. He and other Massachusetts agents were well received by James, who promised in October 1688 that the colony's concerns would be addressed. However, the events of the Glorious Revolution took over, and James was deposed by William III and Mary II.

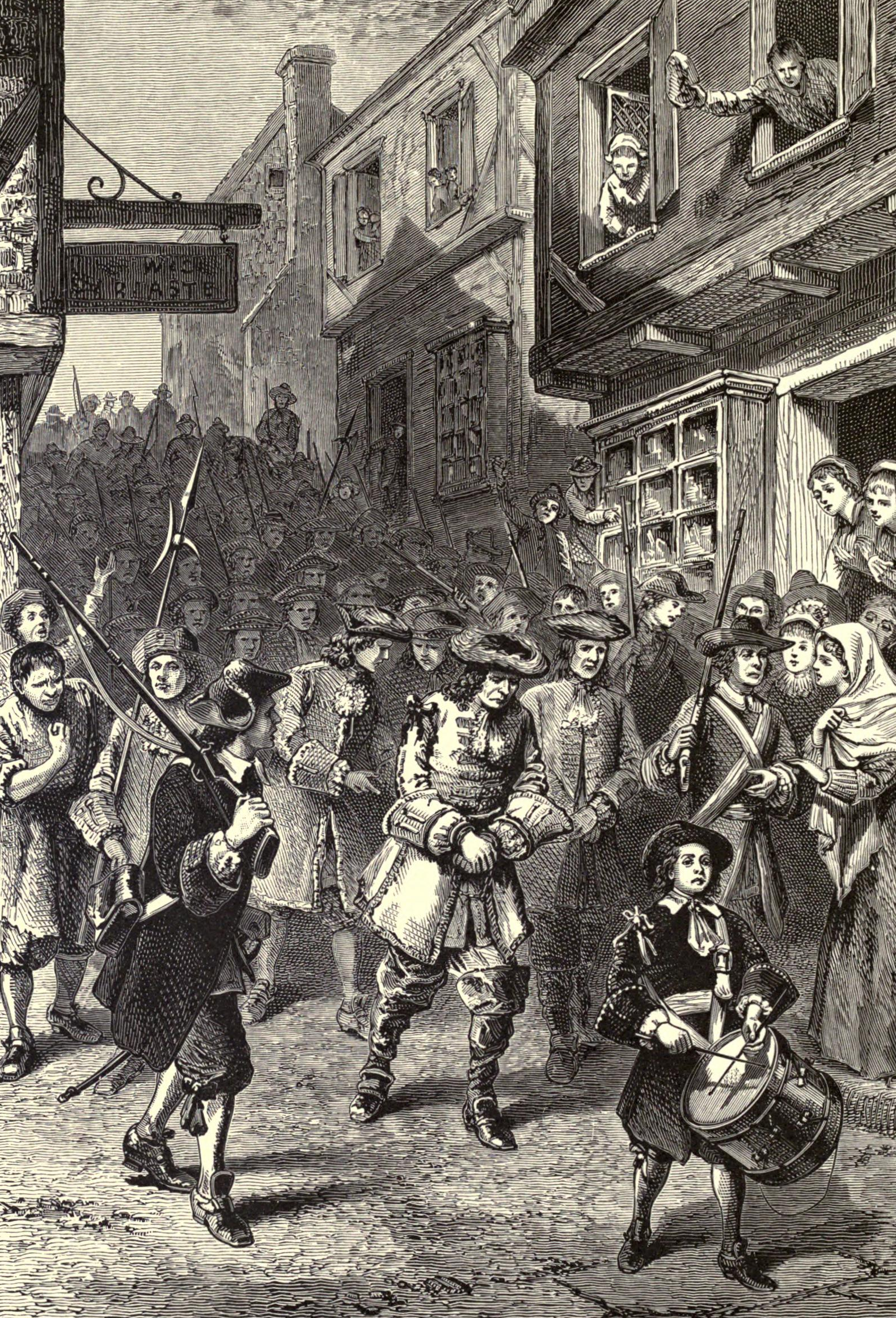
Engraving depicting Andros under arrest

The Massachusetts agents then petitioned the new monarchs and the Lords of Trade for restoration of the old Massachusetts charter. Mather furthermore convinced the Lords of Trade to delay notifying Andros of the revolution. He sent a letter to previous colonial governor Simon Bradstreet containing news that the charter had been illegally annulled and that the magistrates should "prepare the minds of the people for a change." News of the revolution apparently reached some individuals as early as late March, and Bradstreet is one of several possible organizers of the revolt in Boston on April 18, 1689. He and other pre-Dominion magistrates and some members of Andros' council addressed an open letter to Andros on that day calling for his surrender. Andros, Randolph, Dudley, and other dominion supporters were arrested and imprisoned in Boston.

The dominion then effectively collapsed, as local authorities in each colony seized dominion representatives and reasserted their earlier power. In Plymouth, dominion councilor Nathaniel Clark was arrested on April 22, and previous governor Thomas Hinckley was reinstated. Rhode Island authorities resumed the colony's charter with elections on May 1, but previous governor Walter Clarke refused to serve, and the colony continued without one. In Connecticut, the earlier government was also rapidly readopted. New Hampshire was temporarily left without formal government, and came under de facto rule by Massachusetts Governor Simon Bradstreet.

News of the Boston revolt reached New York by April 26, but Lieutenant Governor Nicholson did not take any immediate action. Andros managed to send a message to Nicholson while in captivity. Nicholson received the request for assistance in mid-May, but he was unable to take any effective action due to rising tensions in New York, combined with the fact that most of Nicholson's troops had been sent to Maine. At the end of May, Nicholson was overthrown by local colonists supported by the militia in Leisler's Rebellion, and he fled to England. Leisler governed New York until 1691, when King William commissioned Colonel Henry Sloughter as its governor. Sloughter had Leisler tried on charges of high treason; he was convicted in a trial presided over by Joseph Dudley and then executed.

=== Massachusetts and Plymouth ===
The dissolution of the dominion presented legal problems for Massachusetts and Plymouth. Plymouth never had a royal charter, and the charter of Massachusetts had been revoked. As a result, the restored governments lacked legal foundations for their existence, an issue raised by the political opponents of the leadership. This was particularly problematic in Massachusetts, whose long frontier with New France saw its defenders recalled in the aftermath of the revolt; that area was exposed to French and Indian raids after the outbreak of King William's War in 1689. The cost of colonial defense resulted in a heavy tax burden, and the war also made it difficult to rebuild the colony's trade.

Agents for both colonies worked in England to rectify the charter issues, with Increase Mather petitioning the Lords of Trade for a restoration of the old Massachusetts charter. King William was informed that this would result in a return of the Puritan government, and he wanted to prevent that, so the Lords of Trade decided to solve the issue by combining the two colonies. The resulting Province of Massachusetts Bay combined the territories of Massachusetts and Plymouth along with Martha's Vineyard, Nantucket, and the Elizabeth Islands that had been part of Dukes County in the Province of New York.

== Administrators ==
This is a list of the chief administrators of the Dominion of New England in America from 1684 to 1689:

Name	Title	Date of commission	Date office assumed	Date term ended
Percy Kirke	Governor in Chief (designate) of the Dominion of New England	1684	Appointment withdrawn in 1685	Not applicable
Joseph Dudley	President of the Council of New England	October 8, 1685	May 25, 1686	December 20, 1686
Sir Edmund Andros	Governor in Chief of the Dominion of New England	June 3, 1686	December 20, 1686	April 18, 1689

== Attorney General ==
The Attorney General was an appointed executive officer of the Dominion of New England:

No.	Attorney General	Term	Notes
1	Benjamin Bullivant	July 26, 1686 – April 1687	
2	Giles Masters	April 1687 – August 1687	
3	James Graham	August 1687 – June 1689	

== See also ==
- History of New England
- Malayan Union
- New England Colonies
- New England Confederation
- Rhodesia-Nyasaland
- West Indies Federation
