= Patrick Pery, 6th Earl of Limerick =

Irish peer, banker and public servant

Patrick Edmund Pery, 6th Earl of Limerick KBE, AM, DL (12 April 1930 – 8 January 2003), was an Irish peer, banker and public servant.

== Life ==
Patrick Edmund Pery was the son of Edmund Pery, 5th Earl of Limerick, and Angela, Countess of Limerick. His mother was a daughter of the British Indian Army officer Henry Trotter. He was educated at Eton College and New College, Oxford. As he left Oxford, his father Edmund Pery, 5th Earl of Limerick, told him "You have unfortunately been born with a prefix to your name, and unless you get an equivalent number of suffixes people will assume you are a fool". So among other things he became a chartered accountant.

"Pat Glentworth" (as he then was known) was an athlete and skied for the House of Lords against the House of Commons. As Lord Glentworth, he became a director of the merchant bank Kleinwort Benson, having helped during the merger of Kleinwort and Benson.

In August 1967, on the death of his father, he inherited his seat in the House of Lords and his estate in County Limerick, including the remains of Dromore Castle.

In April 1972, the prime minister, Edward Heath, called Limerick and asked "On the assumption that you were willing to become member of the Conservative party, would you be prepared to serve in the government?" Limerick became Under-Secretary of State for Trade in the new Heath ministry.

On the defeat of the Heath government in 1974, he became President of the Association of British Chambers of Commerce (now the British Chambers of Commerce, the BCC) in succession to Sir Robin Brooke. In that capacity Pat Limerick led the transformation of the ABCC and raised it to a level of national influence at which it was effectively competing with, and sometimes eclipsing, the much younger Confederation of British Industry. At the time the two organisations occupied the same building in Tothill Street / Dean Farrar Street in Westminster.

In its original form, the ABCC, often known as 'The 'Parliament of Commerce', dated back to 1860. After his three-year term of office with the Chambers of Commerce was completed, Lord Limerick then became Chairman of the British Overseas Trade Board 1979–1983, as well as being Chairman of the British Invisible Exports Council from 1975 to 1991. He was chairman of the European-Atlantic Group from 1999 to 2001.

He was a director of banknote printers De La Rue from 1983 to 1997, and chairman from 1993.

In 1991–92 he was Master of the Worshipful Company of World Traders, one of the City of London's 110 livery companies. He was Knight President of the Society of Knights of the Round Table from 1993. He was also Honorary Colonel of The Inns of Court & City Yeomanry.

On 7 September 2001, he was appointed an Honorary Member of the Order of Australia, for service to Australian-British relations.

== Family ==
Patrick Pery married Sylvia Rosalind Lush (CBE), daughter of Brigadier Maurice Stanley Lush, on 22 April 1961. The couple had three children:

- Edmund Christopher Pery, 7th Earl of Limerick (born 10 February 1963)
- Lady Alison Dora Pery (born 27 October 1964)
- Hon. Adrian Patrick Pery (born 14 June 1967)

Peerage of Ireland
Preceded by Edmond Colquhoun Pery	Earl of Limerick; 1967–2003	Succeeded by Edmund Christopher Pery
