= Phrynocephalus forsythii =

Conservation status
- Least Concern (IUCN 3.1)

Scientific classification
- Kingdom: Animalia
- Phylum: Chordata
- Class: Reptilia
- Order: Squamata
- Suborder: Iguania
- Family: Agamidae
- Genus: Phrynocephalus
- Species: P. forsythii

Binomial name
- Phrynocephalus forsythii J. Anderson, 1872

Synonyms
- Phrynocephalus forsythii J. Anderson, 1872; Phrynocephalus theobaldi var. forsythii — Boulenger, 1885; Phrynocephalus forsythii — Wermuth, 1967; Phrynocephalus (Oreosaura) forsythii — Barabanov & Ananjeva, 2007; Phrynocephalus forsythii — Y. Qi et al., 2020

Species of lizard

Phrynocephalus forsythii, also known commonly as Forsyth's toadhead agama and Forsyth's toad-headed lizard, is a species of lizard in the family Agamidae. The species is endemic to China.

== Etymology ==
The specific name, forsythii, is in honor of English diplomat Thomas Douglas Forsyth.

== Geographic range ==
P. forsythii is found in northwestern China, in the Tarim Basin portion of the autonomous region of Xinjiang.

== Habitat ==
The preferred natural habitat of P. forsythii is desert, at altitudes of 887–3,200 m (2,910–10,499 ft).

== Reproduction ==
P. forsythii is ovoviviparous. Litter size is one to six young.
