= Anne Thorne =

British physicist

- Born: Anne Patricia Pery; 3 October 1928 (age 97)
- Education: St Hugh's College, Oxford University
- Spouse: Sir Peter Francis Thorne (m. 1959; died 2004)
- Children: 4
- Parent(s): Edmund Pery, 5th Earl of Limerick; Angela Olivia Trotter
- Scientific career
- Fields: Atomic physics, spectroscopy, interferometry
- Workplaces: Harvard University, Imperial College

Anne Patricia, Lady Thorne (born 3 October 1928) is a physicist specialising in atomic physics and spectroscopy. She is senior research fellow in physics and senior research investigator in the Department of Physics at Imperial College of Science Technology and Medicine. She was the senior tutor for women students at Imperial College, and played a leading role in starting the Imperial College Day Nursery.

== Early life and education ==
Born Anne Patricia Pery, she attended Chelsea Polytechnic, where she sat the London University Intermediate examination in Physics, Chemistry, Pure and Applied Mathematics in 1946. This qualification enabled her to join Oxford University in 1947, where she was a member of St Hugh's College, Oxford. She received a BA Hons degree in Physics and Mathematics in 1950 and stayed on for a further four years as a post-graduate.

== Career ==
After graduating and receiving her PhD, Thorne undertook a year-long research fellowship at Harvard University, where she worked with Professor Norman Ramsey.

In 1955, Thorne joined Imperial College as an assistant lecturer in the Physics department. She was promoted to lecturer in Physics in 1956 and again in 1968 to senior lecturer. During her time at Imperial College, she was the first person to take up the role of senior tutor for women students and successfully argued for the implementation of the Day Nursery, which opened in 1970.

In the 1970s, Thorne worked on vacuum-ultraviolet interferometry and oscillator strengths by Mach–Zehnder interferometry, and in 1974, she published the academic text book Spectrophysics, which was subsequently rewritten as Spectrophysics: Principles and Applications in 1999.

During her tenure at Imperial, Thorne's main non-scientific voluntary work was to improve education. She served on the Governing Boards of 8 different schools and Colleges, both State and Independent. She was the Chairman of Governors of Ardingly College for 5 years.

== Retirement and legacy ==
Thorne retired in 1993, becoming senior research fellow in physics, and then senior research investigator in physics.

Imperial College awards a prize named for Anne Thorne each year to a student whose PhD thesis in experimental physics is concerned with the development or use of new experimental instruments or techniques.

Thorne's former students endearingly termed her 'Lady squared'.

== Family ==
Anne was the daughter of Edmund Colquhoun Pery, 5th Earl of Limerick, and Angela Olivia Trotter.

In 1959 she married Lieutenant Colonel Sir Peter Francis Thorne, with whom she had a son and three daughters.
