= Earl of Limerick =

Title in the peerage of Ireland

Earldom of Limerick
- Arms: Quarterly: 1st & 4th, Quarterly Gules and Or, on a Bend Argent, three Lions passant Sable (for Pery); 2nd & 3rd, Per chevron engrailed Or and Sable, three Pellets in chief, and in base a Stag trippant Or (for Hartstonge). Crests: 1st, A Hind’s Head erased proper ( for Pery); 2nd, A Demi-Saracen supporting on the dexter shoulder a Sword, the point resting on the palm of his hand, the sinister arm extended holding a Battle-Axe, all proper (for Hartstonge). Supporters: Dexter: A Lion Ermine; Sinister: A Fawn proper, ducally collared and chained Or.
- Creation date: 1 January 1803
- Creation: Second
- Created by: George III
- Peerage: Peerage of Ireland
- First holder: Edmund Pery, 1st Viscount Limerick
- Present holder: Edmund, 7th Earl of Limerick
- Heir apparent: Felix, Viscount Glentworth
- Subsidiary titles: Viscount Limerick; Baron Glentworth; Baron Foxford (United Kingdom)
- Status: Extant
- Former seat: Dromore Castle
- Motto: VIRTUTE NON ASTUTIA (By courage, not by craft)

Earl of Limerick
- Arms: Quarterly: 1st & 4th, Gules, three Lions passant Or, supporting with the dexter forepaw a Helmet close Argent, garnished Gold (Dongan); 2nd & 3rd, Azure, six Plates, three, two and one, on a Chief Or, a Demi-Lion Gules (Dungan). Crest: A Lion passant Or, supporting with the dexter forepaw a Helmet close Argent, garnished Gold. Supporters: On either side a Lion Argent, gouttée-de-sang, charged on the shoulder with a Pellet.
- Creation date: 2 January 1686
- Creation: First
- Created by: James II
- Peerage: Peerage of Ireland
- First holder: William Dongan, 1st Earl of Limerick
- Last holder: Thomas Dongan, 2nd Earl of Limerick
- Subsidiary titles: Viscount Dungan; Baronet 'of Castletown'
- Status: Extinct
- Extinction date: 14 December 1715

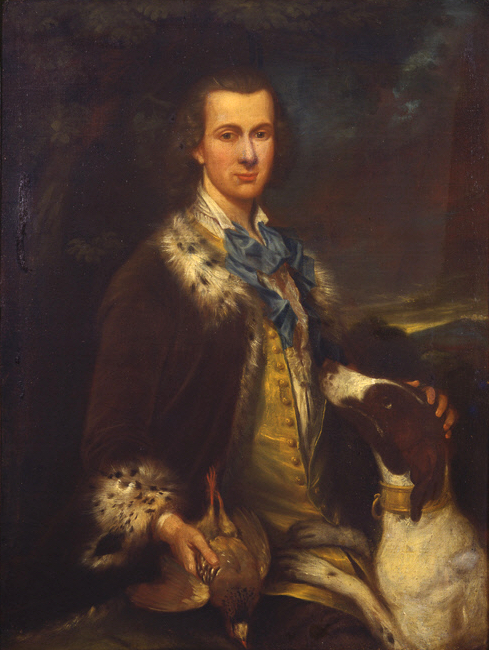
Thomas Dongan, 2nd Earl of Limerick.

Earl of Limerick is a title that has been created twice in the Peerage of Ireland, associated first with the Dongan family, then with the Pery family. It should not be confused with the title Viscount of the City of Limerick (usually shortened to Viscount of Limerick, or Lord Limerick) held by the Hamilton family, also Earls of Clanbrassil.

== First creation ==
The earldom was created for the first time in 1686 for Sir William Dongan, 4th Baronet, with remainder, failing male issue of his own, to his brothers Robert, Michael and Thomas and the heirs male of their bodies. He had been made Viscount Dungan, of Clane in the County of Kildare in 1661, also in the Peerage of Ireland and with similar remainder. His only son Walter Dungan, Viscount Dungan, was killed at the Battle of the Boyne and Lord Limerick was succeeded according to the special remainders (and normally in the baronetcy) by his brother Thomas Dongan, the second Earl. He was Governor of New York from 1683 to 1688. All three titles became extinct on his death in 1715. The Dungan Baronetcy, of Castletown in the County of Kildare, was created in the Baronetage of Ireland in 1623 for Walter Dungan. He was the eldest son of John Dongan or Dungan (died 1592), originally of Fishamble Street, Dublin and his wife Margaret Forster. John Dongan was a civil servant who became a figure of some importance in the Irish Government, and was rich enough in later life to acquire substantial estates in County Kildare.

== Second creation ==
The title was created for the second time in 1803 in favour of Edmund Pery, 1st Viscount Limerick. He was the son of the Right Reverend William Pery, Bishop of Limerick from 1784 to 1794. In 1790 the latter was raised to the Peerage of Ireland as Baron Glentworth, of Mallow in the County of Cork. He was succeeded by his only son, the second Baron. He represented Limerick City in the Irish House of Commons and was a supporter of the Union with Great Britain. On 29 December 1800 he was created Viscount Limerick, of the City of Limerick, and on 11 February 1803, he was further honoured when he was made Earl of Limerick, of the County of Limerick. Both titles were in the Peerage of Ireland. Lord Limerick sat in the House of Lords as one of the 28 original Irish representative peer from 1800 to 1844. In 1815 he was also created Baron Foxford, of Stackpole Court in the County of Limerick, in the Peerage of the United Kingdom, giving him a permanent seat in the Lords. His great-grandson, the third Earl, was a Conservative and Unionist politician and served as Captain of the Yeomen of the Guard from 1889 to 1892 and from 1895 to 1896. He was succeeded by his eldest son, the fourth Earl. He died without surviving male issue and was succeeded by his half-brother, the fifth Earl. He was a soldier and also served as President of the Medical Research Council between 1952 and 1960. His eldest son, the sixth Earl, was a successful businessman. Lord Limerick also served as Under-Secretary of State of Trade from 1972 to 1974 in the Conservative administration of Edward Heath. As of 2014, the titles are held by his son, the seventh Earl, who succeeded in 2003.

Another member of the Pery family was Edmund Pery, 1st Viscount Pery, Speaker of the Irish House of Commons from 1771 to 1785. He was the elder brother of the first Baron Glentworth.

Some heirs to the earldom have used the title Viscount Glentworth as a courtesy title (instead of the "real" title of Baron Glentworth), although there is no such peerage.

The family seat was Dromore Castle, near Pallaskenry, County Limerick.

== Dongan Baronets, of Castletown (1623) ==
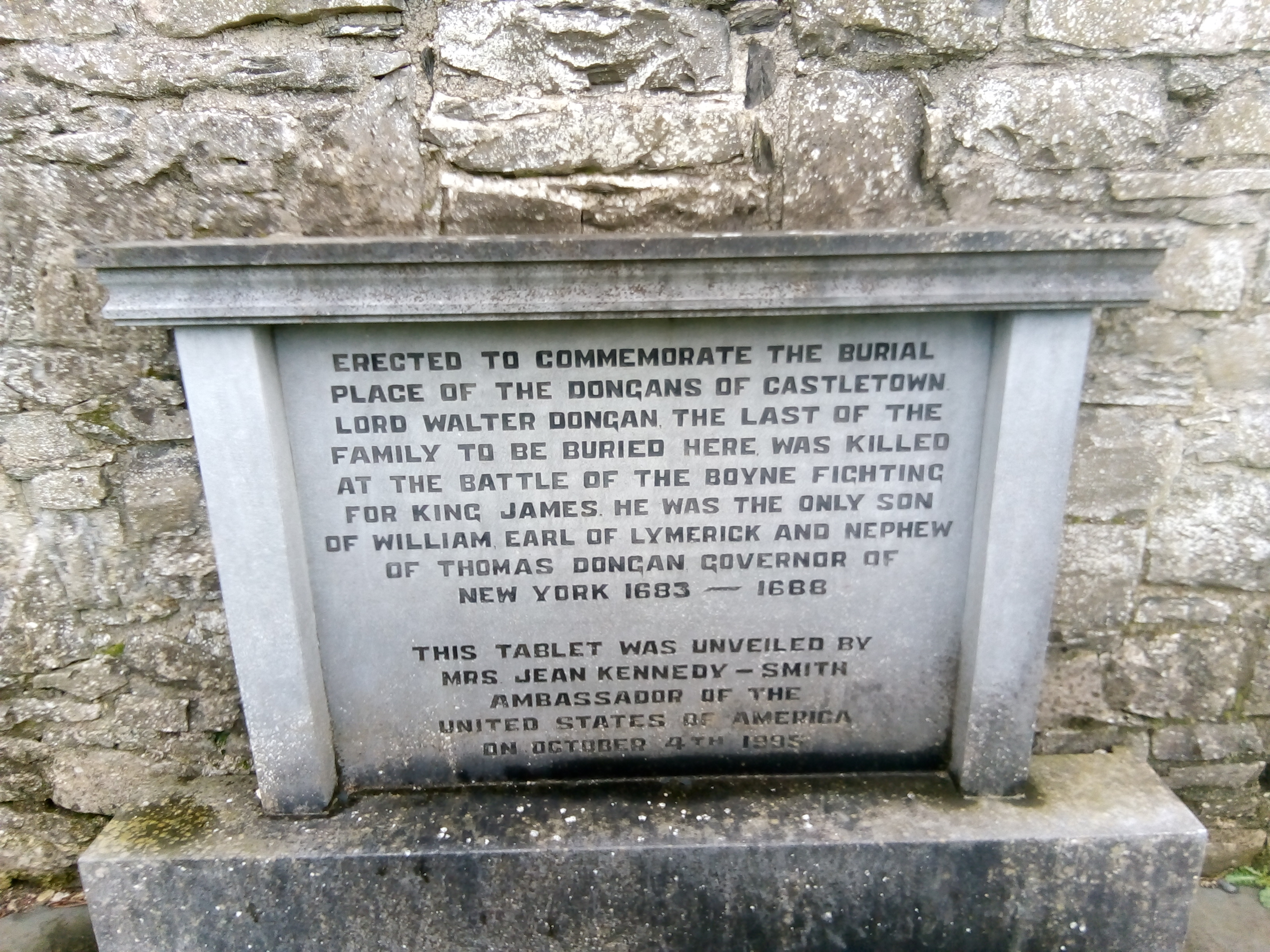
Dongan family tomb, Tea Lane Graveyard, Celbridge

- Sir Walter Dongan, 1st Baronet (died 1626)
- Sir John Dongan, 2nd Baronet (died 1650)
- Sir Walter Dongan, 3rd Baronet (died 1686)
- Sir William Dongan, 4th Baronet (died 1698) (created Earl of Limerick in 1686)

== Earls of Limerick, first creation (1686) ==
- William Dongan, 1st Earl of Limerick (died 1698)
- Thomas Dongan, 2nd Earl of Limerick (1634–1715)

== Barons Glentworth (1790) ==
- William Cecil Pery, 1st Baron Glentworth (1721–1794)
- Edmund Henry Pery, 2nd Baron Glentworth (1758–1844) (created Earl of Limerick in 1803)

== Viscount Limerick (1800); Earls of Limerick, second creation (1803) ==
- Edmund Henry Pery, 1st Earl of Limerick (1758–1844)
- William Henry Tennison Pery, 2nd Earl of Limerick (1812–1866)
- William Hale John Charles Pery, 3rd Earl of Limerick (1840–1896)
- William Henry Edmund de Vere Sheaffe Pery, 4th Earl of Limerick (1863–1929)
- Edmond Colquhoun Pery, 5th Earl of Limerick (1888–1967)
- Patrick Edmund Pery, 6th Earl of Limerick (1930–2003)
- Edmund Christopher Pery, 7th Earl of Limerick (born 1963)

The heir apparent is the present holder's son Felix Edmund Pery, Viscount Glentworth (born 1991).
