= Benjamin Bullivant =

1st Attorney General of the Dominion of New England
- In office July 26, 1686 – April 1687
- Appointed by: Joseph Dudley
- Preceded by: None
- Succeeded by: Giles Masters

Clerk of the Superior Court
- Preceded by: None
- Succeeded by: Giles Masters

Personal details
- Profession: Physician; Apothecary

Benjamin Bullivant was appointed by Joseph Dudley as the first Attorney General of the Dominion of New England.

Bullivant was a founder, and the first churchwarden of King's Chapel, Boston.

Bullivant was brought up in a noble household in England, and resided in London prior to moving to Thirteen Colonies. By roughly 1685, Bullivant moved from London to Boston. Bullivant's professions were that of a Physician and Apothecary.

While living in Boston, Bullivant was apprehensive on becoming Attorney General, but because of his knowledge of the laws, he was forced to accept the position. According to friend of Bullivant, John Dunton, Bullivant's stint as Attorney General was not extreme and focused more on peaceful approaches to problems.

Bullivant likely brought a wife over from England, as his daughter Hannah was baptized January 3, 1685/86, at the Old South Church. Although it seems neither he nor his wife were members of said church.

Bullivant was the Senior Warden of King's Chapel from 1686-1687.

Bullivant was appointed to Attorney General under Edmund Andros, Governor of the Dominion of New England. Andros' rule as governor was authoritarian and turbulent, which caused him to be overthrown in the 1689 Boston revolt. Bullivant, who had played a "conspicuous" part during his administration was in turn arrested and imprisoned for 8 weeks in a common jail. He was then detained for many months in Boston before escaping to England, after his petitions to the King of England. Although it seems he must have returned to Boston later in his life.

Legal offices
Preceded by	Attorney General of the Dominion of New England; July 26, 1686–April 1687	Succeeded by Giles Masters
Preceded by	Clerk of the Superior Court of the Dominion of New England; November 2, 1686–	Succeeded by
