= Tea Lane Graveyard =

Cemetery in Celbridge, County Kildare, Ireland

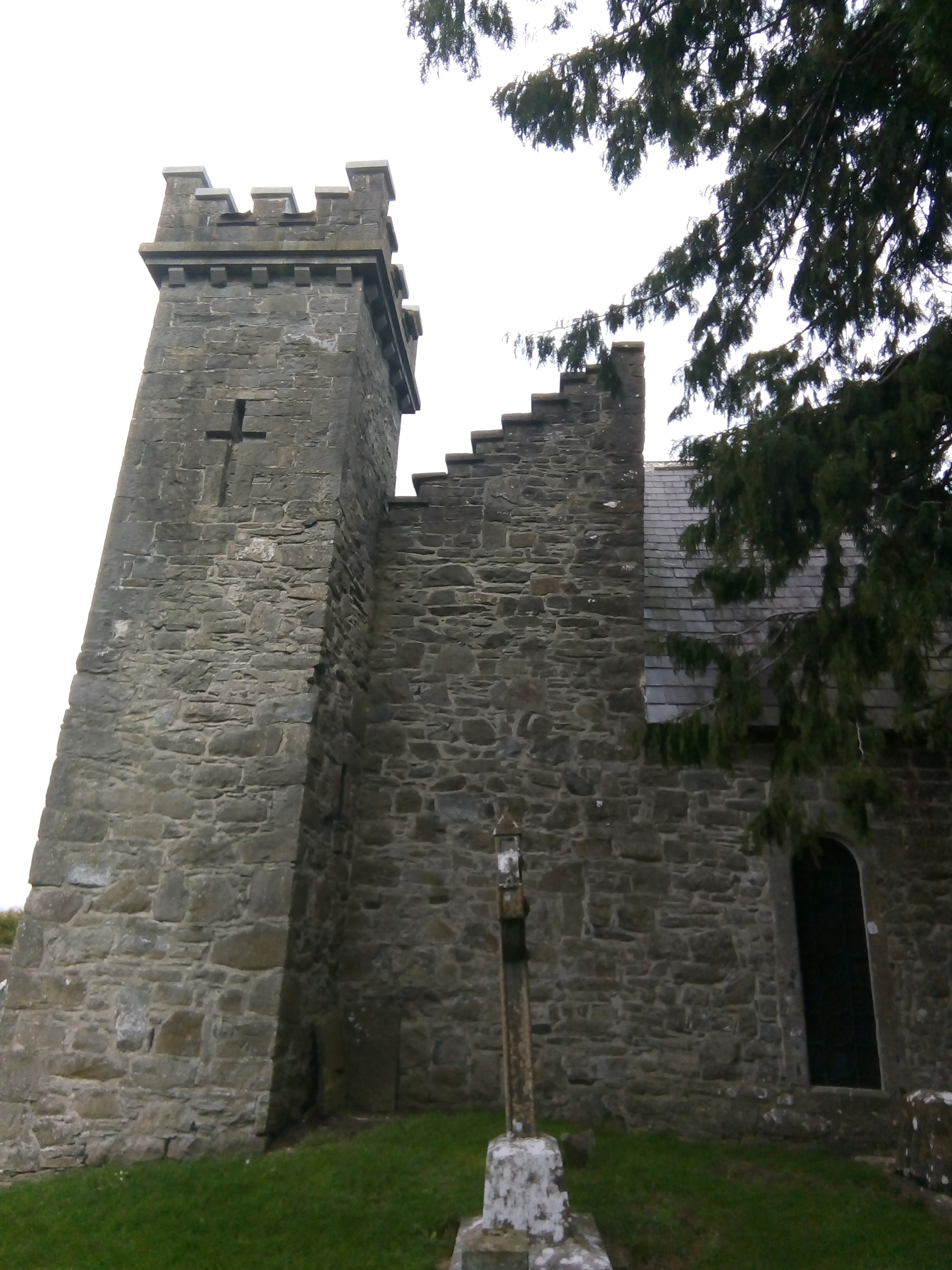
- Conolly chapel
- Interactive map of Tea Lane Graveyard

Details
- Established: 7th century AD
- Location: Church Road, Celbridge, County Kildare
- Country: Ireland
- Coordinates: 53.338772°N 6.546788°W
- Type: Christian
- Style: Rural cemetery
- Owned by: Glasnevin Trust
- Size: 3,140 m^{2} (33,800 sq ft)
- No. of graves: 19,400
- Website: tealanegraveyard.com
- Find a Grave: Tea Lane Graveyard

Tea Lane Graveyard (Irish: Reilig Lána an Tae) is a Christian cemetery located in Celbridge, Ireland.

== History ==
The site is located 500 m northwest of the River Liffey and is the reputed burial site of Saint Mochua of Timahoe (died 657). Mochua built a wooden church on the site and was the first abbot of Clondalkin. It stood on the Slighe Mhor, an ancient roadway which ran from Dublin to Galway.

The Normans handed over control of St Mochua's church to the Abbey Church of Saint Thomas the Martyr, Dublin in 1215; the abbey supplied Celbridge with its priests. After the Dissolution of the Monasteries the abbey was suppressed and came into the possession of the Anglican Church of Ireland.

The present church building was built c. 1860, incorporating material from the medieval church (c. 1600).

The placename dates to the 19th century, when many English workers were brought over to work at Celbridge mill; the locals noted the large amounts of tea they drank, and the tealeaves that they threw into the roadway, and Church Lane was nicknamed "Tea Lane."

== Gallery ==
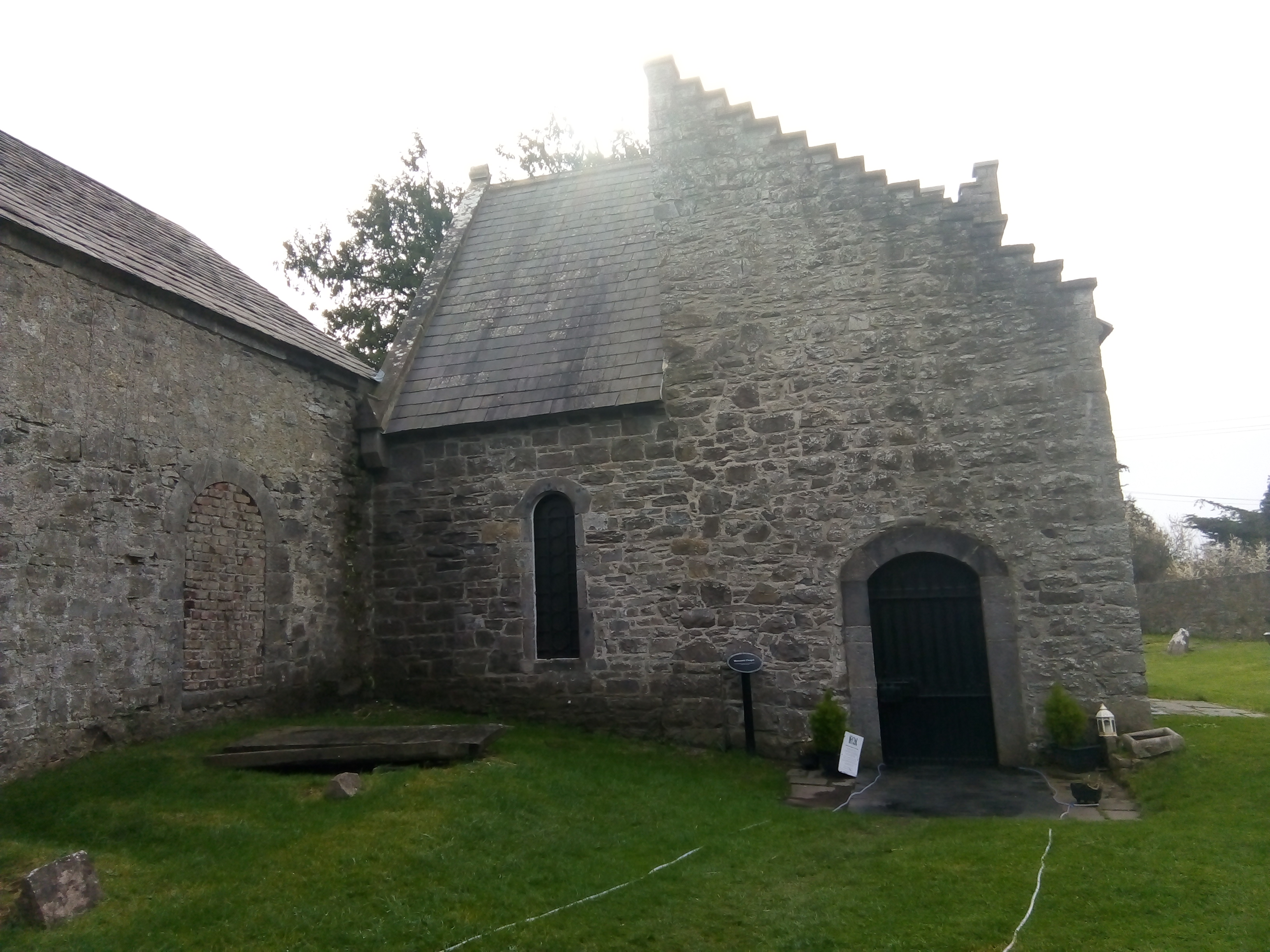
Mortuary chapel

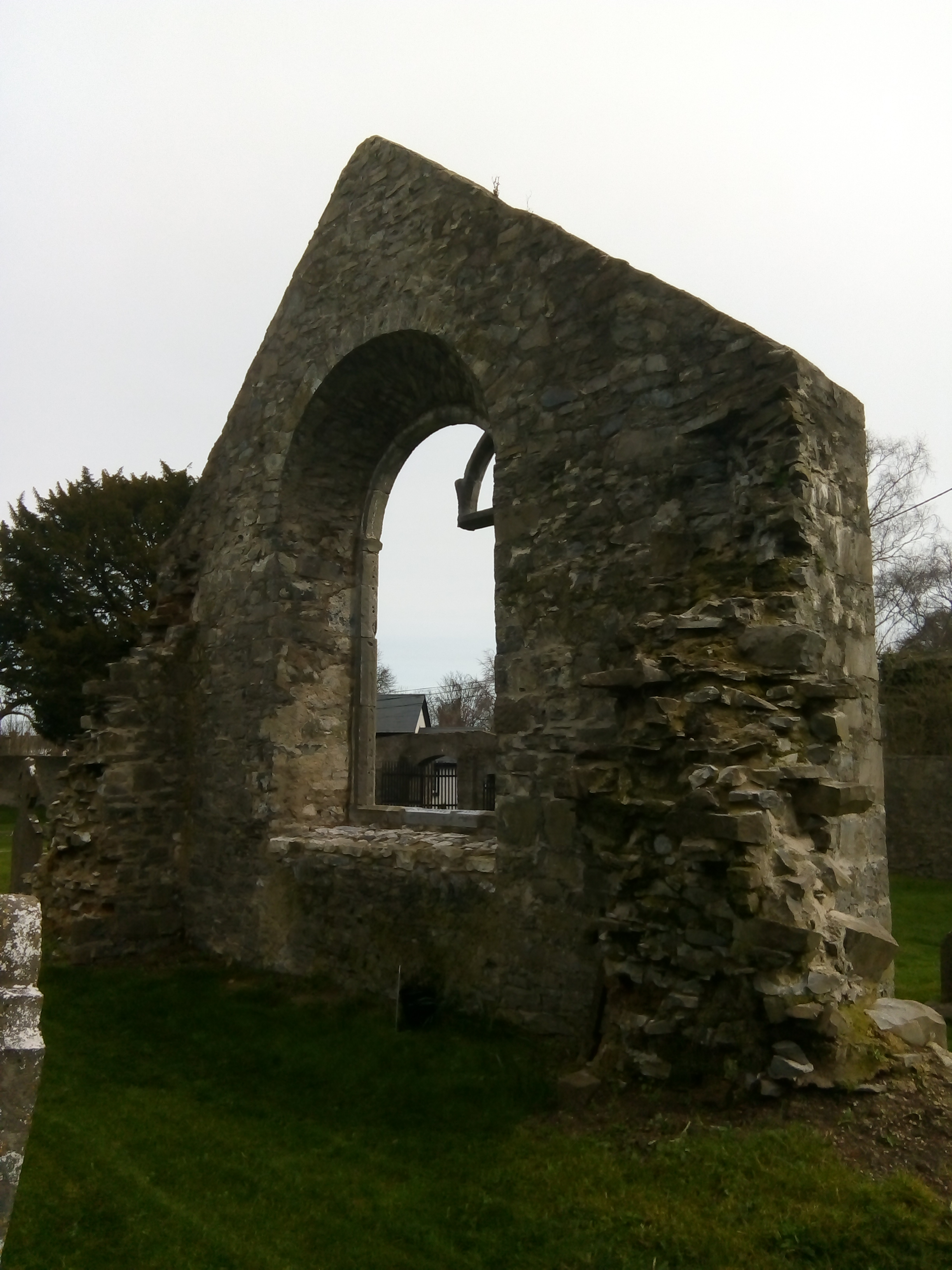
Ruined medieval church, with tracery fragment visible in the windowframe

== Notable burials ==
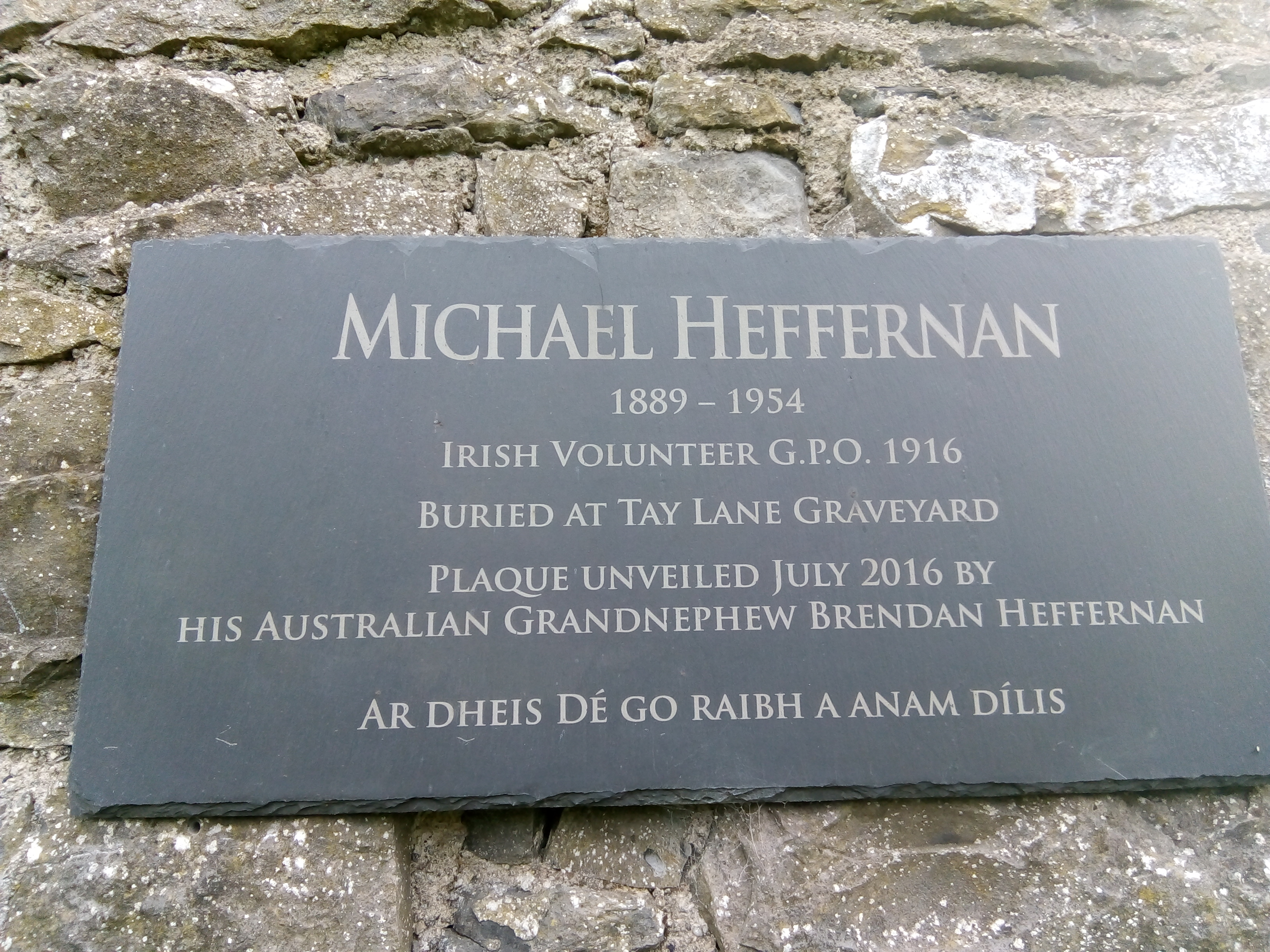
Memorial plaque to Vol. Michael Heffernan

- Katherine Conolly (1662–1752), wife of William Conolly
- Lady Louisa Conolly (1743–1821), one of the famous Lennox Sisters
- William Conolly (1662–1729), Speaker of the Irish House of Commons and builder of Castletown House
- Many of the Dongan family
- Henry Grattan Jnr (1789–1859), Whig Member of Parliament
- Vol. Michael Heffernan (1889–1954); member of the Irish Volunteers and Irish Republican Army and fought in the 1916 Easter Rising, Irish War of Independence and Irish Civil War (on the anti-Treaty side)
- Saint Mochua of Timahoe (d. 657)
- Air Mechanic, Second Class C.J. Sheridan, Royal Air Force (1900–1921); the only World War soldier in Tea Lane
