= William Pery, 3rd Earl of Limerick =

Irish peer and politician

The Right Honourable The Earl of Limerick KP PC DL JP
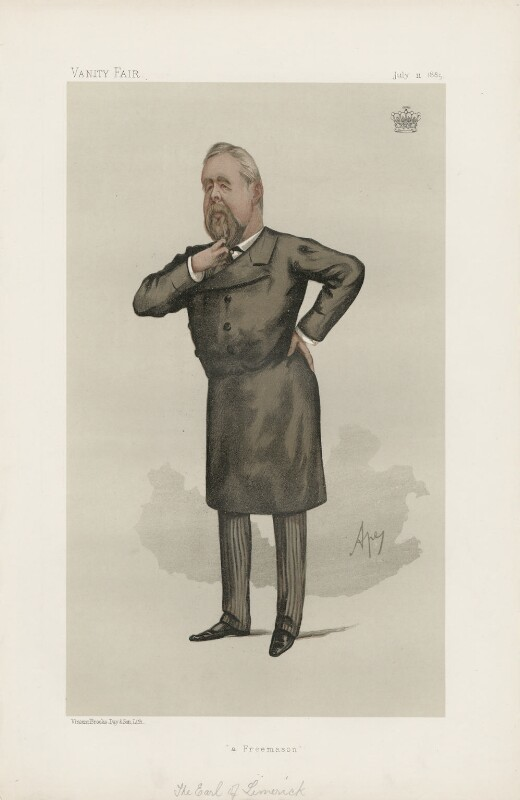

Captain of the Yeomen of the Guard
- In office 29 January 1889 – 11 August 1892
- Monarch: Victoria
- Prime Minister: The Marquess of Salisbury
- Preceded by: The Earl of Kintore
- Succeeded by: The Lord Kensington
- In office 16 July 1895 – 8 August 1896
- Monarch: Victoria
- Prime Minister: The Marquess of Salisbury
- Preceded by: The Lord Kensington
- Succeeded by: The Earl Waldegrave

Personal details
- Born: 17 January 1840
- Died: 8 August 1896 (aged 56)
- Party: Conservative
- Spouses: Caroline Maria Gray (m. 1862; died 1877); Isabella Colquhoun (m. 1877)
- Children: William Pery, 4th Earl of Limerick; Edmund Pery, 5th Earl of Limerick

William Hale John Charles Pery, 3rd Earl of Limerick, KP, PC, DL, JP (17 January 1840 – 8 August 1896), styled Viscount Glentworth until 1866, was an Irish peer and Conservative politician. He served as Captain of the Yeomen of the Guard under Lord Salisbury between 1889 and 1892 and again between 1895 and his death in 1896. In 1892 he was made a Knight of the Order of St Patrick.

== Early life ==
Limerick was the son of William Pery, 2nd Earl of Limerick, and his first wife Susanna, daughter of William Sheaffe. His mother died when he was one year old.

== Political career ==
Lord Limerick succeeded his father in the earldom in 1866 and took his seat on the Conservative benches in the House of Lords. When the Conservatives came to power under Lord Salisbury in 1886, he was appointed a Lord-in-waiting.

In 1889 he was promoted to Captain of the Yeomen of the Guard, a post he held until 1892, and again between 1895 and his death in 1896.

In 1889 he was sworn of the Privy Council. Limerick was also a Deputy Lieutenant and Justice of the Peace and an aide-de-camp to Queen Victoria. In 1892 he was made a Knight of the Order of St Patrick.

== Family ==
Lord Limerick was twice married. He married firstly his cousin, Caroline Maria, daughter of Reverend Henry Gray, on 28 August 1862. They had one child, William Pery, 4th Earl of Limerick. Caroline died on 24 January 1877. Limerick married secondly Isabella, daughter of James Charles Henry Colquhoun, on 20 October 1877. They had several children, including Edmund Pery, 5th Earl of Limerick.

== Death ==
Lord Limerick died in August 1896, aged 56, and was succeeded in the earldom and his other titles by his son from his first marriage, William. The Countess of Limerick married Major Sir Edmund Elliot in 1898 and died in November 1927.

Political offices
Preceded by The Earl of Kintore	Captain of the Yeomen of the Guard; 1889–1892	Succeeded by The Lord Kensington
Preceded by The Lord Kensington	Captain of the Yeomen of the Guard; 1895–1896	Succeeded by The Earl Waldegrave
Party political offices
Preceded by The Earl of Kintore	Conservative Chief Whip in the House of Lords; 1889–1896	Succeeded by The Earl Waldegrave
Peerage of Ireland
Preceded by William Pery	Earl of Limerick; 1866–1896	Succeeded by William Pery
