= Edmund Pery, 5th Earl of Limerick =

British peer and soldier

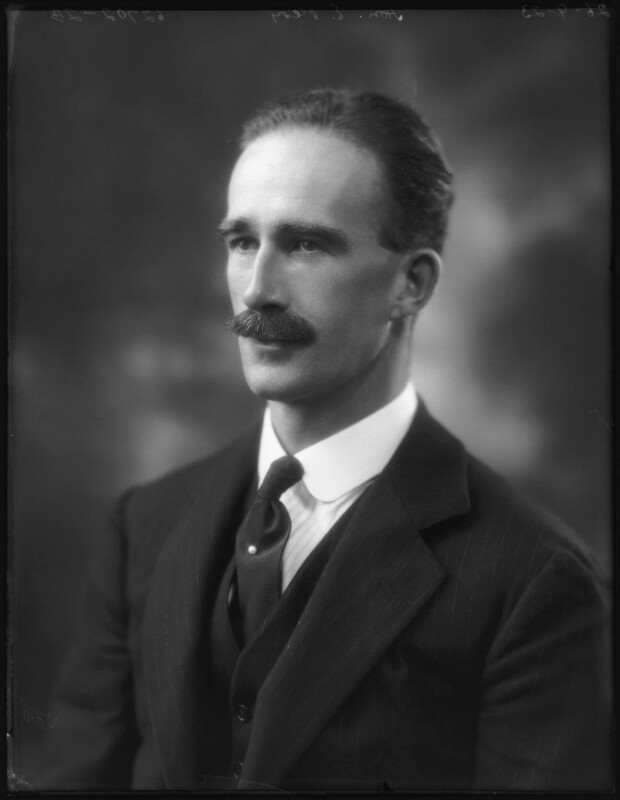
Pery in 1923

Colonel Edmund Colquhoun Pery, 5th Earl of Limerick GBE CH KCB DSO TD (16 October 1888 – 4 August 1967) was a British peer and soldier.

== Life ==
Pery was the eldest son of the 3rd Earl of Limerick and his second wife, Isabella, and was educated at Eton and New College, Oxford. He was commissioned into the City of London Yeomanry and during World War I he fought in Egypt, France and at the Battle of Gallipoli, ending the war as a Major. After the war, Pery continued to serve in the City of London Yeomanry, which became a Royal Artillery brigade, and inherited his half-brother's titles in 1929.

Lord Limerick was an Honorary Colonel of the City of London Yeomanry (TA) from 1932–52, Vice-Chairman from 1937–41 and then Chairman of the City of London Territorial and Auxiliary Forces Association from 1941–50 and Vice-Chairman from 1942–49, then Chairman from 1949–54, then President of the Council of Territorial and Auxiliary Forces Associations from 1954–56. He was also Chairman of the Medical Research Council from 1952–60.

His GBE in 1954 and his CH in 1960 were matched by his wife Angela's GBE in 1954 and her CH in 1974. They are the only married couple in British history both awarded these two top honours, and even to both hold the GBE. Also – until Lady Antonia Fraser's 2017 CH matched her Nobel Literature Laureate husband Harold Pinter's 2008 CH – the only married couple both awarded the CH.

== Family ==
On 1 June 1926, he had married Angela Olivia Trotter (1897–1981), a daughter of Lt Col. Sir Henry Trotter; they had three children:

- Lady Anne Patricia Pery (born 1928), married Sir Peter Francis Thorne, becoming Lady Anne Thorne. She was an eminent lecturer in Physics at the Blackett Laboratory, Imperial College of Science and Technology, London.
- Patrick Edmund, Viscount Glentworth (1930–2003)
- The Hon. Michael Henry Colquhoun Pery (8 May 1937 – 19 May 2021)

In 1954, his wife Angela was elevated to Dame Grand Cross of the Order of the British Empire (GBE) and in 1974, she was made a Member of the Order of the Companions of Honour (CH).

Lord Limerick died of suicide in 1967 after a protracted bout of arthritis. His titles were inherited by his elder son, Patrick, who died in 2003.

Peerage of Ireland
Preceded by William Pery	Earl of Limerick; 1929–1967	Succeeded by Patrick Edmund Pery
