= Nugent baronets of Moyrath (1622) =

Nugent Baronetcy, of Moyrath
- Arms of the Nugent baronets of Moyrath
- Creation date: 14 January 1622
- Baronetage: Baronetage of Ireland
- Status: Extinct
- Extinction date: 1710

The Nugent Baronetcy, of Moyrath in the County of Westmeath, was created in the Baronetage of Ireland on 14 January 1622 for Thomas Nugent. The title became extinct by forfeit after the death of the third Baronet in 1710.

== Nugent Baronets, of Moyrath (1622) ==
- Sir Thomas Nugent, 1st Baronet (died c. 1665)
- Sir Robert Nugent, 2nd Baronet (died 1675)
- Sir Thomas Nugent, 3rd Baronet (died 1710). His two sons John and Richard were attainted for treason, and the title was forfeited. It was, however, assumed by self-styled successors until c.1780.
