= Thomas Dongan, 2nd Earl of Limerick =

Irish military officer and colonial administrator (1634–1715)

The Right Honourable The Earl of Limerick
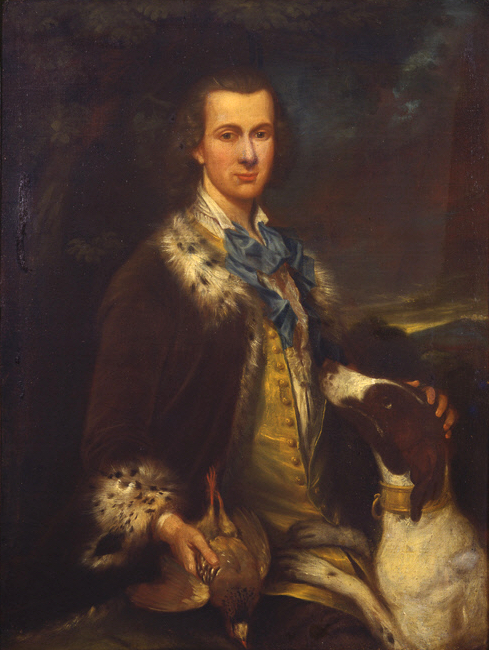
- Portrait of Dongan from Castleton Manor, Staten Island

Governor of New York
- In office August 1683 – 11 August 1688
- Monarchs: Charles II; James II & VII
- Preceded by: Edmund Andros
- Succeeded by: Edmund Andros (as Governor-General of the Dominion of New England)

Personal details
- Born: 1634 Castletown Kildrought, Ireland
- Died: 14 December 1715 (aged 81) London, England
- Relations: Sir William Talbot, 1st Baronet (grandfather); Sir Robert Talbot, 2nd Baronet (uncle); Peter Talbot (uncle); Richard Talbot, 1st Earl of Tyrconnell
- Parent(s): Sir John Dongan, 2nd Baronet; Mary Talbot

Thomas Dongan, 2nd Earl of Limerick (Note: Other spellings of Dongan's last name include: Duggan and Dungon, and even Duncan or Doñea.) (1634 – 14 December 1715) was an Irish military officer and colonial administrator who served as the governor of New York from 1683 to 1688. He called the first representative legislature in the Province of New York and granted the colony's first charter of liberties. Dongan's negotiations and subsequent alliance with the Iroquois brought a degree of security from attacks by the French and their Indian allies.

== Early life and family ==
Dongan was born in 1634 into an old Gaelic Norman (Irish Catholic) family in Castletown Kildrought (now Celbridge), County Kildare, in the Kingdom of Ireland, the seventh and youngest son of Sir John Dongan, 2nd Baronet. He was a member of the Irish Parliament, and his wife Mary Talbot, daughter of Sir William Talbot, 1st Baronet, and Alison Netterville. Dongan's maternal uncles were Peter Talbot, Archbishop of Dublin (1673–1679), and Richard Talbot, 1st Earl of Tyrconnell, who was lord-deputy of Ireland during the reign of James II. After the beheading of Charles I, Dongan's father, a supporter of the House of Stuart, and his family, fled to France, where Thomas obtained a commission in the French Royal Army.

== Career ==
While in France, he served in an Irish regiment of the French army under George Hamilton, Comte d'Hamilton. He stayed in France after the Stuart Restoration and achieved the rank of colonel in 1674.

After the Treaty of Nijmegen ended the Franco-Dutch War in 1678, Dongan returned to England in obedience to the order that recalled all English subjects in French military service. Fellow officer James, Duke of York, arranged to have him granted a high-ranking commission in the English Army force designated for service in Flanders and a pension. That same year, he was appointed lieutenant-governor of English Tangier, which had been granted to England as part of the dowry of Catherine of Braganza. He served as part of the Tangier Garrison which defended the settlement.

== Governor of New York ==
In September 1682, James, Duke of York, as Lord Proprietor of the Province of New York, appointed Dongan as vice-admiral in the Royal Navy and governor to replace Edmund Andros "Dongan's long service in the French army had made him conversant with the French character and diplomacy and his campaigns in the Low Countries had given him a knowledge of the Dutch language." James also granted him an estate on Staten Island. The estate eventually became the town of Castleton; later, another section of the island was named Dongan Hills in his honor.

Dongan landed in Boston on 10 August 1683, crossed Long Island Sound, and passed through the small settlements in the eastern part of the island and he made his way to Fort James, arriving on 25 August. In October, Rev. Henry Selyns reported to the Amsterdam Classis, "...our new governor has at last arrived. His excellency is a person of knowledge refinement and modesty. I have had the pleasure of receiving a call from him and I have the privilege of calling on him whenever I desire."

In 1683, at the time of Dongan's appointment the province was bankrupt and in a state of rebellion. Dongan was able to restore order and stability. On October 14 of that year he convened the first-ever representative assembly in New York history at Fort James. The New York General Assembly, under the supervision of Dongan, passed the Charter of Liberties and Privileges. It decreed that the supreme legislative power under the Duke of York shall reside in a governor, council, and the people convened in general assembly; conferred upon the members of the assembly rights and privileges making them a body coequal to and independent of the Parliament of England; established town, county, and general courts of justice; solemnly proclaimed the right of religious liberty; and passed acts enunciating certain constitutional liberties, e.g. taxes could be levied only by the people met in general assembly; right of suffrage; and no martial law or quartering of the soldiers without the consent of the inhabitants.

Dongan soon incurred the ill will of William Penn who was negotiating with the Iroquois for the purchase of the upper Susquehanna Valley. Dongan went to Albany, and declared that the sale would be "prejudicial to His Highness's interests". The Cayugas sold the property to New York with the consent of the Mohawk. Years later, when back in England and in favour at the Court of James II, Penn would use his influence to prejudice the king against Dongan.

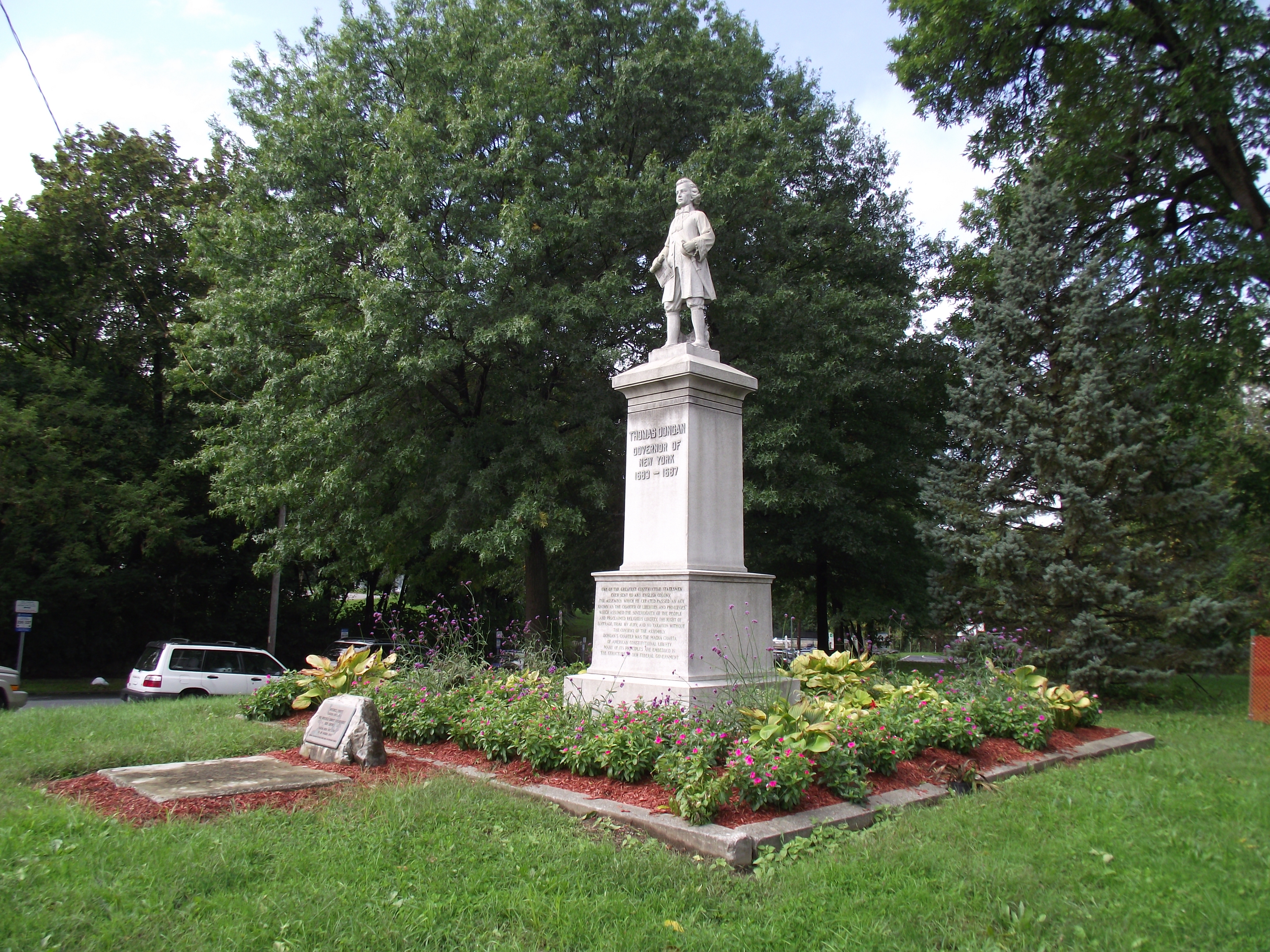
Statue of Thomas Dongan in Dongan Park adjacent to Dongan Place, Poughkeepsie, NY, dedicated June 1930 by NY Governor Franklin D. Roosevelt.

On 22 July 1686, Governor Dongan granted Albany a municipal charter, now known as the Dongan Charter. Almost identical in form to the charter awarded to New York City just three months earlier, the Albany charter was the result of negotiations conducted between royal officials and Robert Livingston the Elder and Pieter Schuyler. The charter incorporated the city of Albany, establishing a separate municipal entity in the midst of the Van Rensselaer Manor.

Dongan established the boundary lines of the province by settling disputes with Connecticut on the East, with the French Governor of Canada on the North, and with Pennsylvania on the South, thus marking out the present limits of New York State. Regarding Canada, it was necessary to secure the friendship of the Iroquois. This became the subject of a deal of correspondence between Dongan and his counterpart to the north. "...[C]ertainly our rum doth as little hurt as your brandy and in the opinion of Christians is much more wholesome." Dongan, along with Lord Howard of Effingham, Governor of Virginia, journeyed to the Iroquois nation around Albany in 1684, and convened assembly with them, garnering support, and approval. He was called "corlur" by the Iroquois Chief, a term from the Irish language "Coṁairleoir," used in Parliamentary deference to the Speaker, and meaning "advisor."

Dongan established the first post office in New York in 1686 with the objective of promoting better communication between the American colonies. In a 1687 report on the colony to the Committee on Trade in London, he also presciently described its remarkable early religious heterogeneity, which only grew across the centuries: "Here bee not many of the Church of England; few Roman Catholicks; abundance of Quakers preachers men and Women especially; Singing Quakers, Ranting Quakers; Sabbatarians Antisabbatarians; Some Anabaptists, some Independents; some Jews; in short of all sorts of opinions there are some, and the most part of none at all." Dongan opened a chapel near the site of the old United States Custom House and, after three Jesuit priests were admitted to the colony, the first Catholic Mass in the city was celebrated on 30 October 1683.

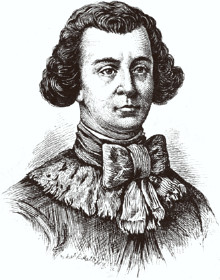
Line drawing of Thomas Dongan, 2nd Earl of Limerick

James later consolidated the colonial governments of New York, New Jersey and the United Colonies of New England into the Dominion of New England and appointed Edmund Andros, the former Governor-General of New York, as Governor-General. Dongan transferred his governorship back to Andros on 11 August 1688. He retired to his Staten Island estate, where he remained until July 1689. During Leisler's Rebellion, fearing for his safety, he fled back to England.

Dongan was to execute land grants establishing several towns throughout New York State including the eastern Long Island communities of East Hampton and Southampton. These grants, called the Dongan Patents, set up Town Trustees as the governing bodies with a mission of managing common land for common good. The Dongan Patents still hold force of law and have been upheld by the US Supreme Court with the Trustees—rather than town boards, city councils or even the State Legislature—still managing much of the common land in the state.

In 1698, his brother William Dongan, 1st Earl of Limerick, died without issue. Because of his service to the Crown as a military officer and as provincial governor, Dongan was granted his brother's title in the Peerage of Ireland and a portion of his brother's forfeited estates by a special Act of Parliament for his relief. In 1709, Lord Limerick sold his 2,300-acre property at Celbridge to William Conolly.

== Death ==
Dongan lived in London for the last years of his life and died a poor man and without direct heirs on 14 December 1715 at the age of 81. In his will, dated 1713, he wished that he be buried with expenses not to exceed £100, and bequeathed the remainder of his estate to his niece, the wife of Colonel Nugent, who later became Marshal of France. Dongan's titles became extinct upon his death. He was buried in Old St. Pancras churchyard, London.

== Legacy ==
One of the greatest constructive statesmen ever sent to any English colony. The assembly which he created passed an act known as "The Charter of Liberties and Privileges" which assumed the sovereignty of the people and proclaimed religious liberty, the right of suffrage, trial by jury and no taxation without the consent of the assembly. Dongan's charter was the Magna Charta of American constitutional liberty. Many of its principles are embedded in the structure of our federal government.

— Franklin D. Roosevelt, Inscription on a statue of Thomas Dongan in Dongan Park adjacent to Dongan Place, Poughkeepsie, NY

== Citations ==
- Ref. John Dongan of Dublin, An Elizabethan Gentleman And His Family. Baltimore; Gateway Press, 1996, pp. 141–151 reference Gov. Thomas Dongan.

== Bibliography ==
- Andrews, Charles McLean (1964). The colonial period of American history. Vol. III. New Haven: Yale University Press.
- Browne, P. W. (September 1934). "Thomas Dongan: Soldier and Statesman: Irish-Catholic Governor of New York, 1683–1688". Studies: An Irish Quarterly Review. 23 (91). Messenger Publications: 489–501. JSTOR 30079857.
- Channing, Edward (1907). Colonel Thomas Dongan, Governor of New York (PDF). American Antiquarian Society.
- Christoph, Peter R., ed. (1993). The Dongan papers : 1683–1688. Syracuse University Press.
- Driscoll, John T. (1913). Thomas Dongan. Vol. 5. The Catholic Encyclopedia, Knight Of Columbus Special Edition.
- Kammen, Michael G. (1975). Colonial New York : a history. New York: Charles Scribner Sons. ISBN 978-0-68414-3255. (Reprinted in 1996 ISBN 978-0-19510-7791
- Phelan, Thomas (December 1911). "Thomas Dongan, Catholic Colonial Governor of New York". Records of the American Catholic Historical Society of Philadelphia. 22 (4): 207–237. JSTOR 44208940.
- Phelan, Rev. Thomas (1933). Thomas Dongan, colonial governor of New York, 1683–1688. P.J. Kenedy & Sons.
- Wauchope, Piers (2004). Matthew, Henry Colin Gray; Harrison, Brian (eds.). Oxford dictionary of national biography : in association with the British Academy : from the earliest times to the year 2000. Vol. XVI. ISBN 0198613660.

Government offices
Preceded by Anthony Brockholls (acting)	Governor of the Province of New York; 1683–88	Succeeded by Francis Nicholson as Lieutenant Governor of the Dominion of New England for New York and the Jerseys
Peerage of Ireland
Preceded by William Dongan	Earl of Limerick; 1698–1715	Extinct
