= William Dongan, 1st Earl of Limerick =

Irish Jacobite solder and peer (1630–1698)

William Dongan, 1st Earl of Limerick (1630 – 1698) was an Irish Jacobite soldier and peer.

== Biography ==
Dongan was the second son of Sir John Dongan, 2nd Baronet and Mary Talbot, daughter of Sir William Talbot, 1st Baronet. His older brother, Sir Walter Dongan, 3rd Baronet, was involved in the Irish Rebellion of 1641. Dongan was declared innocent of any involvement in the rebellion and was in the service of Charles II of England during his exile in Flanders. Following the Stuart Restoration, Dongan returned to Ireland, was restored to his lands and created Viscount Dungan in the Peerage of Ireland in 1661, thereafter taking his seat in the Irish House of Lords. He succeeded Walter as baronet in February 1662. During the 1660s and 1670s, he was closely associated with the attempts of his uncle, Richard Talbot, to secure better land concessions for Irish Catholics following the Act of Settlement 1662.

Owing to the influence of his uncle, Dongan profited from the accession of James II in 1685. In January 1686 Dongan was created Earl of Limerick, also in the Peerage of Ireland, and in May of that year he was made a member of the Privy Council of Ireland. In 1689 he raised a regiment, Lord Dongan’s Dragoons, in support of James during the Williamite War in Ireland. He attended the brief Patriot Parliament summoned by James in Dublin in 1689. Following the Battle of the Boyne, Dongan fled to France in the Flight of the Wild Geese and he was attainted in 1691. His estate, amounting to 3,000 acres, was granted to Godert de Ginkel, 1st Earl of Athlone; a grant later revoked by the English Parliament. Dongan died in exile in France in 1698.

He had married Euphemia Maria, daughter of Sir Richard Chamber, in Spain. Their only son, Walter Dungan, Viscount Dungan, was killed while fighting for the Jacobites at the Battle of Boyne. Consequently, Dongan was succeeded in his titles by his younger brother, Thomas Dongan.

Peerage of Ireland
New creation	Earl of Limerick; 1686–1698	Succeeded by Thomas Dongan
New creation	Viscount Dungan; 1661–1698	Succeeded by Thomas Dongan
Baronetage of Ireland
Preceded by Walter Dongan	Baronet (of Castletown); 1662–1698	Succeeded by Thomas Dongan
