= William Pery, 4th Earl of Limerick =

British Army officer and Irish noble (1863–1929)

William Henry Edmund de Vere Sheaffe Pery, 4th Earl of Limerick, DL (16 September 1863 – 18 March 1929), styled Viscount Glentworth until 1896, was an Irish peer and British Army officer.

== Biography ==
Limerick was the only child of William Pery, 3rd Earl of Limerick by his first wife, Caroline Gray. He was educated at Eton College.

Upon leaving school, he enlisted as an officer in the army, serving with the Rifle Brigade as a lieutenant between 1884 and 1890. He later moved to the 5th Battalion, Royal Munster Fusiliers, where he was promoted to captain. He was later made an honorary major in the same regiment. Upon the death of his father in 1896, he became the Earl of Limerick. He held the office of Deputy Lieutenant for the County of Limerick.

He married May Imelda Josephine Irwin in 1890, with whom he had three children:

- Imelda Sybil Pery (10 Nov 1891 – 12 Nov 1891)
- Lady Victoria May Pery (4 May 1893 – 27 Dec 1918) m. 1914 James Cox Brady (1882–1927), of New York City, son of Anthony N. Brady.
- Captain Edmond William Claude Gerard de Vere Pery, Lord Glentworth (14 Oct 1894 – 18 May 1918)

As he was predeceased by his children, he was succeeded in his titles by his half-brother, Edmund.

Peerage of Ireland
Preceded by William Pery	Earl of Limerick; 1896–1929	Succeeded by Edmund Pery
