= Henry Echlin (judge) =

Irish barrister, judge and bibliophile

Sir Henry Echlin, 1st Baronet (1652–1725) was an Irish barrister, judge, and bibliophile. He was the first of the Echlin Baronets of Clonagh, County Kildare.

== Early life ==
He was born at Ardquin, County Down, the second son of Robert Echlin. The Echlin family had come to Ireland from Fife, Scotland, in the early seventeenth century. He was the great-grandson of Robert Echlin, who was Bishop of Down and Connor from 1612 to 1635. His mother was Mary Leslie, daughter of Henry Leslie, Bishop of Meath (died 1661) and his wife Jane Swinton; the Leslies were originally another Fife family. His father died when his children were still very young, and he seems to have left his family in some financial difficulty, although their position improved when his widow remarried Robert Ward of Killagh, County Down, who was a man of sufficient social standing to be created a baronet in 1682.

Henry's eldest brother John Echlin seems to have been a man of some substance: John's son Charles Echlin was an MP, and his daughter Rose was a grandmother of the first Earl of Bandon. Henry's younger brother was Lieutenant-General Robert Echlin (c.1657-c.1723), commander of the 6th (Inniskilling) Dragoons, and later a prominent Jacobite, who died in exile in France.

He gained useful experience in the legal system by working in the courts as a clerk while still in his teens, no doubt to supplement his income. At the same time, he attended Trinity College Dublin; he matriculated in 1667, became Scholar in 1668, and took his Master of Arts degree in 1703. He practised for some time as an attorney, then entered Lincoln's Inn in 1672 and the King's Inns in 1677.

== King's Serjeant ==
In 1683, he was appointed Third Serjeant-at-law. Since he was just over thirty and had only been in practice at the Irish Bar for six years, his appointment caused some surprise. Like most legal appointments at the time, it was largely due to the influence of James Butler, 1st Duke of Ormonde, the Lord Lieutenant of Ireland; Echlin also had the support of Sir John Temple, the Solicitor General for Ireland, who justified the appointment as follows:

He hath been seven or eight years at the Bar, and very studious and industrious in his profession, though I cannot say that either he or Mr Sprigg are yet in any great practice.

He became Second Serjeant in 1687. However, he was dismissed from office later the same year, presumably as part of the campaign by King James II to appoint as many Roman Catholics as possible to senior legal offices.

== Judge ==
At the Glorious Revolution, he took his family to England to be out of harm's way, but he returned to Ireland in 1690 and was made second Baron of the Court of Exchequer (Ireland); he was later transferred to the Court of King's Bench (Ireland), then returned to the Exchequer. He regularly attended the Irish House of Lords to advise them on legal matters; he was knighted in 1692 and sat on a commission to assess the estates of those Jacobites who had fled to France. He was required to explain to the Lords why he had asked a bishop who had asked to give unsworn evidence in court to swear an oath (which is rather ironic given the number of bishops in his own family tree). He lobbied in 1706 to become Chief Baron of the Irish Exchequer, but was passed over, supposedly on the grounds of ill health, although he was well enough to go regularly on assize in Ulster.

In 1713–4, Irish political life was greatly complicated by a feud between the Dublin Castle administration and Dublin Corporation. Echlin, along with his colleagues, signed a number of reports on the matter, which were considered to give a partisan view of the affair. Questioned years later by the Irish House of Commons on his actions, he admitted frankly that he knew little about the affair, but had signed whatever reports were placed before him for fear of losing his office if he refused.

== Last years ==
In 1714, on the death of Queen Anne, her Irish judges were removed en bloc and were in temporary disgrace (one, Anthony Upton, later committed suicide), but Echlin's reputation did not suffer permanently. Ball says that his loyalty to the House of Hanover was never seriously in question, although suspicions about his loyalty would have been natural enough from 1715 onwards, when his brother, General Robert Echlin, embittered by what he saw as the Crown's failure to reward him for his long and faithful service, fled to France and became a prominent Jacobite. The brothers do not seem to have been close, and there is no evidence that Henry, despite his increasing wealth, ever helped his brother financially.

In 1721, Henry was made a baronet. He died in 1725.

== Family ==
He married Agnes, daughter of the Reverend William Mussen, and they had three sons and a daughter. Robert, the eldest son, died long before his father in 1706. He had married Penelope Eustace, daughter and co-heiress of Sir Maurice Eustace of Harristown, County Kildare, and the title passed on Henry's death to Robert's son, Sir Robert Echlin, 2nd Baronet The younger Robert's wife Elizabeth, Lady Echlin (née Bellingham), was a well-known writer in her day. A younger son Henry was a clergyman: he was the grandfather of the fourth Baronet.

The main Echlin residence was Kenure House at Rush, County Dublin, which had once belonged to the Duke of Ormonde: only a few traces of Kenure now remain, the house having been demolished in 1978. Echlin also owned Clonagh Castle in Kildare and a townhouse at Winetavern Street, Dublin.

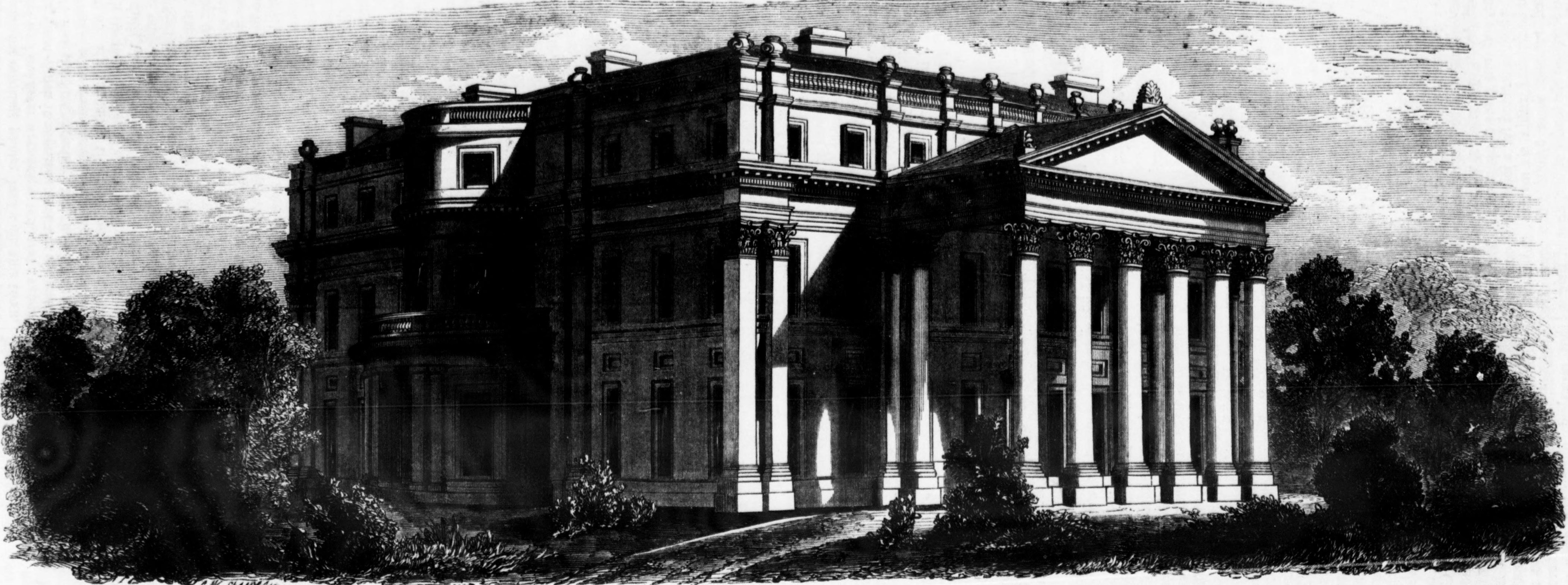
Kenure House, the Echlin family residence, largely destroyed in the 1970s

== Bibliophile ==
There is a sympathetic account of his character, which notes, in particular, his abiding passion for books, from the author and bookseller John Dunton, who met him in 1698:

"Baron Echlin is a person of great honour, and of a greatness of soul beyond most that I ever heard of. He is such a universal lover of books that very few if any shall escape him whatever their cost. He has a very large and curious library, yet is as inquisitive still after rarities as if he had none."

Baronetage of Ireland
New creation	Baronet (of Clonagh); 1721–1725	Succeeded by Robert Echlin
