= Echlin =

Echlin is a surname. Notable people with the surname include:

- Charles Echlin (1682–1754), Irish politician
- Elizabeth, Lady Echlin (c. 1704–1782), English writer
- Robert Echlin (disambiguation), multiple people
- Kim Echlin (born 1955), Canadian novelist, translator, editor, and teacher
- Echlin baronets
