= Robert Echlin (British Army officer) =

British Army officer and politician

Lieutenant-General Robert Echlin (c. 1657 – c. 1723) was an Irish officer of the British Army, who for many years commanded the 6th (Inniskilling) Dragoons. He also sat in the Irish House of Commons and the House of Commons of Great Britain. In later life, embittered by his chronic state of poverty, lack of professional advancement and failing military career, he espoused the Jacobite cause, and died in exile in France. He was the first owner of the famous Echlin Sword.

== Family ==
He was born at Ardquin, County Down, youngest son of Robert Echlin, and great-grandson of Robert Echlin, Bishop of Down and Connor from 1612 to 1635. The Echlin family came to Ireland from Fife in the early seventeenth century. His mother was Mary Leslie, daughter of Henry Leslie, Bishop of Meath and his wife Jane Swinton; the Leslies also came to Ireland from Fife. His father died shortly after Robert's birth, and seems to have left his family badly provided for, although his mother's second marriage to Sir Robert Ward, 1st of the Ward Baronets of Killagh, presumably restored the family's financial position.

Robert's elder brother Sir Henry Echlin had a successful career as a barrister and judge, ending with a term as second Baron of the Court of Exchequer (Ireland), he was created the first of the Echlin baronets in 1721, and became a substantial landowner, with his principal seat at Kenure House, Rush, County Dublin, and another residence at Clonagh Castle in County Kildare. The third brother John also prospered: he was the father of Charles Echlin MP.

== Poverty ==
Robert for a time shared in his brothers' prosperity, and acquired estates in County Monaghan, but he soon fell into difficulty and suffered years of financial embarrassment. By his own account, the blame for his financial problems lay entirely with the English Crown, which failed to pay his wages or offer him further advancement: he claimed that for many years he paid his soldiers out of his own pocket, and that he was ultimately forced to sell his estates as a result. In 1712 he sought permission to retire: by January 1713 he was pleading with the English Government for justice, as he faced "utter ruin". It is very likely that his bitterness at what he saw as the Crown's gross ingratitude for his long years of loyal service was one of the principal factors in his going over to the Jacobite cause in 1715. Whether his brother Sir Henry gave him any financial help is unclear.

Unlike Henry, he was not a barrister, but it is noteworthy that he was admitted to the King's Inns as an honorary member, an unusual but not unprecedented honour for a layman, and a tribute to his services to the Crown.

== Military service ==
He first saw active service in 1689, in the first year of the Williamite War in Ireland, and took part in the defence of Inch, County Down. When his uncle, Sir Albert Cunningham (who had married his aunt, Margaret Leslie), raised the Iniskilling Dragoons later that year Echlin was appointed Lieutenant-Colonel. He and his men fought with distinction at the Siege of Derry and at the Battle of the Boyne and were commended for their services by King William III. It is frequently said that Echlin first used the Echlin Sword at the Boyne, but the better view is that it was made around 1708.

On his uncle's death in 1691 he petitioned to be given command of the Regiment, remarking that he knew all the men and was related to all the officers, and that "it is well known that it was my industry and pains that made it a regiment". His request was granted, and he was, in time, appointed to the rank of Lieutenant General, although he complained constantly that his pay was in arrears. In 1707 the new regime in Dublin Castle dismissed him from all his offices, but he was restored to his command in 1709. The Regiment was sent to Scotland in 1708 (the Echlin Sword is thought to have been made about this time), and subsequently to the Low Countries. In 1712, apparently to rebuke Echlin for his "pretensions", the Regiment was returned to England, despite Echlin's request for it to be sent to Ireland, and it was reduced in size.

Soon after the death of Queen Anne, Echlin was summarily dismissed from command of his Regiment: by his own account, no charge was made against him other than that of being a Tory. He complained that there was "not a farthing paid to him", despite his chronic poverty, which left him unable to support his family. By now utterly disillusioned with the Government, he followed his patron, the Duke of Ormonde, to France and offered his services to the Old Pretender.

== Politics ==
He sat in the Irish House of Commons as member for Monaghan Borough 1695–1703, and in the British House of Commons as member for Sudbury 1710–1713. In politics he was a faithful ally of James Butler, 2nd Duke of Ormonde: this led to his brief dismissal from his military command in 1707. It was almost certainly at the invitation of Ormonde, who had already gone over to the Jacobite cause, that Echlin joined him in France in 1715. The Jacobite court noted with disappointment that only a handful of Ormonde's followers were prepared to make this sacrifice, and that those like Echlin who did so were mostly ruined men with nothing to lose and nothing to offer.

== Jacobite ==
During the abortive Jacobite Rising of 1715 he was sent to Scotland: after "running great hazards", he reached the Orkney Islands, seized a vessel and returned to the Continent. He spent his last years in France, living on a small pension from the Old Pretender, and by his own account waiting for any chance to prove his zeal and loyalty to his cause. A projected invasion in 1718 was aborted due to bad weather: Ormonde wrote to commiserate Echlin on the mischance but for which "we might have met in our own country". In 1719 the Pretender paid him the considerable sum of £300 "very privately".

== Marriage ==
He married Anne, daughter of Sir Francis Blundell, 3rd Baronet, and his second wife Anne Ingoldsby, in 1696: they had no children. Anne died in 1724, having outlived her husband, whose precise date of death is not recorded.

== See also ==
- Jacobitism
- 6th (Inniskilling) Dragoons
- Williamite War in Ireland

Military offices
Preceded by Sir Albert Conyngham	Colonel of Robert Echlin's Regiment of Dragoons; 1691–1715	Succeeded by The Earl of Stair
