= Robert Echlin =

Robert Echlin may refer to:

- Robert Echlin (bishop) (c. 1576–1635), Church of Ireland bishop
- Robert Echlin (British Army officer), Member of Parliament, grandson of the preceding
- Robert Echlin (1674–1706), Member of Parliament, nephew of the preceding
- Sir Robert Echlin, 2nd Baronet (1699–1757), son of the preceding
