= Henry Hall =

Henry Hall may refer to:

== Politics and government ==
- Henry Hall (MP), in 1601 MP for City of York
- Henry Charles Hall (1883–1962), Canadian politician
- Henry Clay Hall (1860–1936), attorney and member of the Interstate Commerce Commission appointed by President Wilson
- Lyall Hall (Henry Lyall Hall, 1861–1935), member of the West Australian parliament

== Entertainment ==
- Henry Hall (bandleader) (1898–1989), British bandleader
- Henry Hall (actor) (1876–1954), American actor, including in The Secret Witness
- Henry Hunter Hall (born 1997), American actor
- Henry Richard Hall (1920–1999), American actor better known as Huntz Hall

== Arts and literature ==
- Henry Hall (poet) (died 1707), English poet and composer
- Henry Robinson Hall (1859–1927), British painter
- Henry Bryan Hall (1808–1884), English stipple engraver and portrait painter

== Academia ==
- Henry Hall (physicist) (1928–2015), British physicist
- Henry Hall (Egyptologist) (1873–1930), British Egyptologist
- Henry Usher Hall (1876–1944), American anthropologist
- Henry F. Hall (1897–1971), Canadian academic administrator at Sir George Williams University

== Sports ==
- Henry Hall (cricketer, born 1810) (1810–1864), Yorkshire cricketer
- Henry Hall (Somerset cricketer) (1857–1934)
- Henry Hall (skier) (1893-1986), American ski jumper
- Henry Hall (British boxer) (1922–1979), British boxer
- Henry Hall (American boxer) (1922-2016), American boxer
- Henry Hall (footballer) (born 1945), Scottish former football player and manager
- Henry Snow Hall Jr. (1895–1987), American mountaineer and patron of the American Alpine Club

== Other ==
- Henry Hall (Covenanter) (died 1680)
- Henry Hall (lighthouse keeper) (1661–1755), English lighthouse keeper
- Henry Hall (American revolution), fought in the American Revolutionary War and began the commercial cultivation of the cranberry
- Henry Hall (farmer) (1802–1880), Australian farmer
- Henry Hall (priest) (1734–1815), archdeacon of Dorset
- Henry Seymour Hall (1835–1908), Union Army officer in the American Civil War
- Henry Hall (bishop) (died 1663), English Anglican priest in Ireland
- Henry R. Hall (1917–2012), involved in Scouting

== See also ==
- Harry Hall (disambiguation)
