= Harry Hall =

Harry Hall may refer to:

- Harry Hall (painter) (c. 1814–1882), English equestrian painter
- Harry Hall (footballer, born 1893) (1893–?), English footballer who played for Sheffield United
- Harry Hall (footballer, born 1889) (1889–?), English footballer who played for Southampton
- Harry Hall (footballer, born 1900) (1900–?), English footballer who played for Lincoln City and Darlington
- Harry Hall (Australian footballer) (1882–1967), Australian rules footballer
- Harry Hall (cyclist) (died 2007), British cycling mechanic
- Harry Hall (cricketer) (born 1970), English cricketer who played for Berkshire
- Harry Hall (botanist) (1906–1986), British born South African botanist
- Harry Hall (golfer) (born 1997), English professional golfer

== See also ==
- Harold Hall (disambiguation)
- Henry Hall (disambiguation)
