= Henry Echlin =

Henry Echlin may refer to:

- Henry Echlin (judge) (1652–1725), Irish barrister, judge, and bibliophile
- Henry Echlin (soldier) (died 1608), Scottish soldier and constable of Edinburgh Castle
