= Ward baronets =

Set index for Ward baronets

There have been five baronetcies created for persons with the surname Ward, one in the Baronetage of England, one in the Baronetage of Ireland and three in the Baronetage of the United Kingdom. One of the titles is extant.

- Ward baronets of Bixley (1660)
- Ward baronets of Killagh (1682)
- Ward baronets of Wellington (1911)
- Ward baronets of Wilbraham Place (1914)
- Ward baronets of Blyth (1929): see Sir (Albert) Lambert Ward, 1st Baronet (1875–1956)

== See also ==
- Warde baronets.
