= R128 =

R128 or R 128 may refer to:

- EBU R 128 recommendation for loudness management
- House R 128, a modernist house in Germany by architect Werner Sobek
- R128 road (Ireland), a regional road in Fingal, Ireland
