= John Bramhall =

Anglican theologian and apologist

The Right Reverend and Right Honourable John Bramhall PC (Ire)
- Archbishop of Armagh; Primate of All Ireland
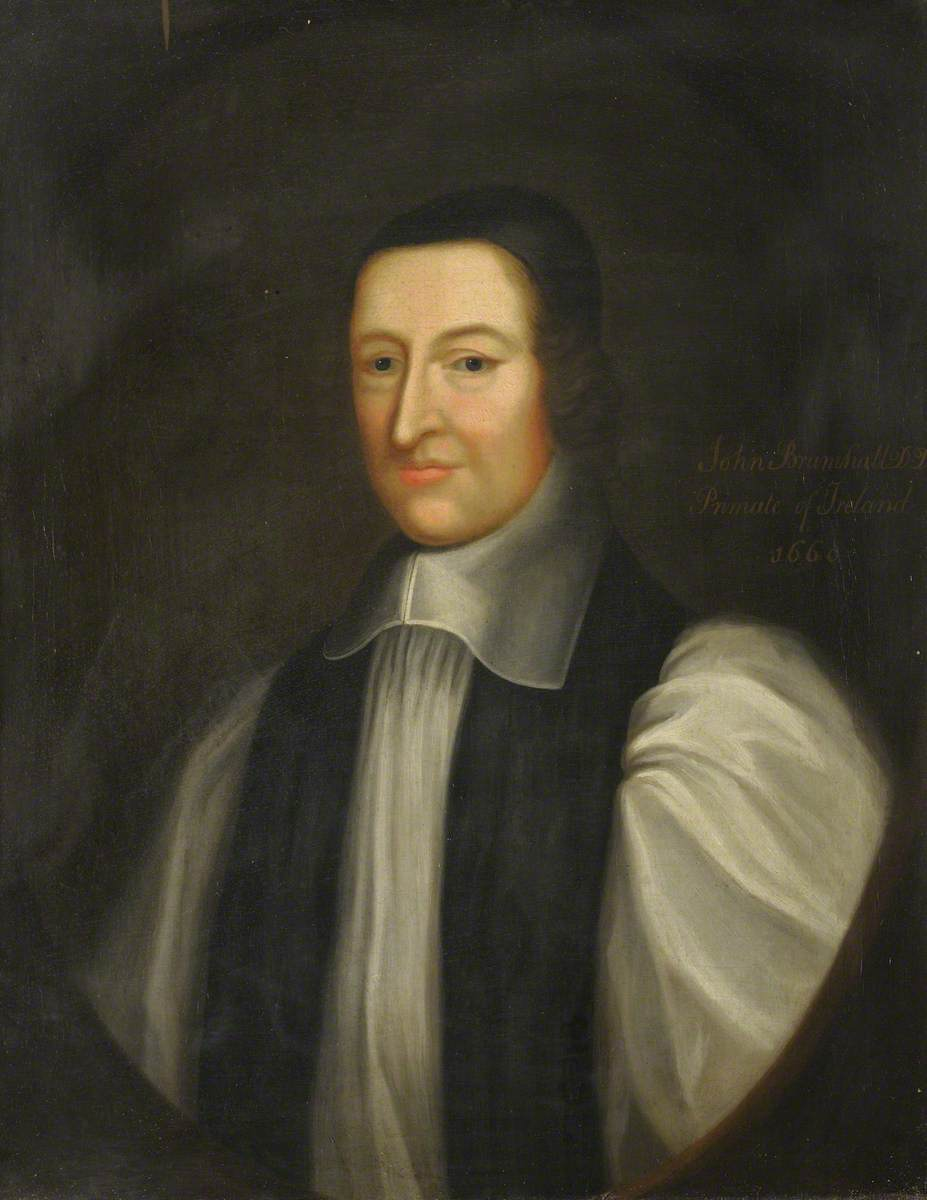
- See: Armagh
- Installed: 1661
- Term ended: 1663
- Predecessor: James Ussher
- Successor: James Margetson
- Other post: Bishop of Derry (1634–1661)

Orders
- Consecration: 16 May 1634 by James Ussher

Personal details
- Born: baptized 18 November 1594
- Died: 25 June 1663 (aged 68)
- Denomination: Church of Ireland
- Education: Sidney Sussex College, Cambridge

John Bramhall, DD (1594 – 25 June 1663) was an Archbishop of Armagh, and an Anglican theologian and apologist. He was a noted controversialist who doggedly defended the English Church from both Puritan and Roman Catholic accusations, as well as the materialism of Thomas Hobbes.

== Early life ==
Bramhall was born in Pontefract, Yorkshire, the son of Peter Bramhall (died 1635) of Carleton. He matriculated at Sidney Sussex College, Cambridge, in 1609, and graduated B.A. 1612, M.A. 1616, B.D. 1623, D.D. 1630. He was ordained around 1616 and was presented with a Yorkshire living, South Kilvington, by Christopher Wandesford. In 1623, he participated in a public discussion at Northallerton with Hungate, a Jesuit, and Houghton, a Catholic priest. Tobias Matthew, archbishop of York, made him his chaplain; he was also sub-dean of Ripon.

== In Ireland ==
He went to Ireland in 1633 with Thomas Wentworth and was archdeacon of Meath. As a royal commissioner, he worked to obtain the surrender of fee farms on episcopal and clerical revenues, recovering church income. He was consecrated bishop of Derry in the Dublin Castle chapel on 16 May 1634, succeeding the Puritan George Downham. In the Irish parliament, which met on 14 July 1634, Bramhall passed acts for preserving church property.

By the Irish convocation, which met in November 1634, the thirty-nine articles were approved, in addition to the Irish articles of 1615. What Bramhall attempted to get the English canons of 1604 adopted in Ireland; there was conflict over this matter between him and James Ussher, ending with the passing of distinct canons, in the compiling of which Bramhall had a share. The ninety-fourth canon, endorsing a policy of William Bedell, bishop of Kilmore, provided for using the bible and the prayer book in the vernacular in an Irish-speaking district; this was opposed by Bramhall. In August 1636, Bramhall at Belfast assisted Bishop Henry Leslie against the five ministers who would not subscribe to the new canons (see Edward Brice).

He employed the proceeds of his English property to purchase and improve an estate at Omagh, County Tyrone, in a Catholic area. In the same year, he was made receiver-general for the crown of all revenues from the estates of the city of London in his diocese, forfeited through non-fulfilment of conditions of the holding. In 1639, he protected and recommended to Wentworth John Corbet, minister at Bonhill, whom the Dumbarton presbytery had deposed for refusing to subscribe to the assembly's declaration against prelacy. Wentworth used Corbet as a sarcastic writer against the Scottish covenanters and nominated him to the vicarage of Templemore in the diocese of Achonry. Archibald Adair, bishop of Killala and Achonry, a Puritan, was tried as a favourer of the Scottish covenant over his views on Corbet. Adair was deposed on 18 May 1640; these proceedings alienated the Scottish settlers. The Irish Commons in October 1640 drew up a remonstrance, in which they speak of the Derry plantation as 'almost destroyed' through the policy of which Bramhall was the administrator.

After the English House of Commons had impeached Wentworth (now earl of Strafford) of high treason on 11 November 1640, the Ulster presbyterians drew up a petition to the English parliament (presented by Sir John Clotworthy about the end of April 1641), containing thirty-one charges against the Irish Anglican prelates, and asking that their exiled pastors might be reinstated. Of the Ulster bishops, Bramhall was mostly on the firing line. The Irish Commons, on the motion of Audley Mervyn and others, 4 March 1641, impeached him, with the lord chancellor, the chief justice of the common pleas, and Sir George Radcliffe, as participants in the alleged treason of Strafford. Bramhall left Derry for Dublin and took his place in the Irish House of Lords. He was imprisoned and accused of unconstitutional acts; his defence was that he had equitably sought the good of the church, and that his hands were clean. On 26 April, he wrote to Ussher in London, and through the king, Bramhall was liberated without acquittal: he returned to Derry.

== Exile ==
In 1642, he returned to England and was in Yorkshire until the battle of Marston Moor (2 July 1644); he supported the royalist cause by preaching and writing and sent his plate to the king. He hurried abroad with the Marquess of Newcastle and others, landing at Hamburg on 8 July 1644. The treaty of Uxbridge, in January 1645, excepted him, with Laud, from the proposed general pardon.

In Paris, he met Hobbes (before 1646) and argued with him on liberty and necessity. This led to controversies with Hobbes for years. Up to 1648, he was mainly in Brussels, preaching at the English embassy, and to the English merchants of Antwerp monthly. He then went back to Ireland, but not to Ulster, in 1648; at Limerick, he received in 1649 the profession of the dying James Dillon, 3rd Earl of Roscommon. While he was in Cork, the city declared for the parliament (October 1649); he had a narrow escape and returned to foreign parts. He corresponded with Montrose, disputed it, and wrote in defence of the Church of England. He went to Spain around 1650. He was excluded from the Act of Indemnity of 1652; subsequently, he occasionally adopted the pseudonym 'John Pierson' in correspondence.

== Archbishop of Armagh ==
After the Restoration, in October 1660, he returned to England. He then went to Ireland, and on 18 January 1661, he became Archbishop of Armagh. As archbishop, Bramhall was responsible for ensuring that the Acts of religious conformity were prosecuted with moderation in Ireland. On 27 January 1661, he presided at the consecration in St Patrick's Cathedral of two archbishops and ten bishops for Ireland. Bramhall was ex officio president of convocation, and on 8 May 1661, he was chosen speaker of the Irish House of Lords. Both houses erased from their records the old charges against Bramhall.

Although Parliament passed declarations requiring conformity to the episcopacy and the liturgy and ordering the burning of the Covenant, Bramhall could not carry his bills for a uniform tithe system and for extending episcopal leases. Until 1667, there was no Irish Act of Uniformity, just the old statute of 1560 on the use of Edward VI's second prayer book. The ejection of Irish nonconformists was carried out by episcopal activity, some time before the passing of the English Act of Uniformity of 1662. Armagh was not a specially Presbyterian diocese, and Bramhall used moderation.

Bramhall was defending his rights in a court of law at Omagh against Sir Audley Mervyn when a third paralytic stroke deprived him of consciousness. He died on 25 June 1663.

== Writings ==
Bramhall's historical importance lies in his writing while in exile. Without an office, he turned his hand to writing replies to all attacks on the Anglican church. In 1643, he wrote Serpent Salve, a defence of episcopacy and monarchy against the attacks of the Puritan presbyterian model and democracy. He followed this with his 1649 Fair Warning against the Scottish Discipline, which was an attack on the weaknesses of the presbyterian model and an excoriation of the Puritan religious claims. He also attacked and defended against Hobbes's Leviathan. In 1655, Bramhall wrote Vindication of True Liberty. Hobbes replied to Bramhall with Animadversions, and Bramhall replied with Castigation of Hobbes' Animadversions (with an afterpiece called "The Catching of Leviathan, the Great Whale") in 1658.

Additionally, Bramhall attempted to defend the English Church from attacks from the Roman Catholic Church. In 1653, he countered Théophile Brachet de la Milletière's restatement of the doctrine of transubstantiation with a reply that restated the justifications of the Anglican doctrine of Real Presence. He also attacked the Ultramontanists of France. Bramhall's A Just Vindication of the Church of England from the Unjust Aspersion of Criminal Schism (1654) was answered by the titular Bishop of Chalcedon, and Bramhall replied with Replication in 1656, where he prays that he might live to see the day when all Christian churches would unite again.

His works were collected by John Vesey, Dublin, 1677. They break down as

- five treatises against Catholics (including a confutation of the Nag's Head fable);
- three against sectaries;
- three against Hobbes; and
- seven unclassified defences of royalist and Anglican views.

The works were reprinted in the Library of Anglo-Catholic Theology, Oxford, 1842–5, 5 vols.

John Milton thought, mistakenly, that Bramhall wrote the Apologia pro Rege et Populo Anglicano, 1650; the real author was John Rowland. The posthumous publication of Bramhall's Vindication of himself and the Episcopal Clergy from the Presbyterian Charge of Popery, as it is managed by Mr. Baxter, &c., 1672, with a preface by Samuel Parker, produced Andrew Marvell's 'The Rehearsal Transpros'd,' 1672.

He is remembered also for the phrase It is the last feather that breaks the horse's back (Works, 1655), an early version of The last straw that breaks the camel's back.

== Family ==
His marriage to a clergyman's widow, Ellinor Halley, gave him a fortune and a library. Their children included:

- Sir Thomas Bramhall, bart., who married Elizabeth, daughter of Sir Paul Davys, and died without issue.
- Isabella married Sir James Graham, son of William Graham, 7th Earl of Menteith; her daughter, Ellinor, or Helen, married Sir Arthur Rawdon, of Moira, lineal ancestor of the Marquis of Hastings.
- Jane married Alderman Toxteith of Drogheda.
- Anne married as his second wife Sir Standish Hartstonge, 1st Baronet, one of the Barons of the Court of Exchequer (Ireland)

== Notes ==
Church of Ireland titles
Preceded by George Downham	Bishop of Derry; 1634–1661	Succeeded by George Wilde
Vacant Title last held by James Ussher to 1656	Archbishop of Armagh; 1661–1663	Succeeded by James Margetson
