= Ardgillan Castle =

Country house and demesne near Balbriggan, north of Dublin, Ireland

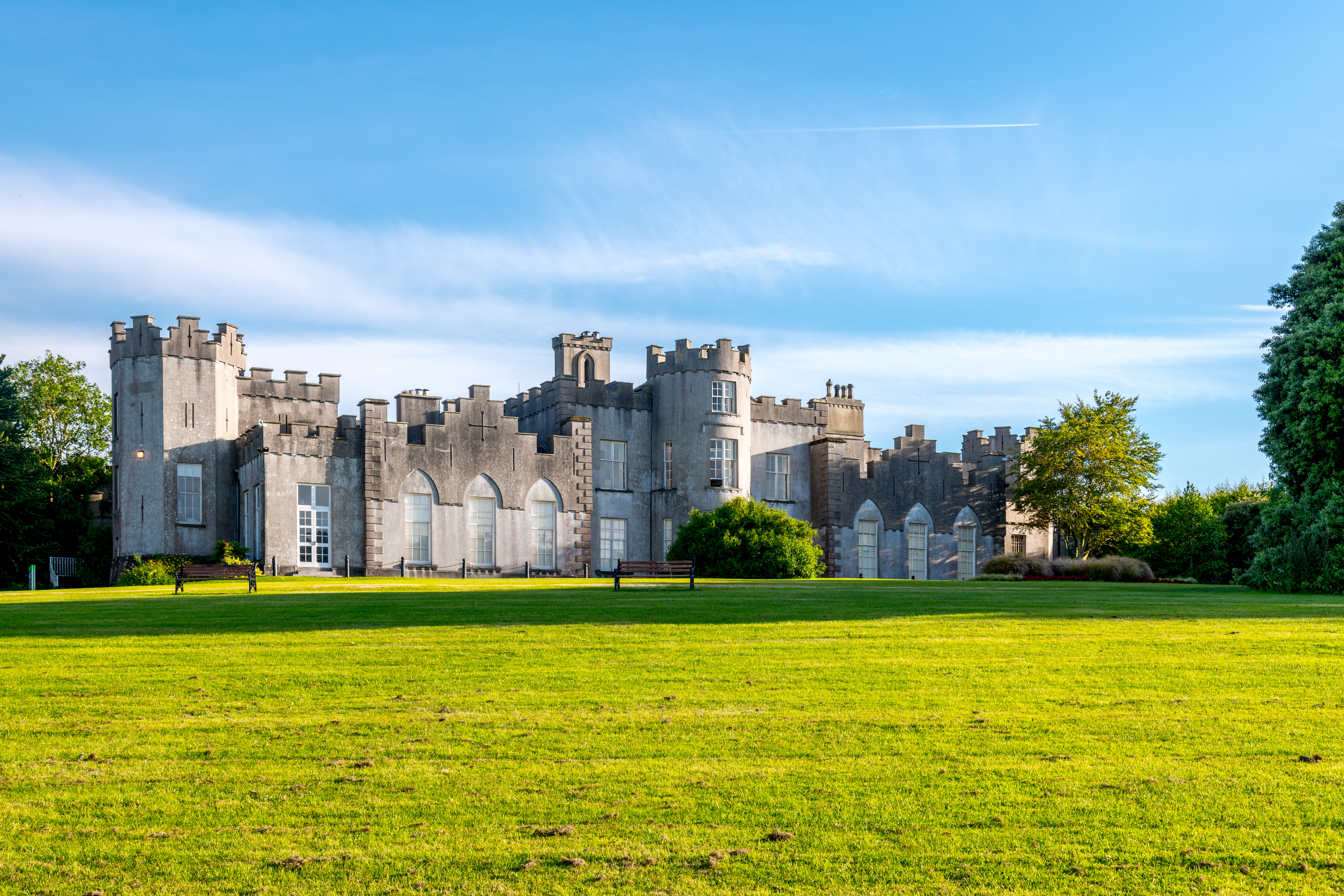
- View of Ardgillan Castle from the north
- Former names: Prospect House

General information
- Type: House
- Architectural style: Georgian, Gothic revival
- Classification: Extant
- Location: Balbriggan, Ireland
- Coordinates: 53.586465°N 6.160521°W
- Elevation: 50 m (160 ft)
- Estimated completion: 1738

Height
- Height: 30 m (98 ft)

Design and construction
- Developer: Reverend Robert Taylor (1738)

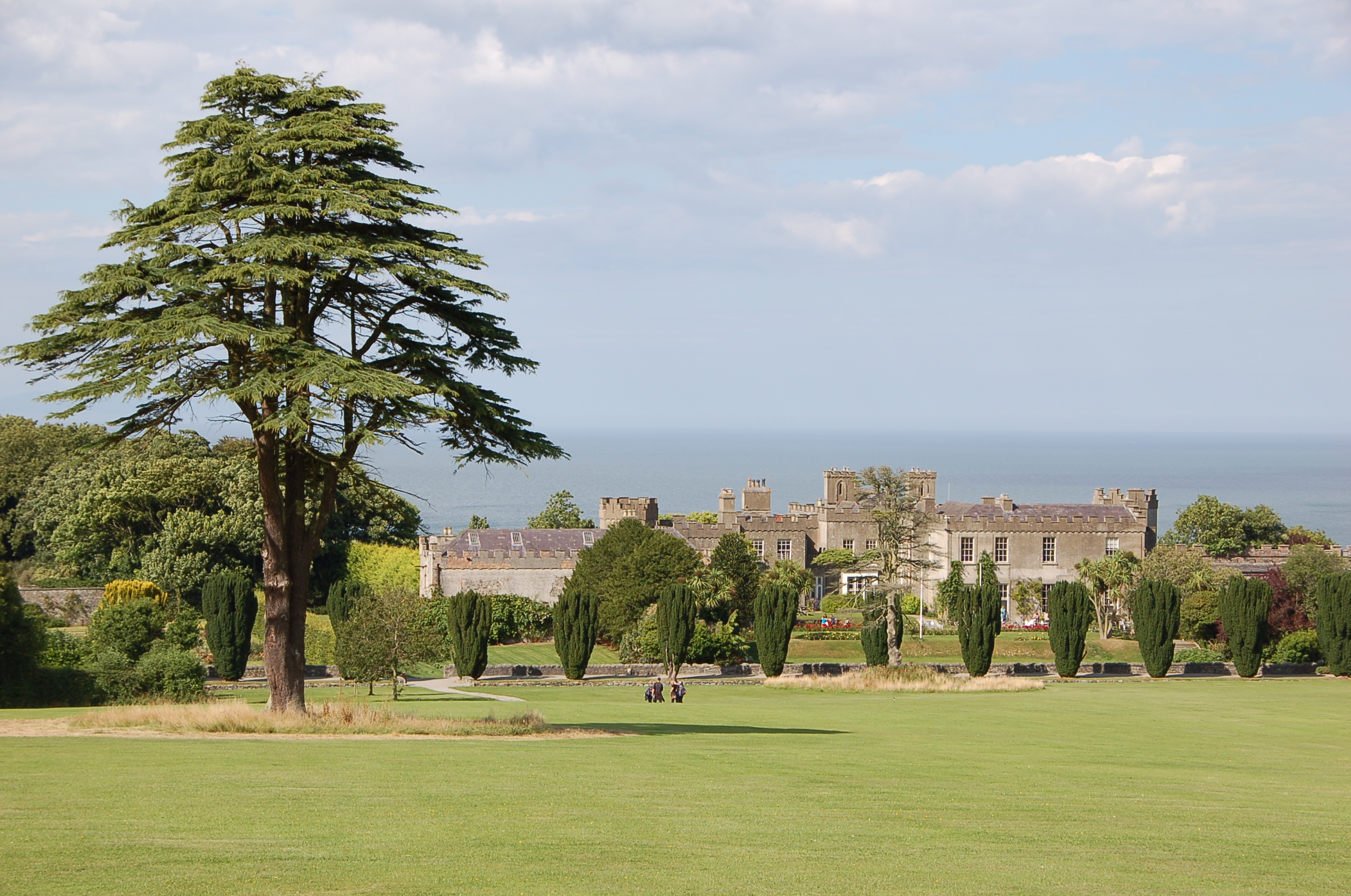
Looking down at the castle towards the Irish Sea

Ardgillan Castle is a country house near Balbriggan, County Fingal, Ireland. It is set in the 200-acre (0.81 km^{2}) Ardgillan Demesne (Irish: Ard Giolláin), a public park in the jurisdiction of Fingal County Council.

== History ==
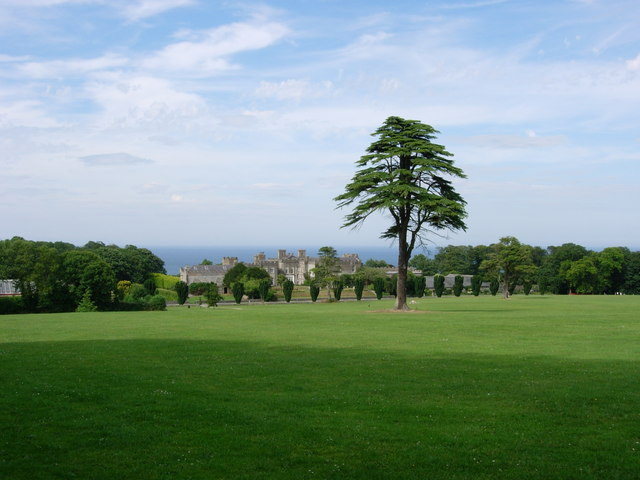
View of Ardgillan Castle looking down towards the Irish Sea

The previous owner of the land was Robert Usher, a wine merchant from Tallaght.

The house was built by the Reverend Robert Taylor son of Sir Thomas Taylor, 1st Baronet in 1738. When he bought the land it was quite a wooded area so he employed some former soldiers from Bangor, County Down and paid them 1d and a meal per day as well as bed every night. They also received a tot of Irish whiskey from Bushmills which was brought in for 2 shilling 2 pence a gallon.

It later passed down to Thomas Edward Taylor, son of Reverend Edward Taylor (1768–1852), and grandson of Thomas Taylour, 1st Earl of Bective in the 19th century.

In the 1850s, George Papworth was engaged to carry out renovations on the house including farm offices, he had earlier carried out works on nearby Kenure House. Frederick Darley was also involved in designing new stable blocks around the same time.

The house remained in the Taylor family until 1962 when the estate was sold to Henrich Potts of Westphalia.

In 1982 the estate was sold to Fingal County Council, which, with the help of Fás, renovated the house. It was officially opened to the public in 1992 by then president Mary Robinson.

== Features ==
Featuring castellated embellishments, the building overlooks Barnageera Beach, the Irish Sea and Balbriggan. The castle consists of two storeys over a basement, which extends under the south lawns. When occupied, the ground and first floors were the living accommodation while the west and east wings were servants quarters and estate offices. The basement was the service floor, the kitchen and stores. The castle has now been restored and is open to visitors.

Ardgillan Demesne is open to visitors, with a mix of woodlands and large grass open spaces. The park contains a walled herb garden, rose garden, Victorian conservatory or glasshouse, tea rooms and an ice house. A children's playground was built in 2006.

=== Facilities and activities for visitors ===
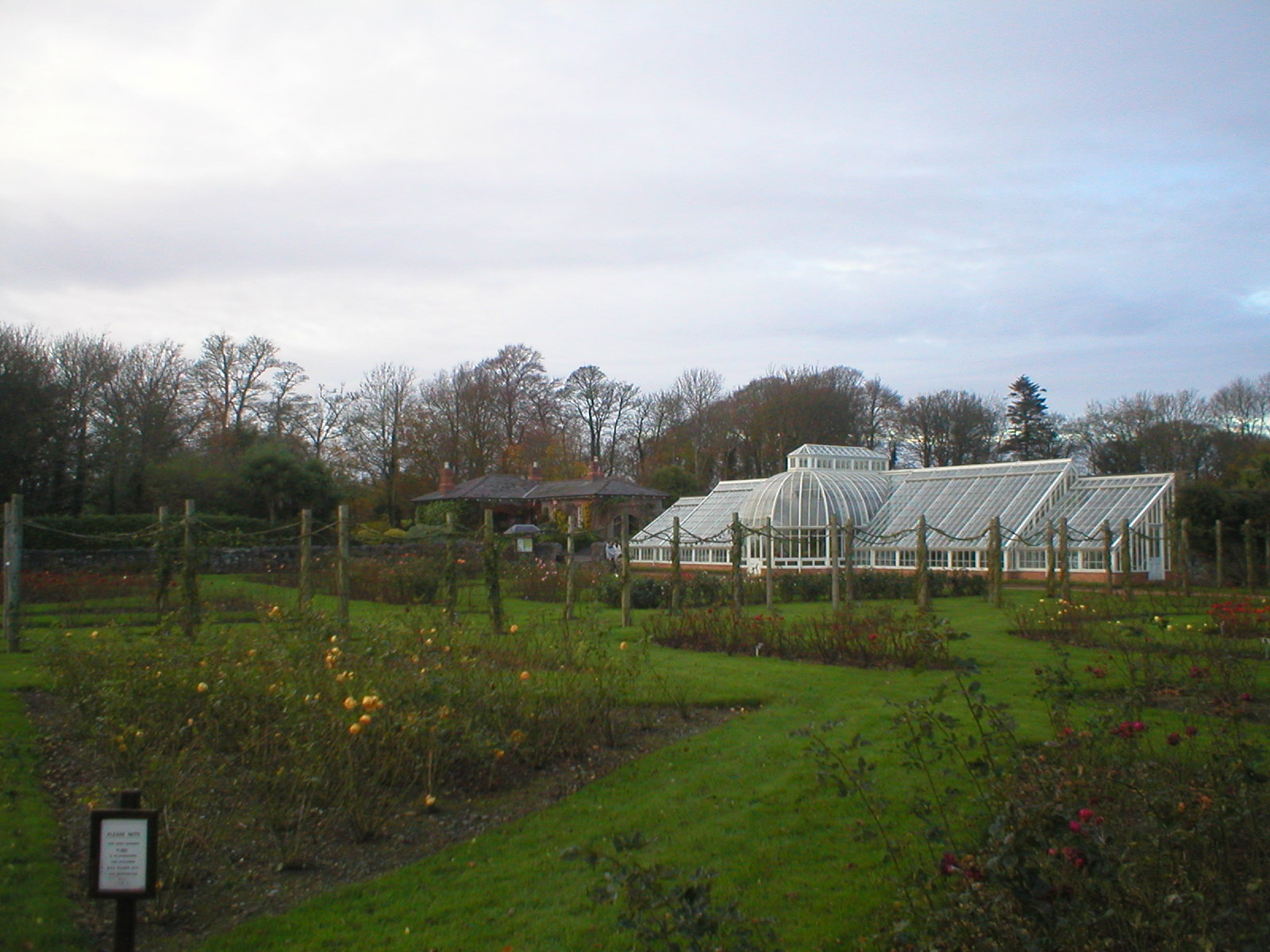
Ardgillan's Victorian glasshouses

The ground floor rooms and kitchens of the Castle are open to visitors for guided tours. Tea rooms are located off the main reception area and are open during the Castle opening times. Upstairs, the former bedrooms are used for classes and exhibitions, including a permanent exhibition of the "Down Survey" colour maps and text. Rooms are also available for small group meetings and workshops.

In 2005 the estate was host to a number of open-air concerts in the summer time. Pop artists who have played here include Moby, REM, Meat Loaf and Status Quo. No more concerts have been held at the venue since and it still remains to be seen if Fingal County Council plans to host any in the future.

=== Dog-friendly café ===
From 2016 to 2019, Paws at Ardgillan operated within the castle's gardens. Housed in the former gardener's cottage, it was "a new café that gives dog walkers the opportunity to dine with their dogs". The dog-friendly facility was one of the first in Ireland and was the first feature of its kind in a municipal park in the country. This initiative meant that dog walkers could sit with their dogs at a café table while dining. The café was not profitable and closed in 2019.

== Dublin to Belfast railway line ==
The Dublin to Belfast railway line passes the demesne, and the trains passing include the Enterprise, Dublin Commuter, Freight, and some out-of-service intercity trains.

The "Lady's Stairs" bridge links Ardgillan Demesne with the coast over the R127 (Skerries to Balbriggan) road. The bridge can be entered by concrete stairs, a short walk from the estate's car park number one and a long walk from car park number two. The bridge has high metal fencing with small holes. The railway line can also be seen from the top of the hill near the playground.

The bridge was damaged by a truck strike in 2005 and was eventually renovated and reopened in 2007.

=== Ghost of "The Lady's Stairs" ===
According to local folklore, the ghost of a woman was believed to haunt the bridge (known locally as "The Lady's Stairs") that exists over the Dublin to Belfast railway line at the end of the property near the Irish sea. It is said that the lady's husband was a frequent swimmer, and when he did not return one night, the lady went to the bridge to await his return. However, her husband had died while swimming, and she stayed at the bridge hopelessly awaiting his return until she herself died. An additional local story claims that if a person were to go to the end of the bridge at midnight on Halloween, the lady's ghost would appear and throw them to their death in the ocean.

The more accepted version of the story is that Lord Langford of Summerhill House in Co Meath brought his recently wed wife to Ardgillan Castle while he went hunting in Scotland. Against the advice of the household, she went swimming (in November) and was drowned. Lord Langford himself died a short while later. The ghost reportedly seen on the bridge is that of Lady Langford in her wedding dress, coming up to search for her husband in the Castle.

== See also ==
- Kenure House
- Turvey House
- Newbridge Demesne
- Malahide Castle
