= James Nihell =

Irish politician and Jacobite

James Nihell or Nihill (died 1747) was an Irish politician, lawyer and Jacobite.

Nihell was descended from a branch of the O'Neil family which settled in Clare and Limerick after the Siege of Kinsale. In 1689, he represented Harristown in the Patriot Parliament summoned by James II of England in 1689. He supported the Jacobite cause during the Williamite War in Ireland and his family was attainted in 1691. Nihell followed James into exile and joined him at the Stuart court at Château de Saint-Germain-en-Laye, where he became a barrister to the exiled king. He died at Saint-Germain in 1747.

Parliament of Ireland
New constituency	Harristown; 1689; With: Edmund FitzGerald	Succeeded by Sir Maurice Eustace; Robert Graydon
