= Robert Graydon (1671–1725) =

Irish politician

Robert Graydon (1671 – 1725) was an Irish politician.

Graydon sat as a Member of Parliament for Harristown in the Irish House of Commons from 1692 to 1693, and again from 1695 to 1699.

Parliament of Ireland
| Preceded by James Nihell; Edmund FitzGerald; Patriot Parliament | Member of Parliament for Harristown; 1692-1695; With: Sir Maurice Eustace (1692-1695); Francis Wemys (1695-1699) | Succeeded by Richard FitzPatrick; Robert Dixon |
