= Henry Hall (Covenanter) =

Scottish Presbyterian elder (d1680)

Henry Hall of Haughhead
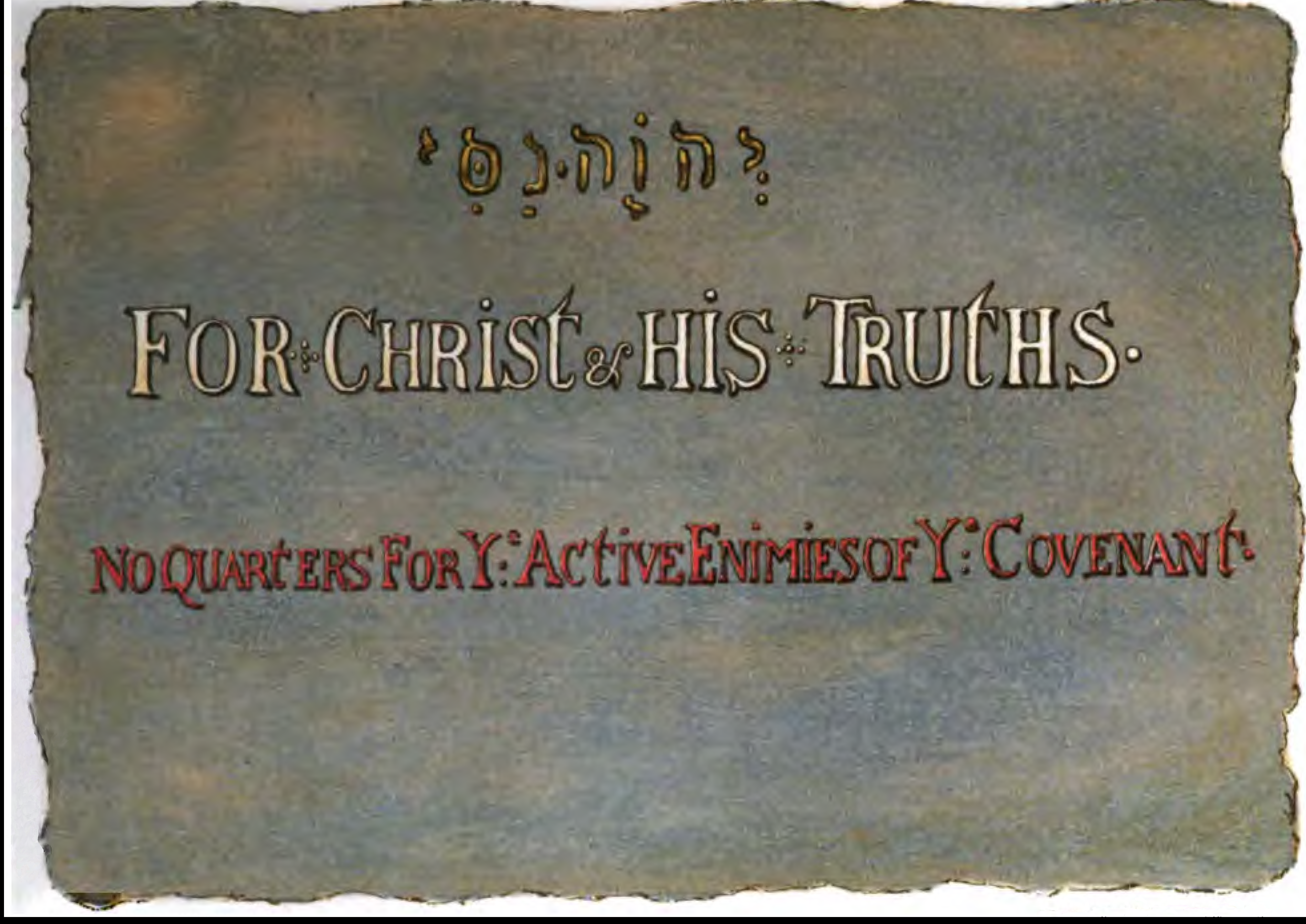
- Jehovah Nissi; For Christ & His Truths; No Quarters For The Active Enemies Of The Covenant

Personal details
- Died: 1680
- Denomination: Presbyterian

Henry Hall was a Covenanter and Church of Scotland elder. He had firm Presbyterian convictions. He tried but was prevented from joining the Pentland Rising. He fought as an officer at Drumclog and at Bothwell Bridge. He was part of a group, along with Richard Cameron and Donald Cargill, who were openly opposed to the government's religious policies. Hall was intercepted at South Queensferry where Robert Middleton, the governor of Blackness Castle, tried to arrest him along with Donald Cargill. Hall managed to hold off the governor but received a mortal headwound from the butt of a gun from a taxman after Cargill had escaped. An unsigned and probably unfinished work known as The Queensferry Paper was found on Hall which caused considerable disquiet when it was read by government supporters.

== Family background ==
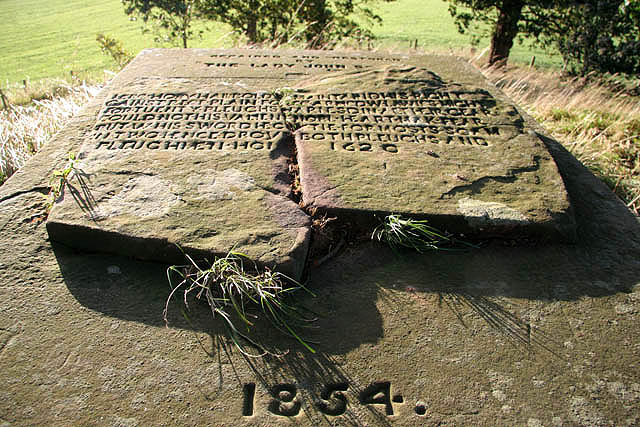
The inscribed stone at Haughhead

Henry Hall of Haughhead was a Covenanter and a landowner. He was a son of Robert (locally called Hobbie) Hall, whose name stands in an old valuation roll of 1643 as proprietor of Haughhead, on the banks of the Kale Water, in the parish of Eckford in Lower Teviotdale. The estate, now annexed to adjoining property of the Duke of Buccleuch, was then valued at £200 a year. The ruins of the dwelling-house, which was continuously occupied till the end of the eighteenth century, are still preserved. Near the house is a flat stone inscribed with verses commemorating an encounter in 1620 between 'Hobbie' Hall and some neighbours who attempted to seize the land on behalf of a powerful landowner. The family belonged to a clan long famous on the borders.

== Early life ==
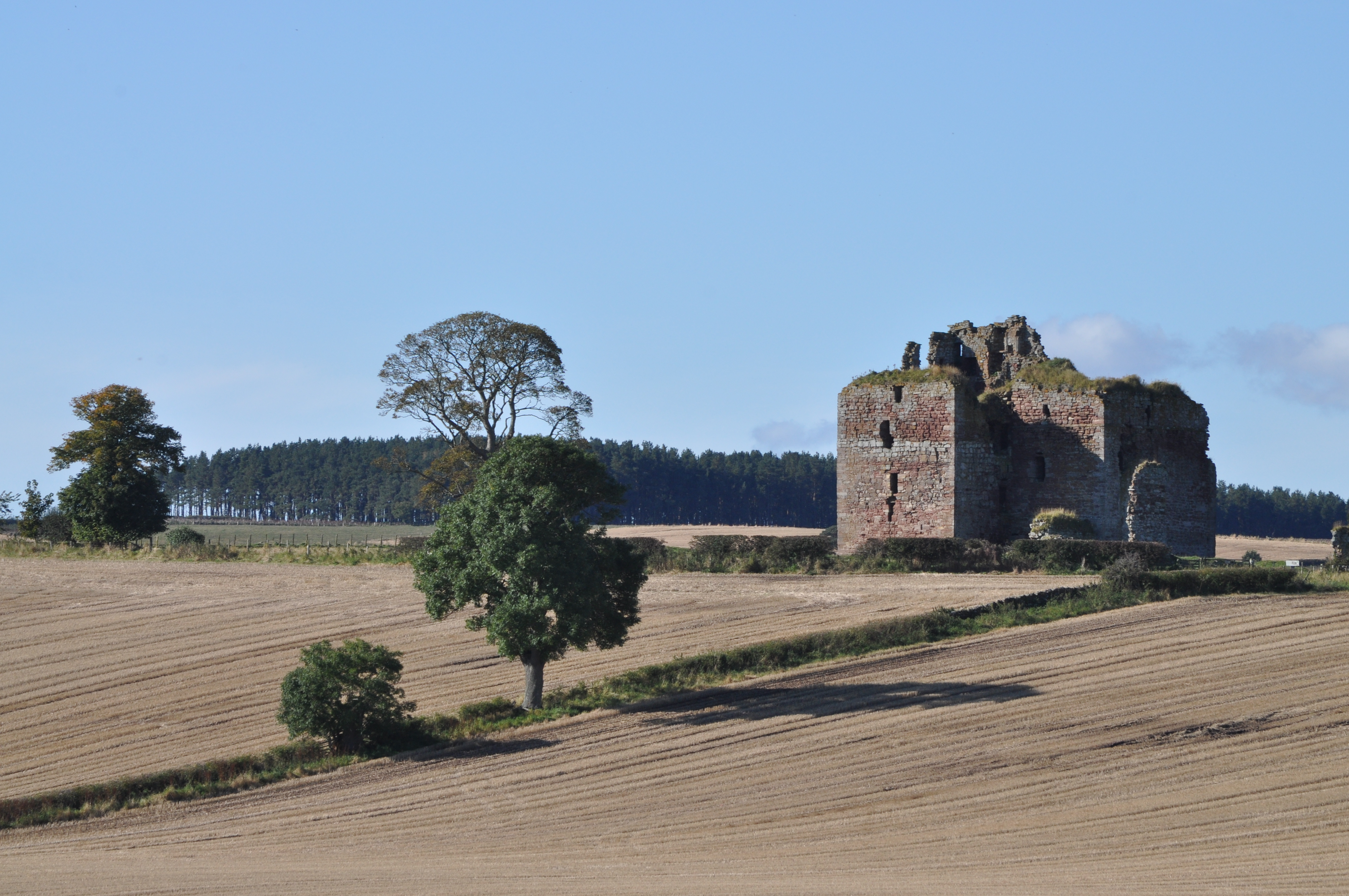
Cessford Castle ruins

The son, Henry, of strong religious temperament, actively opposed the resolutions adopted by the moderate party in the church in 1651 and ceased to attend the church at Eckford. He went each week instead to Ancrum, then under the ministry of the John Livingstone. After the restoration of episcopacy by Charles II, Hall adhered to the presbyterian preachers, and became so obnoxious to the government that in 1665 he took refuge on the English side of the border, but within an easy riding distance of his estate. He left his retreat to join the Covenanters, who were in arms at the Pentland Hills in 1666, and was arrested and imprisoned in Cessford Castle, two or three miles from his own home. The Earl of Roxburghe, to whom the castle belonged, procured his release, and Hall returned to Northumberland. There he was present at a scuffle near Crookham, at which one of his friends, Thomas Ker of Hayhope, near Yetholm, was killed. On this account he was compelled to quit the locality, and, returning to Scotland, wandered up and down, often in company with Donald Cargill and other Covenanting ministers. Conventicles, or field meetings, were held on his estate. Its seclusion and proximity to the border hills, where refuge could easily be found in case of surprise by the dragoons, admirably adapted it for this purpose. There Richard Cameron was licensed to preach the gospel.

== Political aspirations ==
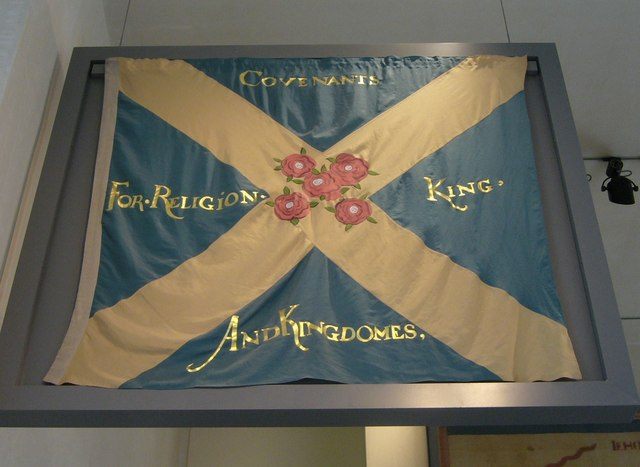
Replica Covenanter flag, Royal Scottish Museum

Hall was one of four Covenanting elders who, at a council of war at Shawhead Muir, on 18 June 1679, were appointed, with Cargill, Douglas, King, and Barclay, to draw up a statement of Causes of the Lord's wrath against the Land. He was also one of the commanding officers of the Covenanters' army from the skirmish at Drumclog till their defeat at Bothwell Bridge (June 1679). The blue silk banner carried before him in battle was in possession of a family in Moffat, Dumfriesshire. On 25 June 1679 the Scottish privy council ordered a search for Hall but he escaped to the Netherlands and returned after three months.

== Capture at Queensferry ==
Hall seems to have spent a lot of time around Bo'ness in company with Donald Cargill. News of the banned Covenanters being in the neighbourhood was given by the government sanctioned church ministers of the locality and reached Robert Middleton, the governor of Blackness Castle. On 3 June 1680, he followed them to an inn in South Queensferry. He saw them stable their horses, and reportedly came forward and claimed much respect for both, and persuaded them to have a glass of wine. When they had sat down and "had taken each a glass," Middleton threw off the mask, declared them his prisoners, and called upon the people in the house to assist; but all refused except what older writers call "a waiter," that is, an excise officer, "through whose means the governor got the gates shut till his soldiers came." The noise in the house awakened the suspicion of the women in the neighbourhood, and they broke up the outer gate. Hall held the governor until Cargill got safe away. He then got off himself, but in getting away, "Thomas George, the waiter, struck him on the head with a carabine, and gave him a mortal wound." He nevertheless managed to get out, when the women took him under their care and conveyed him out of the town. He walked a few steps, but soon fainted away. He was taken to the next country house, near Echlin, and a surgeon attended him. (One of the women who helped him was later imprisoned for 16 weeks). General Dalziel, of Pentland fame, lived near at hand, at Binns, a residence about a mile south from Blackness, and with a party of his guards came, and, though it was evident Hall was dying, carried him away prisoner to Edinburgh, and he died among their hands on the road. His body was carried to the Canongate Tolbooth, and lay there three days, when it was interred at night by his friends.

== The Queensferry paper ==
When Hall was taken, there was found upon him a paper that has been called, from the place where it was got, the Queensferry Paper. It was not acknowledged by Donald Cargill, for it does not seem to have been revised; and it was unsigned, but it is not doubted that it mainly came from his pen. The Queensferry Paper, shocked the government as the subscribers renounced allegiance to the existing king and government, and engaged to defend their rights and privileges, natural, civil, and divine. Some writers point to it as being an early proclamation of the freedom of religion and of self-defence; others point out the radical nature of the politics, foreshadowing the Sanquhar Declaration of 22 June 1680- a year to the day after the battle of Bothwell Bridge.

== Family ==
- Robert Hall was a son.
- George Hall was a grandson [born 1680, son of 1728 Robert Hall of Haughhead, and grandson of Henry Hall, the Covenanter; M.A. (Edinburgh, 26 June 1699); chaplain to Pringle of Torsonce; licen. by Presb. of Earlston 8 Aug. 1706; chaplain to Thomas, Earl of Haddington; ord. to Abbotrule 23 Sept. 1714; pres. by James Murray of Cherrytrees; trans, and adm. 24 Oct. 1728; died 30 Nov. 1740. He marr. 17 July 1716, Emily (died at Edinburgh, 1768), daugh. of Andrew Duncan, Scone, and had issue — Patrick; Gilbert; Robert, bursar of the Presb.; Jean (marr. April 1748, Colin Campbell, writer, Edinburgh). Publication — Practical Sermons on Several Subjects (Edinburgh, 1732)].
- Robert Hall (1763-1824) was a great-grandson.

== Bibliography ==
- Old Valuation Roll, 1643–78
- Howie's Scots Worthies, ed. 1870
- Records of Privy Council of Scotland
- Statistical Account of Eckford Parish, 1793
- Scott's Minstrelsy of the Scottish Border, and note
- Transactions of the Berwickshire Naturalists' Club
- personal visit and inquiries in the locality.
