= Echlin baronets =

Extinct baronetcy in the Baronetage of Ireland

The Echlin Baronetcy, of Clonagh in the County of Kildare, was a title in the Baronetage of Ireland. It was created on 17 October 1721 for Sir Henry Echlin, 2nd Baron of the Court of Exchequer (Ireland). He was the great-grandson of the Right Reverend Robert Echlin, Bishop of Down and Connor between 1613 and 1635. The title became dormant on the death of the tenth Baronet in 2007.

Three members of the family sat in the Irish House of Commons: Robert Echlin, eldest son of the first baronet and father of the second baronet; Lieutenant-General Robert Echlin, younger brother of the first baronet; and Charles Echlin, eldest son of John Echlin, the elder brother of the first baronet.

Their main residence was at Kenure House, Rush, County Dublin.

== Echlin baronets, of Clonagh (1721) ==
- Sir Henry Echlin, 1st Baronet (1652–1725)
- Sir Robert Echlin, 2nd Baronet (1699–1757); his wife Elizabeth, Lady Echlin (c.1704-1787), English writer
- Sir Henry Echlin, 3rd Baronet (1740–1799)
- Sir James Echlin, 4th Baronet (1769–1833)
- Sir Frederick Henry Echlin, 5th Baronet (1795–1871)
- Sir Ferdinand Fenton Echlin, 6th Baronet (1798–1877)
- Sir Thomas Echlin, 7th Baronet (1844– 1906)
- Sir Henry Frederick Echlin, 8th Baronet (1846–1923)
- Sir John Frederick Echlin, 9th Baronet (1890–1932)
- Sir Norman David Fenton Echlin, 10th Baronet (1925–2007)
