= Harold Hall =

Harold Hall may refer to:

- Harold Hall (footballer) (1887–?), English footballer
- Harold Hall (cricketer) (1875–1915), English cricketer
- Harold Hall (civil servant) (1913–2004), English cricketer, British Indian Army officer and civil servant
- Harold Wesley Hall (1888–1974), Australian aviator and philanthropist
  - Harold Hall Australian expeditions, 1960s ornithological expeditions sponsored by H. W. Hall
- Sonny Hall (unionist), born Harold Hall (1932–2022), American labor union leader

== See also ==
- Harry Hall (disambiguation)
