= Henry Leslie (bishop) =

Scottish bishop

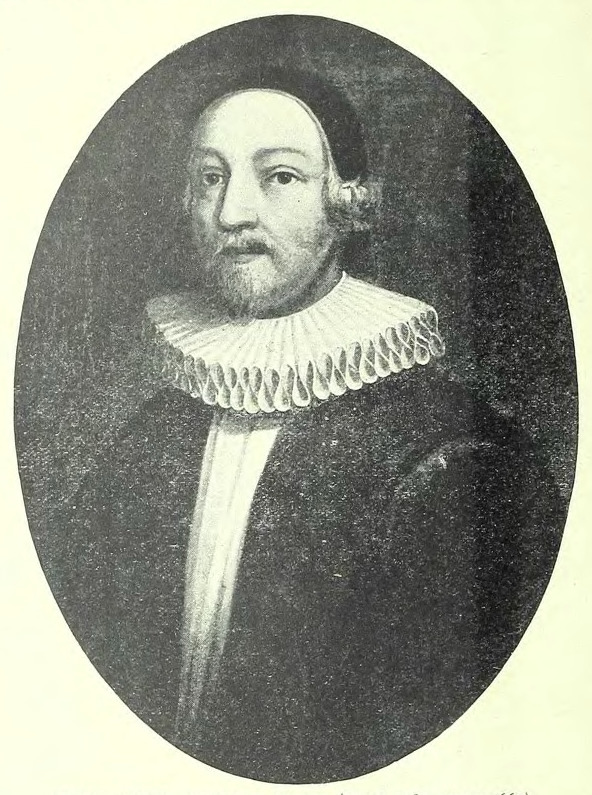
- Born: 1580; Leslie
- Died: 7 April 1661; Dublin
- Spouse: Jane Swinton
- Children: Mary Leslie, Margaret Leslie, Robert Leslie, James Leslie, William Leslie
- Parents: James Leslie (father); Jane Hamilton (mother)

Henry Leslie (1580 – 9 April 1661) was a Scotsman who became the Church of Ireland Bishop of Down and Connor from 1635 to 1661 and briefly Bishop of Meath from January to April 1661.

== Life ==
He was the eldest son of James Leslie and his wife, Jean Hamilton of Evandale, born at Leslie, Fife in 1580. The father, apparently a Catholic, was the second surviving son of George Leslie, 4th Earl of Rothes. Henry Leslie was educated at Aberdeen, and went to Ireland in 1614, where he was ordained priest on 8 April 1617. He became prebendary of Connor in 1619, and rector of Muckamore in 1622, in which year he was selected by Primate Christopher Hampton to preach at Drogheda on Whit Sunday before the royal commissioners. The sermon was printed next year at Hampton's request, as 'a treatise tending to unity'; Leslie had proposed that no one should be allowed to go beyond seas for education, and that no popish schoolmaster should be allowed at home.

Leslie did curate's duty at Drogheda from 1622 to 1626. He preached before Charles I at Windsor on 9 July 1625, and at Oxford the same year; and on 30 October, being then one of his majesty's chaplains in ordinary, he delivered 'a warning to Israel' in Christ Church, Dublin, dedicated to Lord-deputy Falkland. In 1627 Leslie again preached before the king at Woking, and in the same year, he was made Dean of Down. In 1628 he was made precentor of St Patrick's Cathedral, Dublin, three other livings being added to the dignity, and in 1632 he became treasurer also, and he seems to have held all these preferments in addition to his deanery.

Leslie was prolocutor of the Lower House of Convocation during the Irish Convocation of 1634, and came into immediate contact with Lord-deputy Wentworth. In Irish church politics, he belonged to the party of John Bramhall rather than to that of James Ussher. Leslie was consecrated bishop of Down and Connor in St. Peter's Church, Drogheda, on 4 October 1635, when he resigned his other preferments, except the prebend of Mullaghbrack in Armagh. During the six years which elapsed between the consecration and the beginning of the great rebellion, Leslie was chiefly engaged in conflicts with the presbyterian Ulster Scots, becoming a member of the high commission court in February 1636. In May he preached at Newtownards on the death of Hugh Montgomery, 1st Viscount Montgomery, and in July he held his primary visitation at Lisburn. Five ministers, including Viscount Clandeboye's nephew, James Hamilton, there refused subscription to the new canons. Urged on by Bramhall, he preached at Belfast on 10 August on the text, 'If he neglect to hear the church, let him be unto thee as an heathen man and a publican.' This sermon, in defence of Anglican orders and of kneeling at the communion, was printed in the following year as A Treatise of the Authority of the Church, and dedicated to Wentworth. Leslie says that presbyterianism made most progress among women. On the day after the sermon, a disputation took place between the bishop and Hamilton as spokesman for his brethren. The result was that the five ministers were deposed, the bishop expressing his sorrow at having to proceed so far. Leslie was now regarded as a champion of Laudian episcopacy, and works by John Corbet were attributed to him.

Developments in Scotland gave confidence to presbyterians in Ulster, and on 26 September 1638 Leslie preached at Lisburn against the solemn league and covenant; a Latin version of this sermon, entitled Examen Conjurationis Scoticae, was published by his chaplain, James Portus, in 1639. Along with his namesake, John Leslie, Leslie was one of those who signed the petition resulting in the proclamation of 1639. This imposed the "black oath", by which every Scot, of either sex and of any age over sixteen, might be made to renounce the covenant and to swear unquestioning obedience to all the king's commands. The bishop was active in the proceedings against Robert Adeir of Ballymena, who had subscribed to the covenant as a Scottish laird, and whose Irish estate was confiscated by Wentworth. Leslie found that his communications with Scotland were interrupted, and was isolated; he believed his life to be in danger. A viceregal commission giving him summary power of imprisoning those who refused to appear in his court furnished the ninth article of the impeachment of Strafford (as Wentworth had become). At the beginning of 1640, Leslie was seriously ill and was unable to attend the parliament which met on 16 March; from his sick bed, he wrote a memorandum for Strafford as to the best means of increasing the royal revenues in Ulster. In the following month, Strafford left Ireland, and the system which he had laboriously built up soon began to crumble away.

The Irish Rebellion of 1641 followed, finding Leslie on 23 October 1641 at Lisburn, writing letters to Lord Montgomery for help, as the news came in of the loss of Charlemont and Newry, and the advance of Sir Phelim O'Neill to Tanderagee. Lisburn became the main refuge of the Antrim Protestants, and fifteen hundred men assembled in and around the bishop's house. His sons James and William led royalist companies. North-east Ulster escaped O'Neill only to fall into the hands of the Covenanters, and Leslie lost everything, leaving for England.

He preached at Oxford on the Fast-day 9 February 1644, before a great many members of the House of Commons, and again on 27 March before some peers and many of the lower house. Afterwards, he joined James Butler, 1st Duke of Ormonde, in Dublin. He was one of eight Anglican prelates who, on 2 August 1645, there refused to forgo the power of the keys over Roman Catholics. Ormonde surrendered Dublin to the parliament in 1647, and Leslie went abroad either before or just after the king's execution. In June 1649 he preached at Breda on the royal martyrdom before Charles II and the Princess of Orange; in drawing an elaborate parallel between Charles I and Jesus, Leslie compared presbyterianism and independency to the two thieves between whom Christ was crucified. The sermon was printed at the Hague and translated into Dutch, and there was an English reprint the following century.

He had an Irish pension of 120l. in 1654 and 1655; the diocese of Meath was vacant, and the exiled hierarchy made attempts to keep all sees nominally filled. Leslie was in Ireland for some time before the Restoration, and preached in 1659 at Hillsborough in his own diocese. The sermon, on praying with the spirit and the understanding, was printed, and the title page describes the preacher as 'maugre all anti-Christian opposition, Bishop of Down and Connor.' There is a prefatory letter by Jeremy Taylor; the sermon itself condemns extempore prayers. He was translated to Meath in January 1661, his friend Taylor succeeding him in Down, but he died in Dublin on 9 April, and was buried in Christ Church Cathedral, Dublin.

== Family ==
Leslie married Jane Swinton of Swinton, Peebles. Their eldest son, Robert Leslie, was successively bishop of Dromore, Raphoe, and Clogher, and died 10 August 1672. James, the second son, was taken prisoner fighting for Charles II at the battle of Worcester; the third son, William, was also a royalist officer. William's grandson was the father of Theodosia Meade, Countess of Clanwilliam; and through his daughter Rose he was the great-great-grandfather of Stephen Moore, 1st Earl Mount Cashell.

His daughter Mary married firstly Robert Echlin of Ardquin and secondly Sir Robert Ward, Baronet, and was the mother of the leading judge and noted book collector Sir Henry Echlin and of Lieutenant-General Robert Echlin. Another daughter Margaret married General Sir Albert Cunningham.
