= Ten Little Indians (1965 film) =

1965 British mystery film

- UK release poster
- Directed by: George Pollock
- Screenplay by: Peter Welbeck; Peter Yeldham; Erich Kröhnke; Enrique Llovet
- Based on: And Then There Were None; 1939 novel by Agatha Christie
- Produced by: Oliver A. Unger
- Starring: Hugh O'Brian; Shirley Eaton; Fabian; Leo Genn; Stanley Holloway; Wilfrid Hyde White; Daliah Lavi; Dennis Price; Marianne Hoppe; Mario Adorf
- Cinematography: Ernest Steward
- Edited by: Peter Boita
- Music by: Malcolm Lockyer
- Production company: Tenlit Films
- Distributed by: Warner-Pathé (United Kingdom); Seven Arts Productions (United States)
- Release dates: September 1965 (Austria); 6 February 1966 (United Kingdom); 9 February 1966 (New York City)
- Running time: 91 minutes
- Country: United Kingdom
- Language: English
- Budget: $850,000
- Box office: $1,500,000 (North American rentals)

Ten Little Indians is a 1965 British crime mystery film directed by George Pollock. It is the second film version of Agatha Christie's 1939 novel. It was produced by Oliver A. Unger, with co-producer Harry Alan Towers also credited as co-writer under his pen name Peter Welbeck.

Although its background story is the same as the 1945 adaptation (And Then There Were None), with ten people invited to a remote location by a mysterious stranger, this one takes place on an isolated snowy mountain. This version is also the first adaptation of the novel to show the murders on screen. Actor Christopher Lee (uncredited) provided the pre-recorded gramophone voice of "Mr UN Owen".

== Plot ==
Ten people travel by aerial tramway to a snowbound mansion, invited there by a Mr U.N. Owen (Unknown) to spend the weekend. They discover that none of them has actually ever met Owen, including his secretary as well as a married housekeeper and cook, all hired through an agency.

Framed copies of the children's nursery rhyme "Ten Little Indians" are hung on the walls of each guest's bedroom. Dinner is served by the butler Grohmann on a tray adorned with ten little Indian figurines, as well. At exactly 9 p.m., as instructed, Grohmann switches on a hidden tape recording. A man identifying himself as Owen reveals that each of the 10 guests has a scandalous secret, their involvement in various innocent people's deaths.

One by one, the guests begin dying off. Mike Raven chokes after taking a drink and dies, and a small Indian figurine from the centrepiece tray is broken away. In the morning, the tram cable is cut, killing the cook, Mrs. Grohmann, who attempted to escape. General Mandrake conducts a search of the chalet's catacombs, splitting everyone into pairs, ultimately leading to his demise, stabbed after being led to a planted distraction (a cat). It becomes clear that their unseen killer is following the nursery rhyme. Ann Clyde, the secretary, enters into a romantic relationship with engineer Hugh Lombard as they and the others begin a deadly cat-and-mouse game, ultimately deducing that Owen is not their host but, in reality, one of them.

After falling under suspicion from the others, Grohmann attempts to make his escape down the mountain peak, Devil's Leap, ending in his death after his lifeline is severed with an axe. Ilona bitterly confesses to having driven her husband to suicide, and is later found dead in her bedroom, killed with a syringe. By now, the five remaining guests fall under distrust of one another, and alliances are formed as the generator shuts down, casting the mansion into total darkness. At dinner, each person reveals the nature of their accusations, but before Ann can attest to her crime, she separates from the group to her room, where she screams upon discovering an Indian decoy hung from the ceiling. In the confusion, Judge Cannon is found with a gunshot wound to his head.

Dr. Armstrong intimates his suspicions of Ann, which Lombard angrily rebuffs. Lombard later comes to Ann's room and confides that his real name is Charles Morley, and that the real Lombard, a friend of Morley's, had committed suicide. Sorting out Lombard's things, Morley found the invitation and decided to accept it, posing as Lombard, to see if he could throw light on why his friend killed himself. Morley gives Ann his revolver for her protection. In the morning, Blore discovers that Armstrong has vanished and the three conduct a search for him. Blore separates and goes outside, where he is crushed by a large statue of a bear. Ann and Morley discover the body of Dr. Armstrong in the snow and conclude that the killer can only be either of them. Ann pulls the revolver on Morley and shoots at him, before returning to the mansion. She goes upstairs and discovers Judge Cannon very much alive, who explains how he persuaded Dr. Armstrong to help him fake his death. He adds that he intends to poison himself, leaving Ann as the last remaining survivor, who must hang herself and fulfil the rhyme, or be punished by the law instead.

As Judge Cannon is explaining his plan, having taken a fatal dose of poison, Morley reappears, alive. As he dies, Judge Cannon realises his plan has failed, and Ann and Morley kiss in relief. They see the cat sitting with the fruit tray, with only two Indians attached.

== Cast ==
Actor/ actress	Character	Occupation	Killed	Book character
Hugh O'Brian	Hugh Lombard/Charles Morley	Engineer	Jennifer Hayes (lover)	Philip Lombard
Shirley Eaton	Ann Clyde	Secretary	Richard Barclay (sister's fiancé)	Vera Elizabeth Claythorne
Fabian	Michael "Mike" Raven	Entertainer	William and Liza Stern (car accident)	Anthony James "Tony" Marston
Leo Genn	Sir John Mandrake BC	General	Five soldiers (subordinates)	John Gordon Macarthur
Stanley Holloway	William Blore	Detective	James Landor (prison death due to perjured testimony)	William Henry Blore
Wilfrid Hyde White	Arthur Cannon	Judge	Edward Seton (defendant in a trial)	Lawrence John Wargrave
Daliah Lavi	Ilona Bergen	Actress	Mr. Bergen (husband)	Emily Caroline Brent
Dennis Price	Dr. Edward Armstrong	Doctor	Ivy Benson (patient)	Dr. Edward George Armstrong
Marianne Hoppe	Elsa Grohmann	Cook	Countess Valenstein (employer)	Ethel Rogers
Mario Adorf	Joseph Grohmann	Butler	Countess Valenstein (employer)	Thomas Rogers
Christopher Lee	Voice of "Mr. U.N. Owen" (uncredited)	N/A	N/A	Ulick Norman Owen

== Production ==
It was one of the first films Fabian made after his contract with Fox ended.

The house used in the film was Kenure House in Rush, County Dublin, Ireland. Most outdoor scenes were shot in the Zillertal in Tyrol, Austria.

The film was sold to Seven Arts for $250,000 for distribution in the US.

== Reception and reputation ==
Referring to And Then There Were None (1945), Bosley Crowther wrote in The New York Times: "It would be foolish to say this remake comes within a country mile of that former movie version, which was directed by René Clair." Crowther added: "It does have sufficient of the essence of Miss Christie's strange and creepy tale ... to make it a gripping entertainment for youthful (and unfamiliar) mystery fans".

Variety magazine commented the film "works quite a bit of suspense into the restricted action, successfully hiding identity of the tenth Indian without resorting to too many 'red herrings'".

The reviewer for Time magazine wrote:

"Properly done, this old-fashioned brand of carnage can hardly miss. The remakers of Indians fail in every impossible way. By shifting the scene from a godforsaken island to an alpine retreat, they are able to engineer a couple of spectacular deaths among the crags, but the mood of boxed-in menace is effectively destroyed."

Stuart Galbraith IV, writing for DVD Talk in 2006, described this version as "no better than workmanlike but the story is so good that it overcomes the blandness of the adaptation". It is "devoid of visual flair, quite unlike the dreamlike sweep" of the earlier version.

Filmink called Eaton "splendid, very sexy but also ambiguous... you buy that she could be a killer."

AllMovie notes that "the pacing is brisk and the twists and turns engaging." The film critic Leslie Halliwell said that this version was "a fair copy of a classic whodunnit".

== DVD ==
Ten Little Indians was released to DVD by Warner Home Video on 14 March 2006 as a Region 1 widescreen DVD and also by Warner Archive as a MOD (manufacture-on-demand) DVD.
