= James Margetson =

English-born Church of Ireland archbishop

The Right Reverend and Right Honourable James Margetson PC (Ire), D.D.
- Archbishop of Armagh; Primate of All Ireland
- Church: Church of Ireland
- Archdiocese: Armagh
- Appointed: 25 July 1663
- In office: 1663-1678
- Predecessor: John Bramhall
- Successor: Michael Boyle
- Previous post: Archbishop of Dublin (1661-1663)

Orders
- Consecration: 27 January 1661 by John Bramhall

Personal details
- Born: 1600 Drighlington, Yorkshire, England
- Died: 28 August 1678 (aged 77–78) Dublin, Ireland
- Buried: Christ Church Cathedral, Dublin
- Denomination: Anglican

James Margetson (1600 – 26 August 1678) was an English churchman, Church of Ireland Archbishop of Armagh from 1663 till 1678.

== Life ==
James Margetson was a native of Drighlington in Yorkshire. He was educated at Peterhouse, Cambridge, and returned after ordination to Yorkshire, where he attracted the notice of Thomas Wentworth, then Lord President of the North, who took him as chaplain to Ireland in 1633. He was made dean of Waterford by patent, 25 May 1635, and in October was presented by the crown to the rectory of Armagh, Cavan. He resigned from Waterford and Armagh in 1637, and in that year became rector of Galloon in Monaghan and dean of Derry. In December 1639 Margetson was made dean of Christ Church Cathedral, Dublin. No new dean of Derry was appointed until after the Restoration. It appears from the correspondence of William Laud and Strafford (as Wentworth now was) intended to restore the almost ruinous cathedral of Christ Church, but that he found neither time nor money. Margetson was prolocutor of the lower house of convocation in 1639.

When the Irish Rebellion of 1641 broke out, Margetson was distressed from the failure of income; by 1647 Dublin was in the hands of the English parliament, and the Anglican clergy were invited to use the Directory of Public Worship instead of the Book of Common Prayer; one bishop and seventeen clergymen, of whom Margetson was one, refused to hold their churches on these terms. Ormonde left Ireland on 28 August 1647, and Margetson fled to England about the same time. He suffered imprisonment at Manchester and elsewhere, but was afterwards allowed to live in London unmolested, but very poor. He was employed by royalists to dispense money among distressed supporters, in England and Wales, and William Chappell may have been one who was supported in this way.

After the Restoration, on 25 January 1661 he was made Archbishop of Dublin by patent, and was allowed to hold his old position along with the archbishopric. He was consecrated in St. Patrick's two days later, along with eleven other bishops-elect. He was also made a privy councillor.

Margetson was translated to Armagh in 1663, where he succeeded John Bramhall, who is said to have recommended him. In 1667 he succeeded Jeremy Taylor as Vice-Chancellor of the University of Dublin, and remained in office till his death. Armagh Cathedral had been burned by Sir Phelim O'Neill in 1642, and Margetson lived to see it rebuilt. Subscriptions falling far short of what was wanted, he made up the deficit himself. He also founded a free school at Drighlington. In the winter of 1677, he became disabled by jaundice, but nevertheless, he insisted on communicating publicly in the following May. He died in Dublin, on 28 August 1678, and was buried within the altar rails of Christ Church. Many resorted to his deathbed to receive his last blessing. At his funeral William Palliser spoke of his conciliatory attitude.

== Family ==
Margetson's eldest son, John, was killed at the siege of Limerick, being then a major in William III of England's army, leaving a daughter, Sarah, from whom the earls of Bessborough and Mountcashel are descended. The Earl of Charlemont is descended from Anne Margetson, the primate's only daughter.

Church of Ireland titles
| Vacant Title last held by Lancelot Bulkeley | Archbishop of Dublin; 1661–1663 | Succeeded by Michael Boyle |
