= Thompson Kirkham =

English footballer

Personal information
- Full name: Thompson Noble Kirkham
- Date of birth: 10 December 1901
- Place of birth: Felling, County Durham, England
- Date of death: q1 1986 (aged 84)
- Place of death: Gateshead, England
- Position: Outside right

Senior career*
Years	Team	Apps	(Gls)
1923–1924	Darlington	19	(0)
- * Club domestic league appearances and goals

Thompson Noble Kirkham (10 December 1901 – q1 1986) was an English footballer who played as an outside right in the Football League for Darlington.

Kirkham was the third child of Thomas Gallon Kirkham, a lighterman, and his wife Elizabeth Jane. He was born in Felling, County Durham, where the family were living at the time of the 1911 Census. Described as a local lad, Kirkham had displaced Harry Hall from the outside-right position for Darlington by December 1923, and finished the season, and his Football League career, with 19 appearances in the Third Division North and one goal. His death was registered in early 1986 in Gateshead.
