= John Corbet (theologian) =

Scottish minister

John Corbet (1603–1641) was a Scottish minister of Bonhill and anti-presbyterian author.

== Life ==
The son of William Corbet, a 'portioner' of Glasgow, John was born sometime around 1603. He graduated at the University of Glasgow in 1623, and after acting for some time as schoolmaster at Renfrew was ordained minister of Bonhill in 1637. According to Robert Baillie after some "rashness" of the presbytery of Dumbarton he was made subject to the assembly's declaration, but instead fled to Ireland.' Gilbert Burnet in his Life of Bedell states that the problem was the controversial book Lysimachus Nicanor (1640), but the chronology is that Corbet was already deposed by the assembly 16 April 1639.

Corbet had been recommended to Archibald Adair, bishop of Killala and Achonry, for a living in his gift, and, according to Baillie, the bishop declined to patronise him. He obtained the living of Killaban and Ballintubride in 1640, but during the Irish Rebellion of 1641 he was killed.

== Works ==
The full title of Lysimachus Nicanor is 'The Epistle Congratulatorie of Lysimachus Nicanor of the Societie of Jesu to the Covenanters in Scotland, wherein is paralleled our Sweet Harmony and Correspondence in Doctrine and Practice.' By Baillie it was erroneously ascribed to Henry Leslie. It was answered by Baillie in his 'Ladensium Aὐτοκατάκρισις, the Canterbvrians self-conviction, &c., with a postscript to the personat Jesuite Lysimachus Nicanor,' Amsterdam, 1640; and a metrical answer to it, ascribed to Sir William Mure, was also published in the same year under the title 'A Covnter Bvff to Lysimachus Nicanor, calling himself a Jesuite.' Previous to the appearance of Lysimachus Nicanor, Corbet had published at Dublin in 1639 The Ungirding of the Scottish Armour, or an Answer to the Informations for Defensive Armes against the King's Majestie which were drawn up at Edinburg by the common help and industrie of the three Tables of the rigid Covenanters, described by Baillie as 'one of the most venomous and bitter pamphlets against us all that could come from the hand of our most furious and enraged enemy.'
