= Kenure House =

Demolished Georgian house in Dublin, Ireland

- Ceann Iubhair
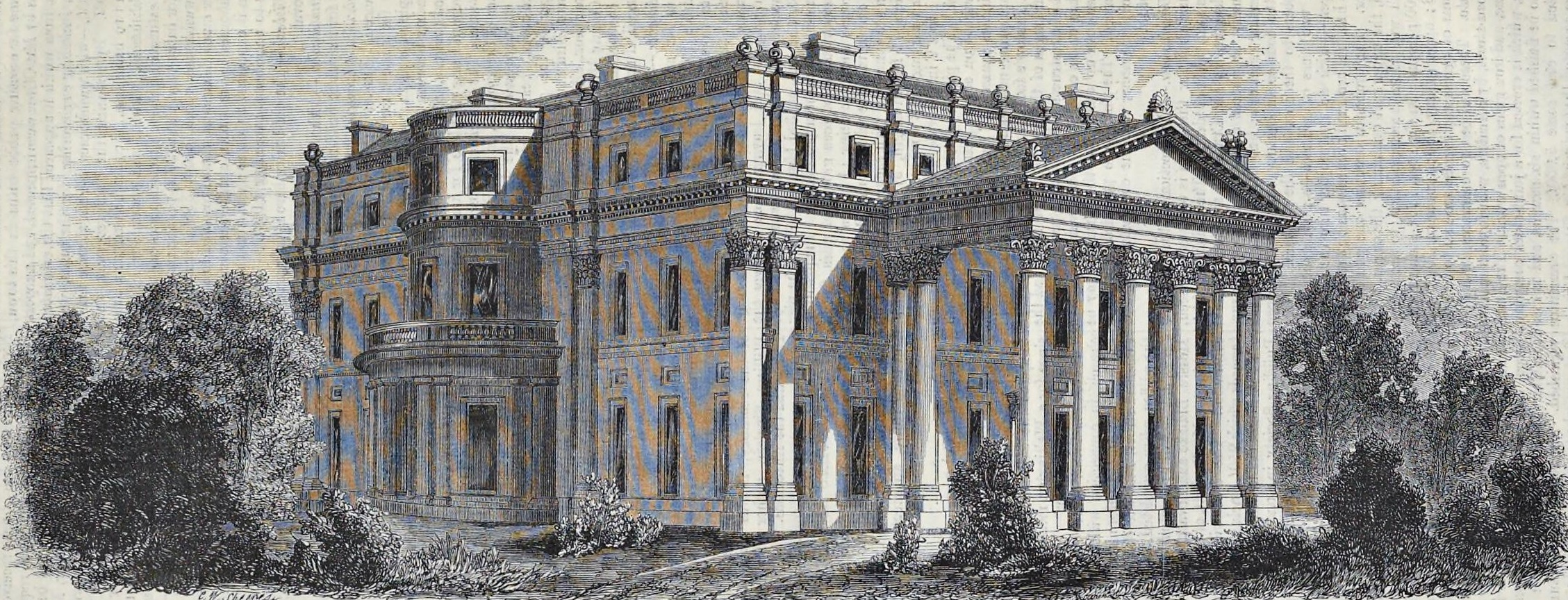

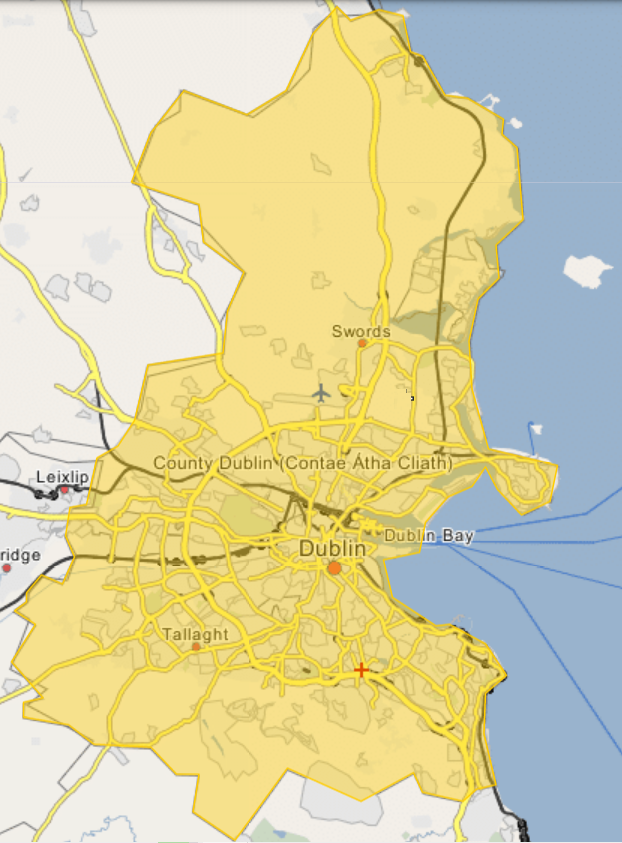
- Location within County Dublin
- Former names: Rush House

General information
- Type: House
- Architectural style: Georgian and Regency
- Location: Rush, County Dublin, Ireland
- Coordinates: 53.534769°N 6.097254°W
- Estimated completion: 1703-1713 (1st iteration), 1827 (2nd iteration)
- Renovated: 1842 (portico added)
- Demolished: 1978

Technical details
- Floor count: 3 over basement

Design and construction
- Architects: George Papworth (1840s additions and improvements)
- Developer: The Palmer and Echlin families

Kenure House (Irish: Ceann Iubhair – headland of the yew tree) was a large Georgian house and estate in Rush, County Dublin, Ireland. The main house was constructed between 1703 and 1713 by the Duke of Ormond on the grounds of an earlier house but was destroyed by fire and rebuilt around 1827. A later portico and further additions were added in 1842 to a design by George Papworth. The main house was demolished by Dublin County Council in 1978 and the granite portico is the only portion of the main house which still stands as of 2026.

== History ==
The ancient manor of Rush was held by the Butlers of Kilkenny who were later to become the Earls and Dukes of Ormonde. The family lost the estate and lands in 1641 when they took the side of the king but gained them again in 1660 when they were restored by King Charles II.

During the periods of the Earl of Ormond's exile and confiscation of lands, the Hamilton baronets resided at the house and estate. On 14 April 1668, George Hamilton, 4th Baron Hamilton of Strabane is recorded as dying at the property while Claud Hamilton, 4th Earl of Abercorn is also recorded as being born at the property in 1659.

James Butler, 2nd Duke of Ormonde inherited the house and lands in 1703 and constructed what was to be the last estate house to be built on the lands, however owing to his support of the Jacobite army he had to flee to France and his land was confiscated and vested in the crown.

Around 1714, Robert Echlin purchased the land and house which was then called Rush House and his second son Henry Echlin (1652–1725) was the first to occupy the property. His own son predeceased him and Henry was succeeded by his grandson Sir Robert Echlin, 2nd Baronet (1699–1757).

After the death of Sir Robert Echlin, 2nd Baronet (1699–1757) and Elizabeth, Lady Echlin (1704-1782), the title and house passed to his nephew Sir Henry Echlin, 3rd Baronet (1740–1799) who lost the house to gambling debts. Sir Robert's daughter Elizabeth who married Francis Palmer then took the opportunity to buy the property. The house was then owned by various members of the Palmer family.

Austin Cooper visited the house on 9 June 1783 and stated in his book An 18th Century Antiquary:

About half a mile from the (Roman Catholic) Chapel is Rush House, once the seat of the Echlin family, and which now belongs to a Mr. Palmer. It is a large quadrangular building in the old style, terminated by a hewn parapet ornamented with urns. In the front is a small pediment supported by four Tuscan pillars, which evidently appears to be a modern addition. The situation of it is low, but the view of the sea agreeable. The improvements about it are very neat and kept in good order. It is a great addition to the appearance of the country and trees and plantations about being the only thing along the shore until about Balbriggan.

In 1964, Colonel R H Fenwick-Palmer, the last of the line, sold the house and lands to the Irish Land Commission.

The house was allowed to further deteriorate by Dublin County Council and was demolished in 1978.

As of 2022, some of the grounds form a public park and pitches including Kenure cricket ground while much of the rest of the original estate is now housing and agricultural land.

== House contents ==
The contents of the house were sold in an auction of more than 1,200 lots by J.H. North & Co. Ltd. from 21-24 September 1964 grossing more than £250,000. Among the items were many pieces inherited from other Palmer family properties such as Castle Lacken, Ballycastle, County Mayo.

Notable items sold included;

- Marble statuary of a Penitent Magdalene and The Three Graces in the manner of Antonio Canova. The Penitent Magdalene was acquired by the Greville Arms Hotel where it is on display.
- William III salver, London circa 1696
- Queen Anne plain cylindrical tankard and cover by James Gibbon, London, 1704
- 50 pieces of table silver by John Pittar, Dublin, 1787
- Paintings included works by or of the school of Romney, Kneller, Cuyp, Guercino, Philips Wouwerman, Bartholomeus van der Helst and Adriaen van de Velde
- A pair of carved gilt torcheres comprising a pair of Chinese gilt figures supporting trays on carved tripod bases with paw feet and probably by Thomas Chippendale
- A George II parcel-gilt padouk cabinet-on-stand attributed to Thomas Chippendale (1755-60). The piece later fetched GBP £2,729,250 at auction in 2008.

== Film location ==
The house had been used for some years by a film production company, which made films there including Ten Little Indians, Jules Verne's Rocket to the Moon (in which the house appears as "the stately home of The Duke of Barset"), and The Face of Fu Manchu.

In 1965, during the filming of The Spy Who Came in from the Cold , a member of the film crew found a Bronze Age bowl, still containing cremated human remains, on a mantelpiece in the house: it is now in the National Museum of Ireland.

== See also ==
- Ardgillan Castle
- Newbridge Estate
- Santry Court
- Turvey House
