= Maurice Eustace (Harristown MP) =

Anglo-Irish politician

Sir Maurice Eustace (1637 – 13 April 1703) was an Anglo-Irish politician.

== Biography ==
Eustace was the nephew of Lord Chancellor Sir Maurice Eustace and a cousin of Sir Maurice Eustace, Baronet. His parents were William Eustace of Castlemartin, the Lord Chancellor's younger brother, and Anne Netterville, daughter of Sir Robert Netterville of County Meath. As the Lord Chancellor had no legitimate children William and his brother were the legal heirs to his great fortune, but the Chancellor had two natural children for whom he had promised to provide. Eventually the Chancellor made a will by which William inherited the great bulk of the property including the estate of Harristown, County Kildare, and the Eustace townhouse, Damask, on present-day Eustace Street in central Dublin.

He sat in the Irish House of Commons as a Member of Parliament for Knocktopher between 1664 and 1666. He then represented Harristown from 1692 until December 1695 when he was expelled from the Commons for non-attendance. Thereafter he lived abroad for a time. He was a made a Knight Bachelor.

He married, firstly, Anne Colville, daughter of the prominent landowner and statesman Sir Robert Colville of Newtownards and his first wife Penelope Rawdon, and secondly Clotilda Parsons, daughter of Michael Parsons of Tomduff, County Wexford. He had eight children but only three daughters survived him, Anne, Penelope and Clotilda, each of whom inherited a share of his estate. Anne married Benjamin Chetwood MP. Penelope married first Robert Echlin MP, and secondly Edward Stratford (father through his first wife of John Stratford, 1st Earl of Aldborough). Clotilda, "a most clever and excellent lady" married the poet and civil servant Thomas Tickell: they were the grandparents of the playwright and satirist Richard Tickell.

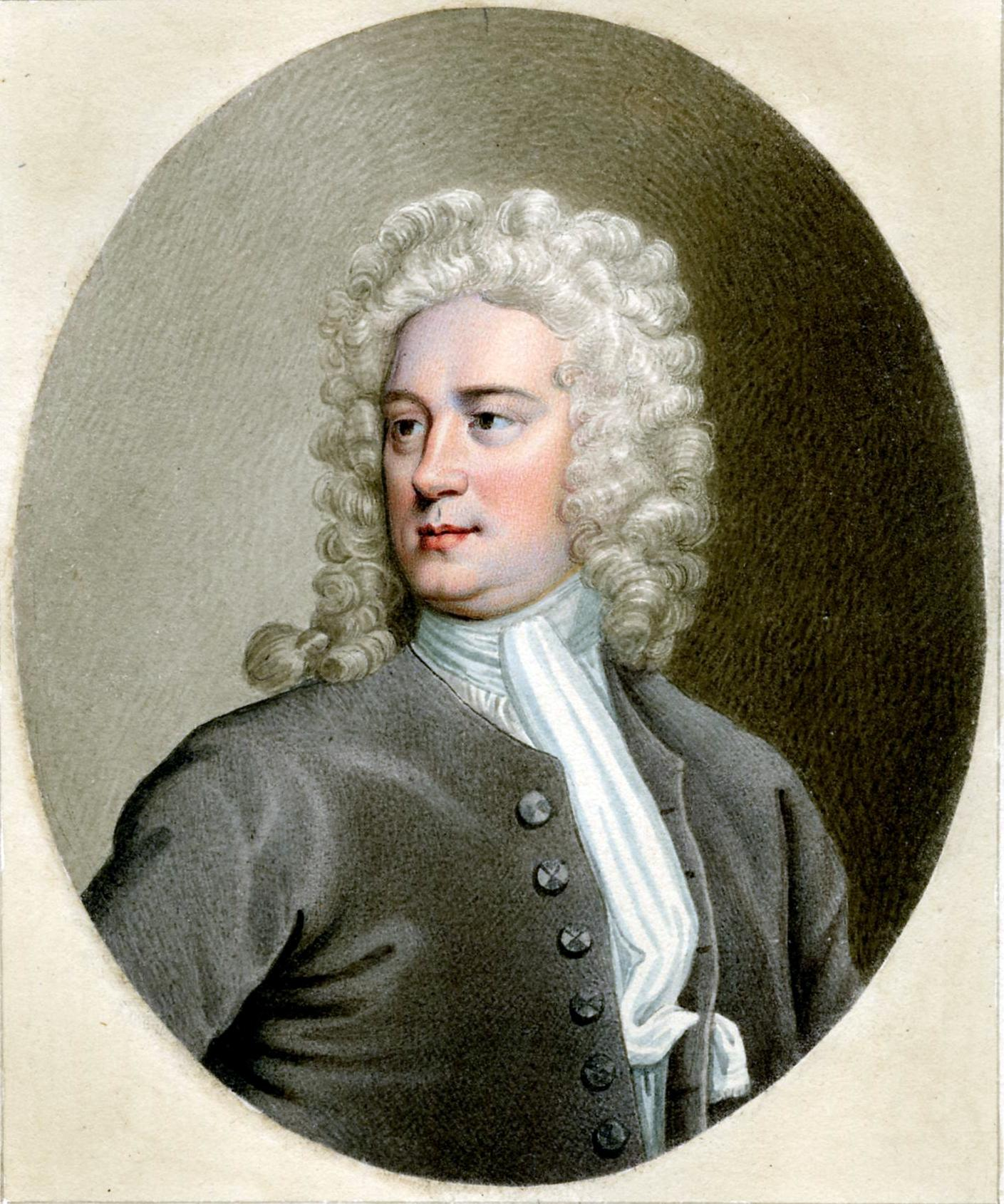
Thomas Tickell, who married Sir Maurice's youngest daughter Clotilda

Parliament of Ireland
| Preceded by James Nihell; Edmund FitzGerald; Patriot Parliament | Member of Parliament for Harristown; 1692–1695; With: Francis Wemys; Robert Graydon | Succeeded by Francis Wemys; Robert Graydon |
