= George Papworth =

British architect (1781–1855)

George Papworth (1781–1855) was a British architect who practised mainly in Ireland during the nineteenth century.

== Early life and career ==
Papworth was born in London in 1781 and was the third son of the English stuccoist John Papworth (1750–1799). In 1799 he became the pupil of his elder brother, the architect John Buonarotti Papworth, and acted as his clerk of works until 1804.

== Life and work in Ireland ==
He moved to Ireland in 1806 and took charge of the Circular Stone Manufacturers of North Strand, Dublin. He also started to build up an architectural practice. He was architect to the Dublin and Drogheda Railway and to the Royal Bank. He was later appointed Professor of Architecture by the Royal Hibernian Academy.

He was buried in Mount Jerome Cemetery. His sons carried on the family tradition.

== Work ==
The dome of St Mary's Pro-Cathedral, Dublin

The cast-iron bridge at Oak Park c. 1817 is one of Papworth's earliest works. Other work followed including the Dublin Library in D'Olier Street, Dublin (1818–1820) and the single span cast-iron King's Bridge which was built to commemorate the visit of George IV to Ireland (now Seán Heuston Bridge). The foundation stone for this bridge was laid in 1827. Papworth is also responsible for the Malahide Railway Station, Whitefriar Street Carmelite Church, Middleton Park House in Westmeath, and St Mary's Pro-Cathedral in Dublin. He also added the portico to Kenure House in Rush, County Dublin in about 1840; the portico is still standing but the rest of the house was demolished in 1978. He designed some of the most impressive monuments in Mount Jerome Cemetery, including the Drummond Memorial.
