= Ward baronets of Killagh (1682) =

The Ward baronetcy, of Killagh or Killogh in the County of Down, was created in the Baronetage of Ireland on 9 December 1682 for Robert Ward. The title became extinct on his death in 1691.

== Ward baronets, of Killagh (1682) ==
- Sir Robert Ward, 1st Baronet (c.1610–1691)

He was the son of Nicholas Ward, Surveyor General of the Ordnance in Ireland; he married, before 1661, Mary Leslie, daughter of Henry Leslie. He was High Sheriff of County Down in 1661 and 1667; and was knighted about 1670. In 1663 Daniel O'Neill made an effort to appoint a Robert Ward as postmaster for Ireland. The manor of Killough on the Lecale peninsula was granted to Sir Robert Ward in 1671.

Ward's only son Charles married Catherine Temple, daughter of Sir John Temple, but predeceased his father.
