= Harry Hall (footballer, born 1900) =

English footballer

Personal information
- Full name: Harry Hall
- Date of birth: 4 May 1897
- Place of birth: Southwell, Nottinghamshire, England
- Date of death: 23 June 1924 (aged 27)
- Place of death: Beeston, Nottinghamshire, England
- Height: 5 ft 8 in (1.73 m)
- Position: Outside right

Senior career*
Years	Team	Apps	(Gls)
- Pinxton
1921–1922	Lincoln City	19	(0)
1923	Darlington	13	(1)
- * Club domestic league appearances and goals

Harry Hall (4 May 1897 – 23 June 1924) was an English footballer who played as an outside right in the Football League for Lincoln City and Darlington.

Hall was born in 1897 in Southwell, Nottinghamshire, son of Charley Hall and Harriet Ann (née Kemp).

In the 1920–21 season, Hall played for Pinxton in the Derbyshire Senior League. Towards the end of the season, he joined Midland League club Lincoln City on trial. Having produced a good performance for the club's reserves, he made his senior debut on 30 April 1921 against Rotherham County. His corner led to Lincoln's opening goal in a 2–1 win that confirmed the club as champions, he was signed up for the season to come, and played in the remaining two matches of the Midland League season.

Lincoln were elected to the Third Division North, newly formed for 1921–22, and Hall made 16 appearances that season. He then signed for Third Division runners-up Darlington. He played in the first half of the campaign, but by December had lost his place to Thompson Kirkham, and finished the season with one goal from 13 league appearances.

Hall died of tuberculosis in 1924 at his parents' home in Beeston, Nottinghamshire. His only child, Frank, also succumbed to tuberculosis in 1927, and they are buried in the same unmarked grave in Beeston Cemetery.
