= Ward baronets of Wilbraham Place (1914) =

Escutcheon of the Ward baronets of Wilbraham Place

The Ward baronetcy, of Wilbraham Place in Chelsea was created in the Baronetage of the United Kingdom on 20 January 1914 for the soldier Edward Ward. The title became extinct on the death of the 3rd Baronet in 1973.

== Ward baronets, of Wilbraham Place (1914) ==
- Sir Edward Willis Duncan Ward, 1st Baronet (1853–1928)
- Sir Edward Simons Ward, 2nd Baronet (1882–1930)
- Sir Melvill Willis Ward, 3rd Baronet (1885–1973)
