= Ward baronets of Bixley (1660) =

Escutcheon of the Ward baronets of Bixley

The Ward baronetcy, of Bixley in the County of Norfolk, was created in the Baronetage of England on 19 December 1660 for Edward Ward, Sheriff of Norfolk. He had a Cromwellian knighthood from his period as Sheriff.

The title became extinct on the death of the 8th Baronet c.1770.

== Ward baronets, of Bixley (1660) ==
- Sir Edward Ward, 1st Baronet (c. 1618–1684)
- Sir Edward Ward, 2nd Baronet (c.1641–1686)
- Sir Thomas Ward, 3rd Baronet (died 1692)
- Sir Edward Ward, 4th Baronet (died 1719)
- Sir Edward Ward, 5th Baronet (died 1737)
- Sir Edward Ward, 6th Baronet (1721–1742)
- Sir Randall Ward, 7th Baronet (died 1762)
- Sir Edward Ward, 8th Baronet (died c.1770), died childless.

== Extended family ==
The 1st Baronet's father Thomas Ward was a first cousin of Humble Ward, 1st Baron Ward. The blazon of the baronetcy coincides with that of the barony.
