= Elizabeth, Lady Echlin =

English writer, lived at Rush House, Dublin

Elizabeth Echlin Lady Echlin
- Born: Elizabeth Bellingham; 1704
- Died: 1782 (aged 77–78); Haigh Hall
- Resting place: All Saints' Church, Wigan
- Spouse: Sir Robert Echlin, 2nd Baronet
- Children: Elizabeth Echlin

Elizabeth, Lady Echlin (née Bellingham; c. 1704 – 1782) was an English writer, best known for her correspondence with Samuel Richardson, and for writing an alternative and less shocking ending to his novel Clarissa.

== Personal life ==
She was born Elizabeth Bellingham, daughter of William Bellingham and Elizabeth, née Spencer, and was baptised on 6 March 1704 at Rufford, Lancashire. She and her sister Dorothy were her father's co-heirs and they shared their childhood home with Elizabeth Hesketh who was their half-sister. Her father's family home been Levens Hall in Westmoreland until this was sold in 1688 as a resultant of spending by her paternal uncle, Alan.

She married Sir Robert Echlin, 2nd Baronet (1699–1757), an Irishman of Scottish descent, in 1727, and they lived at his family home, Rush House, Dublin, near the small coastal town of Rush, County Dublin. The house had been built for the Ormond family; it passed to the Palmer family when Lady Echlin's daughter, also Elizabeth, married Francis Palmer, and burned down in 1827, to be rebuilt as the grand Kenure House, of which only the portico still stands.

Echlin's entry in the Oxford Dictionary of National Biography (written in 2004) records that a shell grotto she constructed in 1755–56, adorned with verses specially written by Richardson, was marked on a 1759 map of Dublin and "has recently been discovered in use as a cattle pen", but no other information on this has been found.

Sir Robert died in 1757, and in 1759 Lady Echlin returned to England. She died in 1782 while living in a house on the Haigh Hall estate of her sister Dorothy, Lady Bradshaigh, who had married Sir Roger Bradshaigh, 4th Baronet (c. 1710 – c. 1779). She was buried on 9 July 1782 in the Bradshaigh family vault in All Saints' Church, Wigan.

== Writings ==
Echlin corresponded with Samuel Richardson for eight years: their correspondence was published in 1804 as part of a collection of Richardson's correspondence assembled by Anna Laetitia Barbauld.

Echlin wrote an alternative ending to Richardson's Clarissa because she felt that his tale "serve[d] only to agitate good minds" and was "horribly shocking to humanity". Her sister, Lady Bradshaigh, had previously written an alternative ending in which "the rape fails, Clarissa recovers to lead a single life, and Lovelace, wounded by James, becomes 'a cripple, & a sincere penitent'".

In Echlin's alternative ending "the rape is removed, Clarissa dies of grief, while Lovelace, reformed by her example, dies a penitent and 'will forever rejoyce in that immortal state where smiling Angels – Exult with joy at the conversation [sic] of a sinner'". Echlin described her ending as "a jumble of ill-connected thoughts … badly told", and she did not send it to Richardson until six years after the final instalment of the novel had appeared. It was not published until 1982, in a text edited by Dimiter Daphinoff in the series Schweizer anglistische Arbeiten (Swiss English Studies Works) (Francke Verlag: ISBN 9783772015496). An edition by Peter Sabor is included in Cambridge University Press's complete edition of Richardson's works and correspondence (2016: ISBN 978-0-521-83067-6).

== Published material ==
- "Correspondence with Lady Echlin". The correspondence of Samuel Richardson ... selected from the original manuscripts bequeathed by him to his family; to which are prefixed a biographical account of that author and observations on his writings by Anna Laetitia Barbauld. Vol. 5. London: Printed for R. Phillips. 1804. pp. 1–104. Full text online at HathiTrust
- Sabor, Peter (2016). "Appendix 3: Lady Echlin's alternative ending for Clarissa". Richardson's correspondence with Lady Braidshaigh and Lady Echlin. The Cambridge edition of the works and correspondence of Samuel Richardson. Vol. III. Cambridge UP. pp. 983–1089. ISBN 978-0-521-83067-6.
