= Henry Seymour Hall =

American Civil War Medal of Honor recipient (1835-1908)

Hiram S. Hall
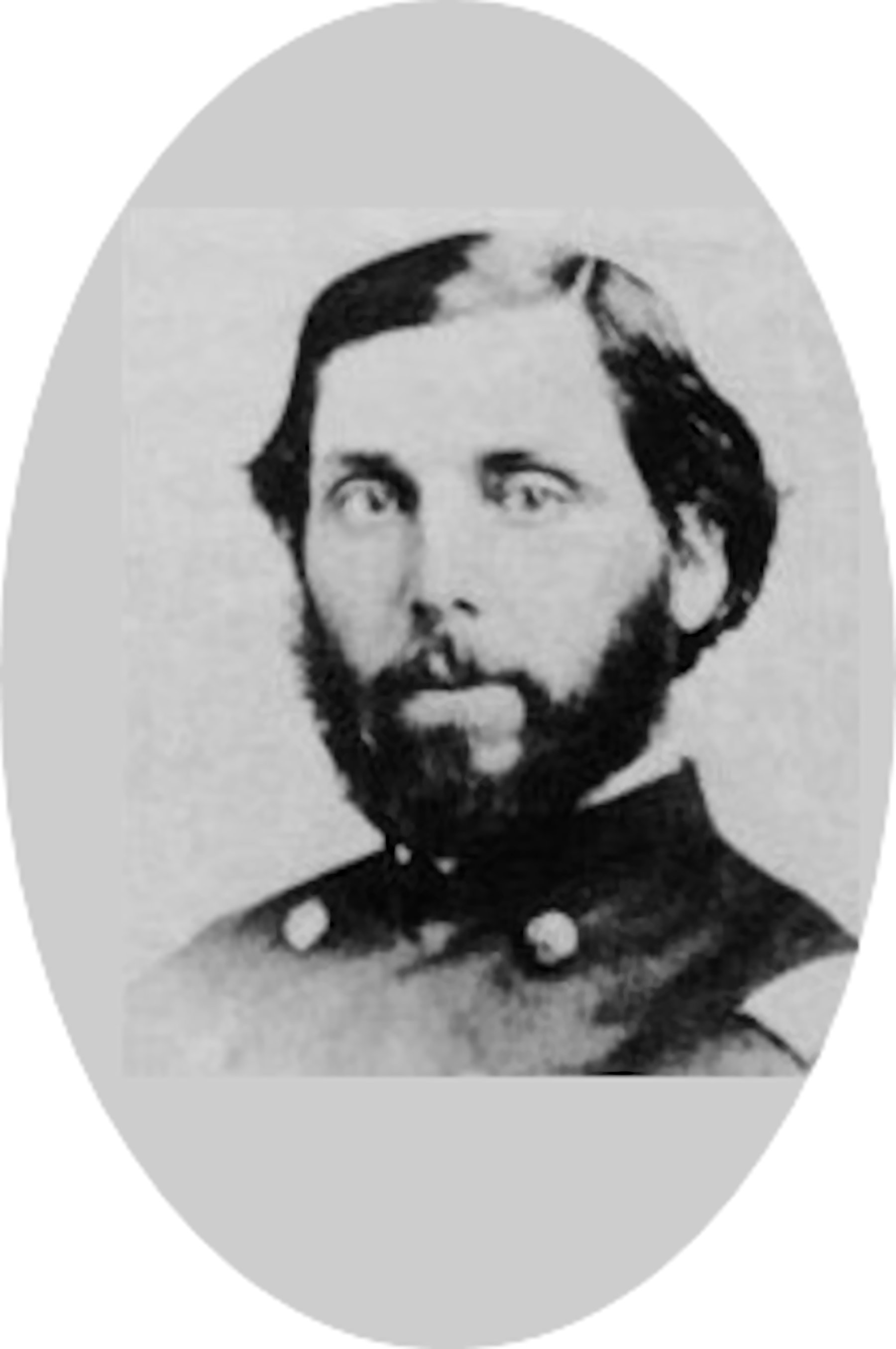
- Born: September 26, 1835; Bakersville, New York
- Died: July 1, 1908 (aged 72)
- Burial place: Lawrence, Kansas
- Military career
- Allegiance: United States
- Branch: United States Army
- Rank: Lieutenant colonel Brevet Brigadier general
- Units: 27th New York Volunteer Infantry Regiment; Company G, 121st New York Volunteer Infantry; 43rd United States Colored Troops
- Conflicts: American Civil War; Battle of Gaines's Mill; Second Battle of Rappahannock Station
- Awards: Medal of Honor

Hiram Seymour Hall (September 26, 1835 - July 1, 1908) was a Union Army officer in the American Civil War who received the U.S. military's highest decoration, the Medal of Honor

Hall was born in Barkersville, New York, on September 26, 1835. He was awarded the Medal of Honor, for extraordinary heroism shown on June 27, 1862, at the Battle of Gaines's Mill and on November 7, 1863, at the Second Battle of Rappahannock Station, while serving as a captain with Company G, 121st New York Infantry.

After the war, he returned to New York and married Augusta J. Galentine Hall (1842–1927). The couple had three children: Clarence Seymour Hall (1868–1922), Harry B. Hall (1869–1891), and Augusta J. Hall Kemper (1880–1940). His Medal of Honor was issued on August 17, 1891. Hall died at the age of 72, on July 1, 1908, survived by his wife and two of his children and was buried at Oak Hill Cemetery in Lawrence, Kansas.

== Medal of Honor citation ==
The President of the United States of America, in the name of Congress, takes pleasure in presenting the Medal of Honor to Second Lieutenant & Captain Henry Seymour Hall, United States Army, for extraordinary heroism on 27 June 1862, while serving with Company G, 121st New York Infantry, in action at Gaines Mill, Virginia. Although wounded Second Lieutenant Hall remained on duty and participated in the battle with his company. At Rappahannock Station, Virginia, 7 November 1863, while acting as aide, Captain Hall rendered gallant and prompt assistance in reforming the regiments inside the enemy's works.
