= R128 road (Ireland) =

Road in Ireland

R128 road
- Bóthar R128

Location
- Country: Ireland

Highway system
- Roads in Ireland; Motorways; Primary; Secondary; Regional

The R128 road is a regional road in Fingal, Ireland.

The official description of the R128 from the Roads Act 1993 (Classification of Regional Roads) Order 2012 reads:

R128: Lusk - Rush - Skerries, County Dublin

Between its junction with R127 Rathmore Road at Lusk and its junction with R127 at Balbriggan Street in the town of Skerries via Station Road at Lusk; Whitestown; Main Street and Skerries Road at Rush; Loughshinney Cross; Strand Street and Thomas Hand Street in the town of Skerries all in the county of Fingal.

== See also ==
- Roads in Ireland
- National primary road
- National secondary road
- Regional road
