= Charles Echlin =

Irish Member of Parliament

Charles Echlin (1682 – 26 March 1754) was an Irish Member of Parliament.

He was the eldest son of John Echlin, eldest of the three sons of Robert Echlin of Ardquin, County Down; his mother was Hester Godfrey, daughter of William Godfrey of Coleraine. His uncles were the judge and baronet Sir Henry Echlin and General Robert Echlin. The Echlin family had come to Ulster from Fife in Scotland in the early seventeenth century.

He married Anna Knox, daughter and co-heiress of Thomas Knox of Dungannon. They had one son Thomas, who died young.

He sat in the Irish House of Commons for Dungannon from 1727 until his death.

Since his son had died young his estate passed to his brother Robert.
