= Rush, County Dublin =

Small coastal town in northern County Dublin, Ireland

Rush Irish: Ros Eó
- Town
- An Ros (Irish)
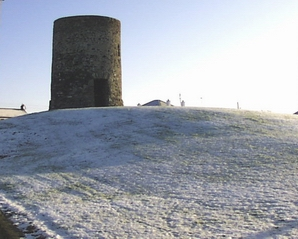
- Millbank, a ruined windmill on Chapel Green

- Location in Ireland
- Coordinates: 53.522°N 6.089°W
- Country: Ireland
- Province: Leinster
- County: County Dublin

Area
  - Total: 5.84 km^{2} (2.25 sq mi)
- Elevation: 1 m (3.3 ft)

Population (2022)
  - Total: 10,875
- Time zone: UTC±0 (WET)
  - Summer (DST): UTC+1 (IST)
- Eircode routing key: K56
- Telephone area code: +353(0)1
- Irish Grid Reference: O263543

Historical population
Year	Pop.	±%
1821	1,044	—
1831	2,144	+105.4%
1841	1,603	−25.2%
1851	1,496	−6.7%
1861	1,453	−2.9%
1871	1,238	−14.8%
1881	1,071	−13.5%
1891	1,130	+5.5%
1901	1,076	−4.8%
1911	804	−25.3%
1926	1,540	+91.5%
1936	1,651	+7.2%
1946	1,747	+5.8%
1951	1,925	+10.2%
1956	2,007	+4.3%
1961	2,118	+5.5%
1966	2,488	+17.5%
1971	2,633	+5.8%
1981	3,864	+46.8%
1986	4,514	+16.8%
1991	4,839	+7.2%
1996	5,429	+12.2%
2002	6,769	+24.7%
2006	8,286	+22.4%
2011	9,231	+11.4%
2022	10,875	+17.8%

Rush (Irish: Ros Eó, meaning 'peninsula of the yew trees' [ˈɾˠɔsˠ oː]), officially An Ros, is a small seaside commuter town in Fingal, County Dublin, Ireland. Rush lies on the Irish Sea coast, between Skerries and Lusk, and has a small harbour. It had a population at the 2022 census of 10,875.

Rush was once known as the "market garden of Ireland" for the large role market gardening played in its economy and culture. In the 21st century, Rush is no longer a major centre of national horticulture and has instead evolved into a growing commuter town on the northern fringes of the Greater Dublin Area.

== Geography ==
Rush lies on the Irish Sea coast, on the angle where the R128 regional road turns from running east–west from Lusk to go north–south to Skerries. It has a small harbour.

Rush is in a slightly hilly coastal area. Four streams come to the sea in the vicinity, St. Catherine's Stream, Kenure Stream, the Rush Town Stream, and a combined flow at the western edge of the town; some occasionally cause flooding. The middle two cross Rush's North Strand beach.

Rush is also a townland in the civil parish of Lusk in the barony of Balrothery East.

== History and historic features ==
There is evidence of settlement in the Rush area dating back to Neolithic times. Flint tools have been found in the area and there is a passage grave and cist located off the Skerries Road on the headland to the north of North Beach.

In medieval times Rush was a manor of the Earl of Ormond.

In 1744 a description of Rush by a traveller runs as follows:

This town is near an English mile in length [and] lies upon a sandy bank. Most of the houses are built of mud and covered with straw and exceedingly well peopled. By a modest computation 'tis said there is between 300/400 souls. The men are all employed by the fishing and smuggling trade...the quay lies eastward below the town, which is in [the] form of an L. The entrance is very dangerous from S.E. and by E. between two ledges of rocks on the port and larboard side.

The population at the time of the 1841 census was 1,603 inhabitants.

In November 1920, an Irish Republican Army (IRA) officer, Lieutenant John (or 'Jack') 'Rover' McCann, was shot by the Black and Tans after being taken from a house in Rush. The next morning, his body was found in a field 100 yards away. Today he is commemorated by a roadside monument on Quay Road. On 29 April 1920 the Naul Battalion of the IRA attacked the Rush RIC Barracks which resulted in the death of a policeman.

=== Drumanagh ===
A large promontory fort is located on the headland of Drumanagh, near Rush. It is surrounded on three sides by cliffs and a large rampart encloses the fourth side.

An article in The Sunday Times in January 1996 claimed that Roman coins, brooches and copper ingots were found at the site and that there was "clear evidence...of a Roman coastal fort of up to 40 acres...a significant Roman beachhead, built to support military campaigns in the 1st and 2nd centuries A.D.". This claim is disputed by many archaeologists who see this simply as evidence of trade between Ireland and the Romans. The artefacts were illegally excavated after being discovered with metal detectors, so they were not available for further study.

The land was acquired by Fingal County Council in 2016 and is of significant interest following the recovery of Romano-British artefacts, rarely found in Ireland. It has been characterised as the place where Roman traders may have landed.

A range of finds was made in the course of a "community archaeology" dig along two trenches by the Martello Tower at the Iron Age site. Fingal Community Archaeologist and excavation director, Christine Baker, said: “Growing up down the road and having been a scholar under the late Iron Age scholar, Prof Barry Raftery, I always dreamed of digging Drumanagh. Artefacts such as a belt brace of the Royal Downshire militia and Royal Artillery brass buttons were found alongside fragments of wine glasses, clay pipes and a range of pottery and food particles, adding to the story of the Martello.”

Evidence of earlier activity was also recovered during the dig including shards of pottery which have their origins in the Roman era, and two decorated Iron Age combs. Also found were two fragments of human bone which have been identified as part of a female skull dating back to BC170-AD52, as identified by osteologist Dr Linda Lynch and radiocarbon dated by Queen's University Belfast.

A conservation plan for the Drumanagh fort has been developed by Fingal County Council. Following a process of public consultation, the Drumanagh Conservation Study & Heritage Plan 2018-2023 contains accessible historical, archaeological, folkloric, and cartographic evidence.

It also sets out policies and objectives for the future protection and management of the site.

=== Saint Maur's church ===
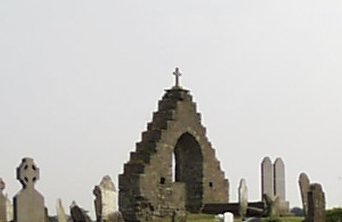
Ruins of the original St. Maur's chapel

The ruins of the original St. Maur's chapel lie in Whitestown cemetery, about a mile west of the centre of Rush. These date back to Anglo-Norman times and are named after Saint Maurus, a follower of St. Benedict. There is a legend connected with these ruins that some French navigators, who may have been crusaders, got caught in a storm. They made a vow to St. Maur that if they survived they would build a chapel in his honour on the first point of land they reached. They subsequently landed at Rogerstown and built a chapel there in his honour. The area became known as Knightstown and later Whitestown.

In 1776, a church was built closer to the centre of Rush to replace the old chapel. It was also dedicated to St. Maur and is one of the earliest examples of a penal Catholic church in the Fingal area. It now houses Rush library.

The current Catholic church of Saint Maur is beside the 1776 building. It was dedicated in 1989 and is in the new, post-Vatican II style.

=== Kenure House ===
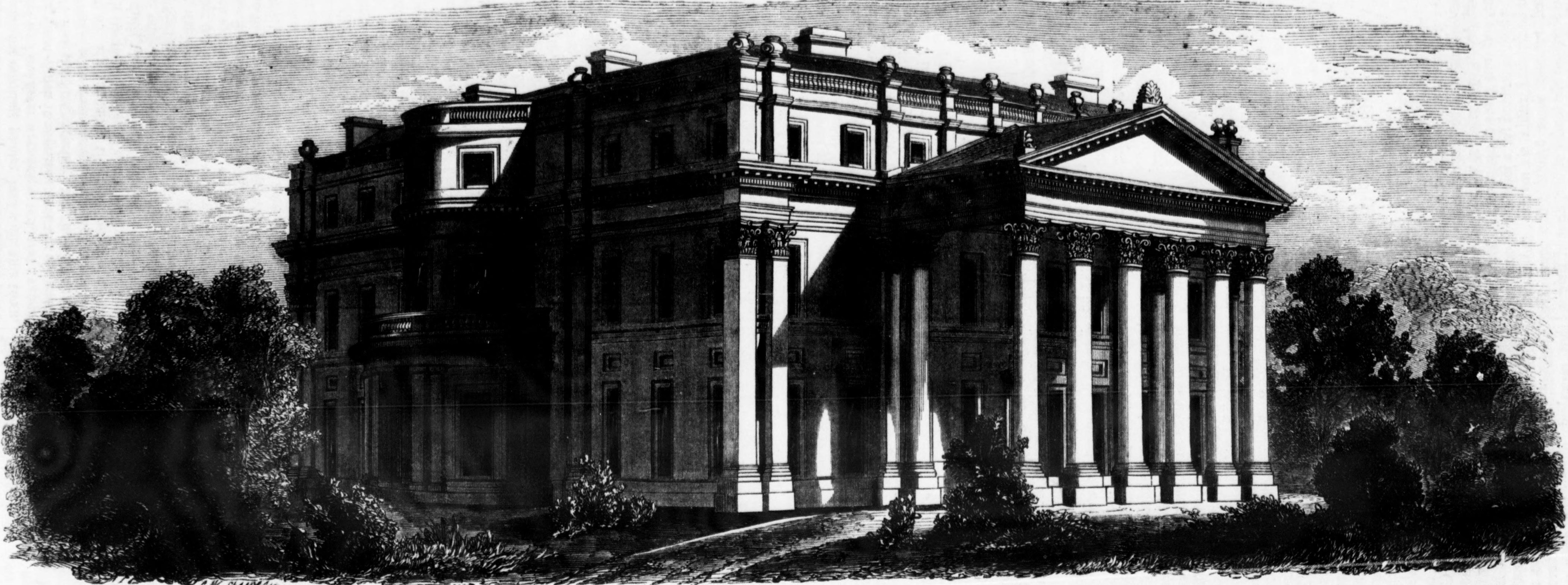
Kenure House

Two miles north from the centre of Rush village lies a magnificent portico which is all that remains of Kenure House, a large mansion which had many acres of an estate around it. The name is an anglicised version of "Ceann Iubhair", meaning headland of the yew trees. There is a nearby ruined church which was dedicated to St. Damnan and also nearby are the ruins of a small Norman keep.

Kenure formed part of the ancient manor of Rush, which was vested in the Earls and Dukes of Ormonde in 1666. They held on to their lands in Rush until 1714 when the Echlins took over. They remained there until 1780. Elizabeth Echlin married Francis Palmer of Castlelacken Co Mayo. Colonel R H Fenwick-Palmer, the last of the line, sold the estate to the Irish Land Commission in 1964. The portico of Kenure House was added to the house in and about 1840, by George Papworth, an English architect who practised in Ireland during the 19th century. Many films were made on location at the great house. These include The Face of Fu Manchu (1965), Ten Little Indians (1965 film which features the great house extensively as the main setting for the story, with some fleeting glimpses of the outside portico) and Jules Verne's Rocket to the Moon (aka Rocket to the Moon) (1967). The house fell into disrepair and was demolished in 1978, when the housing estate Saint Catherines was built on part of the former estate. A number of Rush people did protest at the time, and managed to prevent at least the portico from being destroyed.

=== Smuggling ===
Rush was notorious for smuggling in the 18th century after the British imposed excise duties on a large number of goods. It was home to the famed smuggler, Jack Connor (aka Jack the Batchelor and also Jack Field) and was the birthplace of the pirate Luke Ryan on 14 February 1750. Ryan is said to have been a privateer for the French government during the American Revolutionary War. He was reportedly arrested and tried as a pirate at the Old Bailey. He was arrested on 25 February 1789 and supposedly died in prison on 18 June 1789 aged 39 due to septicaemia during his imprisonment for failing to pay a debt of £200.

Jack Connor was a popular Robin hood type figure who is mentioned in an old ballad:

The lover may sigh
The courtier may lie
And Croesus his treasure amass,
All these joys are but vain
They are blended with pain
I'll stand behind Field and my glass

Jack operated out of the "Smugglers Cave" between Loughshinny and Skerries. He died in 1772 and was buried in Kenure cemetery, on the outskirts of Rush. His namesake is used for Jack the Bachelors, a steakhouse and bar on Main Street.

Luke Ryan was born in Rush in 1750. He emigrated to France when he was young and became a Lieutenant in Dillon's Irish Regiment. He later became a smuggler after returning to Rush. He was commissioned by Benjamin Franklin to run a privateer, The Black prince, to plunder English ships. He accumulated great wealth from his smuggling, but it was taken from him by the French. He eventually died in a debtors' prison in 1789 owing a debt of 200 pounds.

=== Martello towers ===
Rush is home to 2 of the 29 Martello Towers in the Greater Dublin Area; they are on the headland near the North Beach and at Drumanagh, and were built in 1804 as a defence against Napoleon.

== Amenities ==
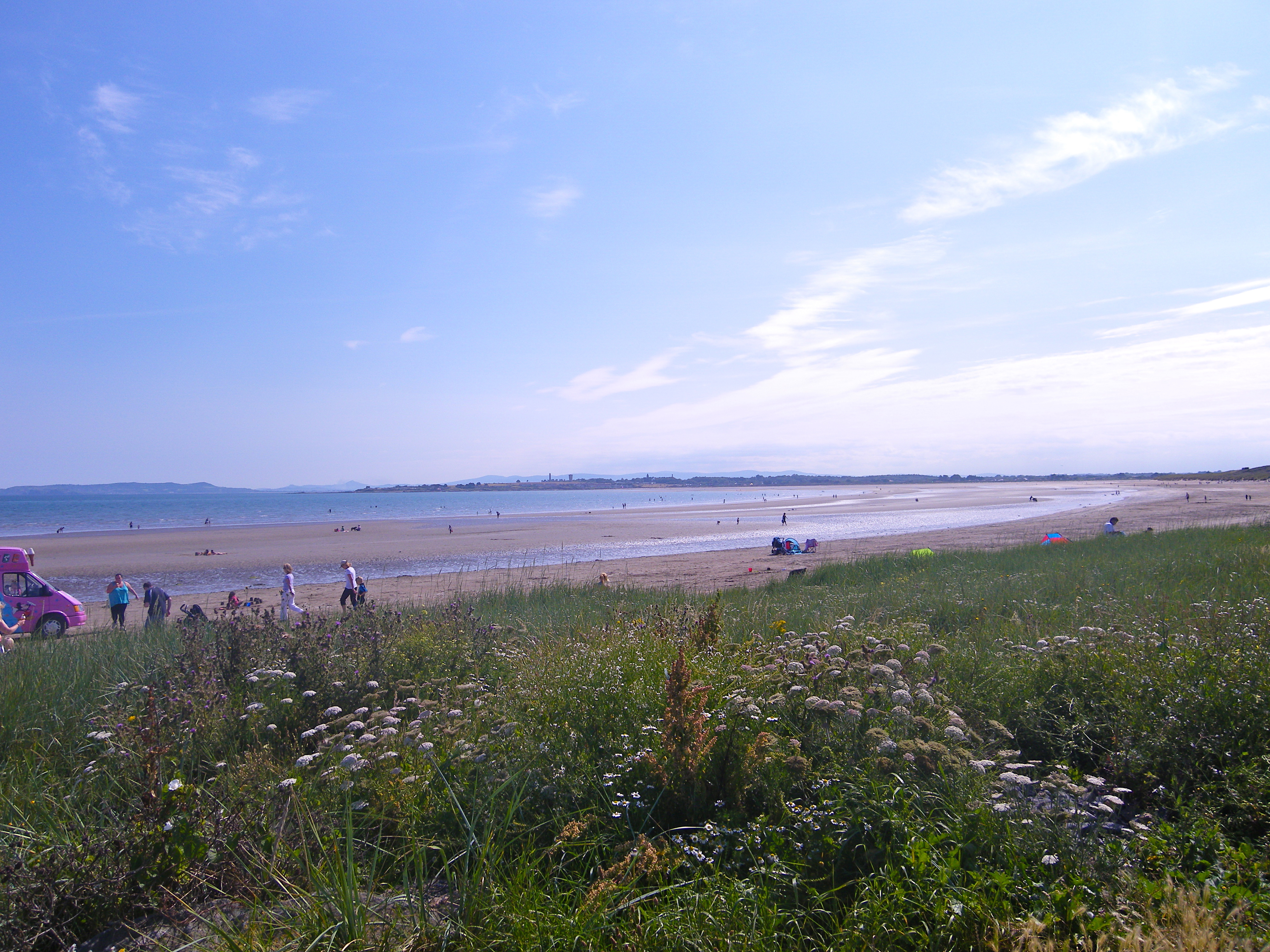
The beach at Rush, Summer 2011

Rush has two sandy beaches, called the North Beach and South Beach, which are separated by the rocky head of the peninsula and a small tidal harbour, Rush Harbour. The peninsula is the closest point of land to the privately owned Lambay Island. The prevailing winds and tides make Rush South Beach an extremely popular kitesurfing location while its sand and dunes attract many visitors. Close to the south shore is 9 hole golf links. In the past, Rush had many caravan sites which were popular for summer holidays. It still has some caravan sites close to its beaches.

Rush sailing club is also located near the south shore and operates from a second harbour, Rogerstown harbour, situated on the Rogerstown Estuary, known locally as 'the pier.' This harbour is also used by a supply boat, The Shamrock, which provides supplies for the inhabitants of Lambay island.

Rush has several pubs and clubs together with a small number of restaurants. The local Millbank Theatre, home to Rush Dramatic Society is respected for its quality plays and dramas. Rush Musical Society is well respected for its annual productions also.

=== Education ===
Rush has three primary schools, Gaelscoil Ros Eo, Rush National School, and St. Catherines National School.

There is also a secondary school, St.Joseph's Secondary School.

== Transport ==
Rush and Lusk railway station, opened on 25 May 1844, is served by Commuter (formerly "Arrow") suburban trains between Dublin and Drogheda.

Fingal Express is the privately owned, premium coach service from Skerries, Rush and Lusk to Dublin City Centre and UCD. It is a division of Eirebus.

== Sport ==
Rush is home to several sports clubs, including Naomh Maur GAA club, Rush Athletic FC, Rush Sailing Club and Rush Cricket Club. There are also several martial arts schools, including a Taekwon-Do academy, and karate club.

Shamrock Rovers and Ireland footballer Stephen McPhail is from Rush and played for Rush Athletic in his junior years as did former Ireland U21 Captain David Worrell. England cricket captain Eoin Morgan grew up in Rush; he and his family represented Rush Cricket Club for a number of years.

== Religion ==
Rush is a parish in the Fingal North deanery of the Roman Catholic Archdiocese of Dublin.

== People ==
- Isibeal Atkinson, Irish footballer
- Joe Clarke, Irish revolutionary
- Derek Landy, Irish author
- Stephen McPhail, Irish footballer
- Eoin Morgan, Irish cricketer
- David Worrell, Irish footballer

== Twinning ==
Rush is twinned with the following places:

- Gourin, Brittany, France
- San Mauro Castelverde, Sicily, Italy

== See also ==
- List of towns and villages in Ireland
