= Robert Echlin (1674–1706) =

Irish politician (1674–1706)

Robert Echlin (1674 – 20 November 1706) was an Irish Member of Parliament.

He was the eldest son of Sir Henry Echlin, 1st Baronet, and his wife Agnes Mussen, daughter of the Reverend William Mussen. His father, who outlived him, had been second Baron of the Court of Exchequer (Ireland), and was created a baronet in 1721. Although the family had influential connections, the premature death of Robert's grandfather seems to have left them in some poverty: Robert's father rebuilt the family fortunes and became a substantial landowner, with his principal seat at Clonagh Castle.

Robert married Penelope Eustace, daughter and co-heiress of Sir Maurice Eustace, of the prominent landowning family of Harristown, County Kildare, and his first wife Anne Colville, daughter of Sir Robert Colville and his first wife Penelope Rawdon, by whom he was the father of Sir Robert Echlin, 2nd Baronet. After his death Penelope remarried Edward Stratford, who was the father through his first wife of John Stratford, 1st Earl of Aldborough.

He sat in the Irish House of Commons for Newtownards from 1692 to 1693, and for Newry from 1695 to 1699 and from 1703 until his death.
