= Members of the 1689 Irish Parliament =

The Patriot Parliament is the name given to the Irish Parliament called by James II during the 1689 to 1691 war in Ireland. The first parliament called in Dublin since that of 1666 in the reign of Charles II, it held only one session, from 7 May 1689 to 20 July 1689.

The House of Commons was 70 members short as there were no elections in Counties Fermanagh and Donegal. The members were overwhelmingly drawn from the Catholic Old English, and from among Catholic gentry and aldermen. Sir Richard Nagle was elected Speaker of the Irish House of Commons while the Irish House of Lords was led by Baron Fitton; the Lords contained five Protestant peers and four Church of Ireland bishops, including Anthony Dopping, Bishop of Meath, who acted as leader of the opposition.

== Members of the Lords ==
Fitton spent much of his adult life in prison for criminal libel; allegedly selected by James because he was a Protestant, he promptly converted to Catholicism. The upper house which assembled included five Protestant peers, Granard, Longford, Barrymore, Howth and Rosse, who was Tyrconnell's son-in-law, plus four Church of Ireland bishops; Anthony Dopping, Bishop of Meath, acted as leader of the opposition.

The members of the House of Lords in 1689 were as follows:

Name	Title
Michael Boyle	Archbishop of Armagh
Alexander MacDonnell	Earl of Antrim
Thomas Nugent (Assumed the title in place of his elder brother Richard, a Capuchin friar.)	Earl of Westmeath
Richard Barry	Earl of Barrymore
Richard or Charles Lambart	Earl of Cavan
Donough MacCarty	Earl of Clancarty
Richard Power	Earl of Tyrone
Francis Aungier	Earl of Longford
Arthur Forbes	Earl of Granard
William Dongan	Earl of Limerick
Jenico Preston	Viscount Gormanston
Richard Butler	Viscount Mountgarret
Theobald Dillon	Viscount Dillon of Costello-Gallen
Nicholas Netterville	Viscount Netterville of Dowth
Bryan Magennis	Viscount Magennis of Iveagh
Dominick Sarsfield	Viscount Sarsfield of Killmallock
Theobald Bourke	Viscount Mayo
Pierce Butler	Viscount Ikerrin
Maximilian O'Dempsey	Viscount Clanmalier
Nicholas Barnewall	Viscount Barnewall of Kingsland
Pierce Butler	Viscount Galmoye
Daniel O'Brien	Viscount Clare
Richard Parsons	Viscount Rosse
Ulick Bourke	Viscount Galway
Valentine Browne	Viscount Kenmare
Justin MacCarty	Viscount Mountcashell
Anthony Dopping	Bishop of Meath
Ezekiel Hopkins	Bishop of Derry
Thomas Otway	Bishop of Ossory
Simon Digby	Bishop of Limerick
Edward Wetenhall	Bishop of Cork
William Smyth	Bishop of Raphoe
Richard Tennison	Bishop of Killala
Edward Bermingham	Baron Athenry
Almeric de Courcy	Baron Kingsale
William Fitzmaurice	Baron Kerry
Christopher Fleming	Baron Slane
Thomas St Lawrence	Baron Howth
Matthias Barnewall	Baron Trimlestown
Christopher Plunkett	Baron Dunsany
Pierce Butler	Baron Dunboyne
Barnaby Fitzpatrick	Baron Upper Ossory
Matthew Plunkett	Baron Louth
William Bourke	Baron Bourke of Castleconnell
Theobald Butler	Baron Cahir
Theobald Bourke	Baron Bourke of Brittas
Henry Vincent Blayney	Baron Blayney of Monaghan
Dermot Malone	Baron Glean-O'Mallun and Courchy (This title had probably been extinct since about 1641.)
Roger Maguire	Baron Maguire of Enniskillen (This title had been forfeit since 1645.)
Claud Hamilton; Earl of Abercorn in the peerage of Scotland	Baron Hamilton of Strabane
Robert King	Baron Kingston
John Bellew	Baron Bellew of Duleek
Alexander Fitton; Lord Chancellor	Baron Fitton of Gawsworth
John Bourke	Baron Bourke of Bophin
Thomas Nugent; Lord Chief Justice	Baron Nugent of Riverston

== Members of the Commons ==
The House was 70 members short, since no elections were held in the northern provinces of Fermanagh and Donegal. Six members were Protestant, the remaining 224 Catholic, a minority being Gaelic or 'Old Irish', while the majority were from the Old English Catholic elite. The Speaker or leader was Sir Richard Nagle, a wealthy Catholic lawyer and close ally of Tyrconnell.

County Antrim
Constituency	First Member	Notes	Second Member	Notes
County Antrim	Cormuck O'Neale		Randal Mac Donnell	
Belfast	Marcus Talbot		Daniel O'Neale	
County Armagh
Constituency	First Member	Notes	Second Member	Notes
Armagh City	Francis Stafford		Constantine O'Neale	
County Armagh	Arthur Brownlow		Walter Hovendon	
County Carlow
Constituency	First Member	Notes	Second Member	Notes
Carlow	Mark Baggot		John Warren	
County Carlow	Dudley Bagenal	(1638–1712)	Henry Luttrell	(d. 1717)
Old Leighlin	Darby Long		Daniel Doran	
County Cavan
Constituency	First Member	Notes	Second Member	Notes
Belturbet	Sir Edward Tyrrell Bt.		Philip Tuite	Newcastle, County Cavan
Cavan Borough	Philip Oge O'Reyly		Hugh Reily	Lara
County Cavan	Philip Reyley	Aghnecrevy	John Reyly	Garirobuck
County Clare
Constituency	First Member	Notes	Second Member	Notes
County Clare	Daniel O'Brien		John MacNamara	Crattlagh
Ennis	Florence MacNamara	Dromod	Theobald Butler	Shrangaloon
County Cork
Constituency	First Member	Notes	Second Member	Notes
Cork City	Sir James Cotter	knight	John Galloway	
County Cork	Justin McCarthy		Sir Richard Nagle	Clogher, knight
Kinsale	Andrew Murrogh		Miles de Courcy	
Baltimore	Daniel O'Donavan		Jeremiah O'Donovan	Protestant
Bandonbridge	Charles MacCarthy	Ballea	Daniel MacCarthy Reagh	MacCarthy Reagh
Charleville	John Baggot, Sr.	Baggotstown	John Power	Killballane
Clonakilty (also Cloghnakilty)	Lt.-Col. Owen MacCarthy		Daniel Fionn MacCarthy	
Doneraile	Daniel O'Donovan		John Baggot, Jr.	Baggotstown
Midleton	Dermod Long		John Long	
Mallow (also Moyallow)	John Barret	Castlemore	David Nagle	Carragowne
Rathcormack	James Barry	Barry was later absolved of treason on the basis that he was elected without his knowledge while in England.	Edward Powel	
Youghal	Thomas Uniack	alderman	Edward Gough	alderman
County Dublin
Constituency	First Member	Notes	Second Member	Notes
Dublin City	Sir Michael Creagh	Lord Mayor of Dublin, knight	Terence MacDermott	alderman
County Dublin	Simon Luttrell	Luttrellstowne	Patrick Sarsfield	Lucan
Newcastle	Thomas Arthur	Colganstown	John Talbot	Belgard
Swords	Francis Barnwall	Woodparke, County Meath	Robert Russell	Drynham
Dublin University	Sir John Meade, Bt	knight	Joseph Coghlan	
County Down
Constituency	First Member	Notes	Second Member	Notes
County Down	Murtogh Mac Gennis	Green-Castle	Ever Mac Gennis	Castlewellan
Killyleagh (also Killileagh)	Bernard Mac Gennis	Ballygorianbeg	Torl O'Neile	Drummekelly
Newry	Rowland White		Rowland Savage	
County Galway
Constituency	First Member	Notes	Second Member	Notes
Athenry	James Talbot	Mount Talbot	Charles Daly	Dunsandle
Galway Town	Oliver Martin		Sir John Kirwan	
County Galway	Sir Ulick Burke	Glinsk	Sir Walter Blake	
Tuam	James Lally	Tullindaly	William Bourk	Carrowfrila
County Kerry
Constituency	First Member	Notes	Second Member	Notes
Ardfert	Col. Roger McElligott		Cornelius MacGillicuddy	
Dingle (also Dingle Icouch)	Edward Rice FitzJames	Ballinelig, County Limerick	John Hussey	Culmullin
County Kerry	Nicholas Brown		Sir Thomas Crosbie	knight
Tralee	Maurice Hussey	Kerrys	James Hackett	alderman
County Kildare
Constituency	First Member	Notes	Second Member	Notes
Athy	William FitzGerald		William Archbold	
Harristown	James Nihell		Edmond FitzGerald	
Kildare	Francis Leigh		Robert Porter	
County Kildare	John Wogan		George Aylmer	
Naas	Viscount Dungan		Charles White	
County Kilkenny
Constituency	First Member	Notes	Second Member	Notes
Callan	Walter Butler		Thady Meagher	
Gowran	Colonel Robert Fielding	womaniser	Walter Kelly	doctor of physick
Inistioge	Edward FitzGerald		James FitzGerald	
Kilkenny City	John Rooth	Mayor	James Bryan	alderman
County Kilkenny	John Grace	Courtstown	Robert Walsh	Cloneneassy
Knocktopher	Harvey Morres		Henry Meagh	
Thomastown	Robert Grace Sr.		Robert Grace Jr.	
King's County (Offaly)
Constituency	First Member	Notes	Second Member	Notes
Banagher	Terence Coghlan	Esq.	Terence Coghlan	gentleman
King's County	Heward Oxburgh		Owen Carrol	
Philipstown	John Connor		Heward Oxburgh	
County Leitrim
Constituency	First Member	Notes	Second Member	Notes
Jamestown	Alexander Mac Donnell		William Shanley	
County Leitrim	Edmond Reynolds		Iriel Farrell	
County Limerick
Constituency	First Member	Notes	Second Member	Notes
Askeaton	John Bourke	Cahirmoyhill	Edward Rice	
Kilmallock	Sir William Hurley, Bt.		John Lacy	
Limerick City	Nicholas Arthur	alderman	Thomas Harrold	alderman
County Limerick	Sir John FitzGerald, Bt.		Gerald FitzGerald	Knight of Glin
County Longford
Constituency	First Member	Notes	Second Member	Notes
Lanesborough	Oliver FitzGerald		Roger Farrell	
County Longford	Roger Farrell		Robert Farrell	
St Johnstown	Sir William Ellis	Protestant	Lt.-Col. James Nugent	
County Louth
Constituency	First Member	Notes	Second Member	Notes
Ardee	Hugh Gernon		John Babe	
Carlingford	Christopher Peppard FitzIgnatius		Bryan Dermot	
Dundalk	Robert Dermot		John Dowdall	
Drogheda	Henry Dowdall	recorder	Christopher Peppard FitzGeorge	alderman
County Louth	Thomas Bellew		William Talbot	
County Mayo
Constituency	First Member	Notes	Second Member	Notes
Castlebar	John Bermingham	portreeve	Thomas Bourke	
County Mayo	Gerald Moore		Walter Bourke	
County Meath
Constituency	First Member	Notes	Second Member	Notes
Athboy	John Trynder		Robert Longfield	
Kells	Patrick Everard		John Delamare	
County Meath	Sir William Talbot, Bt.		Sir Patrick Barnwall, Bt.	
Navan	Christopher Cusack	Corballis	Christopher Cusack	Rathaldran
Ratoath	John Hussey		James FitzGerald	
Trim	Capt. Nicholas Cusack		Walter Nangle	
County Monaghan
Constituency	First Member	Notes	Second Member	Notes
	Bryan Mac Mahon		Hugh Mac Mahon	
Queen's County (Laois)
Constituency	First Member	Notes	Second Member	Notes
Ballynakill	Sir Gregory Byrne, Bt.		Oliver Grace	Chief Remembrancer of the Exchequer
Maryborough	Pierce Bryan		Thady FitzPatrick	
Portarlington	Sir Henry Bond, Bt.		Sir Thomas Hackett	knight
Queen's County	Sir Patrick Trant	knight	Edmond Morres	
County Roscommon
Constituency	First Member	Notes	Second Member	Notes
Boyle	Capt. John King		Terence Mac Dermot	alderman
Roscommon	John Dillon		John Kelly	
County Roscommon	Charles Kelly		John Bourke	
County Sligo
Constituency	First Member	Notes	Second Member	Notes
Sligo	Terence Mac Donogh		James French	
County Sligo	Henry Crofton	Longford House, Beltra	Oliver O'Gara	
County Tipperary
Constituency	First Member	Notes	Second Member	Notes
Cashel	Denis Kearny	alderman	James Hackett	alderman
Clonmel	Nicholas White	alderman	John Bray	alderman
Fethard	Sir John Everard, Bt.		James Tobin	Fethard
Tipperary	Nicholas Purcell	Loughmore	James Butler	Graingebegg
County Tyrone
Constituency	First Member	Notes	Second Member	Notes
Dungannon	Arthur O'Neale		Peter Donnelly	Dungannon
Strabane	Christopher Nugent		Daniel Donnelly	
Tyrone	Colonel Gordon O'Neill		Lewis Doe	Dungannon
County Waterford
Constituency	First Member	Notes	Second Member	Notes
Dungarvan	John Hore		Martin Hore	
Waterford City	John Porter		Nicholas FitzGerald	
County Waterford	John Power		Matthew Hore	
County Westmeath
Constituency	First Member	Notes	Second Member	Notes
Athlone	Edmond Malone	Ballynahoune	Edmond Malone	counsellor at law
Fore (also Fowre)	John Nugent	Donore	Christopher Nugent	Dardistown
Kilbeggan	Bryan Geoghegan	Donore	Charles Geoghegan	Syonane
Mullingar	Gerald Dillon	prime sergeant	Edmond Nugent	Carlanstowne
County Westmeath	William Nugent		Hon. Col. Henry Dillon	
County Wexford
Constituency	First Member	Notes	Second Member	Notes
Bannow	Francis Plowden		Dr. Alexius Stafford	
Clonmines (also Cloghmine)	Edward Sherlock	Dublin City	Nicholas White	Rosse, merchant
Enniscorthy	James Devereux	Carigmenan	Arthur Waddington	portreeve
Fethard	Rt Hon. Col. James Porter		Capt. Nicholas Stafford	
Gorey (also Newburgh)	Abraham Strange	Toberduffe	Richard Doyle	Kilcorky
New Ross	Luke Dormer		Richard Butler	
Taghmon	George Hore	Polehore	Walter Hore	Harperstown
Wexford	William Talbot		Francis Rooth	merchant
County Wexford	Walter Butler	Monfin	Patrick Colclough	Mochury
County Wicklow
Constituency	First Member	Notes	Second Member	Notes
Blessington	James Eustace		Sir Maurice Eustace	
Carysfort	Hugh Roe Byrne		Pierce Archbold	(upon default of whose appearance Bartholomew Polewhele)
Wicklow	Francis Toole		Thomas Byrne	
County Wicklow	Richard Butler		William Talbot	

== Sources ==
- Harris, Tim (2007). Revolution: The Great Crisis of the British Monarchy, 1685–1720. Penguin. ISBN 978-0141016528.
- McGuire, James (2004). Nagle, Sir Richard (Online ed.). Oxford DNB.
- Moody; Martin; Byrne, eds. (2009). A New History of Ireland: Volume III: Early Modern Ireland 1534-1691. OUP. ISBN 9780198202424.
- Stater, Victor (2004). "Fitton, Alexander [styled Sir Alexander Fitton], Jacobite Baron Fitton (d. 1699), politician and Jacobite sympathizer". Oxford Dictionary of National Biography (online ed.). Oxford University Press. doi:10.1093/ref:odnb/9520. (Subscription, Wikipedia Library access or UK public library membership required.)
- Szechi, Daniel (1994). The Jacobites: Britain and Europe 1688-1788. Manchester University Press. ISBN 9780719037740.
