= Audley Mervyn (disambiguation) =

Sir Audley Mervyn (died 1675) was an MP for County Tyrone and Speaker of the Irish House of Commons.

Audley Mervyn may also refer to:

- Audley Mervyn (died 1717), Irish MP for Strabane and County Tyrone
- Audley Mervyn (died 1746), Irish MP for County Tyrone
