= Speaker of the Irish House of Commons =

Office in the pre-1801 Irish Parliament

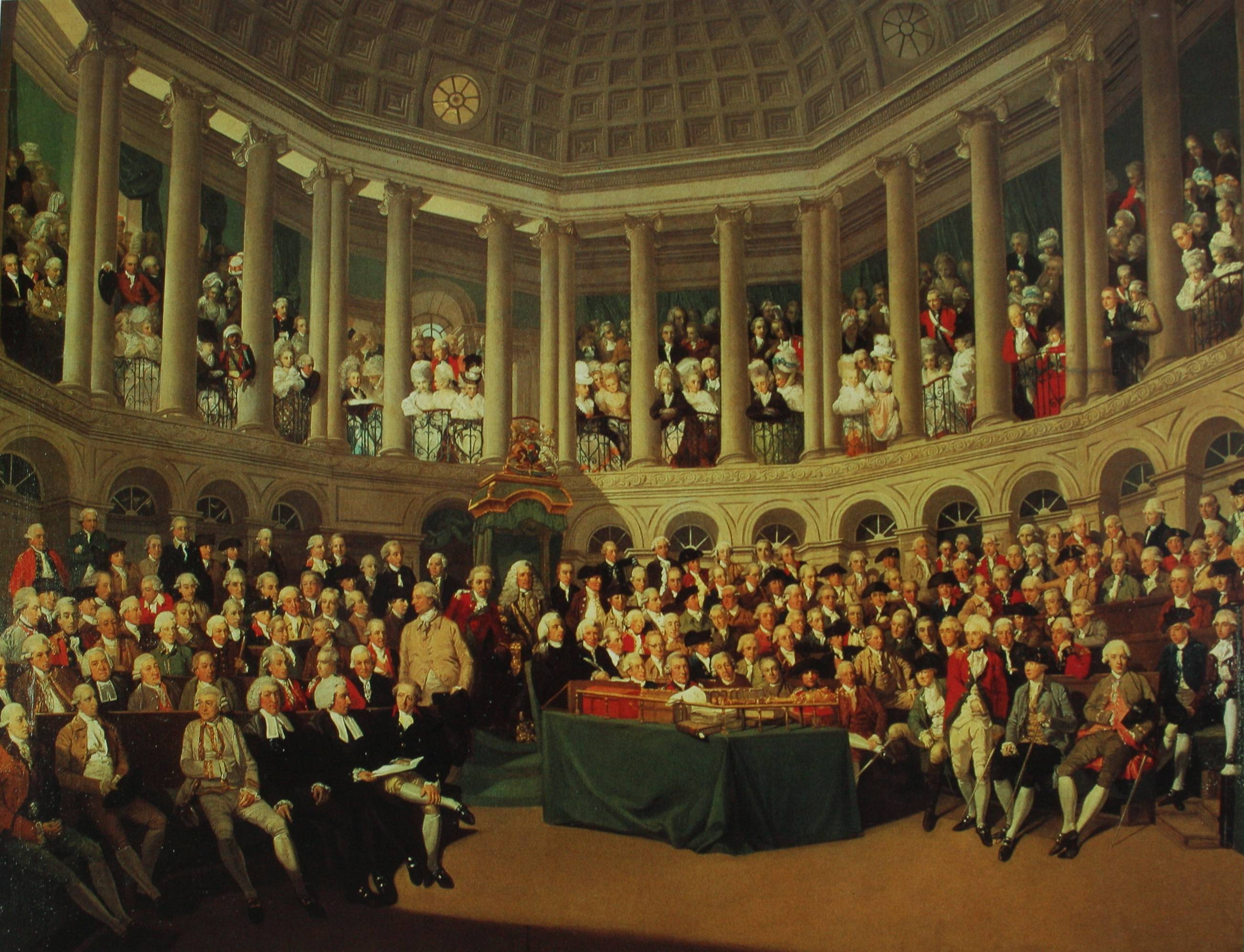
The Irish House of Commons in session under Speaker Pery.

The Speaker of the Irish House of Commons was the presiding officer of the Irish House of Commons until its disestablishment in 1800.

In the absence of a government chosen from and answerable to the Commons, the Speaker was the dominant political figure in the Parliament of Ireland. Unlike in modern British and Irish parliamentary practice, the Speaker was not expected to be politically impartial and several Speakers held government or Crown-appointed positions while also presiding over the Commons. Even so, the conduct of everyday business in the House was generally overseen with impartiality and fairness by all holders of the Speakership. The position was one of considerable power and prestige in Ireland, and the holder enjoyed high precedence as the first gentleman in Ireland.

Speakers of the Commons were elected on the first day of the session of a new parliament, unless the sitting Speaker resigned his post. Before the reign of Queen Anne elections to the chair were uncontested. However, the House increasingly reflected the virulent political divisions between Whig and Tory factions, and Alan Brodrick's second candidacy was contested in 1713. Further contested elections occurred in 1771, 1776 and 1790.

From 1771 the Speaker had a considerable degree of independence from the government of the Lord Lieutenant of Ireland, although the Speaker was regularly consulted on the executive's business. Speakers needed to have considerable wealth to carry out their conventional roles as sources of patronage in Ireland, and the Speaker was expected to host all Members of Parliament several times year. The Speaker held the casting vote when the House divided as primus inter pares.

The position was abolished when the Parliament of Ireland was merged with that of Great Britain to form the Parliament of the United Kingdom following the Acts of Union 1800. The last Speaker was John Foster, who had been a vehement opponent of the Union while in the chair.

== List of speakers ==
Speaker	Term of office		Portrait	Date(s) of election	Constituency	Notes	Peerage
John Chevir	1450				Kilkenny City		
Thomas Cusack	1541	1543					
James Stanihurst	1557	1568		1557; 1560; 1568	Dublin City		
Nicholas Walsh	1585	1586			Waterford City		
John Davies	1613	1615			County Fermanagh		
Nathaniel Catelyn	1634	1635			Dublin City		
Maurice Eustace	1640	1649			Athy		
Audley Mervyn	1661	1661			County Tyrone		
John Temple	1661	1662			Carlow		
Audley Mervyn	1662	1666			County Tyrone		
Sir Richard Nagle	1689	1692			County Cork	Speaker during the Patriot Parliament.	
Sir Richard Levinge, 1st Baronet	1692	1695		5 October 1692	Blessington		
Robert Rochfort	1695	1703		27 August 1695	County Westmeath		
Alan Brodrick (first term)	1703	1710		21 September 1703	County Westmeath	Resigned after his appointment as Lord Chief Justice of the Queen's Bench in 1710.	Viscount Midleton
John Forster	1710	1713		19 May 1710	Dublin City		
Alan Brodrick (second term)	1713	1714		15 November 1713	County Westmeath		Viscount Midleton
William Conolly	1715	1729		12 November 1715; 28 November 1727	County Londonderry	Also First Commissioner of the Revenue (Ireland). Resigned on the grounds of ill health on 13 October 1729.	
Sir Ralph Gore, 4th Baronet	1729	1733		13 October 1729	Clogher	Also Chancellor of the Exchequer of Ireland. Died in office.	
Henry Boyle	1733	1756		4 October 1733	County Cork	Also Chancellor of the Exchequer of Ireland. Resigned having been granted an Irish peerage on 17 April 1756.	Earl of Shannon
John Ponsonby	1756	1771		26 April 1756; 22 October 1761; 17 October 1769	Newtownards	Also First Commissioner of the Revenue (Ireland). Resigned following a political disagreement with Lord Townshend on 4 March 1771.	
Edmund Pery	1771	1785		7 March 1771; 18 June 1776; 14 October 1783	Limerick City	Resigned on the grounds of ill health on 5 September 1785.	Viscount Pery
John Foster	1785	1800		5 September 1785; 2 July 1790; 9 January 1798	County Louth	Last Speaker; position abolished under the Acts of Union 1800.	Baron Oriel
