= John Temple (Irish politician) =

Irish politician (1632–1705)

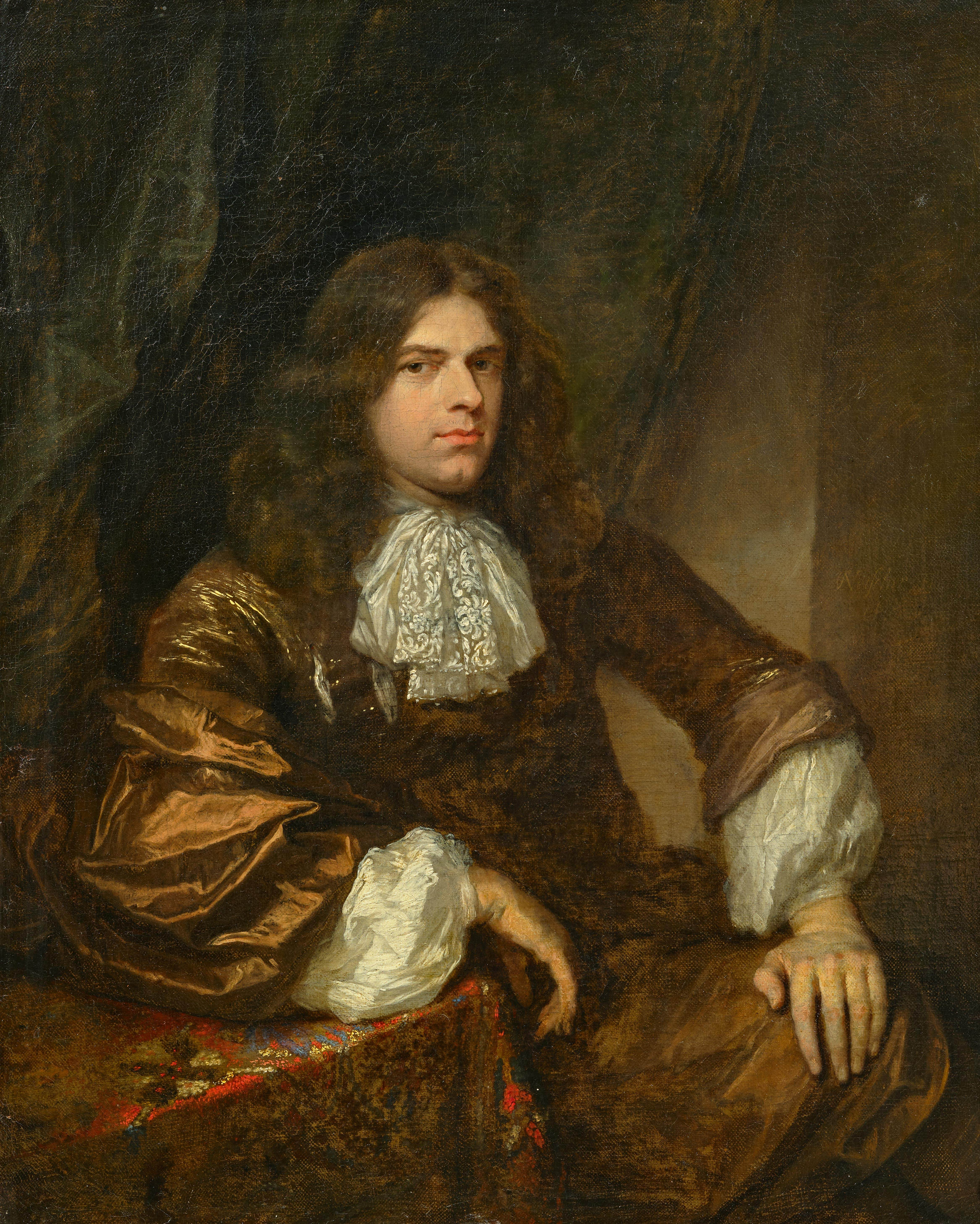
1671 portrait of Temple by Caspar Netscher

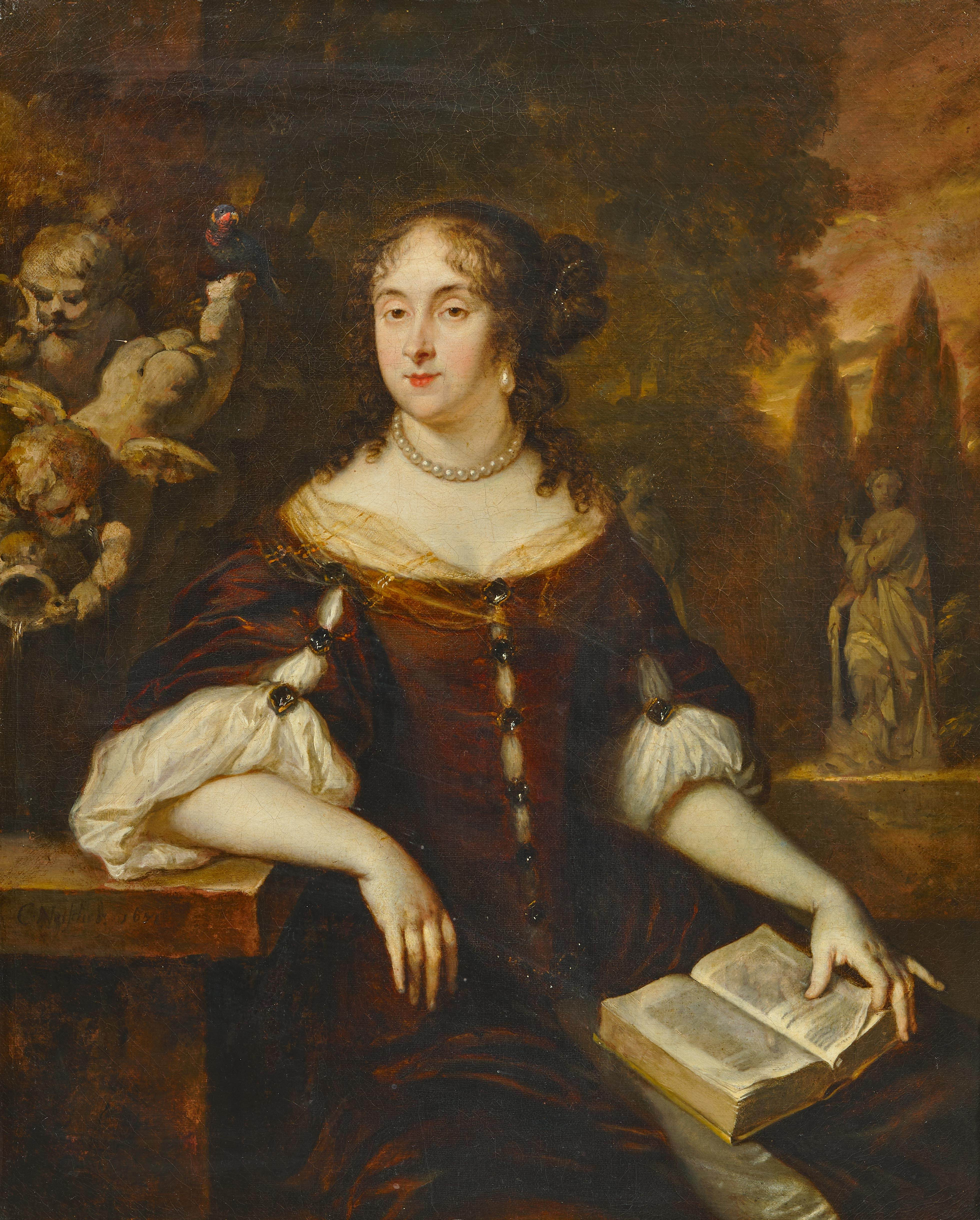
Caspar Netscher: Portrait of Jane Yarner Temple, 1671

Sir John Temple (25 March 1632 – 10 March 1705) was an Irish politician, Speaker of the Irish House of Commons and Attorney General for Ireland. He was the great-great-grandfather of the distinguished statesman Henry John Temple, 3rd Viscount Palmerston. His descendants in the female line include the famous poet Lord Byron.

== Biography ==
Temple was born in London on 25 March 1632. He was a son of Sir John Temple and his wife Mary Hammond, daughter of Dr. John Hammond, of Chertsey, Surrey. He was the brother of Sir William Temple, 1st Baronet, the distinguished diplomat and friend of Jonathan Swift. He was educated at Christ Church, Oxford where he was awarded BA in 1649 and was admitted to Lincoln's Inn on 4 May 1650. He was awarded MA at Cambridge University in 1652 and was called to the bar in 1657.

Immediately prior to the Stuart Restoration in 1660, Temple was a representative at the Irish Convention. In July 1660, he was appointed Solicitor General for Ireland, and in May 1661, he was elected to the Irish House of Commons as member for Carlow; in September, he began acting as Speaker of the Irish House of Commons while the previous Speaker, Sir Audley Mervyn was in London. He was knighted on 15 August 1663. On the death of Charles II in 1685, Temple, although a staunch Protestant was happy to continue in office under the Roman Catholic James II, and so remained until the Jacobite takeover of 1689, which involved the exclusion of all Protestant office holders in Ireland; at which time he fled to England, and had his estates confiscated by the Patriot Parliament.

On his return to Ireland in 1691, he was granted title to some 12,000 acres in County Sligo; these lands were confiscated from the native Irish.

After the Glorious Revolution of 1688 had ended with the defeat of the Jacobite forces in 1691, he returned to Ireland, and served as Attorney General for Ireland until May 1695.

He retired to his estates at East Sheen, south of London, and died there on 10 March 1705.

== Family ==
Temple married Jane Yarner (died 1708), daughter of Sir Abraham Yarner (died 1677), the Muster-master for Ireland, in 1663 and had numerous children with her, of whom at least seven reached adulthood. he had two surviving sons:

- John, of Dublin, married his cousin Elizabeth Temple, but had no children.
- Henry (c.1673–1757) became the first Viscount Palmerston.

Temple also had five surviving daughters:

- Jane Martha (1672-1751) who married firstly John Berkeley, 3rd Baron Berkeley of Stratton, and secondly William Bentinck, 1st Earl of Portland, and had issue by her second marriage. Her portrait was painted by Michael Dahl. On the accession of Queen Anne, who disliked her, she was forbidden the Court, but was restored to favour under George I, and became governess to the royal children.
- Frances (died 1707) who married Lord Berkeley's brother and heir William Berkeley, 4th Baron Berkeley of Stratton, and had issue: through her daughter Frances, Lady Byron, she was ancestor to the celebrated poet Lord Byron.
- Mary who married Thomas Flower of Durrow, County Laois and was the mother of William Flower, 1st Baron Castle Durrow. After her death Flower remarried the Welsh heiress, Dorothea Jeffreys of Abercynrig, daughter of Colonel John Jeffreys, first Master of the Royal Hospital Kilmainham, and widow of Arthur Turner (died 1684), justice of the Court of Common Pleas (Ireland).
- Catherine (died 1694), who married firstly Charles, only son of Sir Robert Ward, first and last of the Ward Baronets of Killagh, and secondly Charles King.
- Dorothy, who married Francis Colville, eldest son and heir of Sir Robert Colville of Newtownards by his first wife Penelope Rawdon. Francis died before his father in about 1683.

Legal offices
Preceded by Robert Shapcote	Solicitor General for Ireland; 1660-1689	Succeeded by Theobald Butler
Preceded by Richard Nagle; As Attorney-General for Ireland	Attorney-General for Williamite Ireland; 1690-1691	Succeeded by Himself; As Attorney-General for Ireland
Preceded by Richard Nagle; As Attorney-General for Jacobite Ireland	Attorney General for Ireland; 1691-1695	Succeeded by Robert Rochfort
Preceded by Himself; As Attorney-General for Williamite Ireland	Attorney General for Ireland; 1691-1695	Succeeded by Robert Rochfort
