= Francis Plowden (politician) =

English Jacobite politician, official, and courtier

The Right Honourable Francis Plowden PC (Ire)

Member of Parliament for Bannow
- In office 1689–1689 Serving with Alexius Stafford
- Preceded by: Dudley Loftus; Henry Warren
- Succeeded by: Nathaniel Boyse; John Cliffe

Personal details
- Born: c. 1644; Plowden, Shropshire
- Died: April 1712 (aged 67–68)
- Spouse: Mary Stafford-Howard (m. 1699; died 1712)
- Children: 3
- Parent(s): Edmund Plowden; Elizabeth Cotton

Francis Plowden (c. 1644 – April 1712) was an English Jacobite politician, official and courtier who rose to prominence while serving James II of England in Ireland.

== Early life ==
Plowden born in c. 1644 in Plowden, Shropshire to a Roman Catholic gentry family, he was the second son of Edmund Plowden and Elizabeth (née Cotton) of Plowden and Aston le Walls. Among his siblings was an elder brother, Edmund Plowden, who married Penelope Drummond (a daughter of Sir Maurice Drummond).

His paternal grandparents were Francis Plowden and Elizabeth Butler. His maternal grandfather was Richard Cotton, Esq. of Bedhampton, Hampshire.

== Career ==
Although his family had no previous connections to Ireland, by 1688 Plowden had settled in Galway and was a member of the city's council. On 11 August 1688, he was appointed a member of the Privy Council of Ireland.

Plowden adhered to James II following the Glorious Revolution and on 27 April 1689 he was appointed to the Irish revenue commission. In May 1689, he was elected as a Member of Parliament for Bannow in the short-lived Patriot Parliament summoned by James II in Dublin. Following the death of the Earl of Tyrconnell on 14 August 1691, Plowden was appointed a Lord Justice of Ireland alongside Richard Nagle and Alexander Fitton, tasked with acting on James II's behalf while he was outside Ireland. The remaining Jacobite territory overseen by the Lords Justices was minimal, and the Williamite War in Ireland ended on 3 October 1691 with the Treaty of Limerick.

=== Life in exile ===
He left Ireland for France on 22 December 1691 and joined the exiled Jacobite court at Château de Saint-Germain-en-Laye. In 1695, Plowden was appointed governor to James Francis Edward Stuart, the titular Prince of Wales. In 1700, he was made Comptroller of the Household to James II and from 1701 held the same position for Mary of Modena.

== Personal life ==
On 1 October 1699 he had married Mary Stafford-Howard (d. 1765), eldest daughter of Hon. John Stafford-Howard and Mary Southcote (a daughter of Sir John Southcote). Among her extended family were grandparents William Howard, 1st Viscount Stafford and Mary Howard, Countess of Stafford, and brother, William Stafford-Howard, 2nd Earl of Stafford. Together they had a son and two daughters:

- Marie Françoise Plowden (1704–1785), who married Sir George Jerningham, 5th Baronet, son of Sir Francis Jerningham, 3rd Baronet, in 1733.
- Louise Anne Plowden (1705–1784), who died unmarried.
- Francis Plowden (1707–1788), who became a Roman Catholic priest.

He died in April 1712 and was buried at Saint-Germain-en-Laye.

=== Descendants ===
Through his daughter Marie, his only child to have issue, he was a grandfather of Sir William Jerningham, 6th Baronet (1736–1809), who would have been 7th Baron Stafford but for the attainder, which was reversed in 1824; he married Frances Dillon, daughter of the 11th Viscount Dillon and Lady Charlotte Lee (a daughter of the 2nd Earl of Lichfield).

Parliament of Ireland
Preceded by Dudley Loftus; Henry Warren	Member of Parliament for Bannow; 1689; With: Alexius Stafford	Succeeded by Nathaniel Boyse; John Cliffe
