= Charles Stewart (Royal Navy officer) =

Royal Navy admiral (1981–1741)

Vice-Admiral The Honourable Charles Stewart
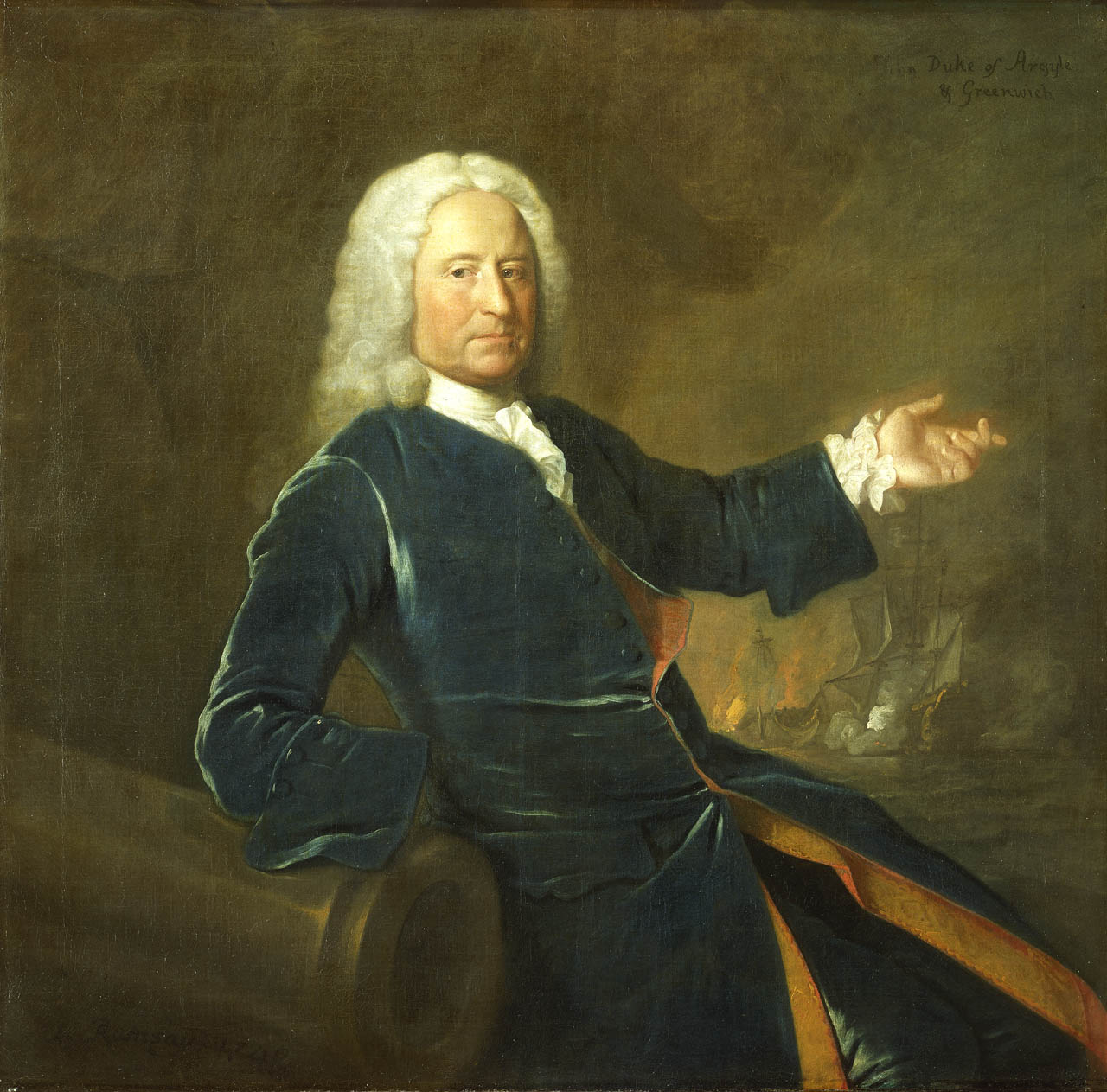
- Stewart in 1740
- Born: 1681
- Died: 5 February 1741 (aged 59–60)
- Relatives: William Stewart, 1st Viscount Mountjoy (father)
- Military career
- Allegiance: Kingdom of England; Kingdom of Great Britain
- Branch: Royal Navy
- Service years: c. 1697–1741
- Rank: Vice-Admiral of the White
- Commands: HMS Falcon; HMS Panther
- Conflicts: Nine Years' War; War of the Spanish Succession; War of the Quadruple Alliance; Anglo-Spanish War; War of the Austrian Succession

Vice-Admiral Charles Stewart (1681 – 5 February 1741) was an officer of the Royal Navy who saw service during the Nine Years' War, and the Wars of the Spanish Succession, Quadruple Alliance and Austrian Succession. He embarked on a political career, and was a Member of Parliament for the Parliaments of Ireland and Great Britain.

Stewart was born into the nobility, raised the younger son of a viscount. He entered the navy at an early age, but suffered a severe wound at the beginning of his career, losing his right hand. He recovered, and prospered in the service, rising to command several ships in the frequent wars of the early eighteenth century. He also had an interest in politics, representing County Tyrone from 1715. By 1720 he had risen high enough in the navy to be entrusted with a squadron to take action against Mediterranean piracy, particularly the dangerous Salé Rovers. He had the dual commission of acting as minister plenipotentiary to Morocco, and managed to successfully negotiate a treaty and the release of 296 British prisoners.

Rewarded with an increased pension and further commands, Stewart was raised to flag rank and served for a time as commander in chief in the West Indies, and held junior commands in the Channel Fleet. He also sat for the British parliament, representing Malmesbury from 1723 until 1727, and Portsmouth from 1737 until his death in 1741.

== Family and early career ==
Charles Stewart was born in 1681, the fifth son of Sir William Stewart later 1st Viscount Mountjoy. His mother was Mary, the eldest daughter of Richard Coote, 1st Baron Coote. Charles entered the navy at an early age, and was involved in the Nine Years' War. In 1697, at the age of 16, his ship was involved in an engagement with a French warship off Dover, and Stewart was injured, losing his right hand. He was granted a pension of £100 for his injury in 1699. Recovering from the injury, he continued in the service and was promoted to lieutenant. He served on several ships at this rank until being promoted to captain and given command of the frigate HMS Falcon on 1 December 1704. After some time in command of this ship, he was transferred to the 50-gun HMS Panther and served in the Mediterranean under Sir John Leake. He was one of the officers involved in the court-martial of Sir Thomas Hardy in October 1707, aboard HMS Albemarle at Portsmouth.^{[a]}

== Parliament and commands ==
Stewart combined a naval career with a political one, at first entering the Parliament of Ireland in October 1715, representing County Tyrone. After some years in the navy, he was assigned to command a squadron in the Mediterranean in 1720 against the Salé Rovers. Combined with this task was the appointment as minister plenipotentiary to Morocco, with orders to secure a peace treaty with the emperor, Ismail Ibn Sharif.

=== Embassy to Morocco ===
Stewart sailed from England on 24 September, making his way to Tétouan via Gibraltar. Arriving at Tétouan on 22 December, he negotiated a treaty with the pasha and the articles were exchanged on 17 January 1721. He then travelled on to Mequinez, arriving on 3 July 1721 and meeting the emperor in an audience on 6 July. The articles of the treaty were exchanged, with Abdelkader Perez, a Moroccan admiral and later ambassador to Britain, assisting negotiations. The emperor then presented Stewart with a gift of nine Christian slaves. A second meeting took place on 23 July, at which all the captured Englishmen held as slaves, 296 in total, were released. After exchanging messages of friendship and goodwill, Stewart left Mequinez on 27 July and arrived back at Tétouan on 12 August. He then returned to Britain with the former captives. His success on these occasions was rewarded with the increase of his annual pension to £300, on 14 December 1724.

=== Politics and flag rank ===
Stewart apparently became a supporter of John Campbell, 2nd Duke of Argyll, and was elected to represent Malmesbury on his interest, on 25 January 1723. He represented Malmesbury until 1727, and though Sir Charles Wager expected that Argyll would arrange for Stewart to be elected to represent Portsmouth in 1732, this did not happen. Stewart's next opportunity to distinguish himself at sea came in late 1729, towards the end of the Anglo-Spanish War. News arrived in England that Edward St Lo, commander in chief at the Jamaica Station during the Blockade of Porto Bello, had died while in command. Stewart was promoted to rear-admiral of the blue on 9 December 1729 and set out to take up the command in Lo's stead, flying his flag aboard HMS Lion.

He was commander in chief until 1732, being promoted to rear-admiral of the white on 29 June 1732. He was promoted again, to vice-admiral of the blue, on 26 February 1734, and given command of a division of a fleet being prepared for sea to counter Spanish threats. Stewart duly hoisted his flag aboard the 80-gun HMS Devonshire, but the crisis passed without breaking into war. He then became second in command of the Channel Fleet, under Sir John Norris, flying his flag aboard the 70-gun HMS Edinburgh, but again without seeing any action.

== Later life ==
Stewart continued to serve in the navy and receive promotions. He was raised to the rank of vice-admiral of the white on 2 March 1736. He also resumed his parliamentary career, being returned to represent Portsmouth at a by-election on 10 February 1737. He held this seat until his death on 5 February 1741, voting against the Convention of Pardo in 1739, but for the place bill of 1740. He died unmarried.

== Notes ==
a. In the summer of 1706 Hardy had been given command of a small squadron assigned to escort a convoy of 200 merchants to Lisbon. They had encountered a French squadron of six warships off the Lizard on 27 August, but Hardy decided that he would not be able to catch them, had concentrated on keeping the convoy together, and had escorted it to the prescribed distance of 120 leagues in line with his orders. His failure to pursue the French squadron later resulted in him being charged with neglect of duty, but he was fully acquitted at the court-martial, with the observation that he had "complied with the lord high admiral's orders, both with regard to chasing the enemy and also the protecting the trade." Hardy continued into the service and rose to flag rank.

== Citations ==
Military offices
| Preceded by William Smith | Commander-in-Chief, Jamaica Station; 1730–1732 | Succeeded by Richard Lestock |
Parliament of Ireland
| Preceded by Richard Stewart; Audley Mervyn | Member of Parliament for County Tyrone; 1715–1727; With: Audley Mervyn (1715–1717); Audley Mervyn (1717–1727) | Succeeded by Richard Stewart; Henry Mervyn |
Parliament of Great Britain
| Preceded by Giles Earle; John Fermor | Member of Parliament for Malmesbury; 1723–1727; With: Giles Earle | Succeeded by Giles Earle; William Rawlinson Earle |
| Preceded by Thomas Lewis; Philip Cavendish | Member of Parliament for Portsmouth; 1737–1741; With: Philip Cavendish | Succeeded by Giles Earle; Edward Vernon |
