= Alexius Stafford =

Irish Roman Catholic priest

Alexius Stafford (c.1648 – 1691) was an Irish Roman Catholic priest and politician, who served as Dean of Christ Church Cathedral, Dublin from 1688 to 1691.

== Biography ==
Stafford was born in County Wexford to an Old English family. He trained as a priest in the Irish College at Lisbon and was ordained in 1675. He then returned to Ireland to minister in his native Wexford. In September 1682 Stafford was present in London as a 'missioner', though he returned to Ireland in the 1680s. He was nominated as the Dean of Christ Church Cathedral, Dublin in March 1688 by King James II, who also gave Stafford a pension of £40. In September 1686 he was also appointed chaplain to the Royal Irish Regiment of Foot Guards. On 9 March 1688 he was appointed a master of the Court of Chancery, although the appointment of a priest to the role was criticised by William King.

Stafford adhered to James following the Glorious Revolution and he was selected as the Member of Parliament for Bannow in the short-lived Patriot Parliament of 1689. In October 1689, Stafford took up his position in Christ Church following the reconsecration of the cathedral for Catholic worship in September and the flight of the incumbent dean, William Moreton. The legitimacy of the appointment was the subject of a legal challenge by the Anglican priest Michael Jephson. Stafford regularly presided over services attended by King James and was noted for his zeal, being highly regarded by contemporaries for both his personal qualities and ability. He fled Christ Church following the Battle of the Boyne in 1690, just eight months after his formal appointment to the cathedral. He was present at the Battle of Aughrim on 12 July 1691 in his capacity as chaplain to the royal regiment. He was killed at the outset of the battle, while encouraging the first charge of the regiment from the front.

Parliament of Ireland
Preceded by Dudley Loftus; Henry Warren	Member of Parliament for Bannow; 1689; With: Francis Plowden	Succeeded by Nathaniel Boyse; John Cliffe
