= Trillick =

Village in County Tyrone, Northern Ireland

Coordinates: 54.462°N 7.486°W

Trillick: Irish: Trileac
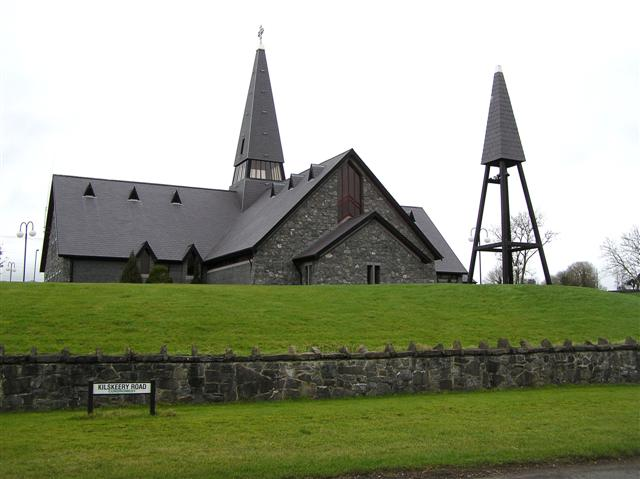
- St Macartan's Roman Catholic church, Trillick

- Location within Northern Ireland
- Population: 996 (UK 2011 census)
- District: Omagh
- County: County Tyrone
- Country: Northern Ireland
- Sovereign state: United Kingdom
- Post town: OMAGH
- Postcode district: BT78
- Dialling code: 028
- UK Parliament: West Tyrone
- NI Assembly: West Tyrone

Trillick (from Irish Trileac, meaning 'three flagstones') is a small village in County Tyrone, Northern Ireland. It had a population of 2,439 people in the 2011 census. Trillick is in the civil parish of Kilskeery and the barony of Omagh East. It is located within both the Roman Catholic Diocese of Clogher and Church of Ireland Diocese of Clogher.

== History ==
=== Early history ===
Trillick Trí Leac (in Irish) "three stones", is another term for a chambered tomb. The village is named from a ruined example beside Trillick Castle. The name is referred to in early records as Trelic and Trelic Mor, taking that name from the three pillars or standing stones located at what was the original Trelic and now generally referred to as the Old Castle. After 4,000 years, the three pillar stones and a stone doorway facing the rising sun, can be seen. It is believed to be a settlement of the Beaker people, who came from the Netherlands to Britain and then to Ulster around 2,000 B.C. They were skilled in making decorative gold, copper and metal objects and the gold lunula preserved in the National Museum of Ireland in Dublin is proof of their presence and activities here.

The name of Trillick has been preserved through 4,000 years of history. Records show that the Celts had a major base here and, on being converted to Christianity, had established an Abbey at Trelic Mor by 613 A.D. Various records refer to St. Mobec of Trelic, whose commemoration or feast day is on 29 May. The Annals of the Four Masters record the death of Cinead Ó Ceallaigh, Bishop of Trelic, in 813 A.D. The O'Neill clan had a strong fort here, with their soldiers based at nearby Dernagilly. They fought the famous battle of Dreigh Hill in 1379 against the Maguires and won a victory which settled the Tyrone/Fermanagh county boundary here. The Annals record the death in 1526 of Henry O'Neill, Lord of the Braghaid, the name given to the territory ruled by the O'Neills from Old Trielic. Henry was a grandson of Shane O'Neill ("Shane the Proud"), and his own grandson, Con (died 1723), has a headstone in the old Kilskeery graveyard. The Civil Survey of 1654 says that the remains of a village, church, burial ground and mill could still be seen at Old Trelic but, by then, the new town of Trillick had been built.

After the Flight of the Earls from Lough Swilly on 4 September 1607, and the division of their escheated lands, the O’Neill territory here was given the description of the Manor of Stowy and allotted to Sir Mervyn Tuchet in 1611 during the Plantation of Ulster. He passed them on to his cousin, Sir Henry Mervyn of Hampshire, who in turn passed them on to his son, Captain James Mervyn. He arrived here around 1620, began building a castle which was completed in 1628 and the new town of Trillick was completed in the 1630s. The castle was described as one of the best of its kind and was occupied up until the 19th century, being vacant in 1814. It had then passed to General Mervyn Archdale, who built the hunting lodge at Glengeen. The Mervyns were noted parliamentarians, holding the Tyrone seat in Parliament from 1639 to 1747 and Captain Audley Mervyn being Speaker of the Irish Parliament from 1661 to 1666.

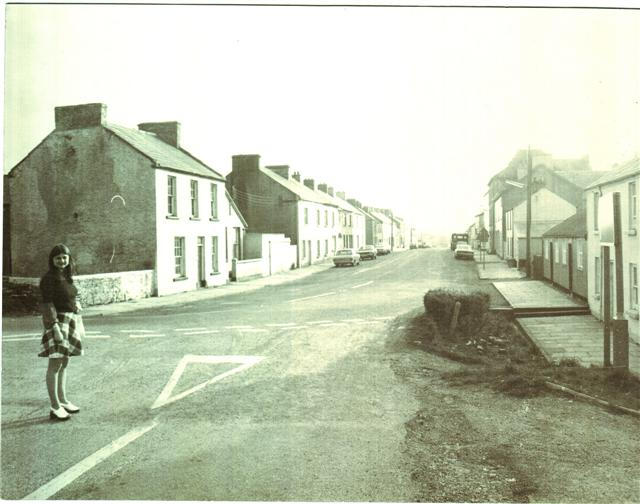
Main Street, Trillick (July 1972)

The new town lost no time in writing its name into history. Being on the direct route from Dublin to Derry and within striking distance of the strong Enniskilling base at Enniskillen, Trillick became an important post during the Jacobite wars. From 1629, the planters were being trained in the use of firearms by Charles Bastard of Drumdran, while the natives, including members of the O'Neill clan on the run, were being trained by agents of Phelim O'Neill of Caledon. In 1641 O'Neill had garrisons at Golan and Liffer, while the planters had garrisons at Castle and Corkhill. Both sides had victories over the other here in 1641 and both sides were strengthened in 1642, when General Munroe arrived to bolster the royalist forces and Eoghan Ruadh Uí Néill came to lead the Irish insurrection. In 1689 the Jacobite garrison here was for a time under the command of King James' son, the Duke of Berwick. After lifting the siege of Derry, King William's army billeted at Trillick on its way back to Enniskillen in August 1689.

=== 20th century ===
On 21–22 March 1922, during the Irish War of Independence, Irish Republican Army members shot dead two Royal Irish Constabulary officers in the Trillick area. In reprisal, local loyalists shot dead three Catholic civilians in the area.

== Buildings of note ==
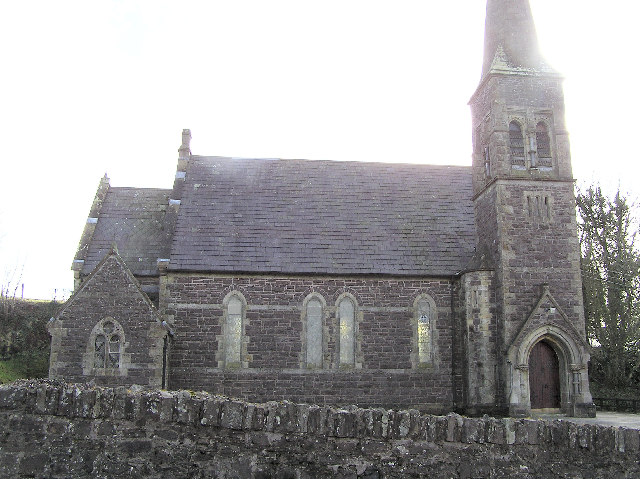
Christ Church (Church of Ireland)

- Trillick Market House, built c. 1820, is in use as a Masonic Hall.
- Christ Church, the Church of Ireland parish church

== Notable natives ==
- Sir Audley Mervyn of Trillick - Speaker of the Irish Parliament.

== See also ==
- The Troubles in Trillick
