= Theobald Butler (solicitor-general) =

Irish politician

Sir Theobald (Toby) Butler (1650–1721) was a leading barrister and politician in late seventeenth-century Ireland, who held office as Solicitor General for Ireland. He is mainly remembered for framing the civil articles of the Treaty of Limerick, and for his eloquent but unsuccessful plea to the Irish House of Commons against the passing of the Popery Act 1704 (2 Anne c. 6 (I)), which allowed any Protestant son of a Roman Catholic landowner to prevent his Catholic brothers from inheriting the family property. He was a much loved "character" in Dublin, and his great popularity shielded him from the penalties that he might otherwise have suffered as a result of his religious beliefs. Only his few enemies attacked him for his willingness to come to an accommodation with the new regime in order to preserve his own property.

== Family ==
He was born at Boytonrath, County Tipperary, second of the five sons of James and Mary Butler, who were distant cousins. The various branches of the Butler dynasty were much intermarried: James belonged to the branch of the family which was headed by Baron Dunboyne, while Mary was probably a granddaughter of Walter Butler, 11th Earl of Ormonde. In the turmoil following the Irish Rebellion of 1641 the family lost possession of their Boytonrath estate, and Toby's maternal grandfather, another James Butler, who was a staunch opponent of the Cromwellian regime, was hanged for murder on trumped up charges in 1653 (it appears that he was not accused of murder himself, but of responsibility for crimes committed by soldiers under his command). The family settled at Ballyline near Ennis, County Clare, where Toby grew up.

== Barrister ==
He entered the Inner Temple in 1671, and was called to the Irish Bar in 1676. He practised at first on the Connaught Circuit, then settled in Dublin, where he spent the rest of his life. His principal estate was at Saggart in County Dublin; he also had a townhouse at Nicholas Street in Dublin city.

He was described as an "acute and artful lawyer" and one of the best advocates of his age. He was also famous for his wit. After the Glorious Revolution, according to a well-known story, a judge of questionable political loyalties said that Butler's shirt cuffs were dirty; Butler silenced him with the retort: but my hands are clean. Even by the standards of the Irish Bar, he was a heavy drinker: another well-known story relates that he accepted a plea from the Court not to drink wine until he had finished his argument; but later admitted that he had cheated by eating bread soaked in wine. He was a well-known "character" who regularly frequented the taverns of Dublin, especially in the rather unsavoury district called "Hell", adjoining Christ Church Cathedral. He could be quarrelsome when drunk, and in 1693 was reprimanded for assaulting another barrister, Nicholas Fitzgerald, whom he accused, on no apparent evidence, of trying to murder him, after an all-night drinking session in Waterford.

== Politician ==
Following the arrival in Ireland of King James II, who landed at Kinsale in March 1689, Butler, who was loyal to James and a devout Roman Catholic, became for a short time a figure of some political importance. He sat in the Patriot Parliament as MP for Ennis, and was knighted. He was briefly Third Serjeant and Solicitor General, Recorder of Clonmel, second justice of the Palatine Court of Tipperary, and a Commissioner of the Revenue, and he sat on a Commission to examine the validity of Royal Charters.

== Treaty of Limerick ==
After the downfall of James II's cause, Butler played a key role in drawing up the civil articles of the Treaty of Limerick, which were intended as a permanent settlement of Ireland's political problems; he was assisted by two other prominent Catholic barristers, John Browne and Garrett Dillon. While he has been criticised for his alleged lack of attention to points of detail, in fact, the terms which he obtained were remarkably generous to the defeated side, and are a tribute to his political and legal skills. Catholic landowners (and those Protestants who had supported the Jacobite cause) who declared their loyalty to King William III were not to suffer any penalties, and would retain their lands and the right to keep and bear arms. Unfortunately for the Catholic landowners, it quickly became clear that the dominant faction in the Parliament of Ireland did not intend to honour the Treaty: after weeks of acrimonious debate Parliament was prorogued and the issue of ratification was dropped for good.

== After the Treaty ==
Butler returned to his practice at the Bar, and his practice flourished through the 1690s. How he was able to continue in practice after 1700, as it seems he did, is unclear, since the new Penal Laws barred Catholics from the legal profession. His position may have been strengthened by his friendship with leading Protestant barristers like Sir Richard Levinge, 1st Baronet, a fellow student in the Inner Temple and his successor as Solicitor-General, and Sir John Meade, 1st Baronet, like Butler a former judge of the Palatine.

It is just possible that he converted to Protestantism: Jonathan Swift, the Anglican Dean of St. Patrick's Cathedral, Dublin, and a close friend of Butler, later said that Butler was "one of his flock" at St Patrick's Cathedral. It became increasingly common for well-to-do Catholics (often known by the pejorative term "Castle Catholics"), in order to safeguard their families and their property, to conform outwardly to the Church of Ireland. One of the few attacks on him (after his death) suggests that those Catholics who were completely unreconciled to the new regime did regard him as a turncoat. Against that, Butler's speech to the Commons in 1703 is that of an open and passionate Roman Catholic (his eldest son James did conform to the Established Church, despite claims by informers to the contrary).

While his loyalty to King James II was not in doubt, he never seems to have contemplated joining the King in exile, as his colleague Garrett Dillon did, nor was any pressure put on him to do so. He was protected by his great popularity, and by the fact that the Butlers were still a powerful clan politically; the Ormonde Butlers, the senior branch of the family, had safeguarded their position by supporting the Glorious Revolution, although they later turned Jacobite.

== Popery Act ==
As the eighteenth century began, the legal position of Roman Catholics steadily worsened, and in 1703 a Bill "to prevent the further growth of Popery" was introduced in the House of Commons. It provided that when a Catholic landowner died his sons would share the land equally, unless one of them became a Protestant, in which case he would inherit the whole estate. Butler as a Catholic was now ineligible to sit in the House of Commons, but he was permitted to make an address from the bar of the House on 22 February. His speech was justly celebrated for its eloquence:

Is this not against the laws of God and man? Against the rules of reason and justice by which all men ought to be governed? .... For God's sake gentlemen, will you consider whether this is according to the golden rule, to do as you would be done by? ... surely you will not, nay you cannot, take from us our birthrights.

He repeated his plea to the House of Lords a few days later, but both Houses of Parliament, entirely unmoved, duly passed the Popery Act.

== Later years ==
As a Catholic landowner, Butler was now liable to harassment by informers or "discoverers" who would bring collusive lawsuits to challenge the landowner's title to his estates. Sir Toby took the common precaution of conveying his lands to Protestant friends in trust for his sons; his eldest son's public adherence to the Church of Ireland was another safeguard, and much of the property remained in the family, despite the claim in a later lawsuit that the eldest son was "a Papist like his father ". During his later years Sir Toby was troubled by a lawsuit over his Saggart estate, brought by the informer John Brenan, and another over certain lands in County Galway, which was brought against him by Penelope, Lady Prendergast, widow of Sir Thomas Prendergast. The case reached the House of Lords in 1720, but was not concluded there: it went on for 40 years, long after Sir Toby's death. Lady Prendergast was a determined litigant who was involved in numerous lawsuits in her later years, although it is fair to say that her aim was not greed, but a wish to safeguard her son's inheritance.

== Death and reputation ==
He died in March 1721 and was buried in the churchyard of St James' Church in Dublin city. His burial in a Protestant churchyard may simply be a tribute to his almost universal popularity; on the other hand it may be evidence that he did occasionally attend Church of Ireland services. His memorial, which still exists, and was restored by his descendants in the 1870s, has a very simple Latin inscription by his eldest son James praising "the best of fathers".

This high opinion of Butler seems to have been generally shared: Jonathan Swift called him a man who was "universally beloved". One of the few dissenting voices, speaking for those embittered Catholics who had lost everything under the new regime, said that he deserved a place in Purgatory, along with the notably accommodating judge Denis Daly, who had also recently died.

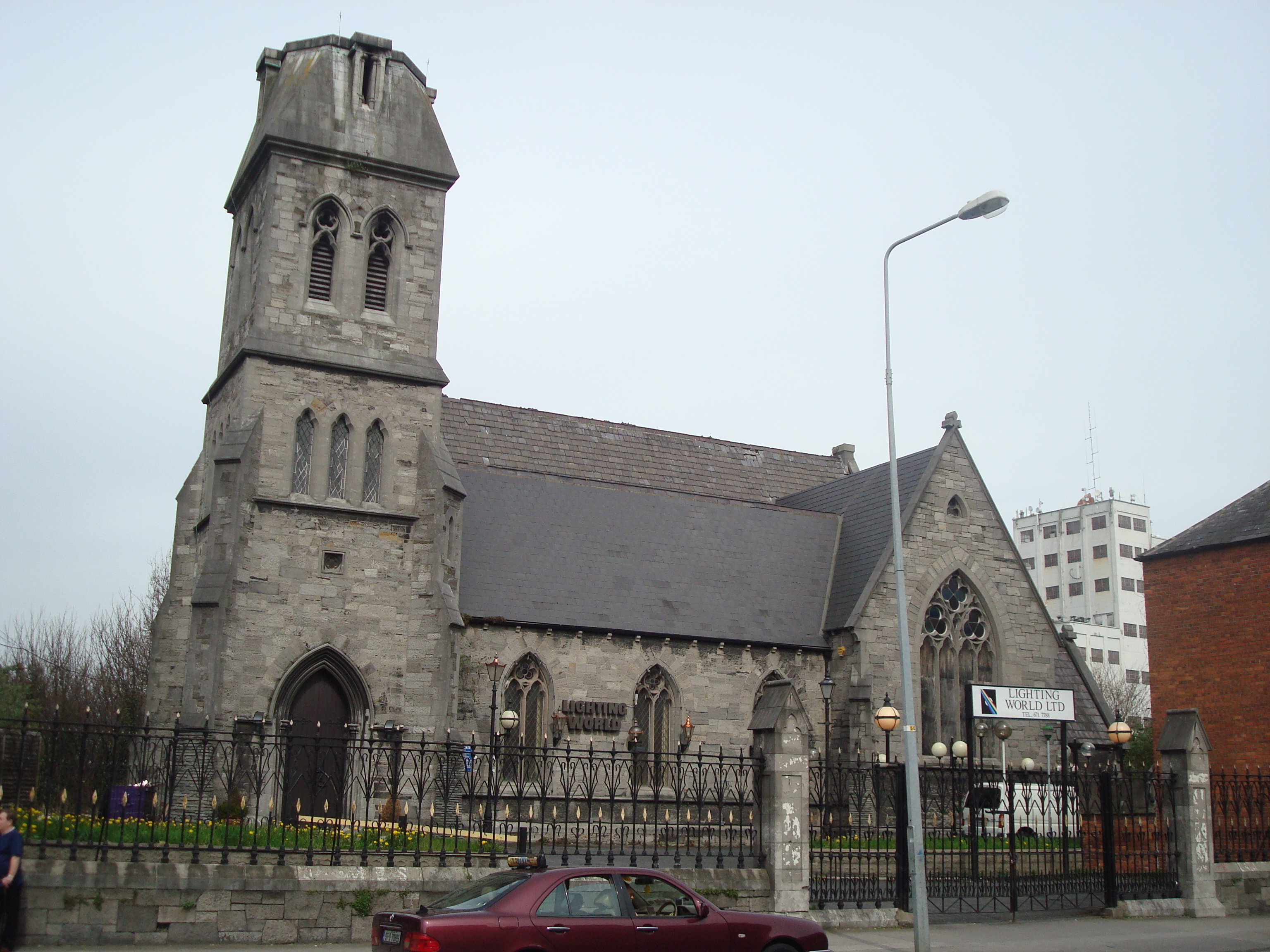
St James Church, where the memorial to Butler still exists.

== Marriage and children ==
He married Margaret Roche, daughter of Dominick Roche, Mayor of Limerick, on whom James II during his time in Ireland conferred the titles Viscount Cahiravahilla and Baron Tarbert, and his wife Agnes Burke of Cahirmichael. They had at least five sons – James, John (the owner of Ballymount House in South Dublin), Theobald, Jordan and Henry – and a daughter Frances, who married her cousin Thomas Butler, 6th Baron Cahir.

Legal offices
Preceded by John Temple	Solicitor General for Ireland; 1689	Succeeded by Sir Richard Levinge
