= Viscount Cahiravahilla =

Viscount Cahiravahilla was a Jacobite peerage created by King James II of England for Dominick Roche, Mayor of Limerick, in 1689. He was also created Baron Tarbert.

After the downfall of James's cause, Roche was apparently left in possession of his estates; his male descendants seem to have simply let the title lapse.

His daughter Margaret married Sir Toby Butler; they had five sons and a daughter.
