= Charles Porter (Lord Chancellor of Ireland) =

English-born politician and judge

Sir Charles Porter (c. 1630 – 8 December 1696) was a flamboyant and somewhat controversial English-born politician and judge, who nonetheless enjoyed a highly successful career in Ireland.

He sat in the English House of Commons, and was twice Lord Chancellor of Ireland. As Lord Chancellor, he survived an attempt by his political enemies to remove him through impeachment, and defeated their attempts to persuade the English Crown to remove him from office. In the last months of his life, he was effectively the head of the Irish government. In his dealings with the Irish people, he was noted for tolerance in religious matters.

He was a heavy drinker and reputedly something of a womaniser, and was chronically short of money, despite having married a wealthy heiress as his second wife. Nonetheless, as a lawyer, he was considered to be entirely honest, and he did not take bribes. Although he had his critics, he was described by his friends as "a man who had the good fortune to be universally beloved".

== Early life ==
Porter was born in Norwich, a younger son of Edmund Porter (died 1670), prebendary of Norwich and chaplain to Thomas Coventry, 1st Baron Coventry. His mother was Mary (or Mawry), daughter of the eminent barrister and politician Sir Charles Chiborne (died 1619) of Messing Hall, Essex, and his first wife Jane Spilman, daughter of Thomas Spilman of Great Chart, Kent.

Much of what we know of his early life comes from his own colourful later account, given to his friend Roger North, which North believed to be largely true. During the Second English Civil War, while he was an apprentice, he took part on the Royalist side in the serious rioting in Norwich in 1648. He was pursued by a troop of Parliamentary soldiers, and escaped by seizing a child and pretending to carry it to safety. He fled to Yarmouth and took ship for Amsterdam; he first trained as a soldier, then ran a tavern. After about five years he judged it safe to return home (his enemies said that he had no choice, as his business had failed).

He decided on a career in the law, perhaps recalling the great success of his grandfather Sir Charles Chiborne in that field. He entered Middle Temple in 1656 and was called to the Bar in 1663. His critics said that he was a poor lawyer, and his addiction to all forms of pleasure, especially drink, undoubtedly hampered his practice. On the other hand, he was a hard worker, had a good knowledge of legal procedures and was a superb orator. Early in his career, he acquired the reputation of a man who had "the courage of his convictions". As counsel in Crispe v Dalmahoy (1675), one of several controversial cases on the claims of both Houses of Parliament to act as judges, Porter insisted on his right to argue against the alleged judicial powers of the House of Commons, even under threat of imprisonment for contempt of Parliament; in the event, he was sent to the Tower of London, but released after a few days. He attracted the favourable notice of several judges, especially Francis North, 1st Baron Guildford, who became a close friend of Porter and described him as "a man who had the good fortune to be universally loved". During the last years of Charles II, with Guildford, now Lord Keeper of the Great Seal, at the head of the judiciary, Porter was at the height of his professional success, and entered Parliament as member for Tregony in 1685. His earnings have been estimated at £1500 a year, which is reflected in the salary agreed for him as Lord Chancellor.

== Lord Chancellor of Ireland ==
Ever since the Restoration of 1660, there had been great difficulty in finding a suitable Irish Lord Chancellor: Michael Boyle, Archbishop of Armagh, held the office for twenty years simply because no professional judge was prepared to do so. Boyle, despite his lack of legal training, was a conscientious and incorruptible judge, but in old age, his mental and physical powers undoubtedly declined. Despite the objections of the Lord Lieutenant, Henry Hyde, 2nd Earl of Clarendon, who was a good friend of Boyle, it was decided to replace him with Porter, who was knighted and appointed Lord Chancellor in April 1686, with a generous salary of £1500 to compensate for the loss of his private practice. He was careful to show every mark of respect and goodwill towards the aged Archbishop Boyle. Clarendon, despite his initial objections, quickly came to like and admire Porter, whom he described as that rarest of beings, an honest lawyer. Clarendon's high opinion of Porter as a judge seems to have been generally shared. Clarendon's letters are the main source of information for Porter's first term as Lord Chancellor.

Porter soon found himself in difficulty on the issue of religion: as his later career would show he was by no means hostile to Roman Catholics, and was indeed in favour of a considerable degree of religious toleration for members of that faith. When the King first confided to Porter his plan to admit Catholics to public office, he did not object to the policy of allowing the admission of a limited number of Catholics into the Government. Porter appears to have been the only member of the Dublin administration in whom the King confided, which suggests that James initially trusted him. However Porter strongly objected to the policy of wholesale replacement of Protestant office-holders by Catholics, and this rapidly undermined his credit with James II. Porter quarrelled violently with the Duke of Tyrconnel, the effective leader of the Irish Catholics, and soon-to-be Lord Deputy of Ireland. Tyrconnel, true to his nickname of "Lying Dick Talbot", falsely accused him of taking bribes, and he was dismissed from office early in 1687, much to the regret of the Irish public, which trusted and respected him. He demanded an interview with the King, which James grudgingly granted, and demanded to know the reason for his dismissal. James would reply only that it was entirely his own fault. Porter responded to the charge of bribery by claiming that it was Tyrconnell who had tried to bribe him.

He returned to his practice at the Bar in England, but this did not flourish, and he was said to have been reduced to a condition of near poverty, despite the fortune which his second wife Letitia Coxeter had brought him on their marriage in 1671. His fortunes were restored by the Revolution of 1688, of which he was an early and strong supporter. He was appointed King's Counsel, entered the House of Commons as member for Windsor in 1690, and later that year, after William III had overcome his opponents in Ireland, was reappointed Lord Chancellor of Ireland.

== Lord Chancellor-Second term ==
His second term as Chancellor, like his first, was plagued with political controversy. Ironically, having been removed from office for showing a lack of favour to Roman Catholics, he was now accused of excessive sympathy for their cause. In his capacity as Lord Justice of Ireland he signed the Treaty of Limerick, which gave generous terms of surrender to the defeated Catholic supporters of James II, promising them religious tolerance, security of property and a general pardon. Porter was determined to secure observance of the terms of the Treaty. This brought him into conflict with most other members of the Dublin administration, although he had a strong ally in Sir Richard Cox, himself a future Lord Chancellor. The conflict intensified after the appointment of Lord Capel as Lord Deputy. Porter's opponents, including Capel and Richard Coote, 1st Earl of Bellomont, were determined to have him removed, along with his ally Thomas Coningsby, 1st Earl Coningsby, the great difficulty being that King William III thought well of him. In 1693 matters came to a head when it was proposed to grant Porter a pardon: to his enemies, it was unthinkable that "the man who had destroyed a kingdom" should receive a pardon. As a result, he was charged by Bellomont and others with maladministration before the English House of Commons. Being still a member of the House, he attended the hearing in person and secured a favourable verdict, and also the royal pardon, proposed the previous year, for any acts of maladministration he might have committed.

== Impeachment ==
His enemies returned to the attack in 1695 when he was impeached by the Irish House of Commons for high crimes and misdemeanours; the articles, while including a reference to Jacobite sympathies, chiefly concerned his conduct as a judge and listed a series of alleged acts of corruption and abuse of office, as well as the familiar charges of "favouring Papists" and appointing Catholic magistrates. Porter was eloquently defended by among others Philip Savage, the Chancellor of the Exchequer of Ireland, and he was permitted to speak in his own defence. His speech was generally agreed to have been a masterpiece: unfortunately, no copy of it survives. We do know that Porter, who prided himself on his magnanimity, promised to bear no malice against his accusers. The House of Commons, most of whose members respected Porter and liked him personally, rejected the charges by a large majority. Why the impeachment was brought in the first place remains something of a mystery. Suspicion naturally pointed to Capel, the Lord Deputy, who was certainly no friend of Porter's. Capel however denied that he had any part in it, and it has been argued in his defence that stirring up trouble in this way would have done him no favours with the King, who admired Porter, and was resolved not to let either of the warring factions in the Irish government gain pre-eminence.

== Last years ==
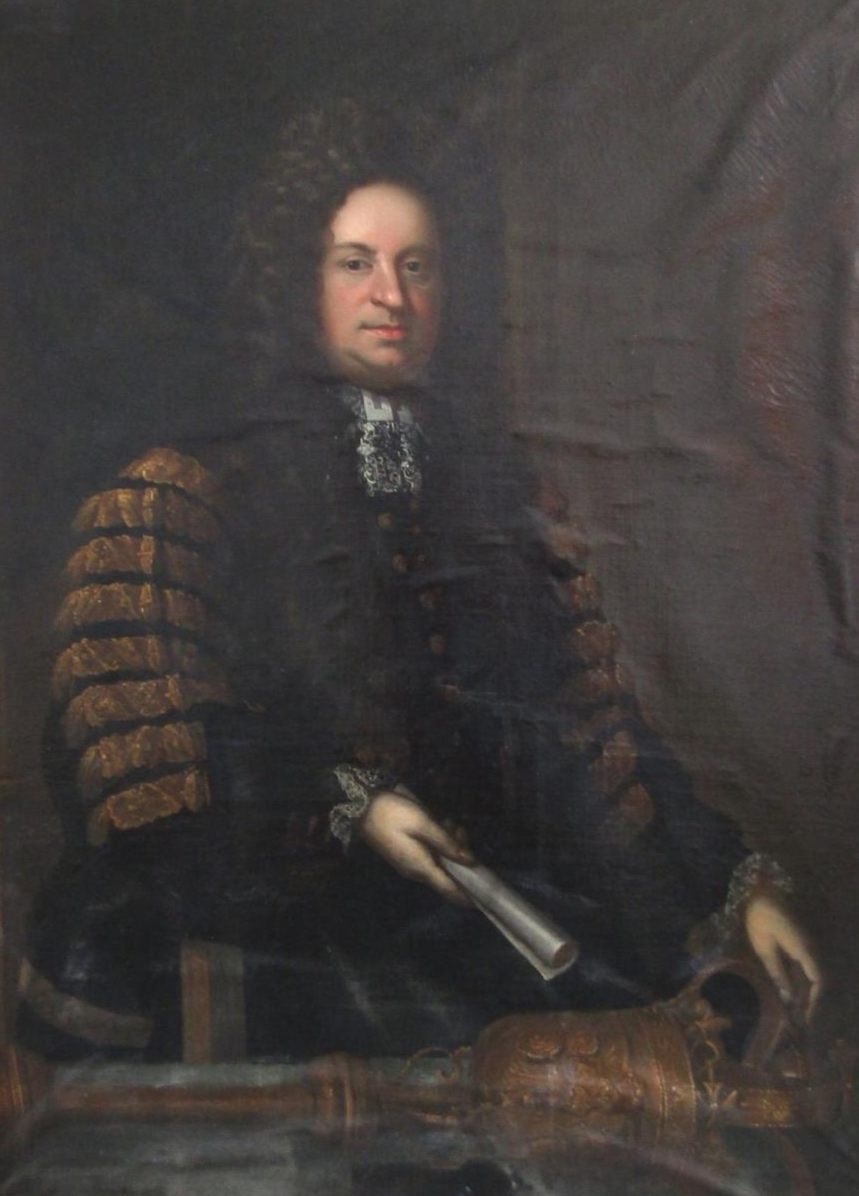
Robert Rochfort, one of Porter's foremost political opponents

On the night of his acquittal, Porter became involved in an altercation with Robert Rochfort, the Speaker of the House of Commons and an implacable political opponent, who was evidently furious at the failure of the impeachment. Seeing the Chancellor's coach trying to pull ahead of his own, Rochfort, who had a great sense of his own dignity, jumped down and tried to physically prevent Porter's coachman from going ahead of him. Porter sensibly stayed out of this quarrel, but the following day at his request the Lords sent a protest to the Commons, who replied that no insult had been intended, and that indeed the night was so dark that Rochfort had not recognised Porter (the streets of Dublin then were notoriously dark and badly lit). The matter was allowed to drop.

Porter tried so far as possible to counter what he regarded as Capel's aggressively Protestant policy. On the other hand, as regards the merits of their rival candidates for appointment to high office, there were arguments on both sides of the question, since it seems that Porter, no less than Capel, was anxious to secure as many important offices as possible for his friends and relatives. In 1695 Porter told Capel that he "could not bear it" if William Neave, the MP for Tulsk, a bitter political enemy who had been active in Porter's impeachment proceedings, were appointed Second Serjeant. Capel sharply retorted that he had allowed Porter to nominate his own protege, Sir Thomas Pakenham, as Prime Serjeant, as well as allowing Porter's own brother William to take silk. As regards Neave's role in the impeachment, Capel urged Porter, who was normally a magnanimous man, to forgive and forget, as he had already promised to do in his speech in his own defence. Neave was duly appointed Serjeant despite Porter's protests.

On Capel's death in the spring of 1696, Porter, appointed again as Lord Justice, was briefly at the head of the Irish administration: but on 8 December 1696, having been apparently in good health, he suddenly collapsed on returning to his chambers after leaving Court and died of an apparent stroke.

== Family ==
Porter married twice. His first wife was Sarah Mitchell of Middlesex, who died young. His second wife, whom he married in 1671, was Letitia Coxeter, daughter and co-heiress of Bartholomew Coxeter of Weald Manor, Bampton, Oxfordshire. He and Letitia, who died in 1692, had three children:

- Frederick, who married his cousin Mary Porter, but had no children.
- Elizabeth, who married firstly in 1698 Edward Devenish (died 1702) of Lincoln's Inn and then Rev John Moore, fourth son of Henry Hamilton-Moore, 3rd Earl of Drogheda, and had issue by both marriages.
- Letitia (1678–1721), who married George Macartney; the celebrated statesman George Macartney, 1st Earl Macartney, was their grandson.

His brother William (1633–1716) followed him to Ireland, was called to the Irish Bar and became King's Counsel in 1695. He sat in the Irish House of Commons as MP for Newtown Limavady 1695–99. They had at least one sister Elsie, who married John Miller. They were the ancestors of the Miller Baronets of County Clare.

Four years after Porter's death, Parliament passed a motion to protect the property rights of his children. This seems to confirm the general belief that Porter died in a condition of considerable poverty, although his second wife was a wealthy heiress.

He died at his house in Chancery Lane, Dublin.

== Character ==
Porter's strong opinions and his refusal to compromise on his principles made him numerous enemies in the political sphere; yet in private life, according to Lord Guildford, he was universally loved as a man who was witty, generous, hospitable and magnanimous. His antipathy to William Neave caused some adverse comments, in a man normally very willing to forgive his political enemies. His fondness for drink and other forms of pleasure undoubtedly damaged his career, although his hospitality increased his popularity in Dublin: one enemy sourly blamed the failure of his impeachment on his "dinner guests" in the Commons.

He was a success as Lord Chancellor of Ireland, having a reputation for integrity and impartiality – despite criticisms from his English counterpart, John Somers, 1st Baron Somers, who wrote brutally that his death was a blessing for all concerned, a view heartily shared by Charles Talbot, 1st Duke of Shrewsbury. Those of a contrary view included William III, who normally regarded his Ministers with a complete lack of human emotion, but who went so far as to say on Porter's death that he "was sorry for the loss of a good Chancellor", and, as a rare mark of his regard, arranged for a grant of land to Porter's impoverished daughters, later confirmed by Parliament. Despite his chronic need of money Porter prided himself on not taking bribes. The second Earl of Clarendon, who had a very low opinion of the legal profession in general, said that Porter and their mutual friend Roger North were "the only two honest lawyers I ever knew". North himself praised Porter's many good qualities, including magnanimity, self-control and the cheerfulness with which he endured misfortune.

Political offices
Preceded by Archbishop Michael Boyle	Lord Chancellor of Ireland; 1686–1687	Succeeded by Sir Alexander Fitton
Preceded by In commission Title last held by Sir Alexander Fitton	Lord Chancellor of Ireland; 1690–1696	Succeeded by In commission Title next held by John Methuen
