= Anthony Dopping (bishop of Ossory) =

Anthony Dopping (Dublin, 1675–1743) was the Anglican Bishop of Ossory.

He was born in Dublin, the second son of Anthony Dopping, Bishop of Meath, and educated at Trinity College, Dublin.

He was elected Dean of Clonmacnoise on 2 July 1720 and raised to the episcopacy as Bishop of Ossory on 19 July 1740.

He married Dorothea, the daughter of Ralph Howard, MD: they had a son, Anthony and four daughters.
