= Alexander Fitton =

Lord Chancellor of Ireland (1630?–1698)

Sir Alexander Fitton (c.1630–1698), sometimes known by his Jacobite title Baron Fitton of Gawsworth, was an Irish barrister and judge, who became Lord Chancellor of Ireland under James II of England, despite having spent many years in prison for a criminal offence.

== Family and early career ==
Fitton was the second son of William Fitton of Awrice (or Awne), County Limerick and his wife Eva Trevor, daughter of Sir Edward Trevor of Brynkynallt, Chirk, Denbighshire and Rostrevor, County Down, and his second wife Rose Ussher, daughter of Henry Ussher, Archbishop of Armagh. He was the great-grandson of Sir Edward Fitton, Vice-Treasurer of Ireland, who died in 1579. The Irish Fittons were a junior branch of the Fittons of Gawsworth Old Hall, Cheshire: Alexander was the grandson of another Alexander Fitton, who was Sir Edward's second son, and his wife Jane MacBryan O'Connogh. A lawsuit over the rightful ownership of Gawsworth was to preoccupy Alexander for most of his life. His mother's family later gained the title Viscount Dungannon.

He married Anne Joliffe, daughter of Thomas Joliffe (or Jolley) of Cofton Hall, Worcestershire and his first wife Margaret Skinner, and they had one surviving daughter, also called Anne. His wife was a considerable heiress, and as a result of the fortune she brought him Alexander was soon able to pay off the mortgage on the family's Limerick estates, which he inherited on the death of his brother Edward. Anne died in 1687, and was buried in St. Patrick's Cathedral, Dublin. Their daughter joined her father in exile in France. She married a Captain Miles McGrath, and died in 1700.

He entered Gray's Inn in 1654 and the Inner Temple in 1655; he was called to the Bar in 1662. Since he almost immediately became embroiled in the Gawsworth inheritance claim, it is unclear if he ever practised as a barrister, which later led to questions about his suitability for judicial office, quite apart from the obvious objection that he had spent much of his adult life in prison.

== Gawsworth inheritance claim ==
Sir Edward Fitton, 2nd Baronet, of Gawsworth, died in 1643 without issue; he had seven sisters, but the nearest male Fitton heir was Alexander's father William, Edward's second cousin. In 1641, Edward made a settlement creating an entail in favour of William and his male heirs, subject to the right of his widow Felicia to reside at Gawsworth for her lifetime. This was done over the vehement protests of Charles Gerard, son of Edward's eldest sister Penelope, who was the nearest heir by blood. After Edward's death, the Gerards tried to hold Gawsworth by force; but the fortunes of the English Civil War turned in the Fitton family's favour: as a staunch Royalist Gerard's own estates were forfeited and he left England about 1645, leaving the Fittons in possession until the Restoration.

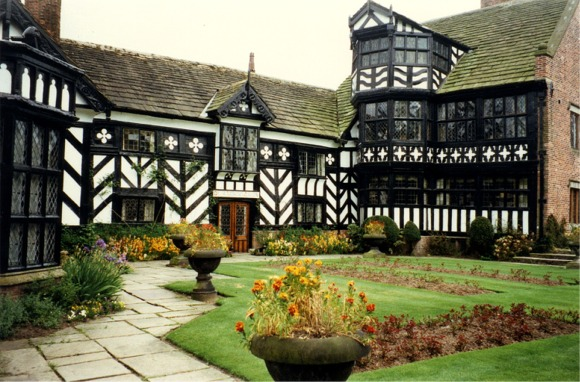
Gawsworth Old Hall. Fitton spent much of his life trying to prove his right to inherit it

By 1662 Gerard, now Baron Gerard of Brandon, had recovered his other estates and was in high favour at Court. Inevitably, he laid claim to Gawsworth, bringing a lawsuit in the Court of Chancery in which he exhibited a will supposedly made by Sir Edward Fitton just before his death bequeathing the property to Gerard. Alexander Fitton, rather than simply relying on the entail by which he succeeded as his father's heir, produced a deed which on the face of it made the settlement on his father irrevocable. Gerard then dramatically produced a notorious forger, Abraham Gowrie Granger, who testified that he had forged the deed on Fitton's behalf. The Court ordered a jury to find the facts; they found that the deed was indeed a forgery, and while Fitton managed to get a second hearing before a Cheshire jury, the result was the same. Lord Gerard duly took possession of Gawsworth.

Which party (if either) was legally or morally in the right it is now difficult to say; it is suspicious that both parties were relying on documents whose very existence had been previously unknown, and it is quite possible that both the will and the deed were forged. Fitton proceeded to make a serious mistake in publishing a pamphlet directly accusing Gerard of winning the case by bribing and threatening witnesses, and including what purported to be Granger's confession that he had committed perjury. Fitton was perhaps unaware that to libel a peer was scandalum magnatum, a criminal offence. The House of Lords took a serious view of the matter: Fitton was fined £500 and committed to the King's Bench Prison until if ever he produced Granger to contradict Gerard's allegations against Fitton. Given Granger's character, it is hardly surprising that Fitton never did produce him, and he might well have remained in prison for life. As it was (though accounts differ) he may still have been in prison in 1687. The petition to the House of Commons of England in 1668 which is mentioned in Pepys' Diary came to nothing, as did an attempt to prosecute Gerard's witnesses for perjury. The disgrace of Gerard, now Earl of Macclesfield, who supported the Exclusion Bill and was later suspected of complicity in the Monmouth Rebellion, encouraged Fitton to make one last effort to recover Gawsworth; his case was dismissed for undue delay. The affair however caused the new King James II to look favourably on Fitton.

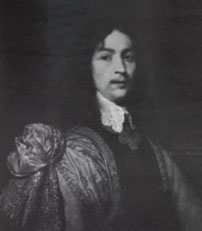
Charles Gerard, 1st Earl of Macclesfield, Fitton's cousin and lifelong enemy

== Lord Chancellor of Ireland ==
In 1687, the Irish Lord Chancellor Sir Charles Porter expressed reservations about the King's policy of religious toleration and was dismissed; while Richard Nagle, the Attorney General for Ireland, a Roman Catholic, put forward his own claim to the office, James was persuaded that Fitton, a Protestant, would be a better choice. Fitton thought it advisable nonetheless to convert to Catholicism. His salary was increased by £500 to £1500 per annum, and a once-off payment of £1250 from the secret service fund. He also received a knighthood. As Lord Chancellor, he was accused of ignorance, prejudice and bias against Protestants, although some historians have questioned the accuracy of these charges.

When King James II arrived in Ireland following the Glorious Revolution of 1688, Fitton presided over the Patriot Parliament of 1689; he was given a barony in the Jacobite peerage and chose the title Baron Fitton of Gawsworth. When James fled Ireland after the Battle of the Boyne, Fitton was appointed a Lord Justice of Ireland, alongside Francis Plowden and Richard Nagle, and acted on behalf of the King in his absence. The following year he joined James in France, although it is unclear if any proceedings were pending against him. He died at St. Germain without a male heir in 1698, at which point his Jacobite title became extinct.

== Character ==
Fitton has been judged harshly both by contemporaries and by later historians, especially Thomas Macaulay, who dismissed Fitton as a "pettifogger" without legal ability or commonsense, and unfit by reason of his imprisonment for libel and the strong suspicion that he was guilty of forgery as well to hold any office. William King, Archbishop of Dublin, who knew him personally, said that Fitton could not understand the merits of any difficult case, and so decided them all on the basis of his own prejudices. However O'Flanagan, writing in 1870, took a more favourable view, stating that he had examined Fitton's judicial decrees and found in them no evidence of ignorance or incapacity; on the contrary, they appeared to be the work of an experienced equity judge.

On the accusation of forgery, the safest view is that Gerard and Fitton were both guilty of it; Elrington Ball remarks that "bad as Fitton's character may have been, it can scarcely have been worse than that of Lord Gerard".

Political offices
Preceded by Sir Charles Porter	Lord Chancellor of Ireland; 1687–1690	Succeeded by In commission Title next held by Sir Charles Porter
Peerage of Ireland
New creation	— TITULAR — Baron Fitton of Gawsworth; Jacobite peerage 1689–1698	Extinct
