= William Domville =

Irish lawyer and politician

William Domville (or Domvile) (1609–1689) was a leading Irish politician, barrister and Constitutional writer of the Restoration era. Due to the great trust which the English Crown had in him, he served as Attorney General for Ireland throughout the reign of Charles II (1660-1685) and also served briefly in the following reign. It was during his term of office that the Attorney General emerged as the pre-eminent legal adviser to the Crown in Ireland.

While Domville was undoubtedly a loyal subject of the English Crown, in his unpublished treatise, "A Disquisition Touching that Great Question Whether an Act of Parliament made in England shall bind the People and Kingdom of Ireland" (1660), he argued for the right of the Irish Parliament to act independently and free from interference by the English Parliament.

Although the work was not published in his lifetime, his son-in-law William Molyneux drew on it for his own highly controversial treatise "The Case of Ireland's being bound by Acts of Parliament in England, Stated", and it is thought to have had considerable influence on later writers including Jonathan Swift.

== Background ==
He was born in Dublin to an ancient Cheshire family. His father Gilbert (1583–1637), son of William Domville of Lyme and Mary Mere, had moved to Ireland where he became Clerk of the Crown and Hanaper, and, after an unsuccessful attempt to get a seat in 1613, sat in the Irish House of Commons as member for Donegal Borough in the Irish Parliament of 1634. William's mother was Margaret Jones (died 1615), daughter of Thomas Jones, Archbishop of Dublin, and his wife Margaret Purdon. William had three sisters, one of whom, Margaret, was the mother of Anthony Dopping, Bishop of Meath. He was educated at St Albans School, Hertfordshire and Merton College, Oxford.

He entered Lincoln's Inn, and became a Bencher of the Inn in 1657. He was called to the Bar in 1640, and built up a highly successful practice at the English Bar.

== Career ==
During the English Civil War, Domville's loyalty to the Crown was never seriously questioned. His decision to practice law in England under the regime of Oliver Cromwell was not an unusual one even for a committed Royalist, and was not held against him later, since other Royalists had also made their peace with the new regime when the King's cause seemed to be lost. He lived then at Friern Barnet in Middlesex. At the Restoration of Charles II he returned to Ireland, and was knighted and made Attorney General, apparently on the recommendation of Daniel O'Neill, an Irish Groom of the Chamber to Charles II who had considerable influence in the first four years of the reign.

He entered the King's Inns in 1661. He received a substantial grant of lands at Templeogue, on the outskirts of Dublin city, which remained in the family for centuries. The value of the lands was greatly enhanced by the fact that the River Dodder flows through them, thus giving the Domvilles partial control of the supply of Dublin's drinking water, of which the Dodder was long the principal source. Strictly speaking, they had no right to control the supply of water; this power was vested solely in Dublin Corporation. Domville also had a townhouse in Bride Street, and was granted the estate at Loughlinstown which had been forfeited by the Goodman family.

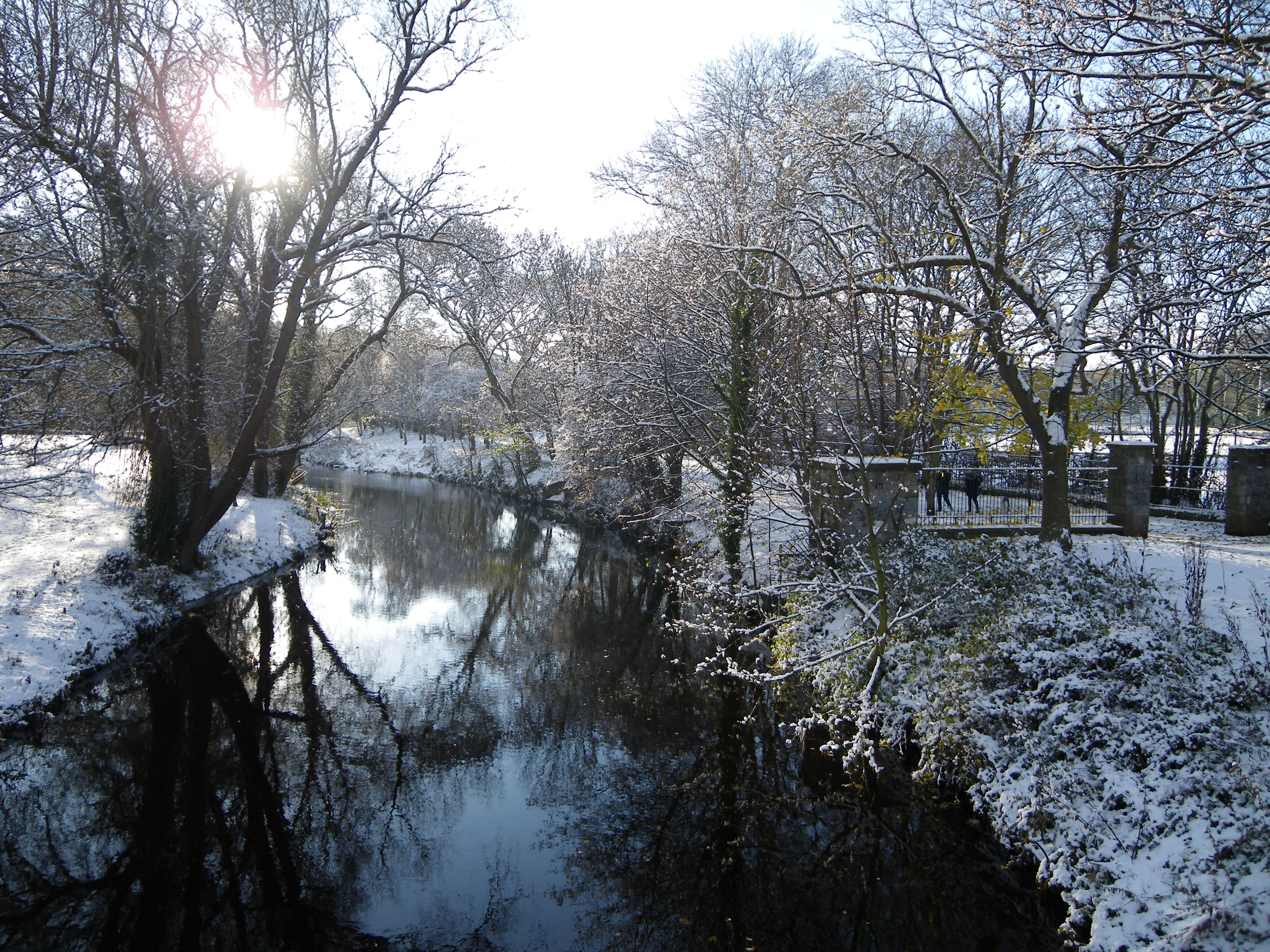
The River Dodder, which runs through what were then the Domville family's lands

He was elected to Parliament as member for County Dublin, and was the Crown's choice as Speaker. He faced opposition from the able and ambitious Prime Serjeant, Sir Audley Mervyn, who, apparently by spreading the story that Domville was sympathetic to Roman Catholics, gained the support of the majority of MPs (in fact Domville was a strong Protestant, although personally tolerant enough in matters of religion). The King, who was anxious to avoid a confrontation with Parliament so early in his reign, stated that the choice should be that of the members, and Mervyn was duly elected Speaker.

=== Domville's struggle for precedence with Audley Mervyn ===
The next few years saw a struggle between Domville and Mervyn for the role of principal legal adviser to the Crown. Domville emerged as the winner: both the King and the Lord Lieutenant of Ireland, James Butler, 1st Duke of Ormonde trusted him, whereas Mervyn had a reputation for corruption and his loyalty to the Crown was suspect. From about 1663 onwards Ormonde simply ignored Mervyn, and took legal advice only from Domville. This marked the effective end of the Prime Serjeant's role as chief legal adviser to the Crown and the start of the supremacy of the Irish Attorney General.

Domville personally prosecuted Florence Newton for witchcraft at Cork's assizes in 1661, and prosecuted some of those involved in the plot by Thomas Blood to seize Dublin Castle in 1663.

Domville was heavily involved in advising on the drafting of the Act of Settlement 1662, although he argued that his proper task was to "criticise" the Bill, rather than to draft it (the present practice is that the Attorney General of Ireland both "criticises" i.e. advises on any legal difficulties with a Bill, and also oversees the drafting, which is done by his officials). Domville admitted to finding the task one of great difficulty, yet he is said to have shown an unequalled mastery of the legal principles applicable.

=== Last years ===
On at least two occasions he refused a place on the High Court bench. It is said that he would have been willing to be Lord Chancellor of Ireland, but he was not offered the position. After the death of Charles II, Domville was retained in office briefly by James II before being replaced by Richard Nagle at the end of 1686. He was a staunch Protestant, though tolerant by the standards of the time, and it has been argued that he was seen as an obstacle to the aggressively pro-Catholic policy of the new regime; on the other hand, he may have been quite happy to retire, in view of his advanced age. He died in July 1689 and was buried in St Patrick's Cathedral, Dublin.

== Political views ==
He was the author of an unpublished treatise written about 1660, entitled: A Disquisition Touching That Great Question Whether an Act of Parliament Made in England shall bind the People and Kingdom of Ireland without their Allowance and Acceptance of such Act. Despite his unquestionable loyalty to the Crown, the views he expressed there on the separate authority of the Irish Parliament might well have been called subversive by some, at a time when the Civil War was still a fairly recent memory, and new political ideas tended to be regarded with great suspicion.

The existence of Domville's treatise does not seem to have been widely known in his own lifetime, although he did present a copy of it to the Duke of Ormonde shortly after completing it. His son-in-law William Molyneux drew on it for his own highly controversial work The Case of Ireland's being bound by Acts of Parliament in England, Stated (1698). Both men argued that while the King of England was also King of Ireland, the Parliament of Ireland was wholly independent of the English Parliament. These views, although they were considered radical, perhaps even seditious, at the time, (Molyneux's work was burned publicly) became widely accepted in the eighteenth century, and are said to have influenced Jonathan Swift.

== Family ==
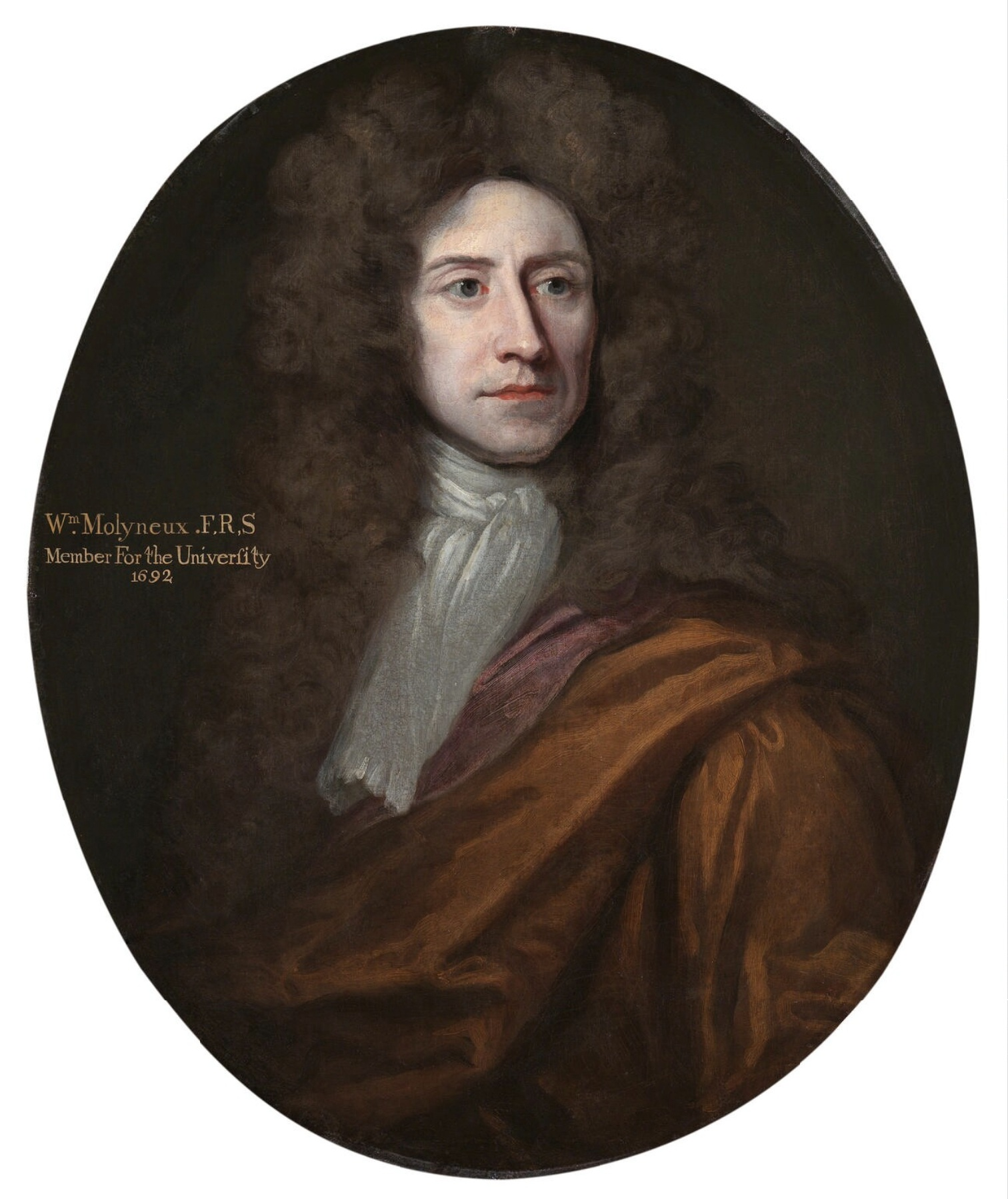
William Molyneux, Domville's son-in-law

Domville in 1637 married Bridget Lake, daughter of Sir Thomas Lake, Secretary of State to James I, and his wife Mary Ryder. Lady Lake, an eccentric and malicious woman whose false accusations had already landed her in the Tower of London, made trouble between William and his wife by insisting that he was already married. As with most of her sensational claims, usually directed at family members, this had no basis in fact. William and Bridget had four sons and three daughters. Their sons included Sir William Domville junior, MP for the borough of Antrim, and like his grandfather Clerk of the Crown and Hanaper, and Sir Thomas Domvile, the first of the Domvile baronets. The best known of their children was their daughter Lucy, a famous beauty who married the natural philosopher William Molyneux. Tragically Lucy went blind and died young leaving one surviving child, the astronomer Samuel Molyneux.

Legal offices
| Preceded by Robert Shapcote | Attorney-General for Ireland; 1660-1686 | Succeeded by Richard Nagle |
