= Donore, County Meath =

Donore Dún Uabhair
- Village
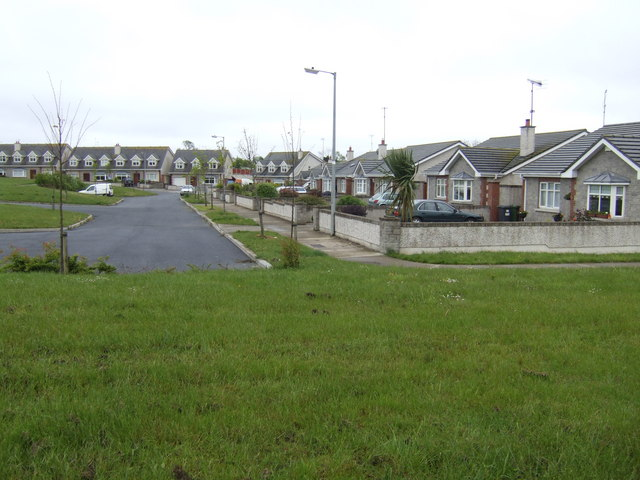
- Housing at Donore, County Meath

- Location in Ireland
- Coordinates: 53°41′31″N 6°24′59″W
- Country: Ireland
- Province: Leinster
- County: County Meath

Population (2022)
  - Total: 767

Donore (Irish: Dún Uabhair, meaning "fort of pride"), historically Dunower, is a small village in County Meath, Ireland. It lies near Drogheda on the border between County Meath and County Louth, in the Boyne Valley on the road between Drogheda and the Brú na Bóinne heritage site. The village is in a civil parish of the same name.

== History ==
The Irish name of the village, Dún Uabhair meaning "fort of pride", likely refers to a ringfort in the vicinity. Evidence of ancient settlement in the area includes several ringfort, fulacht fiadh, cairn and burnt mound sites in the townlands of Donore, Sheephouse, Stalleen and Cruicerath.

During the late 17th century, the village was used as a defensive position by the Jacobite army of King James II against King William III during the Battle of the Boyne (1690). The Battle of the Boyne Visitor Centre is located in the restored 18th century Oldbridge House, which is on the battle site at Oldbridge, approximately 3 km north of Donore.

St. Mary's Roman Catholic Church, which is in the center of Donore village, was built c.1840.

As of the late 20th century, Donore had a population of approximately 280 people. The village has since more than doubled in population, growing from 334 inhabitants as of the 2002 census to 767 as of the 2022 census.

== Amenities ==
Donore village has a pub and restaurant, shops, a take-away and a hairdresser. The local Gaelic Athletic Association club is St Mary's GFC.

== Public transport ==
Donore is served by Bus Éireann route 163 operating between Drogheda and the Brú na Bóinne Visitor Centre. The nearest railway station is Drogheda railway station approximately 6 kilometres distant.
