= Baron Tarbert =

Baron Tarbert was a Jacobite peerage; the junior title created by King James II of England for Dominick Roche, Mayor of Limerick in 1689. His main title was Viscount Cahiravahilla.

After the downfall of King James, Roche apparently remained in possession of his estates, but his male descendants apparently simply let the title lapse.
