= The Troubles in Trillick =

Incidents in Trillick, Northern Ireland during the Troubles

The Troubles in Trillick refers to incidents during, and the effects of, The Troubles in Trillick, County Tyrone, Northern Ireland.

Incidents in Trillick during the Troubles resulting in fatalities:

== 1971 ==
- 9 February 1971 - John Eakins (52), Harry Edgar (26) and George Beck (43), protestants, William Thomas (35) from Wales and David Henson (24) from England, all civilians, were killed in a Provisional Irish Republican Army (PIRA) landmine attack while travelling in a civilian Land Rover at Brougher Mountain, near Trillick. It was left as a booby trap for the British Army. No one was ever charged.

== 1974 ==
- 17 January 1974 - Robert Jameson (22), a protestant off-duty member of the Ulster Defence Regiment (UDR), was shot dead by the Irish Republican Army (IRA) while returning home from work, near his home in Trillick. No one was ever charged.
- 24 July 1974 - Patrick Kelly, a local nationalist councillor, was shot dead returning home from work. His body was dumped in nearby Lough Eyes, County Fermanagh, leading to a widespread community search at that time. No one was ever charged.
