= Anthony Dopping =

Irish Anglican priest (1643–1697)

Anthony Dopping (born Dublin, 28 March 1643 – 25 April 1697) was the Anglican Bishop of Meath, Ireland.

== Biography ==
He was born in Dublin, the son of Anthony Dopping, Clerk of the Privy Council of Ireland, who originally came from Frampton in Gloucestershire, but had bought an estate in County Meath in 1636. He married Margaret Domville, daughter of Gilbert Domville and sister of Sir William Domville, later Attorney General for Ireland. Anthony junior was educated at St Patrick's Cathedral School and entered Trinity College, Dublin in 1655.

He was a Fellow of Trinity College and consecrated as Bishop of Kildare on 2 February 1679. He was translated to the Diocese of Meath on 14 January 1681 and made vice-Chancellor of Trinity College and a Privy Councillor. He served as Bishop of Meath until his death in 1697. When James Margetson, Archbishop of Dublin, fled during the reign of the Catholic King James II of England, Dopping remained in Dublin as the main Protestant spokesman.

Although assuring King James of his loyalty, Dopping strongly advocated the Protestant minority viewpoint. He attended the Irish House of Lords during the short-lived Patriot Parliament in 1689, acting as leader of the opposition. After the Battle of the Boyne in 1690, he immediately proceeded to William III of Orange's camp to declare his allegiance to the new king.

He died in Dublin in 1697 and was buried in St Andrew's.

=== Family ===
Dopping married a sister of William and Thomas Molyneux: Jane, daughter of Samuel Molyneux of Castle Dillon, County Armagh, Master Gunner of Ireland, with whom he had two sons and four daughters. The elder son, Samuel, became MP for Armagh and his younger son, Anthony, became Bishop of Ossory.
