= Richard Nagle =

Irish Jacobite politician and lawyer

The Right Honourable Sir Richard Nagle PC

Attorney-General for Ireland
- In office 1686–1691
- Monarch: James II
- Preceded by: Sir William Domville
- Succeeded by: Sir John Temple

Speaker of the Irish House of Commons
- In office May 1689 – 20 July 1689
- Monarch: James II
- Preceded by: Sir Audley Mervyn
- Succeeded by: Richard Levinge

Personal details
- Born: Richard Nagle; 1636 Carrigacunna Castle, Killavullen, Ireland
- Died: 6 April 1699 (aged 62–63)
- Resting place: Saint-Germain, France
- Spouse: Jane Kearney
- Education: Gray's Inn
- Occupation: Politician, lawyer

Sir Richard Nagle (1636 – 6 April 1699) was an Irish Jacobite politician and lawyer. He held the positions of Attorney-General for Ireland, Speaker of the Irish House of Commons, Lord Justice of Ireland and Secretary of State and War for Ireland under King James II. He fled to France in 1691 in the wake of the Jacobite defeat in Ireland, joining James II at Saint-Germain-en-Laye, where he resumed his duties as nominal Secretary of State and War. He later served as Commissioner of the Household.

== Biography ==
Richard was born into an Old English family at Carrigacunna Castle, in County Cork, the son of James Nagle of Annakissy, and James' wife, Honora Nugent. This was his family's seat. His brother Pierce was a future High Sheriff of County Cork. Although Richard initially intended to join the clergy, he was educated in law at Gray's Inn and was called to the bar in Dublin. "Active and skilful", he had a successful career as a lawyer. The Earl of Tyrconnell brought Richard to England with him in 1685 to meet James II. James created him Attorney-General for Ireland and knighted him in 1686. He also appointed him to the Privy Council of Ireland.

As an MP for Cork, Nagle was elected Speaker by the Irish House of Commons in 1689. This parliament is known to posterity as the "Patriot Parliament". It spurned the outcome of the Glorious Revolution, recognising King James's divine right to the Irish crown over William of Orange's parliamentary one. William, made King of England during the revolution, was set on conquering Ireland from James, and to achieve that end he launched the Williamite War. Richard was diametrically opposed to the Act of Settlement 1662 (he was the author of A Letter from Coventry, an anti-settlement pamphlet), which had punished royalists and Roman Catholics who had fought against parliament in the Civil Wars; he unsuccessfully advocated its repeal in this session.

James's Irish Army forces were routed by William's at the Battle of the Boyne, in 1690; King James retreated to Dublin. It was here he convened a council that advised him to flee to France. Nagle was one of its members. They reasoned that if he did not leave "he would run a great risk of being taken by the enemy". James followed their advice. Nagle, accompanied by Tyrconnell, visited him at his court-in-exile, Saint Germain, at the end of 1690. In Nagle's absence, his duties as Secretary of State were executed by Thomas Nugent, 1st Baron Nugent of Riverston.

Upon the death of Tyrconnell, the Lord Lieutenant of Ireland, Nagle became one of the Lord Justices of Ireland. The others were Francis Plowden and Baron Fitton of Gawsworth. They administered what remained of Jacobite Ireland in the place of the Lord Lieutenant, though they did not assume command of the armed forces.

Sir Richard Nagle married Jane (Joan) O'Kearney on 19 September 1669 at Clonbrogan, Ireland. Jane's sister, Mary O'Kearney, married Sir Richard's brother, Pierce Nagle of Annakissy, the high sheriff of County Cork in 1689.

== Bibliography ==
=== References ===
- Corp, Edward T: A Court in Exile: the Stuarts in France, 1689–1718. Cambridge University Press. 2009.
- Cruise O'Brien, Conor: The Great Melody: A Thematic Biography of Edmund Burke. Chicago University Press. 1993.
- D'Alton, John: King James' Irish Army List. IGF. 1997.
- Gibson, CB: The History of the County and City of Cork – Volume II. READ BOOKS. 2008.
- Historical and Archaeological Society, Cork: Journal of the Cork Historical and Archaeological Society. The Society. 1917.
- Murray, Robert Henry: Revolutionary Ireland and its Settlement. Macmillan. 1911.
- Seward, Paul: Parliamentary History: Speakers and Speakership. Blackwell Publishing. 2010.

=== Notes ===
Legal offices
Preceded by William Domville	Attorney General for Ireland; 1686–1690	Succeeded by John Temple; As Attorney-General for Williamite Ireland
Preceded by William Domville	Attorney General for Ireland; 1686–1690	Succeeded by Himself; As Attorney-General for Jacobite Ireland
Preceded by Himself; As Attorney-General for Ireland	Attorney General for Jacobite Ireland; 1690–1691	Succeeded by John Temple; As Attorney-General for Ireland
Political offices
Vacant Title last held by Sir Audley Mervyn	Speaker of the Irish House of Commons; 1689–1692	Succeeded by Sir Richard Levinge
