= Nathaniel Boyse =

Irish politician

Nathaniel Boyse was an Irish politician.

Boyse was born in Wexford and educated at Trinity College, Dublin. From 1692 until 1714, he was MP for Bannow.
