= Baron Fitton of Gawsworth =

Jacobite peerage created in 1689

Baron Fitton of Gawsworth was a Jacobite peerage created by James II in 1689 for his Lord Chancellor of Ireland, Alexander Fitton (died 1698). Fitton took his title from Gawsworth Old Hall, the ancestral family home in Cheshire. The title was not recognised by James' successors to the English Crown, but it is recorded in the Irish Patent Roll. In any case, the title would have been extinguished by Fitton's death in 1698 without a male heir.
