= Audley Mervyn (died 1717) =

Audley Mervyn (by 1663 - 17 June 1717) was a Member of Parliament for County Tyrone from August 1695 to 1699.
