= Audley Mervyn =

Sir Audley Mervyn of Trillick (1603?–1675) was a lawyer and politician in seventeenth-century Ireland. He was MP for County Tyrone and Speaker of the Irish House of Commons 1661–1666.

He was the second son of Sir Henry Mervyn of Petersfield, Hampshire, who married his cousin Lady Christian Tuchet, daughter of George Tuchet, 1st Earl of Castlehaven and his wife Lucy Mervyn, only daughter of Sir James Mervyn of Fonthill Gifford and his first wife Amy Clarke.

== Early career ==
He attended Christ Church, Oxford. He moved to Ireland, at the suggestion of his Castlehaven relatives, who had large estates in that country, and himself became a substantial Irish landowner, principally in County Tyrone. By 1640 he had become a captain in the 10,000 man army raised for Thomas Wentworth, 1st Earl of Strafford for the invasion of Scotland. and in the same year was elected MP for County Tyrone. In 1641 he led the attack on Strafford in the Irish House of Commons, presenting articles of impeachment against Sir Richard Bolton, Lord Chancellor of Ireland; John Bramhall, Bishop of Derry; Sir Gerard Lowther, Chief Justice of the Irish Common Pleas; and Sir George Radcliffe, member of the Privy Council of Ireland. These were all friends and ministers of the Earl of Strafford, then under impeachment by the House of Commons of England. The impeachment failed but Stafford was attainted and executed in May 1641. Mervyn played an active part in the proceedings, carrying the Irish Parliament's Remonstrance against Strafford, which denounced his government of Ireland as a tyranny without precedent, to the English House of Commons.

Between 1641 and 1661 Mervyn served in the Army, rising to the rank of colonel. In 1644 he was appointed Governor of Londonderry but was soon after removed when he took the covenant "on the grounds of expediency". His movements during the 1650s are unclear: at one point he was arrested and returned to England but was shortly thereafter allowed to go back to Ulster. He decided on a legal career and entered the King's Inn in 1658.

== Restoration ==
In 1660 he was appointed as one of twelve commissioners sent from Tyrone to treat with Charles II. He was knighted, and was appointed to the post of Prime Serjeant, the most senior law office in Ireland. However Ormonde, the Lord Lieutenant, had always distrusted him and preferred to take advice only from the Attorney General for Ireland, Sir William Domville, so that in a few years Mervyn's role as Crown legal adviser effectively lapsed. From then on the Attorney General of Ireland was always regarded as the senior Law Officer.

He was chosen Speaker of the House of Commons in May 1661 when again member for Tyrone, against the wishes of the King, who would have preferred William Domville. It was said that his fellow MPs chose him for his eloquence "of a style much admired at the time", full of Scriptural allusions and quotations from the Classics, mixed up with quotations from recent legal writers like Sir Edward Coke. Shortly thereafter he went to England for nine months between September 1661 and May 1662 to take part in negotiations on the Act of Settlement 1662. When he returned he played an influential role in the House and was at the same time involved in the Court of Claims set up under the Act of Settlement to adjudicate land claims. This led to charges of corruption against him. He was Speaker until the dissolution of Parliament in 1666, although he had greatly offended the King, and his loyalty to the Crown was deeply suspect. He continued with his legal practice, but his later years are rather obscure. In 1663 he was chosen as Recorder of Carrickfergus, (the choice was by popular vote and was not a Crown appointment), but never took up office.

== Family ==
He married, firstly, in 1638, Mary Dillon, daughter of John Dillon of Castle Dillon, and widow of Francis Windsor. He married, secondly, Martha, (died 1685), daughter of Sir Hugh Clotworthy and Mary Langford, and sister of the leading politician John Clotworthy, 1st Viscount Massereene.

By the two marriages, he had at least three sons and two daughters, including Henry, the eldest son and heir, Hugh and Guy. His principal seat was Trillick Castle (or Castle Tuchet), County Tyrone, which remained in the Mervyn family for several generations.

== Reputation ==
According to the Oxford Dictionary of National Biography, "Opinions concerning Mervyn, both in his own day and since, have been various, but rarely complimentary, with frequent accusations of corruption, lack of scruple, or the pursuit of self-interest above principle".

Political offices
Vacant Title last held by Sir Maurice Eustace	Speaker of the Irish House of Commons; 1661–1666	Vacant Title next held by Sir Richard Nagle
