= County Tyrone (Parliament of Ireland constituency) =

Pre-1801 Irish constituency

Coordinates: 54.612°N 7.163°W

- Former county constituency for the Irish House of Commons
- County: County Tyrone

–1801
- Seats: 2
- Replaced by: County Tyrone (UKHC)

County Tyrone was a constituency represented in the Irish House of Commons until 1800.

== Members of Parliament ==
Election	First MP		Second MP
1613	Sir Thomas Ridgeway		Sir Francis Roe
1634	Sir James Erskine		Sir Henry Tichborne
1639	Tobias Caulfeild, 3rd Baron Caulfeild		Sir Audley Mervyn
1656	Sir Tristram Beresford, 1st Baronet		Thomas Newburgh
1661	Sir Audley Mervyn		Sir Arthur Forbes, Bt
1689	Gordon O'Neill		Lewis Doe
1692	James Hamilton	Tory	Henry Mervyn
1695	James Hamilton	Tory	Henry Mervyn
1703	Richard Stewart		Audley Mervyn
1715	Charles Stewart		Audley Mervyn
1717	Charles Stewart		Audley Mervyn
1727	Richard Stewart		Henry Mervyn
1729	Robert Lindsay		Henry Mervyn
1733	James Stewart		Henry Mervyn
1748	Galbraith Lowry		Henry Mervyn
1764	Galbraith Lowry		William Stewart
1768	Armar Lowry		James Stewart
1781	Nathaniel Montgomery		James Stewart
1790	Hon. Thomas Knox		James Stewart
1798	Somerset Lowry-Corry, Viscount Corry		James Stewart
1801	Succeeded by Westminster constituency County Tyrone		
