= Patriot Parliament =

1688 to 1691 Irish parliament

The Patriot Parliament is the name commonly used for the Irish Parliament session called by King James II during the Williamite War in Ireland which lasted from 1688 to 1691. The first since 1666, it held only one session, which lasted from 7 May 1689 to 20 July 1689. Irish nationalist historian Sir Charles Gavan Duffy first used the term Patriot Parliament in 1893.

The House of Commons was 70 members short since there were no elections in the northern counties; as a result, its members were overwhelmingly Old English and Catholic. Sir Richard Nagle was elected speaker, while the House of Lords was led by Baron Fitton; the opposition was led by Anthony Dopping, a Church of Ireland cleric who served as the Bishop of Meath.

The term is controversial, for this Parliament was deeply divided. The deliberate destruction of its records after 1695 means that assessments, both negative and positive, often rely on individual accounts.

== Background ==
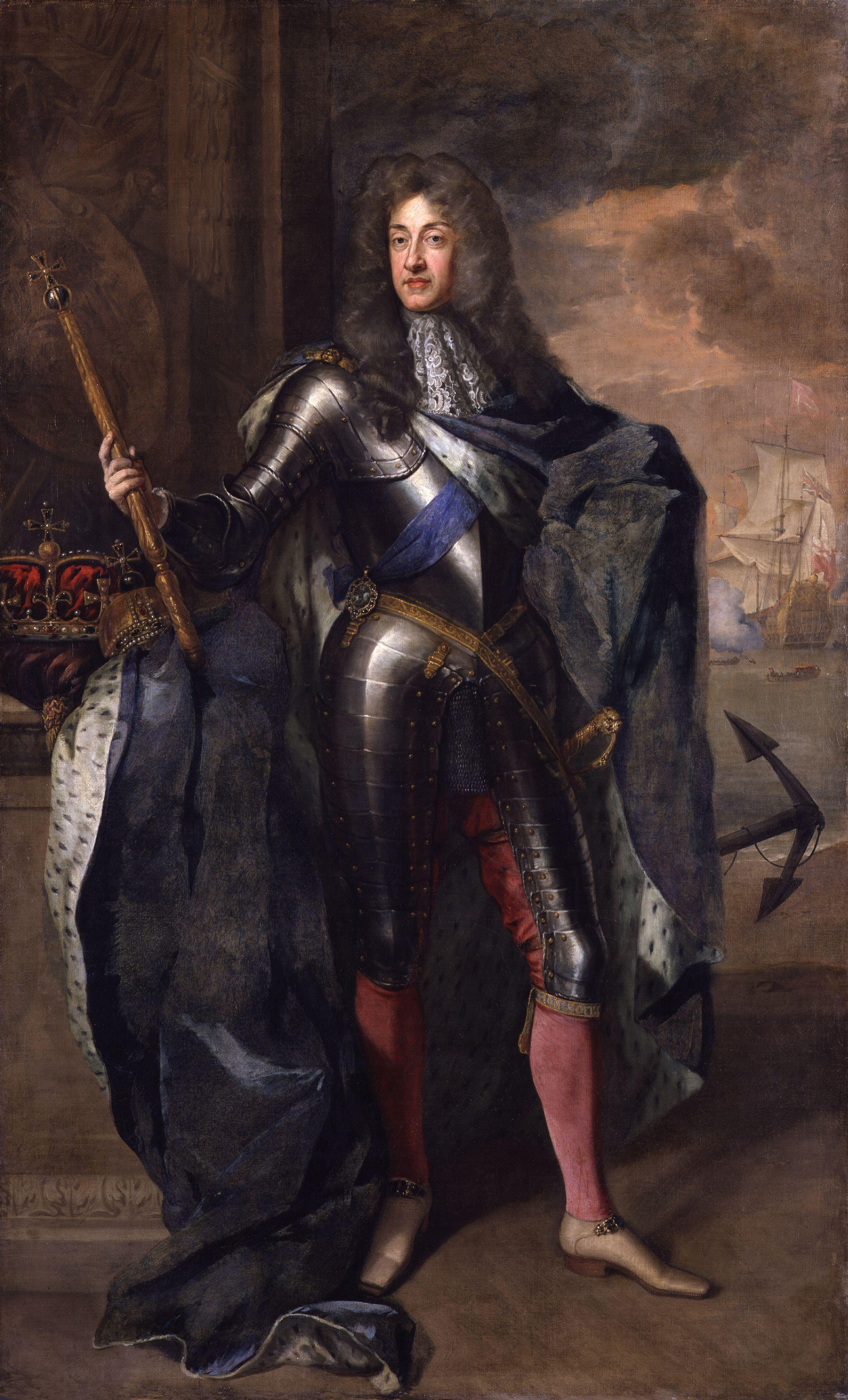
Portrait of James II by Godfrey Kneller, 1684

In November 1688, James II of England was deposed by the Glorious Revolution, and replaced with his daughter, Mary II, and her husband, William of Orange. He subsequently went into exile in France, where he was sheltered by Louis XIV. Seeking to divert resources from the ongoing Nine Years' War, the latter financed an attempt to restore James by landing in Ireland, where support was highest due to his Catholicism. Accordingly, he launched the Williamite War in Ireland on 12 March 1689.

Nearly 75% of the Irish population, or around 800,000, were Catholic, and for them the most pressing issues were restrictions on their ability to hold public office, and land reform. The proportion owned by Catholics had declined from 90% in 1600 to 22% by 1685, most of it concentrated in the hands of the Old English elite. There was also a small mercantile class who objected to restrictions imposed on Irish trade.

While Catholic support was largely based on James' perceived willingness to allow the Parliament of Ireland greater autonomy, this clashed with Stuart concepts of a unitary state of England, Scotland and Ireland. Like Louis XIV, he also claimed the right to appoint Catholic bishops and clergy in his kingdoms, which caused conflict with Pope Innocent XI.

== Composition ==
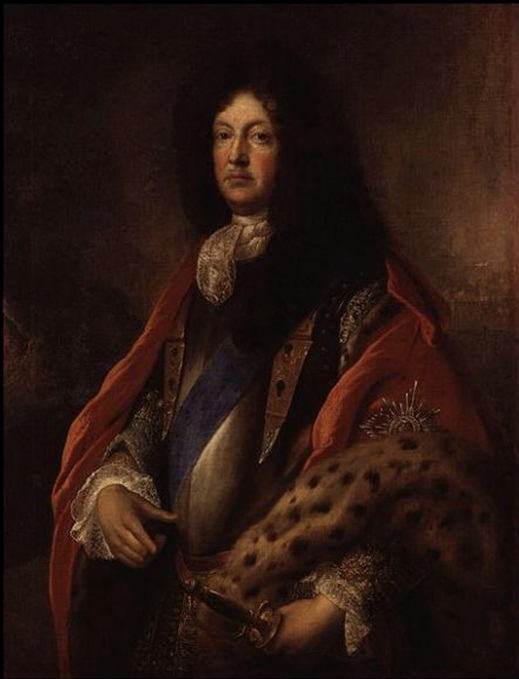
Earl of Tyrconnell, member of the Old English Catholic elite whose main objective was Irish autonomy

In March 1689, James landed in Ireland and issued writs for the first Irish Parliament since 1666. Tyrconnell ensured a predominately Catholic electorate by issuing new borough charters, that added Catholics to city corporations, and removed "disloyal members", many of whom were Protestant. The war prevented elections being held in Counties Fermanagh and Donegal, leaving the Commons seventy MPs short; six were Protestant, 224 Catholic.

Sir Richard Nagle, a wealthy lawyer and close ally of Tyrconnell, acted as leader of the Commons. The Lords was led by Baron Fitton, who had spent 1664 to 1684 imprisoned for criminal libel; allegedly selected by James because he was a Protestant, he promptly converted to Catholicism. The Lords included five Protestant peers, the most prominent being Viscount Mountjoy, and four bishops from the Church of Ireland, the Bishop of Meath serving as leader of the opposition.

A French diplomat observed James had 'a heart too English to do anything that might vex the English'. He viewed the Irish campaign as a distraction from regaining the English throne, and as concessions to Irish Catholics cost him support from Protestants in England and Scotland, he made them with reluctance.

This meant although Tyrconnell was personally loyal to James, the Catholic minority who benefited from the 1662 Land Settlement mistrusted him. Led by the Earl of Limerick, they wanted to negotiate from strength, and retain the gains made under Tyrconnell. Some purchased lands confiscated in 1652, including Tyrconnell, Limerick and James himself; this placed them in opposition to those who wanted the position reset to 1641, and an end to their exclusion from government positions. While a minority in Parliament, they were a majority in the country.

Traditionally, these differences were presented as an ethnic division between Irish Gaels and Old English; in 1692, Jacobite historian Charles O'Kelly claimed Tyrconnell fatally weakened the cause by his opposition to the Gaels. There is some truth in this, particularly as Parliament failed to address compensation for estates confiscated prior to 1641, much of it from Gaelic landowners in Ulster. Modern historians argue that the differences were based primarily on economics, although those who benefitted from the 1662 Settlement were mostly Old English, those who did not, mostly Gaelic.

== Key legislation ==
The 1689 Parliament "ended up going much further than James would have liked, while ... falling short of what many Irish Catholics hoped for." Called in order to raise funds for the war, Parliament approved a subsidy of £20,000 per month for 13 months, but had no way to raise the funds.

The Act of Recognition recognised James's right to the Crown of Ireland and compared the usurpation by William III to the murder of James' father Charles I. It emphasised indefeasible hereditary rights and the Divine right of kings; these contradicted the 1689 English Bill of Rights and Scottish Articles of Grievances, which made explicit an assumed Social contract between a king and his subjects.

The Declaratory Act affirmed the Kingdom of Ireland as always having been "distinct" from England, and no Act of the English Parliament was binding unless ratified by the Irish Parliament. However, Poynings' Law remained on the books; created in 1494, this effectively allowed the English Parliament to legislate for Ireland and James was unwilling to repeal it.

Land Settlement: despite opposition in the Lords from Protestants, and the small number of Catholics who had purchased land since 1660, Parliament refused to approve taxes until James agreed to repeal the 1652 Cromwellian Settlement and Act of Settlement 1662. However, it failed to address compensation for estates confiscated prior to 1641, many held by Gaelic landowners, particularly those lost after Tyrone's Rebellion in 1603.

The Great Act of Attainder named 2,470 Protestants as traitors, subject to confiscation of property and their lives. While many viewed this as unwise, it was the only way to raise money for the taxes voted by Parliament; after defeat, it was used to justify a new round of confiscations.

An Act for Liberty of Conscience allowed freedom of worship and civic and political equality for Roman Catholics and Protestant Dissenters, and removed the requirement for the Oath of Supremacy. However, it retained the Act of Uniformity; while James sought the abolition of penalties against liberty of conscience, he viewed the Church of Ireland as an essential element of his support and wanted to retain it, despite his own Catholicism.

== Aftermath ==
After their defeat at the Boyne in July 1690, the Jacobites abandoned Dublin and retreated to Limerick, while James left Ireland. After the October 1691 Treaty of Limerick ended the war, all legislation enacted by the Patriot Parliament was declared void by the Parliament of England. The 1695 Irish Parliament passed an act, 7 Will. 3. c. 3 (I), declaring all actions of the "late pretended Parliament" void and ordered its records destroyed.

For 19th-century Irish nationalists, its declaration of autonomy was the most important act of the 1689 Parliament. Shortly before his death in 1843, Young Ireland leader Thomas Davis wrote a history of the Parliament, which explicitly linked it to the 1798 Rebellion. The term "Patriot Parliament" was first used in 1893 by Irish nationalist historian Sir Charles Gavan Duffy.

== Sources ==
- Bartlett, Thomas (2010). Ireland: A History. Cambridge University Press. ISBN 9780521197205.
- Bartlett, Thomas; Jeffery, Keith (1997). A Military History of Ireland. Cambridge UP.
- Connolly, SJ (2008). Divided Kingdom: Ireland 1630-1800. OUP. ISBN 978-0199543472.
- Davis, Thomas Osborne (1843). The Irish Parliament of James II. University College Cork.
- Doyle, Thomas (1997). "Jacobitism, Catholicism and the Irish Protestant Elite, 1700-1710". Eighteenth-Century Ireland / Iris an Dá Chultúr. 12: 28–59. doi:10.3828/eci.1997.4. JSTOR 30071383. S2CID 256147597.
- Firth, CH (1937). Davies, Godfrey (ed.). A Commentary on Macaulay's History of England (2008 ed.). Hesperides Press. ISBN 978-1443725637.
- Gillen, Ultan (2016). Ascendency Ireland, 1660–1800 in Princeton History of Modern Ireland. Princeton University Press. ISBN 978-0691154060.
- Harris, Tim (2006). Revolution: The Great Crisis of the British Monarchy, 1685–1720 (2007 ed.). Penguin. ISBN 978-0141016528.
- Hill, Christopher (1961). The Century of Revolution, 1603-1714 (2002 ed.). Psychology Press. ISBN 9780415267397.
- Lenihan, Padraig (2008). Consolidating Conquest: Ireland 1603–1727 (2016 ed.). Routledge. ISBN 978-1138140639.
- McGuire, James (2004). Nagle, Sir Richard (Online ed.). Oxford DNB.
- Miller, John (1989) [1978]. James II; A study in kingship. Methuen. ISBN 978-0413652904.
- Moody; Martin; Byrne, eds. (2009). A New History of Ireland: Volume III: Early Modern Ireland 1534-1691. OUP. ISBN 9780198202424.
- Ó Ciardha, Eamonn (2000). Ireland and the Jacobite Cause, 1685–1766: A Fatal Attachment. Four Courts Press. ISBN 978-1851825349.
- Stephen, Jeffrey (January 2010). "Scottish Nationalism and Stuart Unionism". Journal of British Studies. 49 (1, Scottish Special). doi:10.1086/644534. S2CID 144730991.
- Simms, JG (1970). Jacobite Ireland, 1685-91. Routledge. ISBN 978-0710064462.
- Stater, Victor (2007). "Fitton, Alexander [styled Sir Alexander Fitton], Jacobite Baron Fitton (d. 1699), politician and Jacobite sympathizer". Oxford Dictionary of National Biography (online ed.). Oxford University Press. doi:10.1093/ref:odnb/9520. (Subscription, Wikipedia Library access or UK public library membership required.)
- Sullivan, Eileen (1979). Thomas Davis (Irish Writers Series). Bucknell University Press. ISBN 978-0838712344.
- Szechi, Daniel (1994). The Jacobites: Britain and Europe 1688-1788. Manchester University Press. ISBN 9780719037740.
- Wormsley, David (2015). James II: The Last Catholic King. Allen Lane. ISBN 978-0141977065.
