= John Lind (barrister) =

John Lind (1737–1781) was an English barrister, political activist, and pamphleteer who opposed the American Revolution.

Lind was educated at Balliol College of Oxford, receiving an MA in 1761. While there he began a long association and friendship with Jeremy Bentham He was a Fellow of the Society of Antiquaries, and in November 1773 was elected a Fellow of the Royal Society.

== Early life ==
John Lind was born on 13 August 1737, the only son of the Rev. Charles Lind, D.D. His father was vicar of West Mersea 1738–48, rector of Wivenhoe 1750–1771, and rector of Paglesham 1752–71, all livings in Essex. He married a Miss Porter of Winchester, and died 6 March 1771, leaving his livings sequestrated and two daughters.

Lind matriculated on 22 May 1753 at Balliol College, Oxford, graduating with a BA degree 1757 and MA in 1761. About 1758, he took deacon's orders in the Church of England, and a few years later accompanied John Murray on his embassy to Constantinople in the capacity of chaplain, but as "too agreeable to his Excellency's mistress" was dismissed from his post.

== In Poland ==
John Lind then went to Warsaw, where he dropped his clerical pretensions and became tutor to Prince Stanisław Poniatowski. He was noticed by King Stanisław August Poniatowski, who made him governor of an institution for educating cadets, and the title of privy councillor. In 1773, after the First Partition of Poland, he returned to England with a pension from the king and added to his income by reading to Prince Czartoryski, the king's uncle.

== In England ==
Lind was burdened by his father's debts and by the support of his sisters, Mary and Lætitia, who ran a boarding school for girls at Colchester. He was received by Lord North, then prime minister, and was a familiar figure at the card parties of Henrietta Maria North, wife of Brownlow North. The king of Poland had given him letters of introduction to Lord Mansfield, by whom he was employed to advocate his political views, and through whose management he was admitted at Lincoln's Inn 23 June 1773, and called to the bar in 1776. Lind, already an F.S.A., was elected F.R.S. in 1773.

Among Lind's close friends was Jeremy Bentham, who gave the bride away on Lind's marriage at St Andrew's, Holborn. Lind wanted to enter parliament but failed. After some years mainly spent pamphleteering, he died in Lamb's Conduit Street, London, on 12 January 1781, and was buried in Long Ditton churchyard, in Surrey, where a white marble scroll, with an inscription by Sir Herbert Croft, was placed to his memory on the outside of the north wall of the church.

== Works ==
Lind's first publication was Letters concerning the Present State of Poland (anon.), 1773, 2nd ed. 1773, against the First Partition of Poland. He was supported in writing it by Lord Mansfield and Viscount Stormont. He was also almost certainly the author of the much translated The Polish partition : illustrated; in seven dramatick dialogues, or, conversation pieces, between remarkable personages, published from the mouths and actions of the interlocutors. By Gotlieb Pansmouzer, the Baron's nephew, which is often mistakenly attributed to Theophilus Lindsey. Lind's other works were:

- Remarks on the Principal Acts of the Thirteenth Parliament of Great Britain, vol. i. containing remarks on the acts relating to the American colonies (the Intolerable Acts), with a plan of reconciliation, 1775. Samuel Parr praised this work as a defence of the British case against the colonists, and Bentham claimed to have made its outline.
- An Answer to the Declaration of the American Congress (anon.), 1776. Hired by the ministry of Lord North to comment on the Declaration of Independence. Bentham's supposed involvement with the content has been seen as evidence of his early commitment against natural rights.
- Three Letters to Dr. Price, containing Remarks on his Observations on the Nature of Civil Liberty, by a Member of Lincoln's Inn, 1776. Abusive attack on Richard Price.
- Defence of Lord Pigot (anon.), 1777. On behalf of George Pigot, 1st Baron Pigot.
- A Letter to the Rt. Hon. Willoughby Bertie, by descent Earl of Abingdon, in which his candid and liberal treatment of the new Earl of Mansfield is fully vindicated (anon.), 1778. A satirical reply to Lord Abingdon's attack on Lord Mansfield.

For his works in justification of the American War of Independence, a pension payment is said to have been conferred on each of Lind's sisters.

Two papers on ancient monuments and fortifications in Scotland were communicated to Archæologia through Lind. His defence of Bentham's Fragment on Government appeared in the Morning Chronicle, 26 July 1776, and was reproduced in Bentham's Works, i. 258–9. A reply from Sir James Wright on Lord Bute's action and opinions is said by Horace Walpole to have been written by Lind.

== Family ==
Lind's pension was continued to his widow and paid regularly until 1794, when delays arose. These were solved by Bentham, who entered into correspondence with the czar of Russia on the subject. Lind had brought to England an illegitimate daughter, and at his death, she and his two sisters were left destitute. Croft solicited a subscription for them and for the widow, who refused to accept it. Elizabeth, another of his sisters, married Captain William Borthwick, of the artillery, and died 2 May 1764, aged 29.
