= Portrait of Sir William Hamilton =

Painting by David Allan

Portrait of Sir Sir William Hamilton
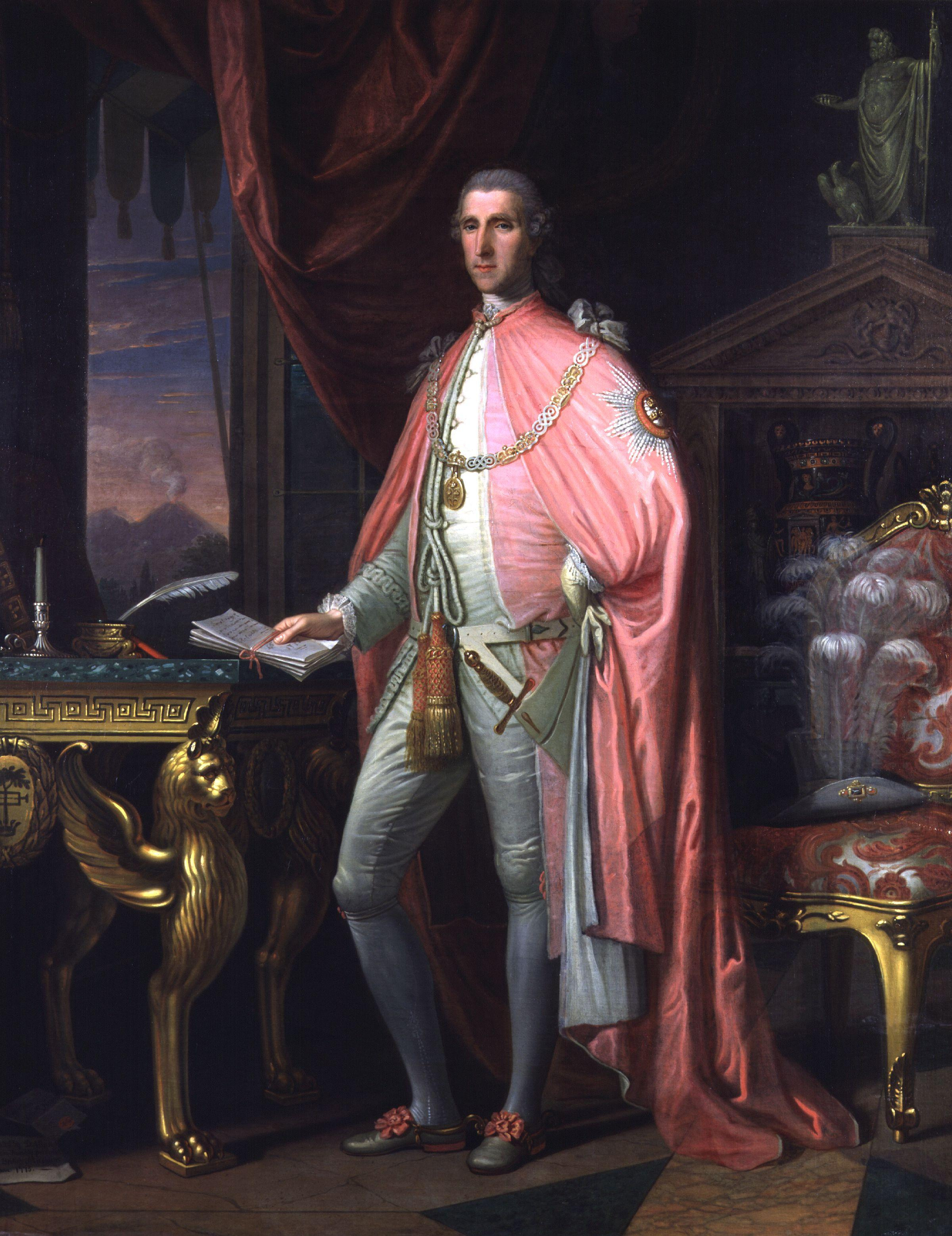
- Artist: David Allan
- Year: 1775
- Type: Oil on canvas, portrait painting
- Dimensions: 226 cm × 180 cm (89 in × 71 in)
- Location: National Portrait Gallery; London

Portrait of Sir William Hamilton is a 1775 portrait painting by the British artist David Allan. It depicts the diplomat Sir William Hamilton. He served as the British Envoy to the Kingdom of Naples from 1764 to 1800, but is today known for his marriage to Emma, Lady Hamilton, the lover of Admiral Horatio Nelson.

It shows Hamilton at his official residence the Palazzo Sessa in Naples with Vesuvius in the distance. Allan produced the work during a lengthy stay in Italy, having previously painted a more informal double portrait of Hamilton and his first wife Catherine. He produced the work as a tribute to the diplomat and offered as a gift to the British Museum which had in 1772 acquired the Hamilton Collection of antiquities. However, although it was accepted by the Museum, Hamilton soon afterwards commissioned the President of the Royal Academy Joshua Reynolds to produce another portrait of him and it was this that was hung in the British Museum from 1782. In 1879 it was transferred to the National Portrait Gallery.

== Bibliography ==
- Contogouris, Ersy. Emma Hamilton and Late Eighteenth-Century European Art: Agency, Performance, and Representation. Taylor & Francis, 2018.
- Ingamells, John. National Portrait Gallery Mid-Georgian Portraits, 1760-1790. National Portrait Gallery, 2004.
- Ramage, Nancy H. & Ramage, Andrew. Art of the Romans: Romulus to Constantine. Pearson, 1991.
- Williams, Kate. England's Mistress: The Infamous Life of Emma Hamilton. Random House, 2012.
