= San Giacomo Altarpiece (Veronese) =

16th-century oil on canvas triptych

The San Giacomo Altarpiece was a 1577–1580 oil on canvas triptych by Paolo Veronese and his workshop, named after a now-demolished church on Murano in Venice. Its three panels are now split between the Barber Institute (Visitation), Chelsea and Westminster Hospital (Resurrection) and Burghley House (Zebedee’s Wife Petitioning Our Lord).

Wife was bought by Brownlow Cecil, 9th Earl of Exeter in 1769. Visitation was bought by Sir James Wright, Britain's ambassador to Venice, in the 1770s. Resurrection was acquired by Westminster Hospital.

== Gallery ==
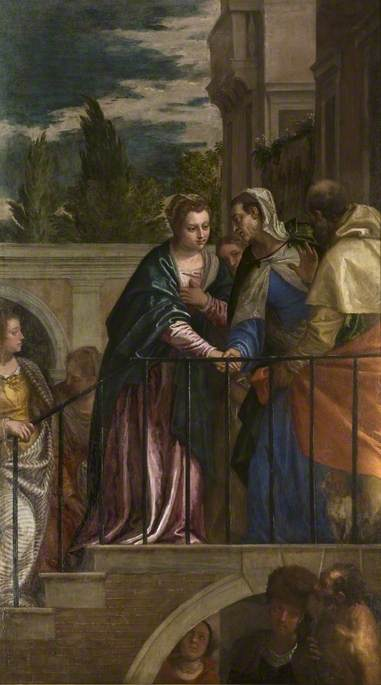
Visitation

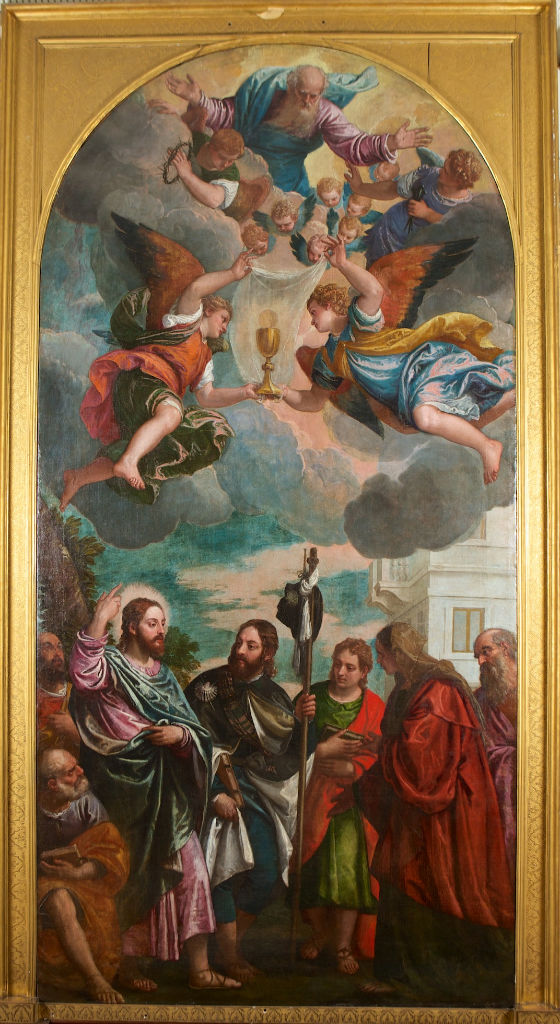
Zebedee's Wife Petitioning Our Lord

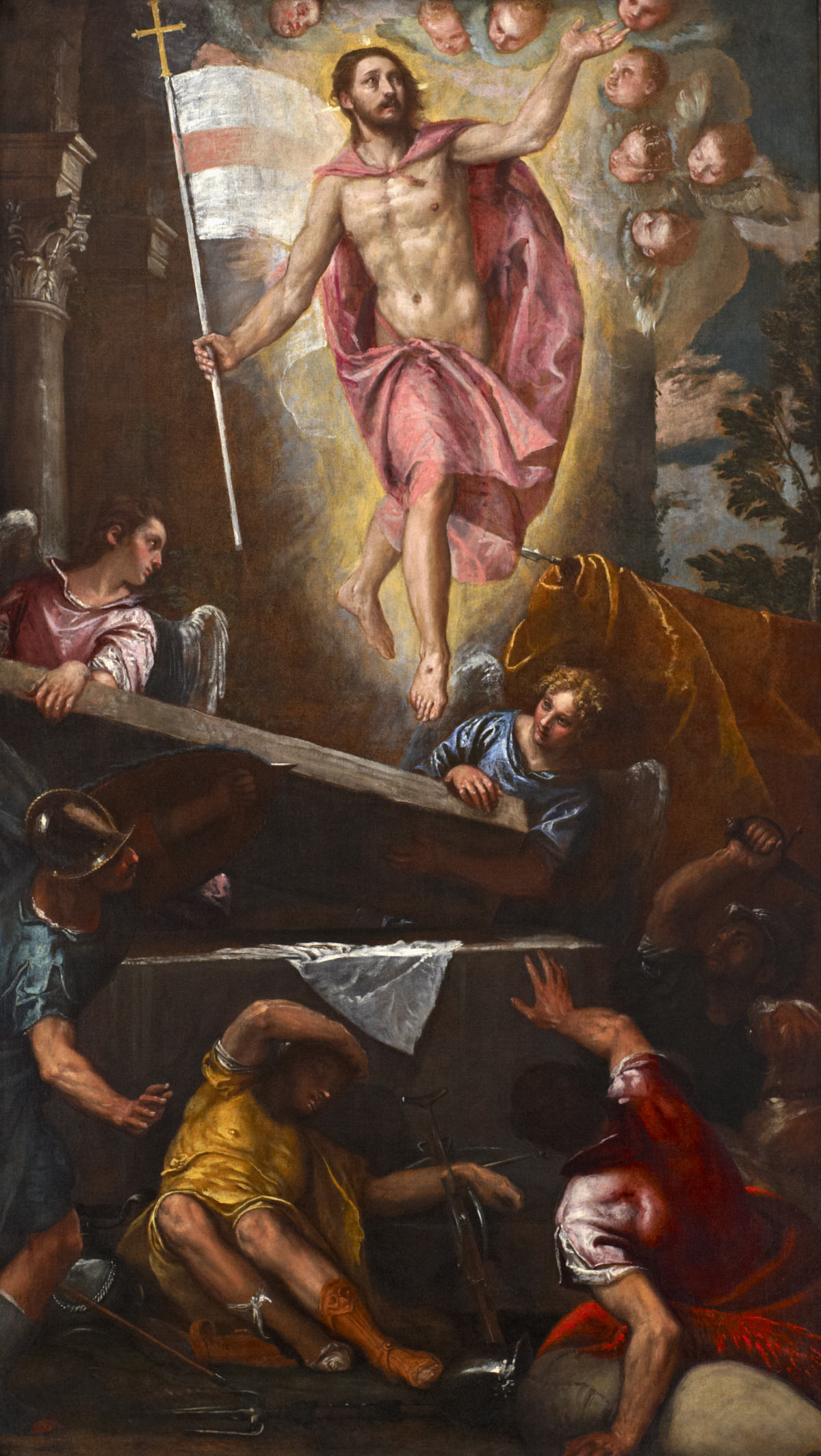
Resurrection
