= Charles Compton, 7th Earl of Northampton =

British peer and diplomat (1737–1763)

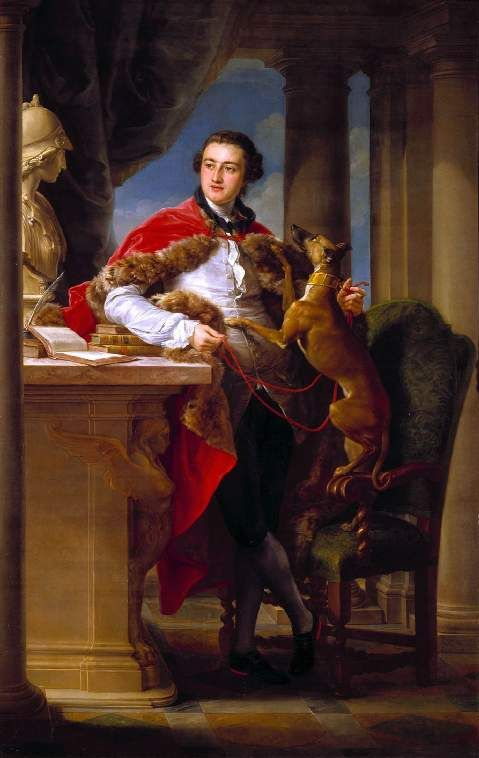
Charles Portrait of the Earl of Northampton by Pompeo Batoni (1708–1787), painted in Rome, 1758. Oil on canvas; Cambridge, Fitzwilliam Museum

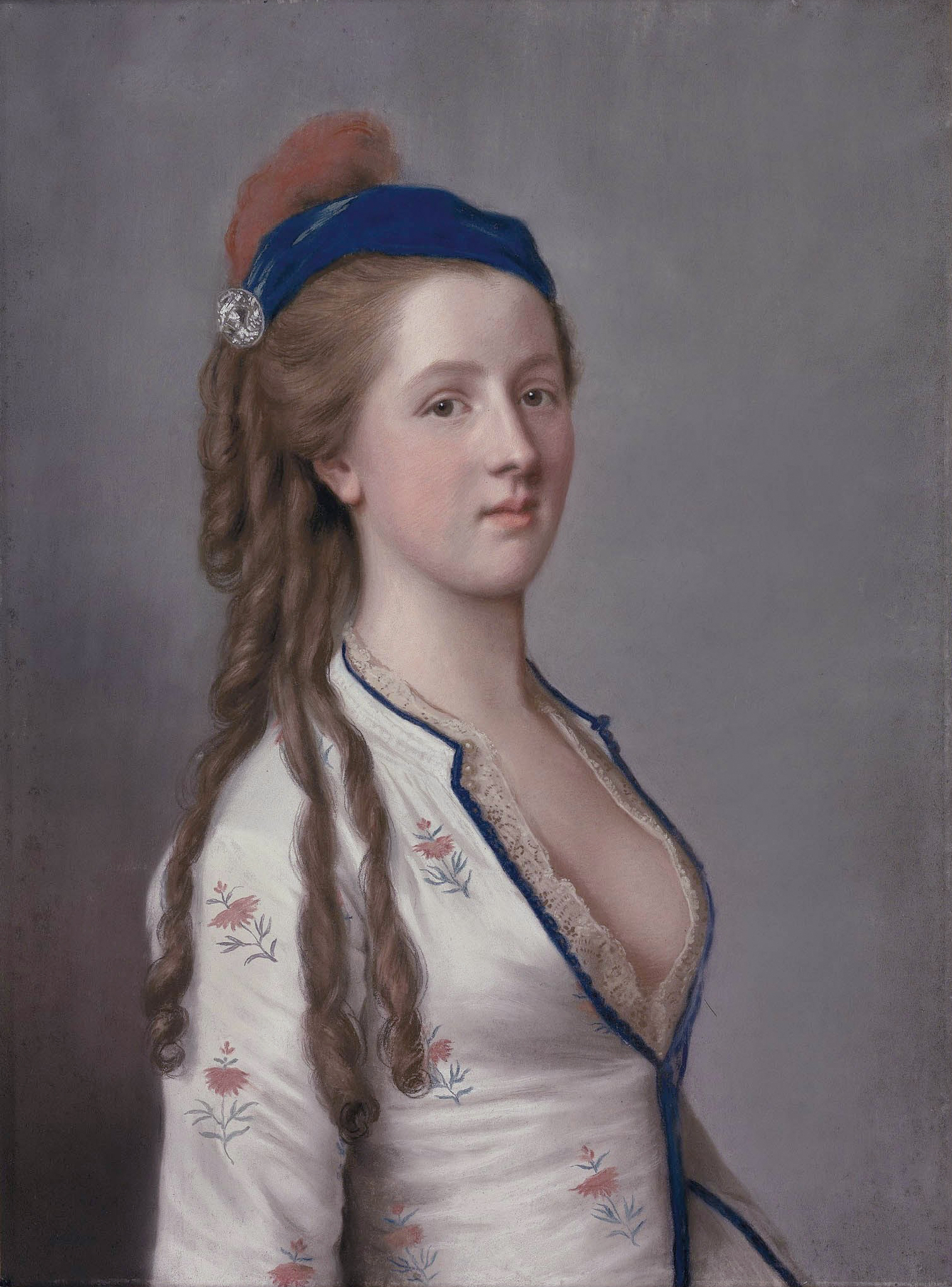
Lady Ann Somerset, Countess of Northampton (attributed to Jean-Étienne Liotard)

Charles Compton, 7th Earl of Northampton, DL (22 July 1737 – 18 October 1763) was a British peer and diplomat.

He was the eldest son of the Hon. Charles Compton, in turn youngest son of George Compton, 4th Earl of Northampton, and his wife Mary, only daughter of Sir Berkeley Lucy, 3rd Baronet. Compton was educated at Westminster School and went then to Christ Church, Oxford. In 1758, he succeeded his uncle George Compton as earl and was elected Recorder of Northampton. He received a Doctor of Civil Law by the University of Oxford in the following year and was nominated a deputy lieutenant for the county of Northamptonshire.

In 1761, during the coronation of King George III the United Kingdom, Compton was the Bearer of the Ivory Rod with the Dove. Subsequently, he was appointed Ambassador Extraordinary and Plenipotentiary to the Republic of Venice with his introduction in May 1763, dying only few months later.

On 13 September 1759, he married Lady Ann Somerset, eldest daughter of Charles Somerset, 4th Duke of Beaufort. Their only child, Elizabeth, married George Cavendish, 1st Earl of Burlington. His wife died at Naples in May 1763, and Compton survived her until October, aged only 26. Both were buried in the family's Northamptonshire vault. He was succeeded in the earldom by his younger brother Spencer.

Diplomatic posts
| Preceded by John Murray as Minister Resident | Ambassador Extraordinary and Plenipotentiary to the Republic of Venice; 1762–1763 | Succeeded by James Wright as Minister Resident |
Peerage of England
| Preceded by George Compton | Earl of Northampton; 5th creation 1758–1763 | Succeeded by Spencer Compton |
