= Portrait of the Earl of Northampton =

Painting by Pompeo Batoni

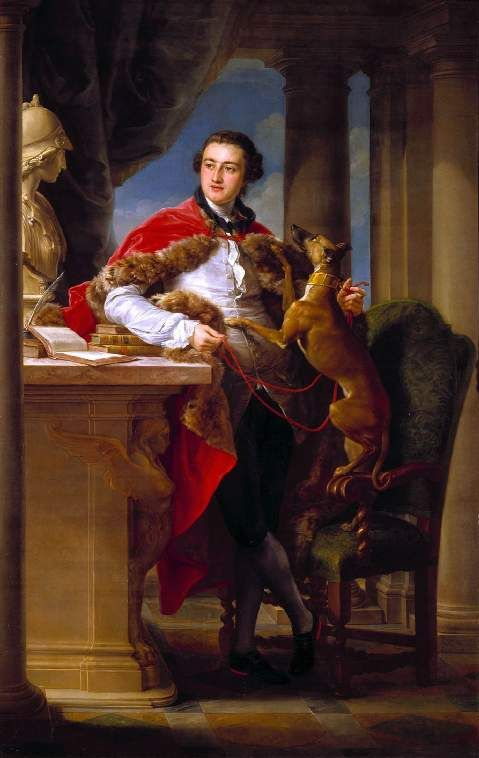
- Artist: Pompeo Batoni
- Year: 1758
- Type: Oil on canvas, portrait painting
- Dimensions: 237.7 cm × 149.2 cm (93.6 in × 58.7 in)
- Location: Fitzwilliam Museum; Cambridge

Portrait of the Earl of Northampton is a 1758 portrait painting by the Italian artist Pompeo Batoni. The sitter was Charles Compton, 7th Earl of Northampton, a young English aristocrat. He is shown against a Neoclassical backdrop referencing Ancient Rome. He is shown with a whippet on the chair beside him. Northampton was short-lived and died five years after the painting at the age of twenty six.

Batoni was a Rome-based painter who specialised in depictions of visiting Grand Tourists, primarily from Great Britain and Ireland. This work, along with Batoni's picture of Wyndham Knatchbull-Wyndham established him as the pre-eminent portraitist of the visiting elite. Northampton also commissioned a history painting from Batoni the same year, the now lost Hector's Farewell to Andromache. Today the painting is in the collection of the Fitzwilliam Museum in Cambridge, having been acquired in 1950.

== Bibliography ==
- Bowron, Edgar Peters & Kerber, Peter Björn. Pompeo Batoni: Prince of Painters in Eighteenth-century Rome. Yale University Press, 2007.
- Walsh, E.G. & Lowe, Mary. The English Whippet. Coch-y-Bonddu Books, 2004.
