= List of diplomats of Great Britain to the Republic of Venice =

Below is an incomplete list of diplomats from Great Britain to the Republic of Venice, specifically Heads of Missions until the abolition of the republic in 1797. It includes envoys from the Kingdom of England before the Union with Scotland of 1707.

== Heads of Missions ==
=== English Ministers Resident ===
- 1604-1610: Henry Wotton
- 1612-1615: Viscount Dorchester
- 1616-1619: Henry Wotton
- 1620 : Vacant
- 1621-1623: Henry Wotton
- 1634-1639: Earl of Denbigh
- 1639-1645: Sir Gilbert Talbot
- 1669-1672: Thomas Belasyse
- 1682–1685: Thomas Hobson
- 1689–1712: G. Broughton a resident diplomat
- 1697–1698: Charles Montagu, 4th Earl of Manchester Ambassador
  - 1702: Sir Lambert Blackwell Envoy Extraordinary

=== Ministers Resident of Great Britain ===
- 1707–1708: Charles Montagu, 4th Earl of Manchester Ambassador
- 1708–1714: Christian Cole Secretary
  - 1713: Charles Mordaunt, 3rd Earl of Peterborough Ambassador
- 1715: Christian Cole Resident
- 1715–1719: Alexander Cunningham Resident
- 1719–1722 and 1727–1736: Colonel Elizeus Burges Resident
- 1736–1744: No diplomatic relations due to "extraordinary distinctions and honours to the Pretender's son"
- 1744–1746: Robert Darcy, 4th Earl of Holderness
- 1746–1753: Sir James Gray Resident
- 1752–1754: Unknown: possibly Consul Smith as resident
- 1754–1765: John Murray
  - 1762–1763: Charles Compton, 7th Earl of Northampton Ambassador
- 1765–1773: Sir James Wright, 1st Baronet, of Venice Resident
  - 1769–1771: Robert Richie in charge in Wright's absence (also in 1775)
- 1773–1789: John Strange Resident (absent from 1786)
- 1786–1790: Robert Richie in charge
- 1789–1791: Sir Francis Vincent, Bt
- 1791–1793: William Lindsay
- 1793: Francis Drake
- 1793–1797: Sir Richard Worsley, Bt

In 1797, the Republic of Venice was abolished and divided by the Treaty of Campo Formio

== Sources ==
- Ord, Melanie (2007). "Venice and Rome in the Addresses and Dispatches of Sir Henry Wotton: First English Embassy to Venice, 1604–1610". The Seventeenth Century. 22 (1): 1–23. doi:10.1080/0268117X.2007.10555584. S2CID 153486675.
