= Sir James Gray, 1st Baronet =

Merchant-burgess of Edinburgh (1667–1722)

Sir James Gray, 1st Baronet, of Denne Hill, East Kent, (7 March 1667 – 27 October 1722), was an armiger, and a merchant-burgess of Edinburgh, who later managed the affairs in London of James Graham, 1st Duke of Montrose.

James Gray was a trader in leather, wine, wool and grain. He is said to have also been a "boxkeeper" and then footman to King James II. From a packet of letters in his own hand (now in the National Archives of Scotland) he managed the affairs in London of the Duke of Montrose, amongst others. In one letter dated 1701 he wrote to the Duke of being kept busy by having to attend Parliament (House) "every morning and every evening".

He was created a Baronet by Queen Anne at Kensington Palace on 5 March 1707, the day before the Act of Union was given Royal Assent. A week later he was made a Burgess of the county of City of Edinburgh by Act of that Council dated 12 March 1707. The Political State of Great Britain, when reporting his death, stated that he had "played a geat hand in the peaceful Union between the two parliaments." Sir James's Arms appear on a brass stall-plate in Westminster Abbey.

In June 1707 Sir James Gray married at St. Nicholas Church, Chiswick Hester née Dodd (5 June 1684 – 31 October 1781) from Kensington, London. They had nine children between March 1708 and July 1718, only four surviving to adulthood, and three of those had no issue:

- Sir James Gray, 2nd Baronet, a diplomat and Privy Councillor. Left two 'natural' children.
- Sir George Gray, 3rd Baronet, a Lieutenant-General. No issue.
- Elizabeth, married 21 October 1747, in Mayfair, John Luke Nichols. Issue unknown.
- Caroline, a Maid-of-Honour to the Princess of Orange, and married Richard Wright, M.D. No issue.

Baronetage of Nova Scotia
New creation	Baronet (of Denne Hill); 1707–1722	Succeeded by James Gray
