= Arthur Paget (diplomat) =

British politician and diplomat (1771–1840)

Sir Arthur Paget
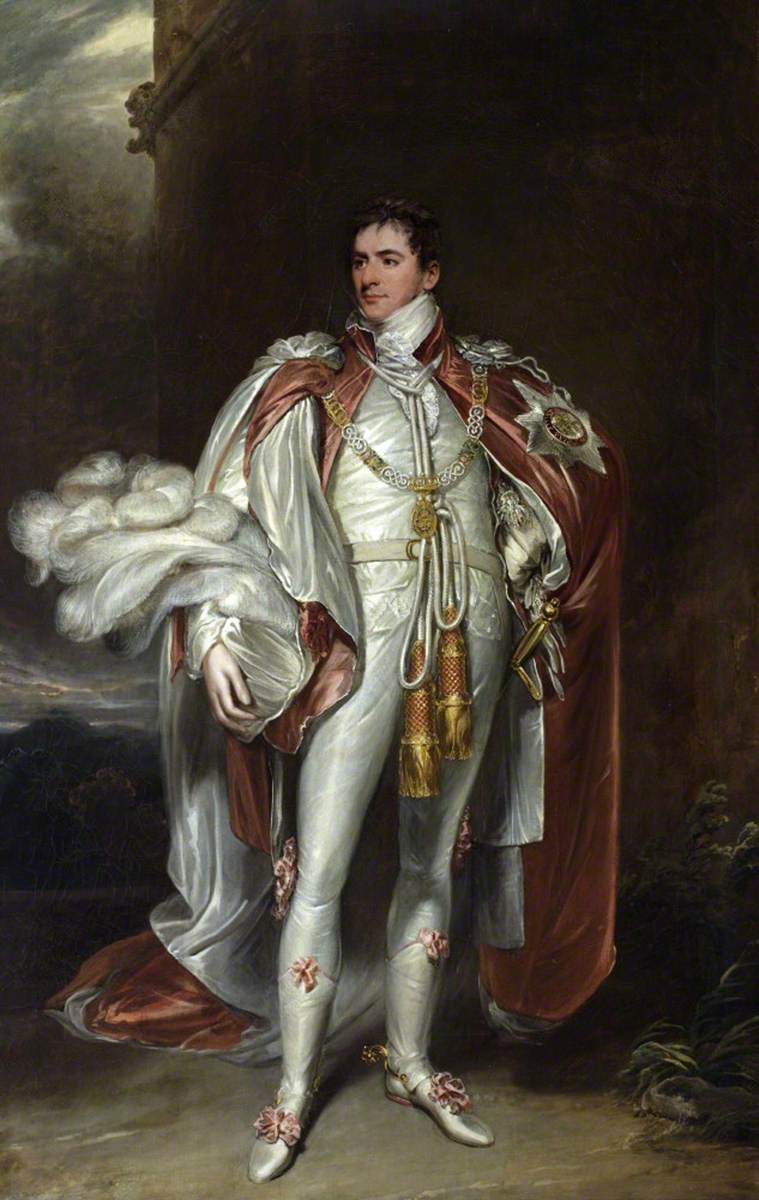
- Portrait by John Hoppner, 1804

British ambassador to the Ottoman Empire
- In office 1807–1809

British Minister to Austria
- In office 1801–1806

British Minister to the Kingdom of Naples
- In office 1800–1801

British minister to Bavaria
- In office 1798–1799

Member of Parliament for Anglesey
- In office 1801-1807

Member of Parliament for Anglesey
- In office 1794-1801

Personal details
- Born: 15 January 1771
- Died: 26 July 1840 (aged 69) London, England
- Spouse: Augusta Parker (m. 1809)
- Children: 7, including Augustus
- Parent: Henry Paget (father)
- Relatives: Henry Paget (brother); William Paget (brother); Edward Paget (brother); Charles Paget (brother); Berkeley Paget (brother)

Sir Arthur Paget, GCB, PC (15 January 1771 – 26 July 1840) was a British politician and diplomat.

== Life ==
Arthur Paget was the third son of Henry Paget, 1st Earl of Uxbridge and his wife Jane Champagné daughter of Arthur Champagné, Dean of Clonmacnoise in Ireland. He was a younger brother of Henry Paget, 1st Marquess of Anglesey and the older brother of Sir Edward Paget, an army officer and colonial governor.

He was educated at Westminster School and Christ Church, Oxford, but did not take a degree. At Oxford, Paget formed a close relationship with Cyril Jackson, Dean of Christ Church.

=== Diplomatic career ===
In 1791, he entered the British diplomatic service. J. M. Rigg described Paget as 'a man of easy charm who made his way with little difficulty up the diplomatic ladder, assisted by his moderate whiggery.' In 1794, he was elected as Member of Parliament for Anglesey. He nominally represented this constituency for 13 years, though usually abroad. (He was also appointed Major-Commandant of the Anglesey Militia on 20 February 1795 and promoted to Lieutenant-Colonel on 10 March 1798, but had vacated the command by 1803.) In 1794, he was sent as Envoy-extraordinary to Berlin to remind King Frederick William II of his obligations to Holland, a service in which Lord Malmesbury the ambassador commended him for his tact.

His next appointment was as Envoy Extraordinary to the Elector Palatine and the Perpetual Diet at Regensburg in 1798, followed by Envoy Extraordinary and Minister Plenipotentiary first at Naples in 1800 and then at Vienna the following year. He remained at Vienna until 1806, being nicknamed "The Emperor" on account of his extravagance.

A dispatch in 1802, following Napoleon's creation of the Confederation of the Rhine predicted the hegemony of Prussia within Germany. He was materially contributed to the creation of the Third Coalition, and reported its collapse following the Battle of Austerlitz (2 December 1805), a dispatch that is said to have hastened the death of William Pitt the Younger (23 January 1806).

After his recall from Austria, he was sent to the Ottoman Porte in 1807, where he told the Sultan of a secret clause in the Treaty of Tilsit adverse to his interests. However, he was unable to detach the Ottoman Empire from its French Alliance. He was recalled in May 1809 and awarded a pension of £2,000.

=== Retirement ===
Paget had been made a Privy Councillor and Knight of the Bath, both in 1804, and was given a GCB in 1815. In 1808, he eloped with Lady Augusta Fane, then the wife of Lord Boringdon, and married her the following year, as soon as her divorce took place. They had several children, including Sir Augustus Berkeley Paget, who followed his father as a diplomat. He occupied time in his retirement as an agriculturalist and yachtsman.

=== Scandal ===
On 18 May 1808, Paget eloped with Augusta Jane Parker, Lady Boringdon (née Fane), daughter of John Fane, 10th Earl of Westmorland, and wife of John Parker, 2nd Baron Boringdon (later first Earl of Morley from 1815). Paget married Lady Augusta on 16 February 1809, two days after her divorce from Lord Boringdon by an Act of Parliament.

=== Family ===
Paget and Lady Augusta (née Fane) had issue:

- Agnes Charlotte Paget (d. 10 Mar 1858), married her first cousin Lord George Paget, son of Henry Paget, 1st Marquess of Anglesey
- Stewart Henry Paget (b. 30 May 1811 - d. 4 Aug 1869)
- Laura Caroline Jane Paget (b. c 1821 - d. 9 Dec 1871), married first cousin once removed Harry Chichester, 2nd Baron Templemore
- Cecil Augustus Paget (b. 1821 - d. 1843)
- Amelius Paget (b. 1821 - d. 1843)
- Rosa Maria Paget (b. c 1822)
- Rt. Hon. Sir Augustus Berkeley Paget (b. 16 Apr 1823 - d. 11 Jul 1896), married Countess Walburga Ehrengarde Helena von Hohenthal

He died on 26 July 1840 at his home at Grosvenor Street, London.

== Notes ==
Parliament of Great Britain
Preceded by Hon. William Paget	Member of Parliament for Anglesey; 1794–1801	Succeeded by Parliament of the United Kingdom
Parliament of the United Kingdom
Preceded by Parliament of Great Britain	Member of Parliament for Anglesey; 1801–1807	Succeeded by Hon. Berkeley Paget
Diplomatic posts
Preceded by William Elliot	British minister to Bavaria; 1798–1799	Succeeded by Francis Drake (diplomat)
Preceded by Sir William Hamilton	British Minister to the Kingdom of Naples; 1800–1801	Succeeded by William Drummond
Preceded by Gilbert, Lord Minto	British Minister to Austria; 1801–1806	Succeeded by Robert Adair
Preceded by Charles Arbuthnot	British ambassador to the Ottoman Empire; 1807–1809	Succeeded by Sir Robert Adair
