= Gray baronets =

Baronetcy in the Baronetage of the United Kingdom

There have been two baronetcies created for persons with the surname Gray, one in the Baronetage of Nova Scotia and one in the Baronetage of the United Kingdom. One creation is extant as of 2007.

The Gray Baronetcy, of Denne Hill, a property in east Kent, was created in the Baronetage of Nova Scotia on 5 March 1707 for James Gray. The second Baronet was admitted to the Privy Council in 1769. The title became extinct on the death of the third Baronet in 1773.

The Gray Baronetcy, of Tunstall Manor, in the parish of Hart in the County of Durham, was created in the Baronetage of the United Kingdom on 7 July 1917 for the shipbuilder and steel magnate William Gray. He was Chairman of William Gray and Co Ltd, shipbuilders, and the founder of the South Durham Steel and Iron Company Ltd. He served as High Sheriff of Durham in 1909. The second Baronet was high sheriff in 1938 and the third served that office in 1998. Tunstall Manor which the first Baronet built in 1899 was demolished in 1926 and latterly the family seat was Eggleston Hall

== Gray baronets, of Denne Hill (1707) ==
- Sir James Gray, 1st Baronet (died 1722)
- Sir James Gray, 2nd Baronet (c. 1708–1773)
- Sir George Gray, 3rd Baronet (c. 1710–1773)

== Gray baronets, of Tunstall Manor (1917) ==
- Sir William Cresswell Gray, 1st Baronet (1867–1924)
- Sir William Gray, 2nd Baronet (1895–1978)
- Sir William Hume Gray, 3rd Baronet (born 1955)

The heir apparent is the present holder's son William John Cresswell Gray (born 1986).
