= Whippet =

British breed of dog

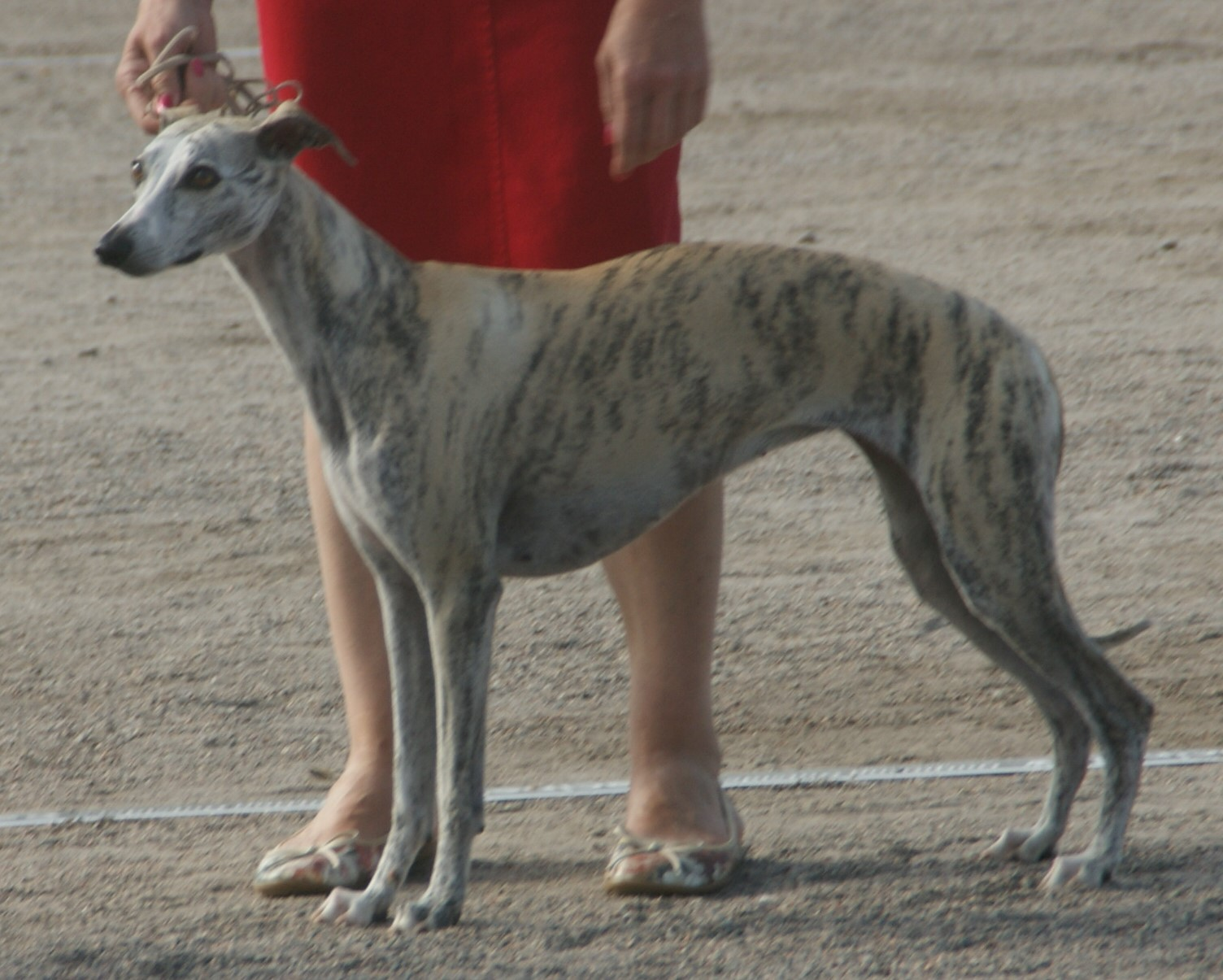
- A brindle Whippet
- Other names: Snap dog (archaic)
- Origin: United Kingdom
Traits
Height	Males	47–51 cm (18.5–20 in)
	Females	44–47 cm (17.5–18.5 in)
- Weight: typical 11–18 kg (24–40 lb)
- Coat: fine, dense, short
- Colour: FCI: immaterial (not important); UK: any except merle
- Litter size: 1–10, average 6.1
Kennel club standards
- The Kennel Club: standard
- Fédération Cynologique Internationale: standard

The Whippet is a British breed of sighthound. It closely resembles the Greyhound and the smaller Italian Greyhound, and is intermediate between them in size. In the nineteenth century, it was sometimes called "the poor man's racehorse". It is commonly kept as a companion dog, for competitive showing or for amateur racing, and may participate in various dog sports, including lure coursing, agility, and flyball. It has the fastest running speed within its weight and size range, and is believed to have the fastest idle-to-running acceleration of any dog.

Whippets are characterized by their gentle, affectionate, and calm temperament. While typically relaxed and serene at home, they exhibit high energy and excitement when outdoors. Originally bred as hunting and racing dogs, Whippets have a strong prey drive, which may lead them to chase small animals.

Whippets have a minimal-shedding coat that is easy to manage due to its short, smooth texture and lack of an undercoat. However, their short coat and low body fat make them particularly sensitive to cold temperatures, so they may require extra protection, such as a dog jacket, in cooler weather. The breed is generally healthy, benefiting from a strong, athletic constitution, and is free from many hereditary issues seen in other breeds.

The concept of greyhound-type dogs of various sizes—large, medium, and small—has been well-documented in hunting manuals and natural history works dating back to the Middle Ages. In the early 15th century, Edward of Norwich, 2nd Duke of York, translated and expanded the late 14th-century French Livre de chasse, a comprehensive manual on instructions for hunting with dogs. In his work, he highlighted the benefits of keeping "great", "middle", and "small-sized Greyhounds" for hunting different kinds of game. Later, in the 16th century, English physician and academic John Caius referenced both greater and lesser types of Leporarius, Grehounde (Greyhound) in his book De Canibus Britannicis. Notably, he described a type connected to the Whippet: the tumbler, a 'lesser sort of mungrell greyhounde' that was an excellent warren dog used for catching rabbits. The tumbler was also recorded by Thomas Brown, a Scottish curator and editor, in the early 19th century.

== Name ==
The name "Whippet" is derived from an early seventeenth-century term, now obsolete, meaning "to move briskly."

In the Victorian era, English writers began describing an emerging modern breed of Whippet, also known as the snap-dog, a term derived from their tendency to readily 'snap up' nearby prey due to their naturally high prey drive. This breed was primarily developed for catching rabbits, coursing competitions, straight racing, and the growing trend of show fancy.

== History ==
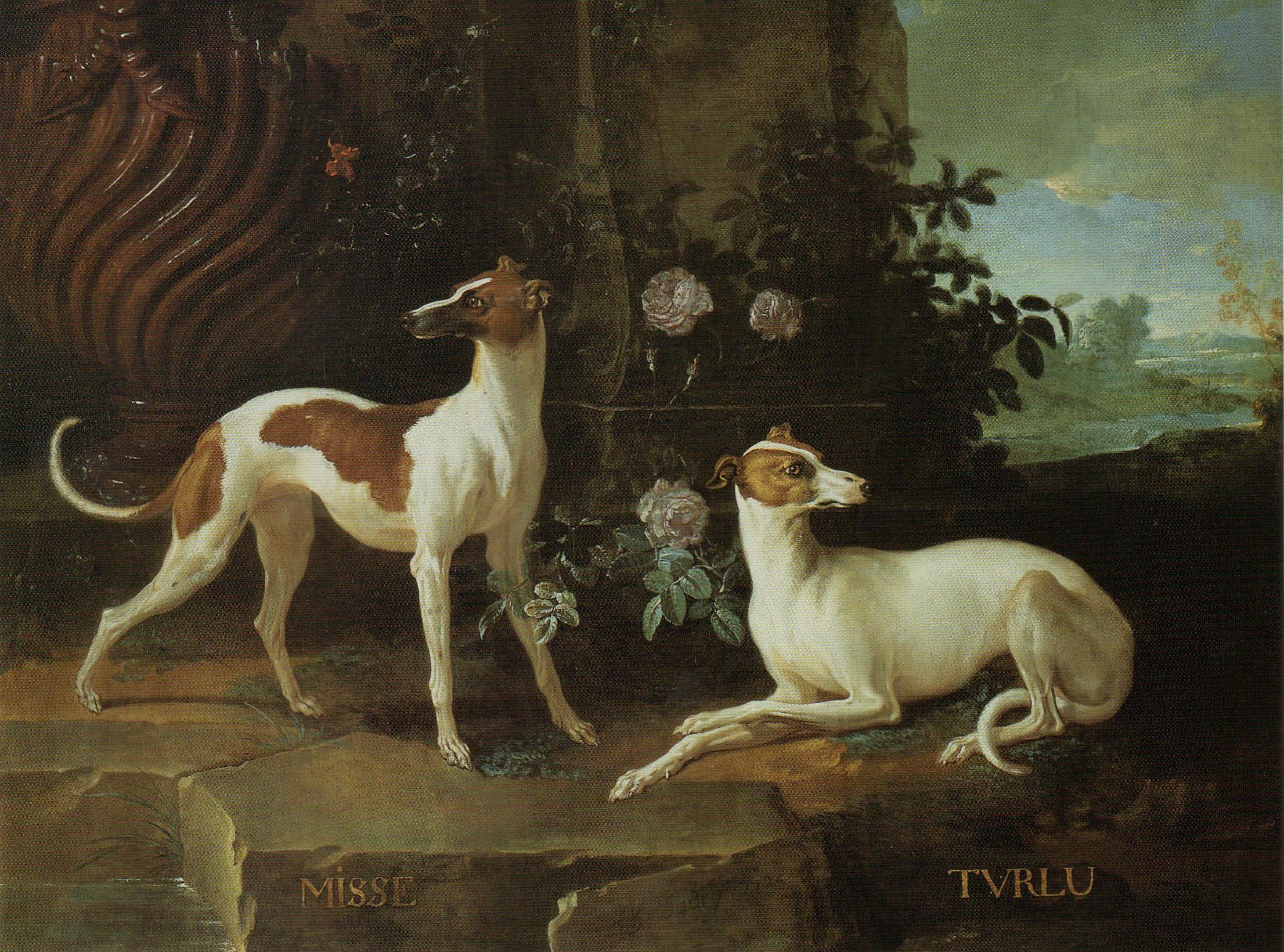
Misse and Turlu, Two small Greyhounds Belonging to Louis XV, by Jean-Baptiste Oudry

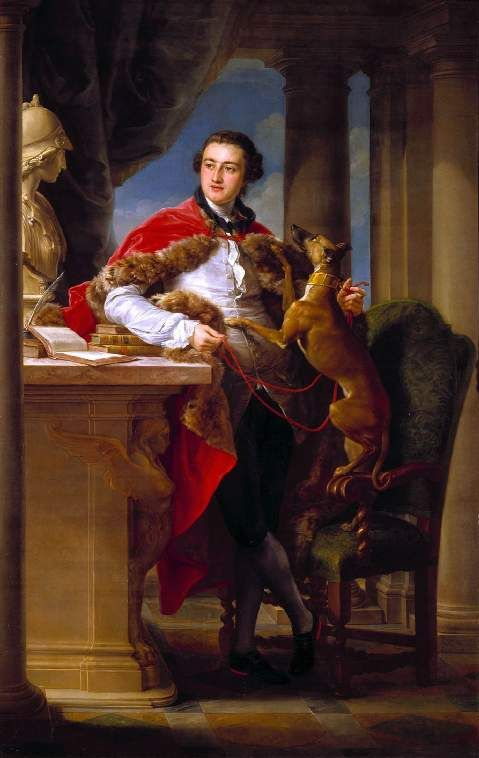
Portrait of the Earl of Northampton by Pompeo Batoni, 1758, featuring a dog that appears to be an early form of Whippet.

Whippets, like all other sighthounds, were bred to hunt using their sight-driven prey instinct, coursing game in open areas at high speeds. Numerous representations of small, sighthound-like hunting dogs can be found in Ancient Egyptian artworks dating back thousands of years, possibly depicting ancient forms of the Greyhound, Basenji, Pharaoh Hound, or Saluki. In medieval England, a small greyhound-type breed became popular as a ratting dog. The first written use of the word 'whippet' in English, referring to a type of dog, was in 1610. In a painting by Jean-Baptiste Oudry (1686–1755) of two dogs named ‘Misse’ and ‘Turlu’, presented to Louis XV, the dogs depicted were either Whippets or another small, smooth-coated sighthound, but they were likely an early form of the Whippet. Oudry also completed a second painting of Misse with a different, non-sighthound breed of dog. A 1758 painting by Pompeo Batoni, Portrait of Charles Compton, 7th Earl of Northampton, also features a similar, whippet-like dog.

In the 19th century, Whippet racing was a popular sport in parts of England. The breed was highly regarded in the northern parts of England, as well as in Wales, but was generally disregarded in the rest of the country. At the time, there were two varieties of Whippet: one type had a smoother coat and was more popular in Lancashire, Yorkshire, and the Midlands, later becoming the modern Whippet. The second form had a rougher coat due to crossbreeding with Bedlington Terriers. This type was more popular in Durham and Northumberland, and was frequently referred to as a 'rabbit dog'. Early specimens were taken from the racetrack by dog fanciers of the time and later exported around the world. John Taylor, an English writer, noted that "In all the shapes and forms of dogges; of all which there are but two sorts that are useful to man's profits, which two are the mastiffe and the little curre, whippet, or house-dogge; all the rest are for pleasure and recreation."

The modern Whippet seemingly came into its own in 1891 when The Kennel Club officially recognized the breed. This recognition allowed Whippets to compete in dog shows and have their pedigrees recorded. In the United States, the Whippet was recognized three years earlier, in 1888, by the American Kennel Club (AKC). The breed arrived in the U.S. from England, brought by mill operators, with the first populations established in Massachusetts. According to the AKC ranking, the Whippet has consistently ranked within the top 60 breeds over the past decade, with a ranking of 50th place in 2024.

In 1964, the Whippet Ch. Courtenay Fleetfoot of Pennyworth won Best in Show at the Westminster Kennel Club Dog Show. Later, in 1992, Pencloe Dutch Gold won best in show at Crufts, followed by Cobyco Call the Tune in 2004 and Ch. Collooney Tartan Tease in 2018. In 2011, the female Whippet GCh. Starline's Chanel was named Hound Group Show Dog of the Year by the Westminster Kennel Club.

== Description ==
=== Appearance ===
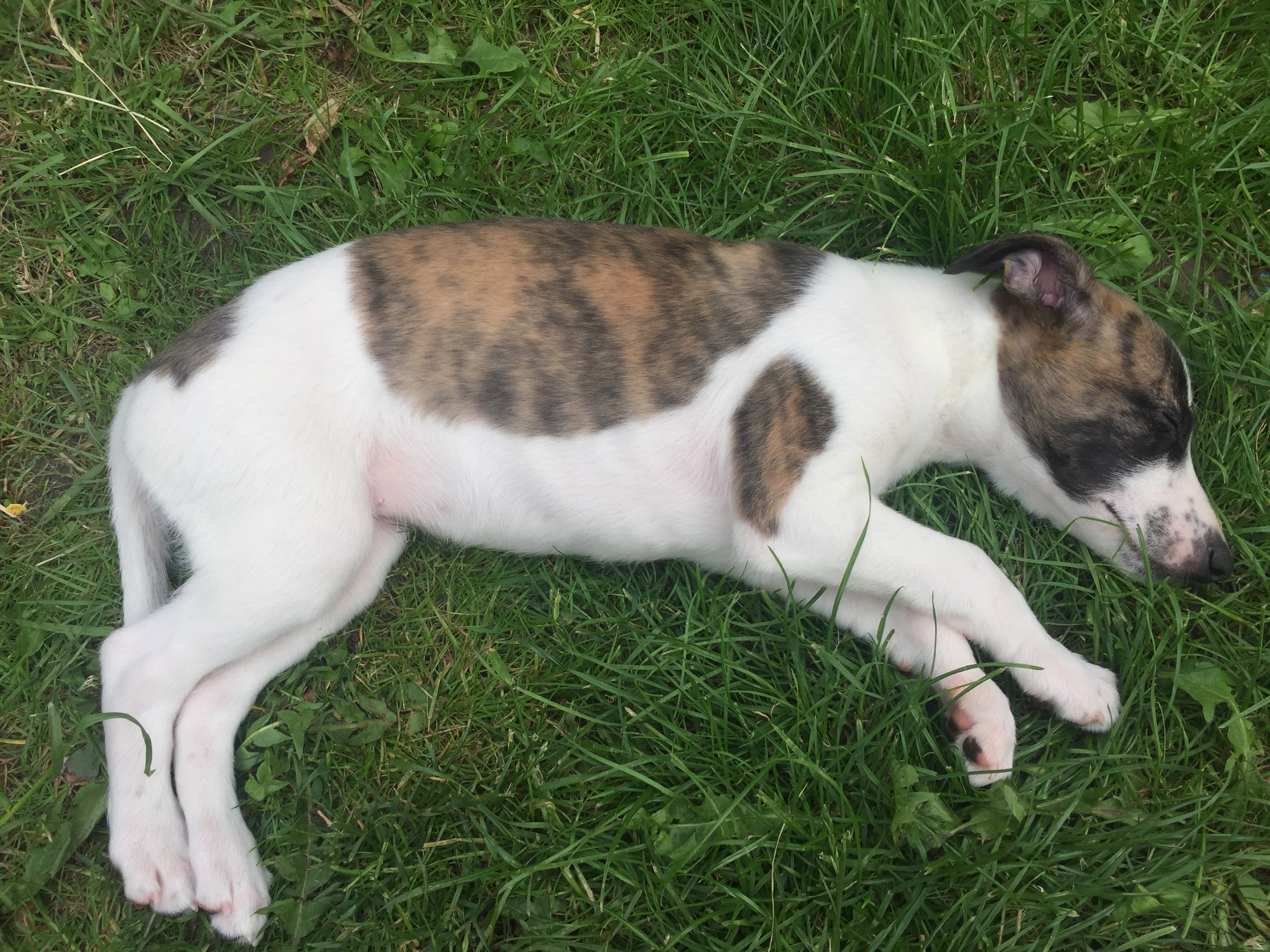
Brindle and white Whippet puppy

The Whippet is a medium-sized dog with a sleek, aerodynamic body typical of sighthounds, adapted for speed and agility. It has a deep chest for efficient lung capacity, long, slender legs, and a narrow, muscular build characteristic of breeds developed for running. The ideal height for a female Whippet is 44 to 47 cm (17.5 to 18.5 in), and for a male Whippet 47 to 51 cm (18.5 to 20 in). The standards of the American Kennel Club and Canadian Kennel Club allow for larger animals, with an upper limit of 55 cm (21.5 in) for bitches and 57 cm (22.5 in) for dogs. Because colour is considered immaterial in judging Whippets, they come in a wide variety of colours and marking patterns, ranging from solid black to solid white, with red, fawn, brindle, blue, or cream. In 2019, The Kennel Club announced that it would no longer accept registrations for merle Whippets, as it is not a naturally occurring colour in the breed.

The coat is short, smooth, and close-fitting, contributing to the breed's streamlined appearance. Due to their short coat and low body fat, Whippets are not well-insulated against cold temperatures. While they are well-suited for indoor living due to their minimal grooming needs and low shedding, they may require additional protection, such as a coat or sweater, when exposed to cold weather.

=== Temperament ===
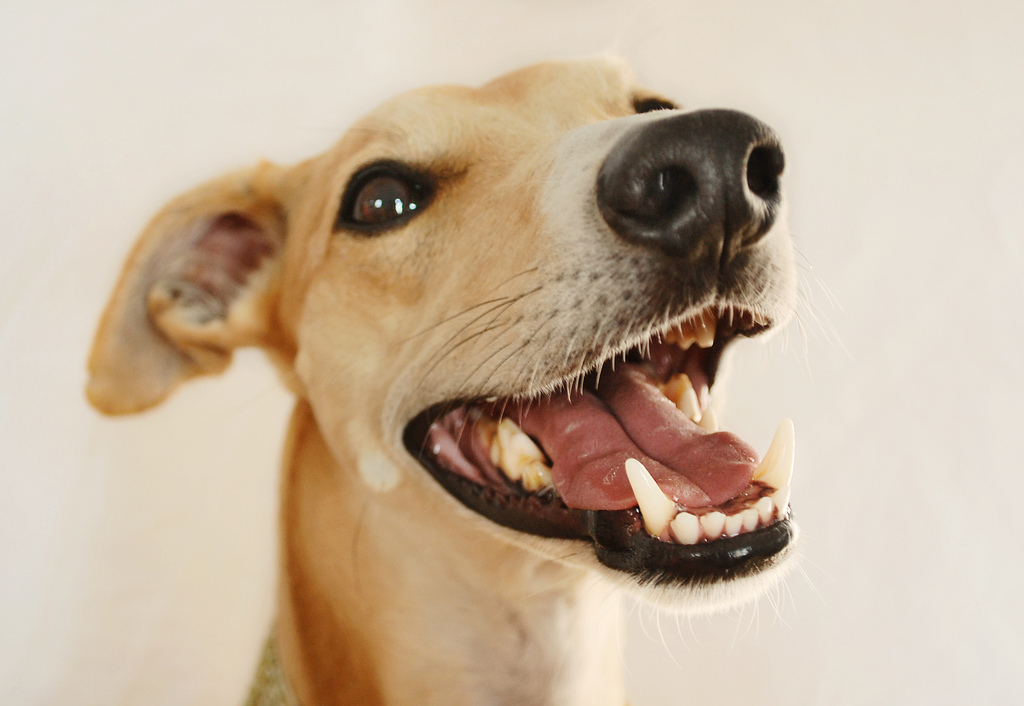
Whippets are known for their loving natures.

Whippets are quiet and reserved, but they also exhibit a playful side and require regular exercise to maintain their physical and mental health. They are generally gentle dogs and are often content to spend much of the day relaxing. The American Kennel Club (AKC) describes them as "quiet and dignified in their owner's living room" and says they make "excellent house dogs." Despite their calm nature indoors, they enjoy outdoor activities, especially short bursts of explosive running that allow them to reach high speeds. These brief, intense sprints are followed by long periods of rest, reflecting their energetic profile and need for recovery. They have been called a "poor man's racehorse" by the colliers in Lancashire and Yorkshire.

The Whippet will form a strong bond and devotion to its owner and, as such, can often suffer from separation anxiety, like many other breeds when left alone. Though not prone to excessive barking, Whippets will occasionally vocalize in the presence of intruders, making them passable watchdogs, similar to other small-to-medium dogs. However, a Whippet is unlikely to attack or guard against anyone due to their gentle and often shy demeanor, preferring to retreat rather than confront danger. While their gentle demeanor makes them a good choice for households with children or other pets, Whippets possess a highly developed prey drive. This instinct, though manageable with proper training and socialization, can make them prone to chasing small animals, such as cats, rabbits, or squirrels, especially in uncontrolled environments. Owners should take care during walks or when allowing them off-leash in unenclosed areas.

=== Speed and gait ===
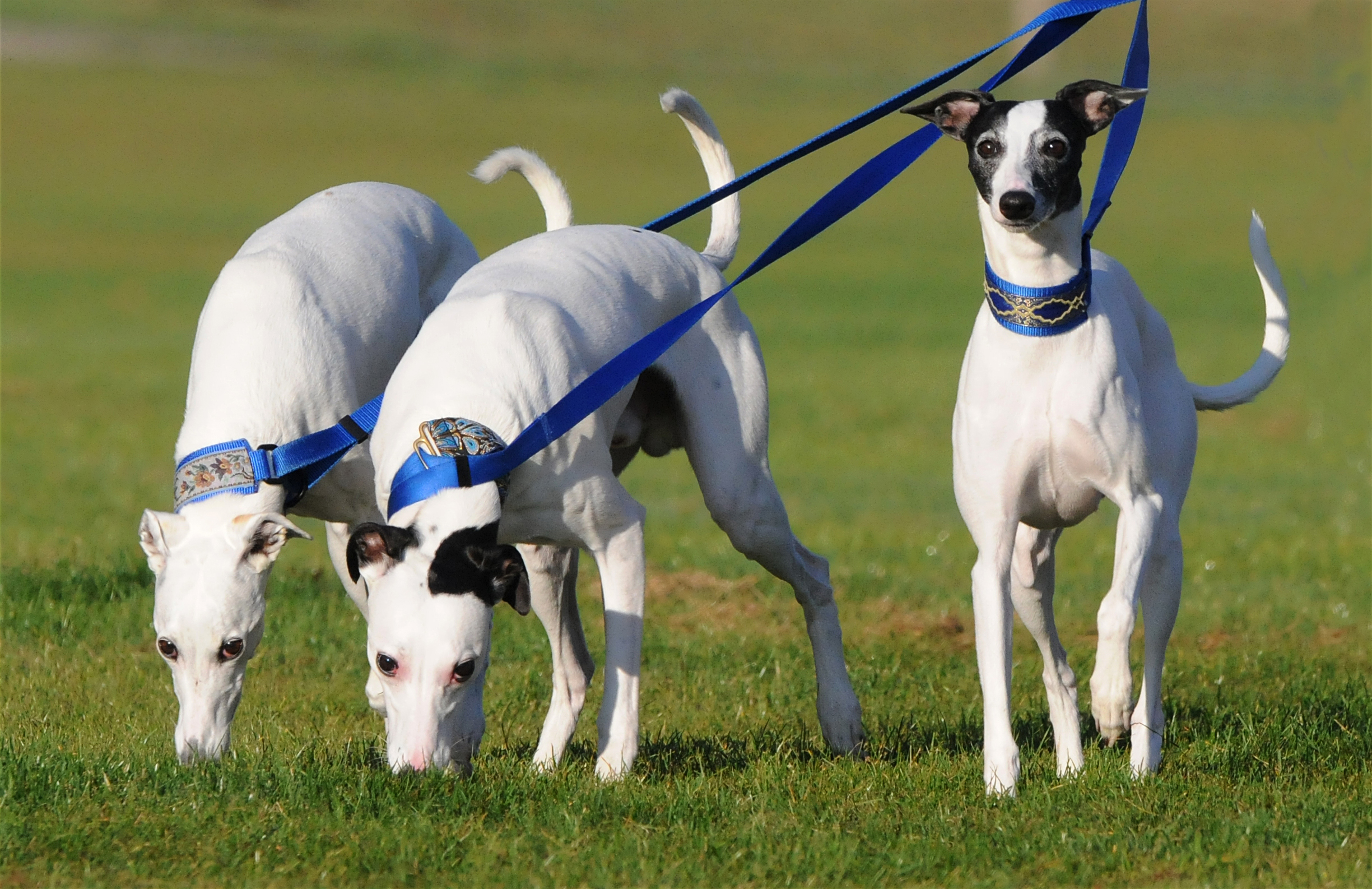
A trio of racing Whippets

Whippets are known as the fastest dogs of their weight class, capable of achieving speeds of up to 56 km/h (35 mph), due to their ability to run in a double suspension gallop. This distinctive gait, in which all four legs are off the ground twice during each stride—once when fully extended and again when tucked under the body—allows for maximum speed and efficiency. Combined with their muscular build, this running style enhances their agility and athleticism, making them highly skilled competitors in racing and field trials.

== Health ==
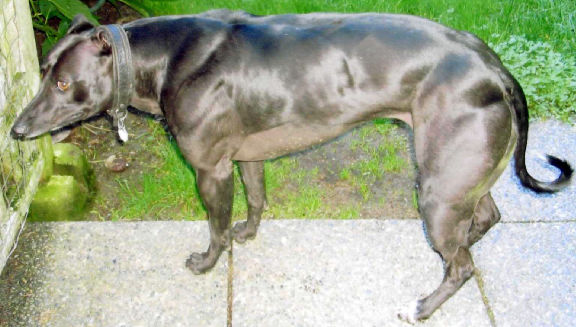
A 'Bully Whippet'

The Whippet is a generally healthy breed, with a robust constitution. Having been bred for coursing, working, and racing for many years, it has maintained a structurally sound build. This long history of selective breeding has helped it avoid many of the physical exaggerations that often lead to health issues in other breeds. As a result, the Whippet is typically free from the common hereditary conditions found in more exaggerated dog types, making it a relatively low-maintenance breed in terms of health.

The Whippet, like other sighthounds, is intolerant of barbiturate anaesthetics. This is partly due to its low body fat concentration, which affects its ability to metabolize these anaesthetics. Additionally, the Whippet’s liver is not well-equipped to process barbiturates, making it more susceptible to adverse reactions during anaesthesia.

A 2024 UK study found a life expectancy of 13.4 years for the breed compared to an average of 12.7 years for purebreeds and 12 years for crossbreeds. They are generally healthy, and are not prone to the frequent ear infections, skin allergies, or digestive problems that can afflict other breeds. Genetic eye defects, though quite rare, have been noted in the breed. Hip dysplasia is rare in Whippets, with only 1.2% of 161 evaluations performed by the Orthopedic Foundation for Animals being determined as dysplastic.

The Whippet's heart is notably large and slow-beating, often exhibiting arrhythmic or even intermittent patterns when the dog is at rest. This trait can occasionally alarm owners or veterinarians unfamiliar with the breed. During exercise, however, the Whippet's heart demonstrates a regular and efficient rhythm, supporting its exceptional athletic abilities. A health survey conducted by The Kennel Club revealed that cardiac issues are the second leading cause of mortality in the breed, highlighting the importance of regular veterinary check-ups to monitor heart health. Heart failure is particularly common among Whippets in their senior years, with mitral valve disease (MVD) being one of the most prevalent heart conditions affecting the breed. MVD involves the weakening and deformation of the mitral valve, preventing it from closing tightly, which leads to mitral regurgitation (MR) and increased strain on the heart. While many Whippets exhibit heart murmurs, distinguishing functional murmurs from those associated with MR can be challenging, as functional murmurs often occur in healthy, athletic dogs. The study indicated that additional evaluation methods, such as echocardiography, are necessary to differentiate between functional murmurs and murmurs indicative of MVD in this population.

A 2007 study identified a myostatin mutation specific to the Whippet that is strongly associated with its athletic performance. Whippets with a single copy of this mutation are generally unaffected, while those with two copies develop disproportionately large musculature and are referred to as "Bully Whippets". Despite their unusual appearance, bully Whippets experience no significant health issues beyond those typical of the breed, although they may be slightly more prone to muscle cramping. Interestingly, this mutation has not been observed in Greyhounds, other sighthound breeds, or heavily muscled dogs such as Bulldogs, Rottweilers, or American Staffordshire Terriers.

== Racing ==
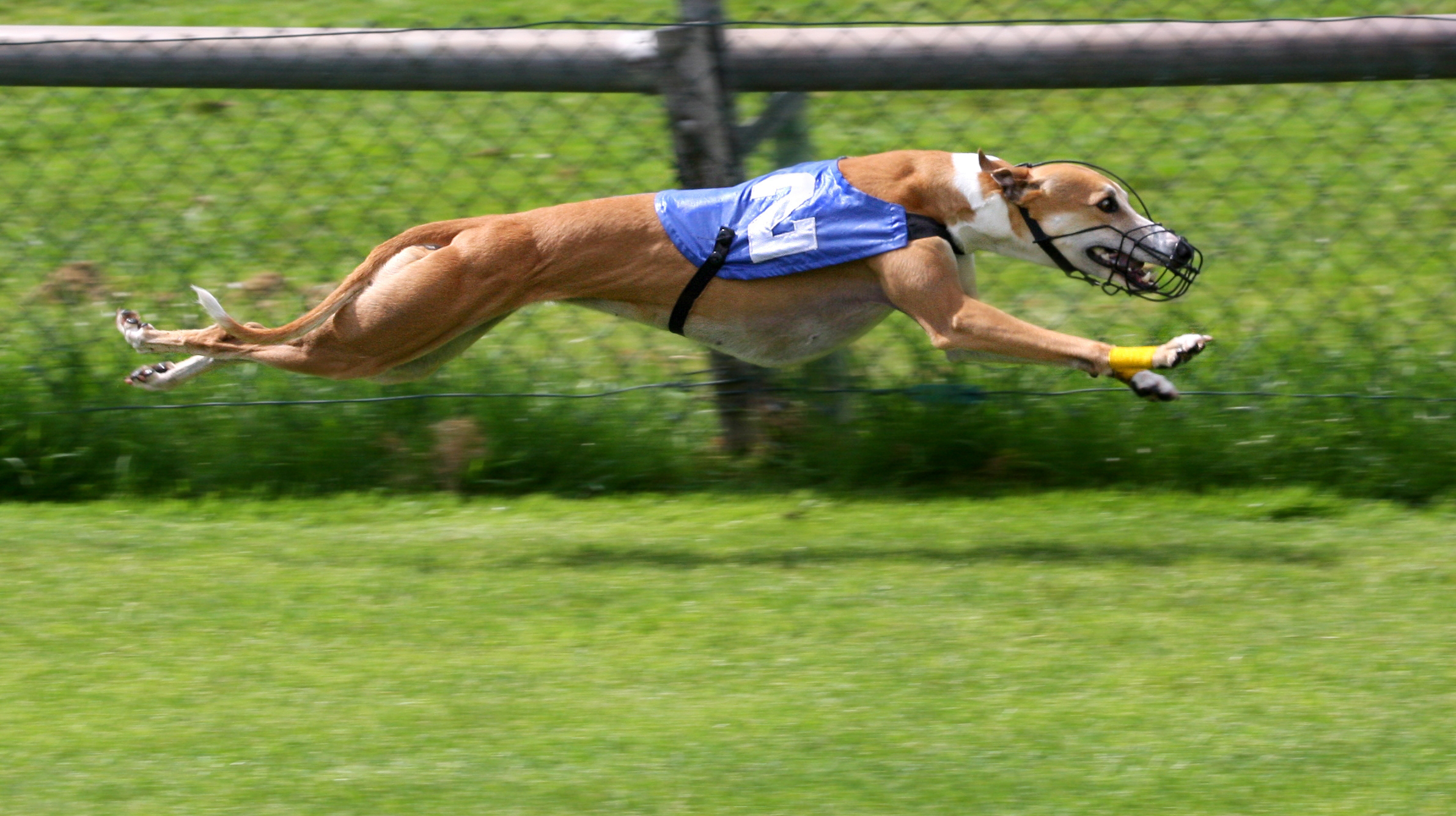
Full extension

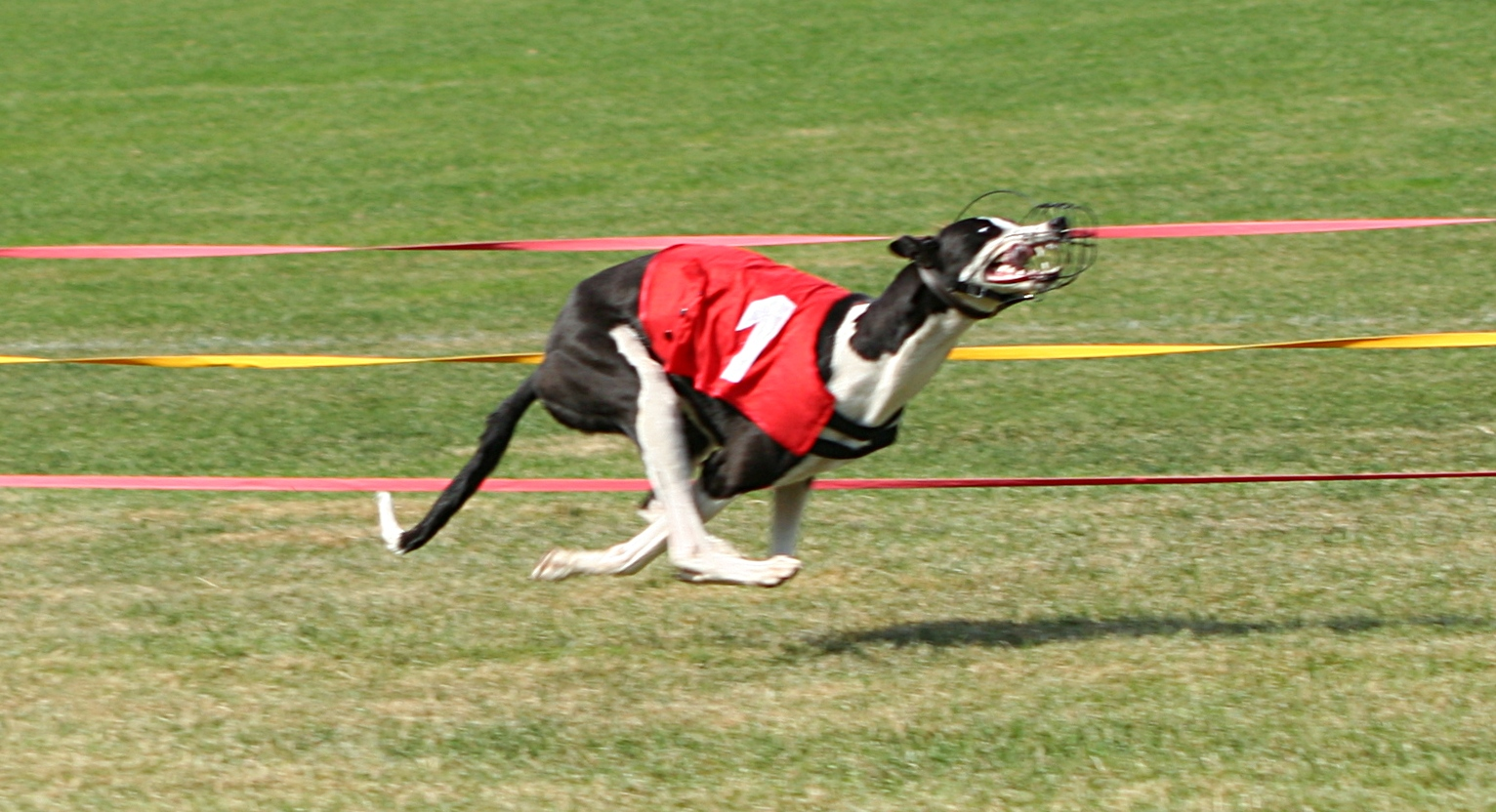
Full contraction

The two suspensions of the double suspension gallop, as demonstrated by racing Greyhounds

Dog racing was originally an extension of hare coursing. Whippets began to be bred to race in the mid-nineteenth century and became popular for racing. The first form of the sport was a rudimentary version of coursing known as 'ragging', and dogs who participated were said to be 'trained to the rag'. Dogs were kept on a leash by a person known as a slip, who was often also the race judge. The slip would release the dogs from their collars at the same time, and they would race towards their owners, who were standing at the opposite end of the track waving towels to encourage the dogs to run toward them.

Whippet rags were a popular Sunday event in the north and Midlands at the time. There were also international events; in Australia, at a track known as Gurney's Paddock, races with more than 300 Whippets were held every Saturday, and three nights a week at the White City track. Eventually, the sport evolved, and dogs were divided into four groups: those who hunted rabbits, which was not governed by rules; those who coursed hares, for which a set of rules was established; those trained to the rag; and those trained to chase a mechanical lure in a fashion similar to Greyhound races. Few of the Whippets in any of the four groups were purebred, as maintaining a purebred bloodline was not considered as important as breeding dogs that could win races. Many racing dogs were part-terrier, part-Greyhound, or part-Lurcher.

In 1967, the British Whippet Racing Association was established to introduce reforms and standardize race rules and procedures for races involving non-purebred Whippets. A year later, viewing the non-purebred dogs as a threat, the Whippet Club Racing Association was established to regulate racing exclusively for purebred Whippets.
