= Pietro Fabris (painter) =

Italian painter

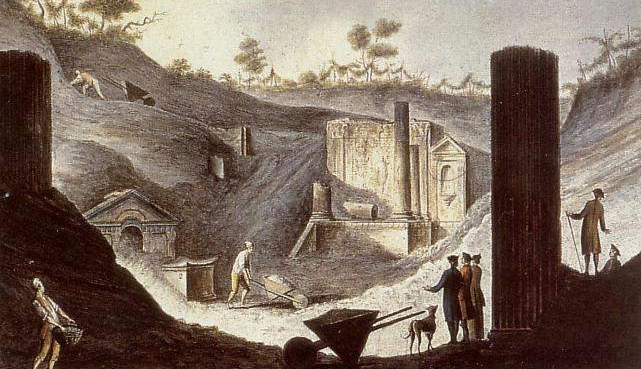
Uncovering Ruins of Temple of Isis at Pompeii

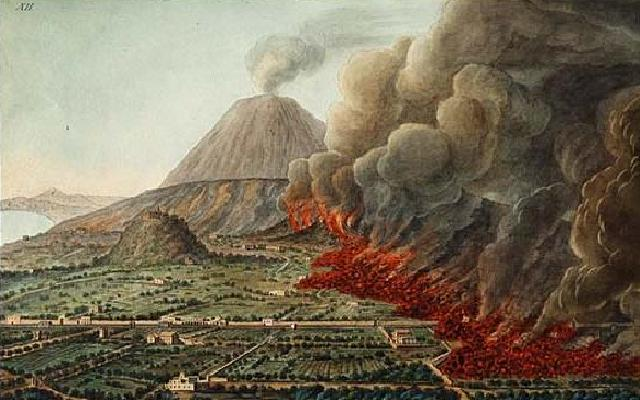
Phlegrean Fields after Eruption of Vesuvius 1760-1761

Pietro Fabris (active 1740 – 1792) was a painter of Italian descent, active in England and Naples. Pietro is best known for work he completed for the dilettante geologist, the diplomat Sir William Hamilton, which included a number of engravings based on his paintings that depicted contemporary volcanic activity collected in two books, Observations on Mount Vesuvius, Mount Etna, &c. (London, 1774) and Campi Phlegraei: Observations on the Volcanoes of the Two Sicilies (Naples, 1776). In other works he produced for sale, he painted Bamboccianti scenes, genre paintings of local folk in native garb at work or play.

The biography of Fabris is poorly documented. He is suspected to have been born in England to a Venice-trained stage set designer called Jacobo Fabris. Pietro, as a young man, was patronized by the diplomat Hamilton to accompany him and visually reproduce for him on his jaunts to visit the volcanic sites in Mount Etna, Mount Vesuvius, and Lipari islands. His paintings and drawings were exhibited in 1768 in the London Free Society and in 1772 in the London Society of Artists of Great Britain. Fabris became acquainted with painter Antonio Joli in Naples.
