= Sir James Gray, 2nd Baronet =

The Right Honourable Sir James Gray Bt KB
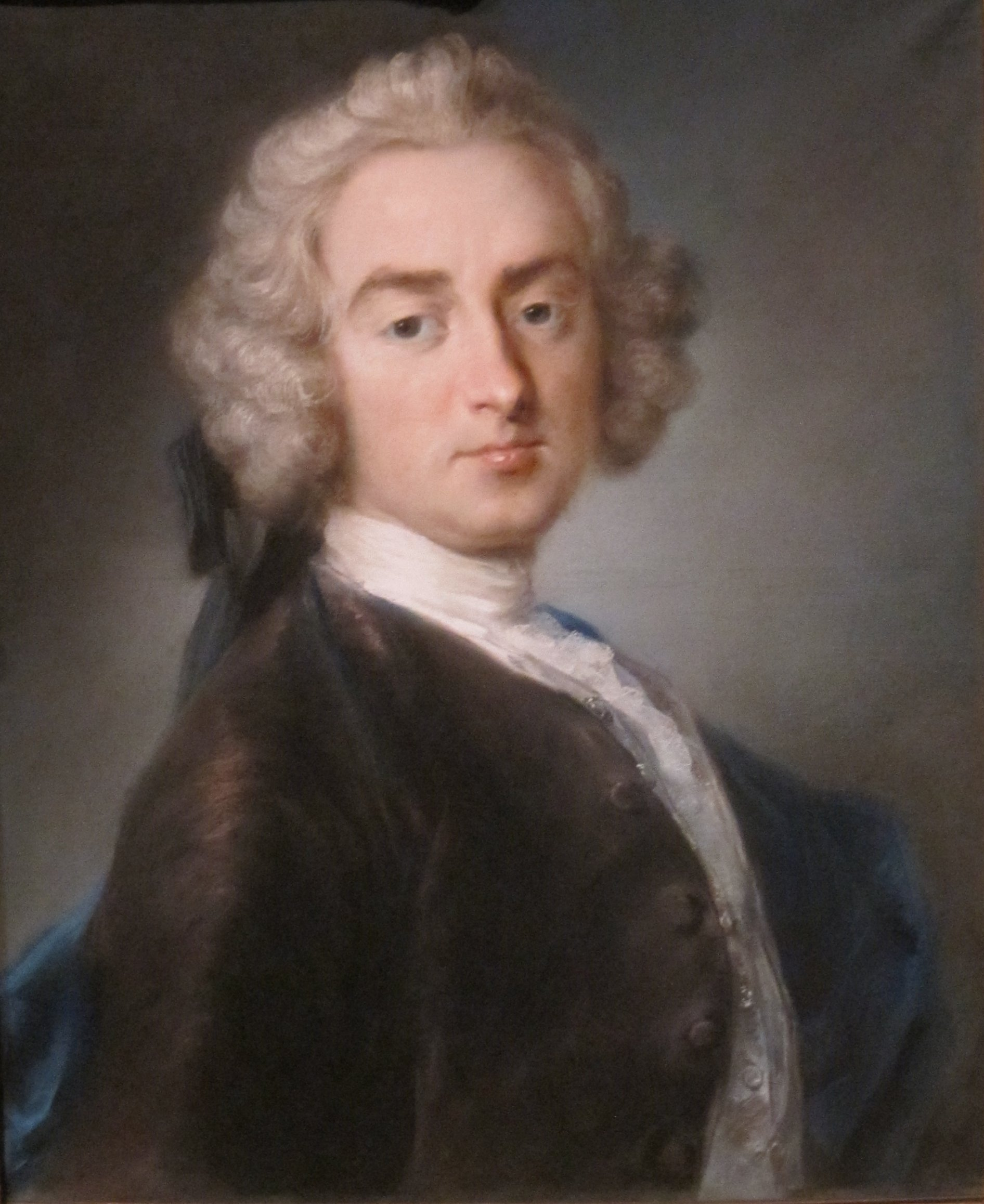
- Sir James Gray, Second Baronet by Rosalba Carriera, Getty Center
- Born: c. 1708
- Died: 14 February 1773
- Education: Clare College, Cambridge
- Occupations: diplomat; antiquary

Sir James Gray, 2nd Baronet KB, PC (c. 1708 – 14 February 1773) was a British diplomat and antiquary.

== Life ==
He was the elder son of Sir James Gray, 1st Baronet and his wife Hester Dodd. His younger brother was General George Gray. He completed his education at Clare College, Cambridge, being awarded M.A. in 1729. He then travelled on the continent.

He began a diplomatic career in 1744 as secretary to Robert Darcy, 4th Earl of Holderness, the Minister Resident at Venice and succeeded him as Resident there from 1746 to 1752. In October 1753, he was sent to Naples, where he remained until 1763, undertaking a mission to Rome concerning The Young Pretender in 1755. His final diplomatic position was as ambassador to Spain from 1766 to 1770, during which time he was there only about two years. On his return to England in 1769, he was sworn to the Privy Council. He was made a Knight Companion of the Order of the Bath in 1759.

He and his brother were founder members of the Society of Dilettanti of which George was secretary and treasurer. While in Naples, he took a close interest in the archaeological discoveries at Portici and Herculaneum. He nominated suitable young grand tourists for the Society of Dilettanti. He also offered advice on the king's new palace at Caserta.

He died in 1773 leaving two illegitimate 'natural' children: A son James born 1759 and a daughter Catherine born 1761 in Naples. Their mother was a noblewoman named Donna Caterina Rosiglio, to whom he was not married at the time of their births. His baronetcy was inherited by his brother, who died the same year, upon which it became extinct.

== Sources ==
- L. H. Cust, ‘Gray, Sir James, second baronet (c.1708–1773)’, rev. S. J. Skedd, Oxford Dictionary of National Biography, (Oxford University Press, 2004; online edn, Jan 2008), Retrieved 26 Aug 2008

Diplomatic posts
Preceded by The Earl of Holderness	Minister at Venice; 1746–1752	Succeeded by ?
Preceded by ?	British Ambassador to the Kingdom of Naples; 1753–1763	Succeeded by Sir William Hamilton
Preceded by The Earl of Rochford	British ambassador to Spain; 1766–1770	Succeeded by George Pitt
Baronetage of Nova Scotia
Preceded by James Gray	Baronet (of Denne Hill); 1722–1773	Succeeded by George Gray
