= Sir George Gray, 3rd Baronet =

Lieutenant-General Sir George Gray, 3rd Baronet (c. 1710 – 14 February 1773) was an officer of the British Army.

== Biography ==
He was a younger son of Sir James Gray, 1st Baronet, by his wife Hester Dodd. He served for many years in the Household Cavalry, and was promoted to lieutenant-colonel of the 1st Troop of Horse Guards in July 1749. On 19 July 1759, he was appointed colonel of the 61st Regiment of Foot, and in 1761 he was promoted major-general. He transferred to the colonelcy of the 37th Regiment of Foot in 1768, and in 1770 he was promoted to lieutenant-general. He was also an amateur architect.

On 9 January 1773, he succeeded his brother James in the baronetcy, but he died the following month on 14 February, and was buried at Kensington on 17 February 1773. He had no children by his wife Charlotte, and the baronetcy became extinct. His widow died in 1788.

Military offices
Preceded by Hon James Stuart	Colonel of the 37th Regiment of Foot; 1768–1773	Succeeded by Sir Eyre Coote
Preceded by Granville Elliott	Colonel of the 61st Regiment of Foot; 1759–1768	Succeeded by John Gore
Baronetage of Nova Scotia
Preceded by James Gray	Baronet (of Denne Hill); 1773	Extinct
