= List of diplomats of the United Kingdom to the Two Sicilies =

This is a List of diplomats from the United Kingdom to the Two Sicilies, usually based at Naples

== List of heads of mission ==
Until 1753, Great Britain appears only to have had consuls at Naples and Messina, and no permanent diplomatic mission.

=== Envoys Extraordinary to the Kingdom of Naples and/or the Kingdom of Sicily ===
- 1753–1764: Sir James Gray, Bt
- 1764–1800: Sir William Hamilton
- 1800–1801: Sir Arthur Paget, also minister plenipotentiary
- 1801–1803: William Drummond

=== Envoys Extraordinary and Ministers Plenipotentiary to the Kingdom of Naples and/or the Kingdom of Sicily ===
- 1803–1806: Hugh Elliot
- 1806: General Henry Edward Fox
- 1806–1809: William Drummond
- 1809–1811: William Pitt Amherst, Lord Amherst
- 1811–1814: William Cavendish Bentinck (Simultaneously held supreme military command in the Mediterranean)
  - 1812–1814: Frederick James Lamb Accredited but never in fact in charge
- 1814–1816: Sir William à Court

=== Envoys Extraordinary and Ministers Plenipotentiary to the Kingdom of the Two Sicilies ===
- 1816–1822: Sir William à Court
- 1822–1825: William Richard Hamilton
- 1824–1832: William Noel Hill
  - 1825: John, Lord Burgersh special mission
- 1832–1833: Lord Ponsonby
- 1832–1856: Hon. William Temple (ambassador)
  - 1842–1845: Sir Woodbine Parish Plenipotentiary (jointly with Temple)
  - 1847: Gilbert, Earl of Minto, special mission
  - 1847–1848: Francis Napier, 10th Lord Napier Chargé d'Affaires
