= John Murray (British diplomat) =

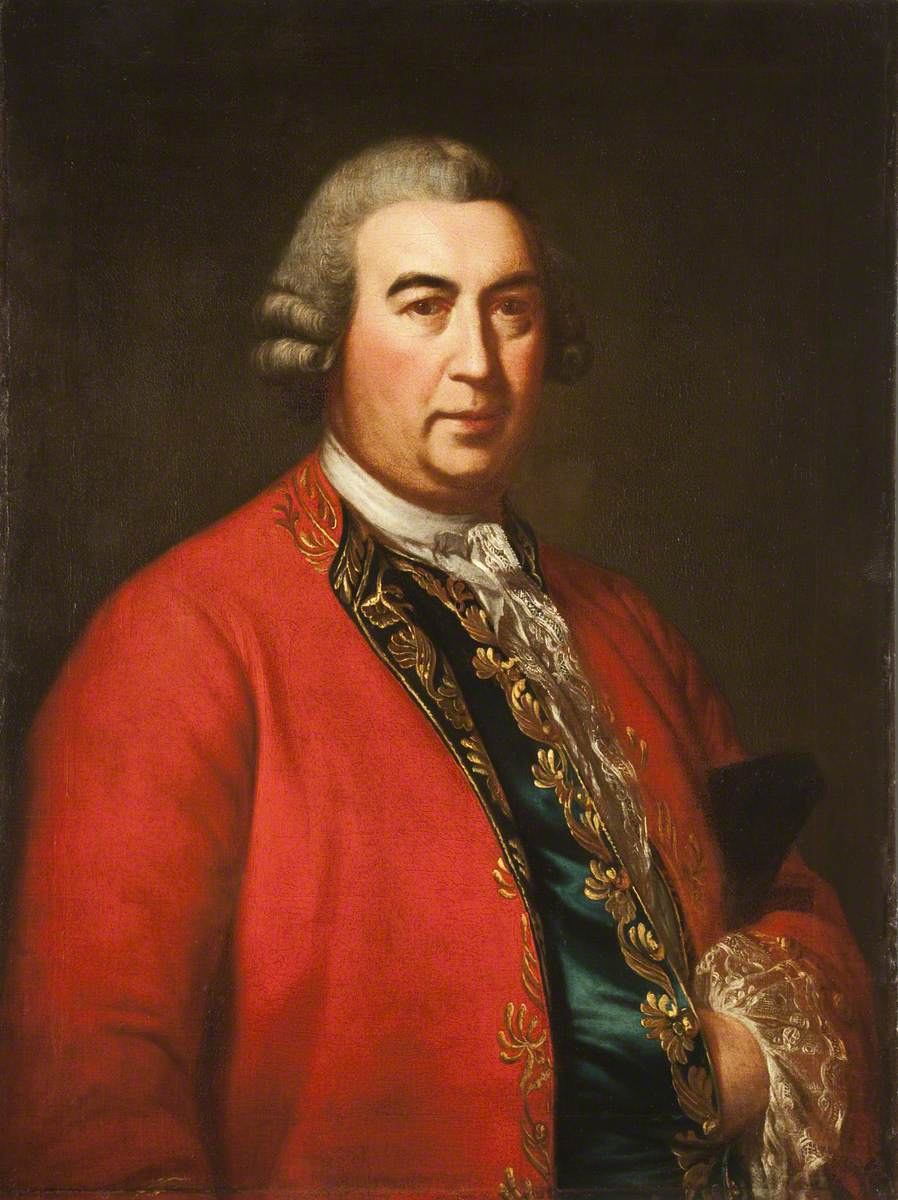
A portrait of John Murray in diplomatic uniform by an unknown artist

John Murray (c.1714 – 9 August 1775) was a British diplomat, notorious rake and friend of Giacomo Casanova.

== Biography ==
Murray was born in Douglas, Isle of Man in around 1714. In 1748, he married Bridget Milbanke, the widow of Sir Butler Cavendish Wentworth.

On 9 August 1754 he took up position as the British resident minister in the Republic of Venice. He gained a reputation for profligacy and rakish behaviour; Lady Mary Wortley Montagu stated that Murray was "not to be trusted" and was "despised by this Government [Venetian] for his smuggling... and always surrounded with pimps and brokers". While in Venice he accumulated a sizable collection of pictures, including paintings by Titian and other masters of the Venetian school. He was a friend of Casanova who remarked that Murray, "by jumping from one to another, he always had the prettiest girls in Venice".

He was appointed on 15 November 1765 as British Ambassador to the Ottoman Empire, leaving Venice on 11 May 1766 and arriving at Constantinople on 2 June 1766. Ten years later he was given leave to return home, leaving Turkey on 27 January 1775. He sailed home on 25 May 1775 but died during a stop-over in Venice on 9 August 1775. He was buried in the Protestant cemetery on the Venice Lido.

Diplomatic posts
| Preceded by Robert Colebrooke | British Ambassador to the Ottoman Empire; 1765–1775 | Succeeded by Sir Robert Ainslie, Bt |
| Preceded by ? | British Resident to the Republic of Venice; 1754–1765 | Succeeded by James Wright |
