= Sir James Wright, 1st Baronet =

English diplomat and art collector (1730–1804)

Sir James Wright, 1st Baronet (1717 – 8 March 1804) was an English diplomat and art collector who served as the Minister Resident of Great Britain to Venice from 1766 to 1774.

== Background ==
Wright was the son of Thomas Wright and Mary Huband. He is usually referred to as gentleman, but may have been an attorney at law by training or profession.

Wright was baptised on 18 January 1717. He went to school in Warwick, then attended Trinity College, Cambridge. He married Catherine Stapleton, daughter of William Stapleton.

== First period in Italy, courtier ==
Wright and his wife Catherine first visited Venice in December 1758. An encounter there with Lady Mary Wortley Montagu led to an introduction to John Stuart, 3rd Earl of Bute, and his wife Mary, daughter of Lady Mary.

The couple apparently had a close marriage. It was observed by Lady Mary, during the time in Venice the two of them comforted each other over the loss of their stillborn child. It put her in mind of the Butes, friends whose company she enjoyed: and Catherine Wright became her correspondent.

Wright was from that time on good terms with Lord Bute, who became Prime Minister in 1762, the relationship being described by William Bodham Donne as "private friend". Wright was a Groom of the Bedchamber to George III from 21 December 1762 to 30 May 1801. He was knighted on 3 July 1766.

== Second period in Italy ==
Wright was appointed minister to Venice the same day he was knighted, and reached Venice in mid-September 1766.

Wright was afflicted by illness while in Venice: and spent a period in England, of around two years, from August 1769 to August 1771, during which Robert Richie deputised for Sir James.

Wright was created a baronet on 12 October 1772 for his services as His Majesty's Resident at Venice. The Wrights left Venice in 1773, and in September 1774 he was relieved as minister.

== Later life in politics ==
In 1778, Wright became involved in a political furore when he and Dr. Addington, his own and Chatham's physician, engaged in a futile attempt to bring about a political alliance between Bute and Chatham. This incident terminated the friendship with Bute.

== Residence, collection and estates ==
In about 1770 Wright bought Ray House in Woodford from Bennet Hannot. He later took up residence in the two-storey five-bay brick mansion. Around 1773–1776 Robert Adam worked on Ray House for Wright. Here Wright housed a collection of paintings acquired in his time in Venice. He was an art dealer, and made exaggerated claims for the works: a painting now attributed to Palma Vecchio was described by him as a Giorgione.

Wright founded an artificial slate business on his estate in Woodford.

== Family ==
Wright and his wife had one son, George.

=== Third period in Italy ===
The Wrights spent further time in Italy during the 1790s. Their son George, an invalid, was there with his tutor.

=== Ray Lodge ===
Wright built Ray Lodge, near Ray House, for George, employing from 1793 as architect John Buonarotti Papworth.

=== Aftermath ===
Lady Wright died at Bath on 6 January 1802. The Wrights had then been living in Bath for some time. Wright died at Bathford on 8 March 1804.

Baronetage of Great Britain
| New creation | Baronet (of Venice); 1772–1804 | Succeeded by George Wright |
