= Perceval (surname) =

Perceval is a surname, and may refer to:

- Alexander Perceval (1788–1858), British politician
- Alexander Perceval (merchant) (1821–1866), British merchant in Hong Kong, son of Alexander Perceval (1788–1858)
- Anne Mary Perceval (1790–1876), English botanist and author in Lower Canada
- Armand-Pierre Caussin de Perceval (1795–1871), French orientalist
- Arthur Philip Perceval (1799–1853) was an English cleric, royal chaplain and theological writer
- Benet Perceval (1916–2009), English Benedictine monk
- Charles Perceval, 2nd Baron Arden (1756–1840), British politician
- Charles Perceval, 7th Earl of Egmont (1845–1897), British politician
- Don Louis Perceval (1908–1979), British artist and illustrator
- Edward Perceval (1861–1955), British Army officer
- Frederick Perceval, 11th Earl of Egmont (1914–2001), Canadian farmer
- George Perceval, 6th Earl of Egmont (1794–1874), British naval commander
- Henry Perceval, 5th Earl of Egmont (1796–1841), British politician
- Hugh Perceval (1908–1987), British screenwriter and film producer
- Jane Perceval (1769–1844), wife of Spencer Perceval, British Prime Minister
- Jean-Jacques-Antoine Caussin de Perceval (1759–1835), French orientalist
- John Perceval (1923–2000), Australian artist
- Sir John Perceval, 1st Baronet (1629–1665), land owner in Ireland; knighted by Henry Cromwell and later made a baronet by Charles II
- John Perceval, 1st Earl of Egmont (1683–1748), grandson of the 1st Baronet; Anglo-Irish politician
- John Perceval, 2nd Earl of Egmont (1711–1770), British politician, and First Lord of the Admiralty
- John Perceval, 3rd Earl of Egmont (1738–1822), British politician
- John Perceval, 4th Earl of Egmont (1767–1835), British peer and politician
- John Thomas Perceval (1803–1876), British army officer and lunacy law reform campaigner
- María Perceval (born 1956), Argentine politician
- Philip Perceval (1605–1647), English politician
- Robert Perceval (1756–1839), Irish physician
- Robert Perceval (priest), 16th-century Church of England priest
- Robert Perceval-Maxwell (politician, born 1870) (1870–1932), British soldier and politician
- Robert Perceval-Maxwell (politician, born 1896) (1896–1963), British politician
- Roger Perceval (died after 1087), Anglo-Norman landowner and Chief Butler of England
- Spencer Perceval (1762–1812), British Prime Minister
- Spencer Perceval (junior) (1795–1859), British Member of Parliament, son of the Prime Minister
- Spencer George Perceval (1838–1922), English antiquarian and geologist
- Westby Perceval (1854–1928), New Zealand politician
- William Perceval (fl. 1703–1735), Church of Ireland priest

== See also ==
- Percival (surname)
