= John Perceval (disambiguation) =

John Perceval (1923–2000) was an Australian artist.

John Perceval may also refer to:

- Sir John Perceval, 1st Baronet (1629–1665), land owner in Ireland; knighted by Henry Cromwell and later made a baronet by Charles II
- John Perceval, 1st Earl of Egmont (1683–1748), grandson of the 1st Baronet; Anglo-Irish politician
- John Perceval, 2nd Earl of Egmont (1711–1770), British politician, and First Lord of the Admiralty
- John Perceval, 3rd Earl of Egmont (1738–1822), British politician
- John Perceval, 4th Earl of Egmont (1767–1835), British peer and politician
- John Thomas Perceval (1803–1876), British army officer and lunacy law reform campaigner

== See also ==
- John Percival (disambiguation)
