= Percival (disambiguation) =

Perceval or Percival is a Knight of the Round Table in the legend of King Arthur.

Percival, Perceval, or similar names may also refer to:

== Arthurian legend ==
- Perceval, the Story of the Grail (French: Le Conte du Graal), a 12th-century romance by Chrétien de Troyes along its various several continuations and prologues
- Perceval le Gallois, a 1978 French film adaptation of Chrétien's work
- Parzival, a 13th-century romance by Wolfram von Eschenbach
- Sir Perceval of Galles, a 14th-century English pastiche romance
- Parsifal, an 1882 opera by Richard Wagner.

== People ==
=== People with the given name Percival or Perceval ===
- Percival (given name)

=== People with the surname Perceval ===
- Perceval (surname)

=== People with the surname Percival ===
- Percival (surname)

=== Fictional characters ===
- Mr Percival, the pelican in the 1976 Australian movie, Storm Boy
- Mr Percival, a human character in Thomas & Friends
- Percival "Perry" Ulysses Cox, character in the 2001–2010 American television show Scrubs
- Percival C. McLeach, the main villain in the 1990 Disney film The Rescuers Down Under
- Percival Graves, in the film Fantastic Beasts and Where to Find Them
- Percival "Percy" Fredrickstein Von Musel Klossowski de Rolo III, a character portrayed by Taliesin Jaffe in the series Critical Role

== Other uses ==
- Percival, Iowa, unincorporated town in the United States
- Percival, Saskatchewan, former hamlet in Canada
- Percival (band), Polish folk band
- Perceval (sculpture), a public sculpture by British artist Sarah Lucas
- Percival Street, in the East Point and Wan Chai, Hong Kong
- Percival Aircraft, a British aircraft manufacturer in the 1950s, now known as Hunting Aircraft
- USS Percival, a list of ships by this name

== See also ==
- Percevault, a surname
- Parsifal (disambiguation)
