= John Percival (disambiguation) =

John Percival (1779–1862) was a United States Navy officer.

John Percival may also refer to:

- John Percival (Mayor of London), lord mayor of London in 1498
- John Percival (bishop) (1834–1918), English educator and bishop
- John Percival (botanist) (1863–1949), English agricultural botanist who described Khorasan wheat
- John Percival (politician) (1870–1942), Australian politician
- John Percival (rugby league) (20th century), New Zealand rugby league referee
- John Percival (TV producer) (1937–2005), British television producer and documentary maker
- John Percival (cricketer) (1902–1983), English cricketer

== See also ==
- Jack Percival (footballer, born 1913) (1913–1979), English footballer (Manchester City)
- Jack Percival (footballer, born 1924), English footballer (Huddersfield Town)
- John Perceval (disambiguation)
