= Percival (surname) =

Percival is a surname, and may refer to:

- Allan Percival (1923– c.1985), Canadian cricketer
- Andre Percival (born 1975), Guyanese cricketer
- Arthur Percival (1887–1966), British Lieutenant General
- Arthur Blayney Percival (1874-1940), British game ranger in East Africa
- Bernard Percival, Antiguan politician
- Blake Percival, American USIS whistleblower
- Brian Percival (born 1962), British film director
- Clinton Percival, Saint Kitts and Nevis football manager
- Colin Percival (born c.1980), Canadian computer scientist and computer security researcher
- Craig Percival, English track cyclist
- Cyril Percival (1889–1948), British film actor of the silent era
- Darren Percival, Australian singer
- Daniel Percival (1979–2024), English actor and businessman
- Daniel Percival (director), British director and screenwriter of television drama
- David Eyre Percival (1914–1995), British architect and town planner
- Edgar Percival (1897–1984), Australian aircraft designer and pilot
- Edmund Percival (1907–1951), British chemist
- Elizabeth Percival (1906–1997), British chemist and expert on algal polysaccharides
- George Hector Percival (1902–1983), British dermatologist
- Greg Percival (1925–2011), Australian politician
- Harold W. Percival (1868–1953), British-American writer and theosophist
- Henry R. Percival (1854–1903), American Episcopal priest and author
- Ian Percival (1921–1998), British politician
- Ian C. Percival (born 1931), British theoretical physicist
- Jack Percival (footballer, born 1913) (1913–1979), English footballer (Manchester City)
- Jack Percival (footballer, born 1924) (1924–2011), English footballer (Huddersfield Town)
- James Percival (rugby union) (born 1983), English rugby union footballer
- James Gates Percival (1796–1856), American poet and geologist
- Jason Percival (born 1973), English footballer
- Sir John Percival, tailor who became Lord Mayor of London in 1498
- John Percival (1779–1862), United States Navy officer
- John Percival (bishop) (1834–1918), English educator and bishop
- John Percival (botanist) (1863–1949), English agricultural botanist who described Khorasan wheat
- John Percival (politician) (1870–1942), Australian politician
- John Percival (rugby league) (20th century), New Zealand rugby league referee
- John Percival (TV producer) (1937–2005), British television producer and documentary maker
- John Percival (cricketer) (1902–1983), English cricketer
- Kylie Percival, Australian archivist
- Lacey Percival (1885–1968), Australian cinematographer
- Lance Percival (1933–2015), British actor and comedian
- Lance Percival (athlete) (1906–1964), British hurdler
- Launcelot Percival (1869–1941), British cleric and rugby union footballer
- Lloyd Percival (1913–1974), Canadian sports coach and author
- Mark Percival (born 1994), English rugby league footballer
- Mac Percival (born 1940), American football player
- Matt Percival, British cartoonist
- Millicent Percival (died 2015), Antiguan and Barbudan politician
- Nathaniel Knight-Percival (born 1987), English football player
- Nick Percival, British graphic artist and graphic novelist
- Olive Percival (1869–1945), American gardening writer
- Peniamina Percival (born 1994), Samoan judoka
- Peter Percival (1803–1882), British-born missionary and educator
- Philip Percival (1886–1966), British hunter and safari guide in Kenya
- Ria Percival (born 1989), New Zealand footballer
- Richard Percivale (1550–1620), English Hispanist, grammarian and lexicographer
- Teuila Percival, New Zealand paediatrician and health researcher
- Thomas Percival (1740–1804), English physician
- Thomas Percival (actor) (fl.1671–1686), English actor
- Thomas Ivan Percival (2009-2026), son of Mark Percival
- Tom Percival (1943– 1984), British powerboat racer
- Troy Percival (born 1969), American baseball player
- Walter Percival (1887–1934), American actor, producer and writer

== See also ==
- Perceval (surname)
