= Sydenham House, Somerset =

House in Somerset, England

Coordinates: 51.1406°N 2.9859°W

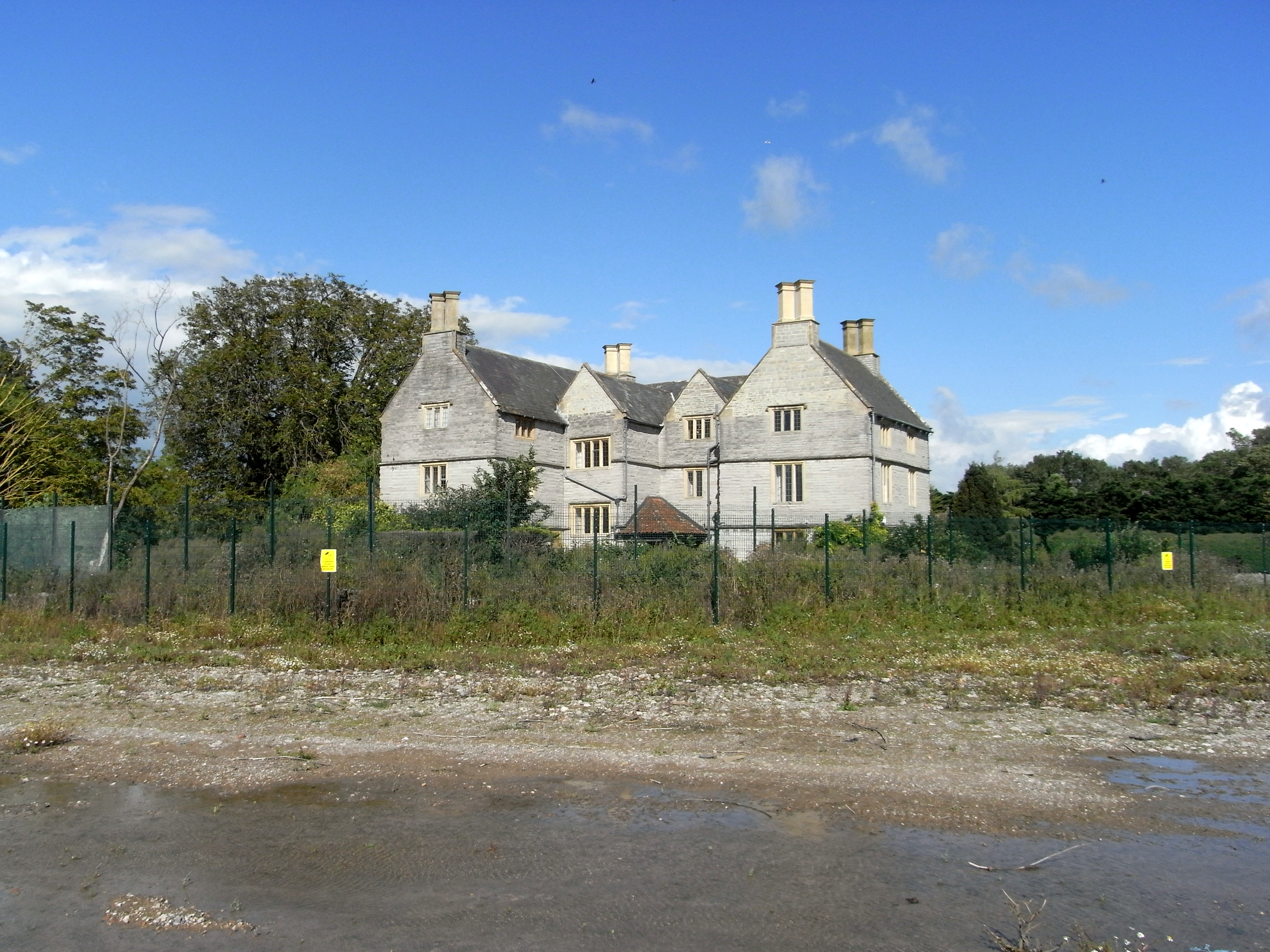
Sydenham House, west front, in 2015

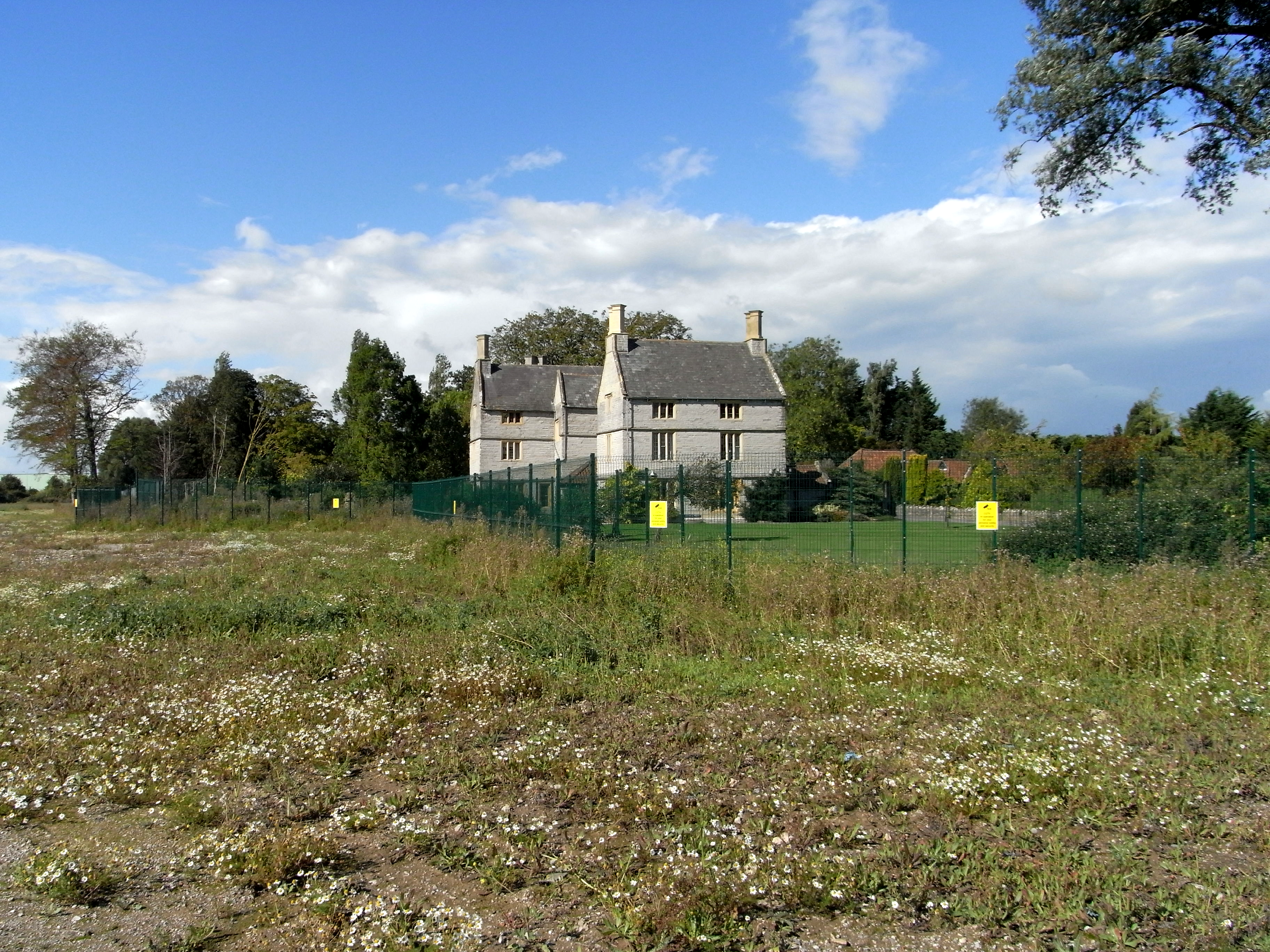
Sydenham House, south side, in 2015

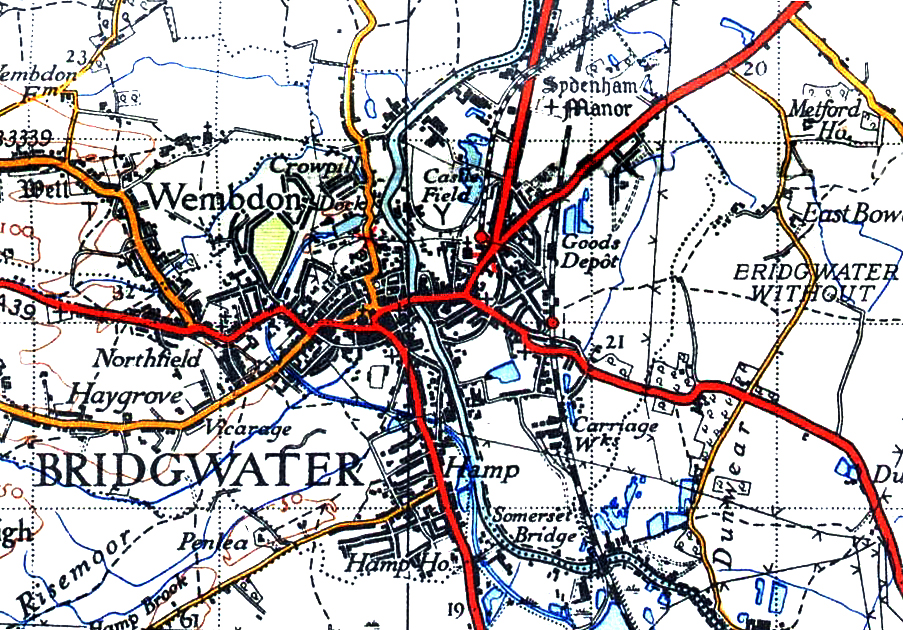
"Sydenham Manor" shown to the north-east of the historic centre of Bridgwater in a 1946 map

Sydenham House, the manor house of the ancient manor of Sydenham in the parish of Wembdon, Somerset, England, is a grade II listed building, constructed in the early 16th century and refronted and rebuilt after 1613. In 1937, British Cellophane Ltd set up production and built extensive factories on 59 acres (24 ha) of land ("Sydenham Manor Fields") adjacent to the manor house. Production ceased in 2005 and between 2010 and 2015 the industrial site was razed to the ground. In 2015 the razed site is owned by EDF Energy, which in 2012 purchased the manor house with the former factory site, intended for construction of temporary accommodation for 1,000 workers.

== History ==
In 1381 Sydenham House was sacked by Bridgwater's peasants under Nicholas Frampton during the Peasants' Revolt of 1381. The local tax collectors were murdered and the town's records were destroyed. Its owners were on the losing side in the Civil War and again in the Monmouth Rebellion.

The current building was constructed in the early 16th century and refronted and rebuilt after 1613. In 1937, British Cellophane Ltd set up production and built extensive factories on 59 acres (24 ha) of land ("Sydenham Manor Fields") adjacent to the manor house.

== Location ==
The house is situated to the north side of the A39 Bath Road, about one mile (1.6 km) north-east of the centre of historic Bridgwater,

== Owners ==
It was the earliest known seat of the de Sydenham (later Sydenham) family, which took its surname from the manor.

The family split into many prominent branches, the senior branch seated at Sydenham and Kittisford died out in the male line in the 15th century when Sydenham passed via the heiress to the Cave family, then to the Percival family, later Earl of Egmont. The next senior line was seated in the early 15th century at Combe Sydenham in Somerset, of which family was Simon Sydenham (died 1438), Bishop of Chichester, and later inherited the Somerset manors of Orchard Sydenham (later called Orchard Wyndham) and Brympton d'Evercy, which latter remained the seat of the Sydenham baronets, which title was created in 1641. Another branch was seated at Combe, Dulverton and were lords of the manor of Dulverton.

Percival lords of the manor of Sydenham included Richard Percivale (1550–1620) an administrator and politician, also known as a Hispanist and lexicographer. He wrote a Spanish grammar for English readers. He was the eldest son and heir of George Perceval (1561–1601) of Sydenham, by his wife Elizabeth Bampfylde, a daughter of Sir Edward Bampfylde (d.1528) of Poltimore, Devon and Elizabeth Wadham, daughter of Sir Nicholas Wadham (died 1542) of Edge, Branscombe and Merryfield, Ilton. He was the ancestor of the Earls of Egmont.

In 1935 British Cellophane Ltd. purchased the house and surrounding land from Philip Sturdy, who had acquired it in 1921 and had added additional land purchased in 1927. Sydenham House was restored in the 1960s and again in the 1980s, and in 1987 served as a conference and hospitality centre for British Cellophane Ltd.
