= Anne Poulett =

Anne Poulet

Member of Parliament for Bridgwater (UK Parliament constituency)
- In office 1768–1785
- Preceded by: Viscount Perceval
- Succeeded by: Robert Thornton (MP)

Personal details
- Born: 11 July 1711
- Died: 5 July 1785 (aged 73)
- Party: Tory

The Honourable Anne Poulett (11 July 1711 – 5 July 1785) was a British politician who sat in the House of Commons for sixteen years from 1769 until his death in 1785.

Poulett, the fourth son of John Poulett, 1st Earl Poulett, was born on 11 July 1711. He received his unusual first name in honour of Queen Anne, who was his sponsor at his baptism.

Poulett initially stood for election at Bridgwater in the 1768 general election. At first, he was declared defeated, but the result was reversed on petition in 1769. He was returned unopposed in the 1774 general election and headed the poll at contested elections in 1780 and 1784. Throughout his career he was generally a supporter of Lord North, though occasionally voting against him.

In 1780, Poulett presented to St Mary's Church in Bridgwater a magnificent 17th-century painting of The Descent from the Cross, apparently captured when a Spanish warship was taken as a prize. The artist is unknown, although it has been controversially attributed to Murillo. The picture is now used as the altarpiece of the church.

On 2 May 1785, he presented to parliament a petition from his constituents for the abolition of the slave trade, making Bridgwater the first town to submit such a petition. However, it was largely ignored.

Poulett died on 5 July 1785.

Parliament of Great Britain
Preceded by Benjamin Allen; Viscount Perceval	Member of Parliament for Bridgwater; 1769–1785; With: Benjamin Allen 1769–81; John Acland 1781–84; Rear-Admiral Alexander Hood 1784–85	Succeeded by Robert Thornton; Rear-Admiral Alexander Hood
