= Manor of Kittisford =

Historic manor near Wellington in Somerset, England

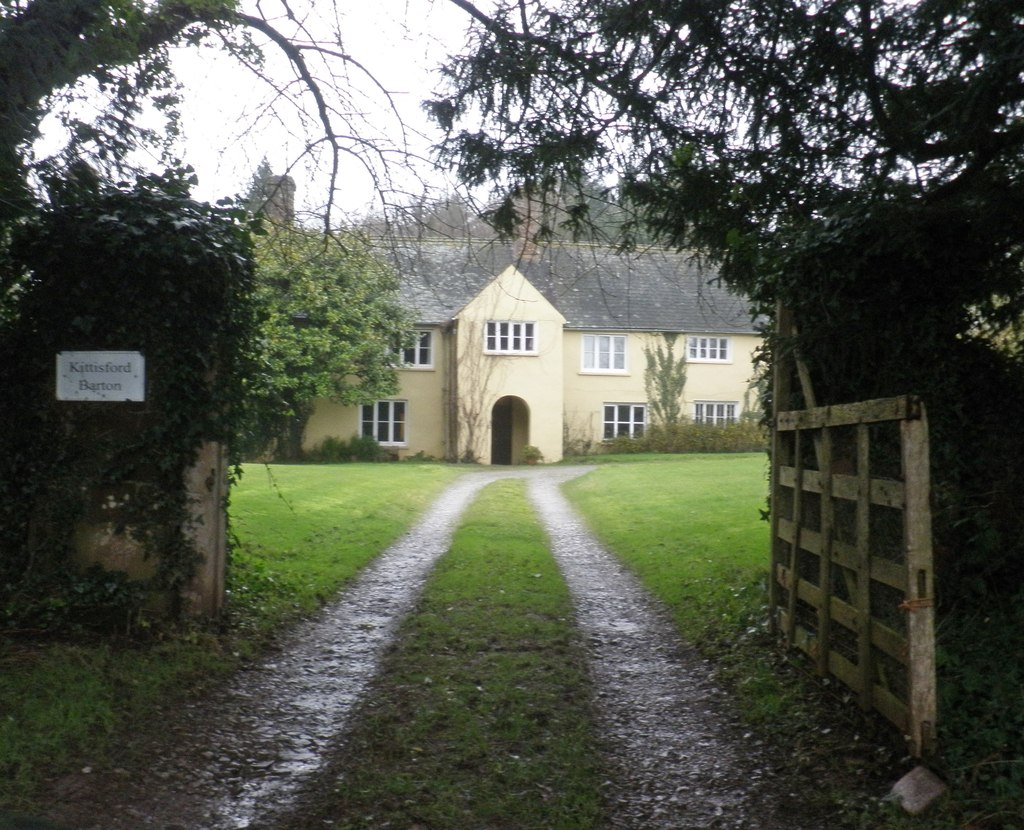
Kittisford Barton in 2014

Kittisford is a historic manor near Wellington in Somerset, England. It is situated on the River Tone, south of the village of Bathealton. The surviving manor house is called Kittisford Barton, situated formerly within the historic parish of Kittisford, now amalgamated into the parish of Stawley. It was built in the late 15th or early 16th century. It is a Grade II* listed building.

== Descent ==
=== Arundel ===
The Domesday Book of 1086 lists the manor of Chedesford as held in-chief from King William the Conqueror by Roger Arundel, whose tenant there was a certain William. Immediately before the Norman Conquest of 1066 it had been held by the Saxon Osmund Stramun. The Domesday entry may be translated from Latin as follows:

"Wilham holds of Roger, Chedesford. Osmund Stramun held it in the time of King Edward, and gelded for two hides. The arable is seven carucates. In demesne are two carucates, and three servants, and five villanes, and six cottagers, with three ploughs and a half. There is a mill of seven shillings rent, and three acres of meadow, and ten acres of pasture, and twelve acres of wood. It was worth forty shillings, now sixty shillings".

=== de Kittisford ===
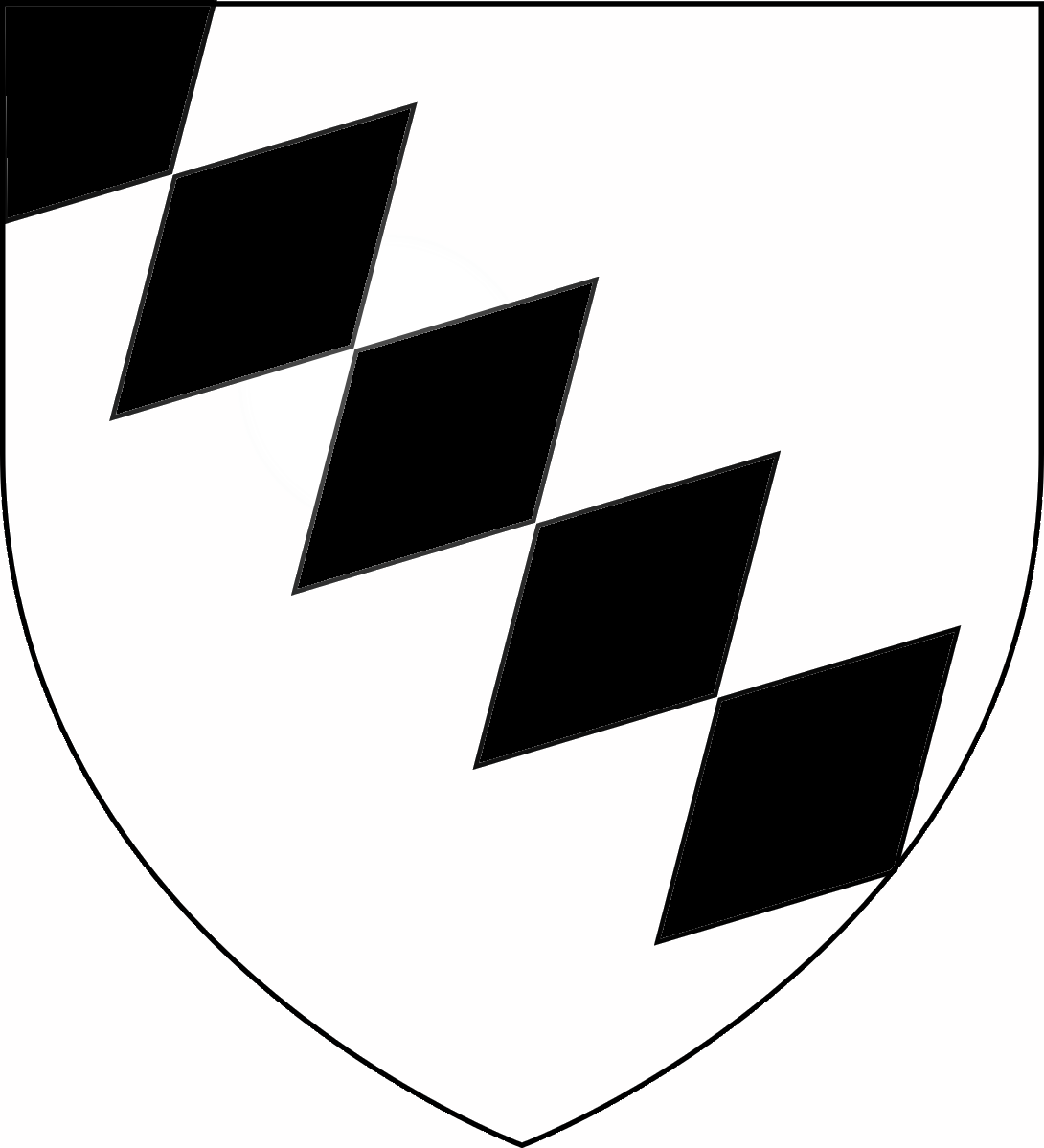
Arms of de Kittisford (13th century) of Kittisford: Argent, a bend of fusils sable. These arms are visible sculpted (without tinctures) quartered by Sydenham on the monument of Richard Bampfield (d.1594) of Poltimore, Devon, in Poltimore Church

The descendants of the Domesday Book tenant "William" later assumed the surname de Kittisford, and held this manor till the time of Henry III, when the family died out in the male line. The daughter and heiress of John de Kittisford, the last in the male line, married John de Sydenham, lord of the manor of Sydenham near Bridgwater, Somerset, to whom therefore passed the manor of Kittisford.

=== Sydenham ===
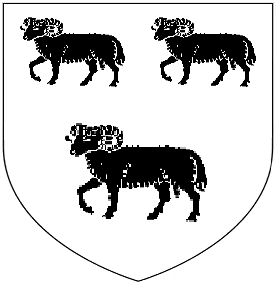
Arms of Sydenham: Argent, three rams passant guardant sable

The Sydenham family of Sydenham, about 1/4 mile east of the centre of modern Bridgwater, now the site of Bridgwater College, held Kittisford for several generations. The family split into many prominent branches, the senior branch died out in the male line in the 15th century when Sydenham passed via the heiress to the Cave family, then to the Percival family, later Earl of Egmont. The next senior line was seated in the early 15th century at Combe Sydenham in Somerset, of which family was Simon Sydenham (died 1438), Bishop of Chichester, and later inherited the Somerset manors of Orchard Sydenham (later called Orchard Wyndham) and Brympton d'Evercy, which latter remained the seat of the Sydenham baronets, which title was created in 1641.

=== Blewett ===
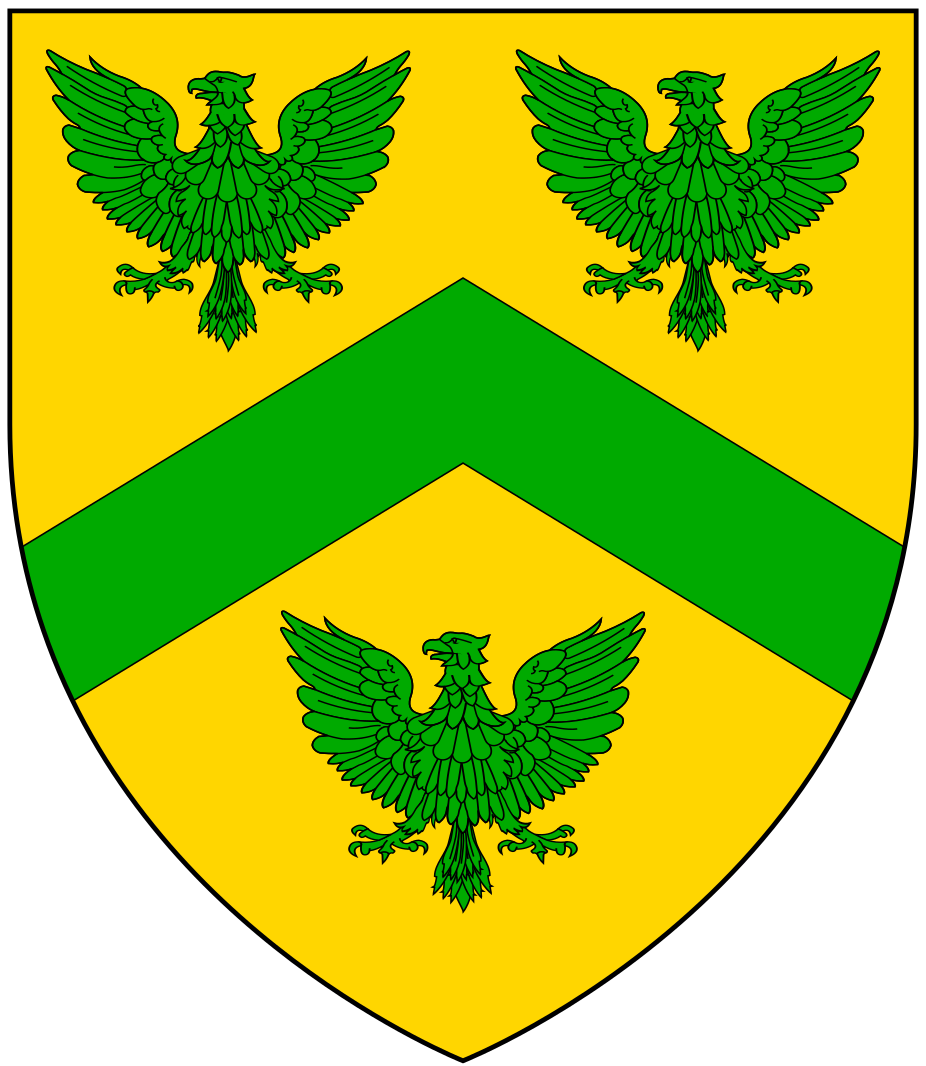
Arms of Bluett: Or, a chevron between three eagles displayed vert

In 1481 Kittisford passed to the Blewett family on the marriage of Agnes Sydenham, daughter and heiress of John Sydenham, to Nicholas Blewet of Lottisham. The Blewett family had long been seated at nearby Greenham and at nearby Holcombe Rogus in Devon. Walter Blewet, a descendant of Nicholas, as is recorded in his inquisition post mortem, held at his death the manor of Kittisford, and the advowson of the Church of St. Nicholas thereto belonging and a messuage and one hundred acres of land called South Cothay in the parish of Kittisford, held from the overlord "Eleanor, Countess of Northumberland" (apparently Eleanor Poynings, widow of Henry Percy, 3rd Earl of Northumberland (1421-1461)), by grand serjeanty of one pair of spurs to be paid yearly. His son and heir was Nicholas Blewett (born 1451). In St. Nicholas' Church, Kittisford, survives a monumental brass to Richard Bluett (d.1524) and his wife Agnes Verney. Richard Bluett (d.1524) was the younger son of Walter Bluett of Holcombe Rogus by his wife Jane St Maur, daughter of John St Maur by his wife Elizabeth Brooke, daughter of Thomas Brooke (c.1391-1439), MP for Dorset and Somerset.

=== Langdon ===
In 1791 the owner of the manor of Kittisford was Thomas Langdon.

== Sources ==
- Collinson, John, History and Antiquities of the County of Somerset, Vol.3, Bath, 1791, p. 24, Kittisford
