= Church of St Nicholas, Kittisford =

Church in Somerset, England

Church of St Nicholas
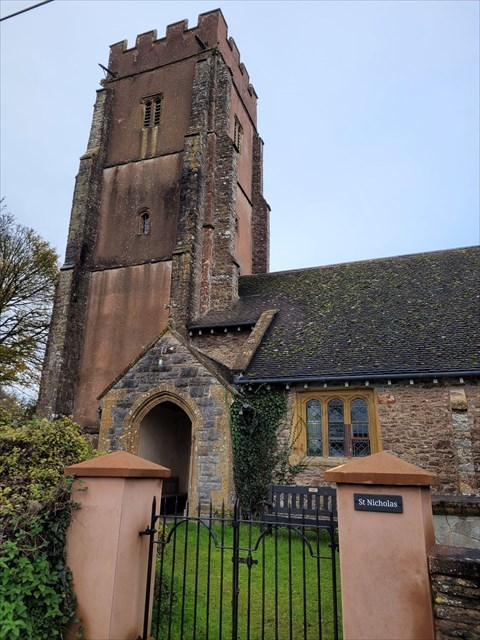
- Kittisford Church

- Location within Somerset
- 50.9929°N 3.3148°W
- Location: Kittisford, Somerset, England

History
- Built: around 1500

Listed Building – Grade II*
- Official name: Church of St Nicholas
- Designated: 25 January 1956
- Reference no.: 1176263

The Anglican Church of St Nicholas in Kittisford, Somerset, England was built around 1500. It is a Grade II* listed building.

== History ==
The church was built between 1480 and 1500 after Cothay Manor was constructed. Some of the fabric of an earlier church on the site may still survive. It is believed that the Bluett family were responsible for its construction.

It was expanded in the mid 17th century including the construction of the north chapel. It had a Victorian restoration in 1875.

The parish is part of the West Tone benefice within the Diocese of Bath and Wells.

== Architecture ==
The church is built of red sandstone with tiled roofs. It consists of a three-bay nave, south aisle and south porch. A particular point of interest are the timber pillars on the south side of the nave. The three-stage west tower has a parapet and is supported by buttresses. The tower has four bells.

Inside the church is a wooden pulpit built in 1616.

== See also ==
- List of ecclesiastical parishes in the Diocese of Bath and Wells
