= Living in the Past (TV series) =

- Genre: Documentary; Reality television
- Created by: John Percival
- Theme music composer: Alan Stivell
- Opening theme: "Manx Melody"
- Country of origin: United Kingdom
- Original language: English
- No. of episodes: 12

Production
- Running time: 50 minutes & 30 minutes

Original release
- Network: BBC2
- Release: 23 February – 11 May 1978

Living in the Past is a 1978 BBC fly on the wall documentary programme. It followed a group of fifteen volunteers, six couples and three children, recreating a British Iron Age settlement, where they sustained themselves for a year, equipped only with the tools, crops and livestock that would have been available at that time.

The series is considered a precursor to modern reality television.

== Broadcast history ==
Living in the Past consisted of twelve episodes (two 50 minute episodes and ten of 30 minute episodes), airing from 23 February to 11 May 1978. The series was re-aired in 1981 in edited form, being reduced to 8 programmes of 30 minutes each. In addition, three 20-minute programmes were made from film that was not used in the main series. These were broadcast by the BBC in February and March 1979 as part of a series entitled "Out of the Past". Follow up programmes were broadcast 20 years and 30 years after the project, featuring some of the participants.

== Events during series ==
=== Settlement ===
The series began with the group building its Iron Age settlement with a hybrid of modern work tools and ancient tools, giving them time to adjust and get their bearings for living in an ancient time. The settlement they built was based on a nearby archaeological site dated to around the same time in the Iron Age. The living accommodation for the whole group was a substantial thatched roundhouse 48 ft (14.6 metres) in diameter and 30 ft (9.2 metres) high. There were smaller buildings to house livestock and for storage. The whole was enclosed by a bank and ditch with a palisade fence on top of the bank. The group lived on site from February 1977 until the end of March 1978. From April 1977 the group began to phase out the modern tools using ancient tools and techniques. Their accommodation in two person tents ceased on 30 April 1977 when they moved into the still unfinished roundhouse.

=== Fire ===
Fire was the central to their Iron Age existence. It was essential for cooking, warmth, blacksmithing, pottery, and even wood work where a hot metal rod was used to burn holes in wood. A fire was kept continuously burning in the centre of the roundhouse. After struggling with fire making for some time the group eventually mastered the technique using a fire drill and block made of willow.

=== Food ===
For the first ten weeks the group survived on food and supplies from supermarkets. But once the harsh weather relented and the settlement was self-sufficient, the group grew its own crops and used domesticated animals for dairy and meat. The settlement had several goats, cows, sheep, pig, chickens and geese for the group's use. Breakfast almost every day consisted of porridge of boiled wheat with milk and, if any was present, honey. On Sundays they treated themselves to bread with smeared honey and perhaps butter.

Their diet can be said to have consisted primarily of wheat, milk and meat. One of the daily tasks for the entire group was milling wheat for bread on a small quern. They made a soft curd cheese out of goat milk almost daily. They also had meat frequently which they obtained by slaughtering their animals although some group members were vegetarians. Eggs and fish were occasional food. Field beans and peas, parsnips and leeks were grown by the group as they are thought to have been available foods in Britain at the time. Many other foods were not grown or eaten by the group because they would not have been available. These 'not Iron Age' foods included potatoes, rice, cabbage, carrots, swede, onion, turnip. Seasonal foraging for things such as wild garlic, young beech and lime tree leaves, mushrooms, blackberries and hazel nuts supplemented their diet for short periods during the spring and autumn. Hunting for rabbits, hares and the occasional pheasant made occasional additions to the regular diet.

The cooking was done communally with each couple being responsible for the meals and the fire for 24 hours from after evening meal each day. This included responsibility for keeping the fire alight and collecting fire wood. The day following cooking day was baking day when the couple were responsible for baking sufficient bread for the group. This was done in a dome shaped clay oven that was first heated by a fire inside it, then kept warm as the bread cooked with a much reduced fire still inside the oven. Bread consumption was a measure of the group's appetite. This peaked at around 10 loafs a day during hay making when the day length was longest, falling to around 3 loafs a day in December. Interestingly bread demand correlated with day length rather than temperature.

=== Hygiene ===
The group washed with water and clay, which didn't disinfect, but, as they found, was suitable to remove dirt and other impurities from their skin and hair. Each day one couple would have 'bath day' which for convenience always coincided with 'baking day'. The couple were in the house and tending the oven fire so it made sense. The bath was a wooden half barrel. The water was heated by placing pieces of iron in the fire, then lifting them out with the blacksmith's tongs and plunging them into the water. That's probably not what Iron Age people did with highly precious pieces of iron but it did work. Yes, there were some technical compromises. A similar 'hot iron' method was used to sterilise milk vessels, which could quite quickly be brought up to boiling. Digestive upsets were rare.

=== Labour ===
As well as the cooking, firewood gathering, and baking there was the daily routine of feeding and milking the animals. Two, three or four people were responsible for each type of animal. Each group had a carefully worked out rota to ensure that everyone was freed from animal care on their cooking day, and also had periodic rest days to enable lying in bed a little longer.

The group spent about six weeks in June and July cutting hay with sickles to stock to keep the animals supplied for the coming winter. July and August were harvest time for wheat, barley, oats, peas and field beans. The success of the crops was variable. Wheat did well, field beans were terrible.

The villagers also learn how to fish, succeeding in catching a few grayling, and they set up a large fish trap in a shallow lake that was unsuccessful.

=== Pagan ritual ===
The group reenacted Celtic festivals:- Bealtaine on 1 May, Mid summer, Lughnasa on 1 August, Samhain on 1 November, winter solstice, and Imbolc on 1 February. For Samhain the group made and erected a fifteen-foot wicker man that they ceremonially burned. The group foraged elderberries from nearby plants and had fermented elderberry wine to drink during the festival.

=== Crafts ===
The autumn and winter gave time for the group to develop their craft skills. This included making clothes by spinning, dying, and weaving wool for their flock of sheep, tanning hides, knitting, sprang, blacksmithing, smelting (unsuccessfully), basket making, pottery and wood work. One group member made a lute. Two or three members worked together to build a cart which was pulled by two of the cows. This involved making a yoke and training the cows to it. They also made simple ard pulled by the cows to plough the field.

=== Archaeology ===
The project was set up primarily as a social project but several archeologists visited the site during the year, both to give advice and for their own interest, including Barry Cunliffe. It was suggested that while the project could not prove anything about how people lived in 300BC it did suggest a wider range of possible explanations for the phenomena found in archaeological excavations. An archeologist from Bristol University (name needed) mapped and recorded the site with a view to one day carrying out an archeological dig.

=== Publicity ===
There was great media interest in the project. Journalists had arranged visits the site once when it was being set up and again towards the end. An visit occurred after heavy snowfall in February 1978. The site was cut off by road, but two journalists from the Daily Mirror arrived by helicopter. Only the cooks were there in the settlement, the others were out enjoying the snow on makeshift toboggans using old barrel staves. Most national daily newspapers ran articles on the project, and several overseas papers too. It is possibly the only event ever to make the front pages of The New York Times and The Beano in the same week.

=== Departure ===
One couple decided to leave the settlement early in December when one of their children became ill. Although the child was not seriously ill, the parents felt more comfortable taking him home.

When the year was up the rest of the group celebrated with champagne brought in when journalists from the outside world visited. They took several possessions they had made during the year with them and were taken to a luxury hotel in Bath, Somerset. Before they departed the fire in the centre of the round house was built up so that it would burn for as long as possible.

To this day the group maintains that the experiment was paramount in teaching them to be self-sufficient and be able to survive like Iron Age people if need be.

To stop the area from becoming a tourist attraction in the quiet section of woods where it was located, the settlement was burned down a few months after the project ended.

== Follow-up programmes ==
A follow-up programme aired in the same year, Living in the Present, discovered what the participants had thought of the experiment and how they were adjusting back to modern day living.

In 2001 the BBC repeated the experiment with for a three-month period Surviving the Iron Age, which included three children of 'Living in the Past' cast members.

In 2008, BBC Four's What Happened Next? revisited participants of the original series thirty years after their year living together.
