= John Minsheu =

English linguist and lexicographer (1560–1627)

John Minsheu (or Minshew) (1560–1627) was an English linguist and lexicographer.

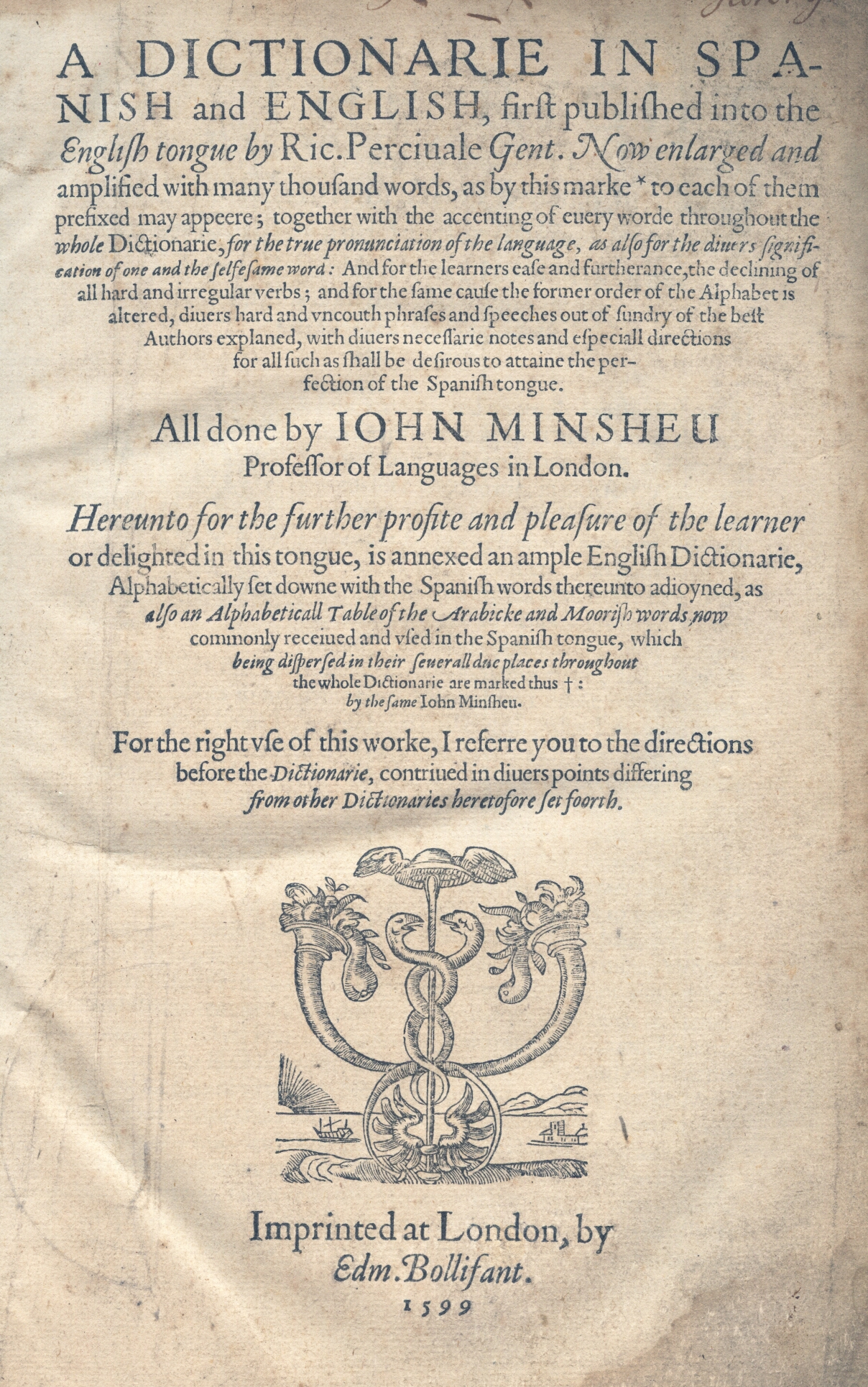
Works of John Minsheu

== Biography ==
He was born and died in London. Little is known about his life. He published some of the earliest dictionaries and grammars of the Spanish language for speakers of English. His major work was the Ductor in linguas (Guide into tongues), an eleven-language dictionary. With his Ductor in linguas he is also one of the first known inventors of the use of subscription as a method of funding publication of a book.

He also expanded Richard Percivale's Spanish dictionary.

== Works ==
- Joyful Newes out of the Newe Founde Worlde (1577)
- Spanish Grammar (1599)
- Dictionarie in Spanish and English (1599 & 1623), an augmented version of Bibliotheca Hispanica (1591) by Richard Percyvall (1993 reprint: ISBN 3-89131-066-8)
- Ductor in linguas (The Guide into Tongues) (1617)
  - including Vocabularium Hispanicolatinum et Anglicum copiossissimum (A Most Copious Spanish Dictionarie with Latine and English)
- Pleasant and Delightfull Dialogues in Spanish and English (1623)

== Sources ==
- Jürgen Schäfer, John Minsheu: Scholar or Charlatan?, in Renaissance Quarterly, Vol. 26, No. 1 (Spring, 1973), pp. 23–35.
- GIGA Quotes
- Some Notes on the Life and Work of John Minsheu (1560–1627)*, Vivian Salmon, London (PDF)
