= British Cellophane =

Cellophane manufacturing company

Coordinates: 51.1407°N 2.9859°W

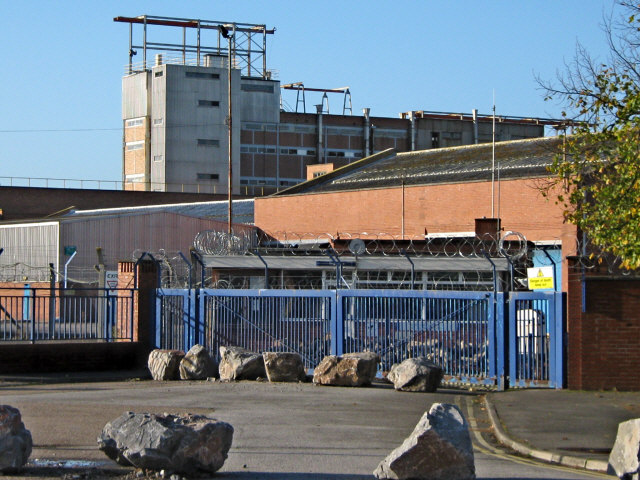
The factory after closure in 2008

British Cellophane Ltd (BCL) was a joint venture company formed in 1935 between La Cellophane SA and Courtaulds, when they began building a major factory for producing Cellophane in Bridgwater, Somerset, England.

== History ==
=== 19th century ===
The process for manufacturing cellulose film from viscose was discovered by three English chemists, Charles Frederick Cross, Edward John Bevan and Clayton Beadle in 1898.

=== 20th century ===
There followed a series of joint ventures and technology transfers among a number of companies predominantly in the UK and France. However, it was not until 1913 that Dr Jacques Brandenberger brought thin transparent cellulose film into true commercial production at the 'La Cellophane SA factory in Bezons, France.

In 1937 British Cellophane set up production on a site in Bridgwater, when unemployment levels in the town were high. The new buildings covered 59 acres (24 ha) of the former Sydenham Manor fields, and had direct railway access. The factory produced cellophane up until late 1940 during World War II, when it started switching production to war munitions and specifically Bailey bridges for the pending invasion of Europe. These were first used in Italy in 1943 by the Royal Engineers. Production ramped up through early-1944 for D-Day.

After the war the Bridgwater factory returned to producing cellophane, with its products exported worldwide. In 1957, a secondary facility was started at Barrow in Furness in Lancashire (now in Cumbria). A subsidiary Colodense Ltd, of Bedminster, Bristol produced specialist printed and coloured bags for loose food packaging in supermarkets. In 1962 it was employing 750+ people. In 1974 the company won the Queen's Award to Industry and by the late 1970s the site produced 40,000 tonnes of cellophane packaging film a year, employing 3,000 people. In 1982 it entered the 'Bag in a Box' market with a new plant at Ashton Vale Bristol, (CLP) 'Colendense Liquid Packaging Ltd', producing liquid packaging bags for the growing take home consumer wine and cider market and producing associated filling machines. In 1988 three separate factories on the site were producing cellulose and polyethylene film, and bonded fibre fabric. The rail link closed in 1994, and the Barrow factory was closed after the company was bought by UCB Films (later Innovia Films). The Barrow-in-Furness plant then employed 450 people.

=== 21st century ===
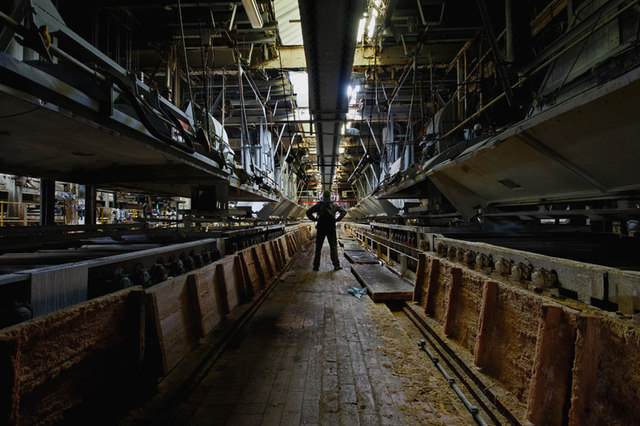
The interior of the factory

In 2004, due to dwindling sales of cellophane as a result of alternative packaging options, and the fact that viscose was becoming less favoured because of the polluting effects of carbon disulfide and other by-products of the process, Innovia decided to close one of its two plants at either Bridgwater or Tecumseh, east of Topeka, Kansas. British economic development officials offered a $120,000 tax break over three years to Innovia to preserve the Bridgwater plant, while Kansas offered $2 million if it kept the plant at Tecumseh open. As a result, the Bridgwater factory closed in the summer of 2005, while the factory in Tecumseh remained open . 250 jobs were lost, and the site is still under development as of January 2013.

In 2012 EDF purchased the site, including the Grade II listed 16th-century building. In 2015 the industrial site was razed to the ground. It is intended for construction of temporary accommodation for 1,000 workers involved in the construction of Hinkley Point C nuclear power station.

== Archives ==
Records of Colodense Limited are held at Bristol Archives (Ref. 43979).
