= Kittisford =

Village in Somerset, England

Coordinates: 50.9944°N 3.3194°W

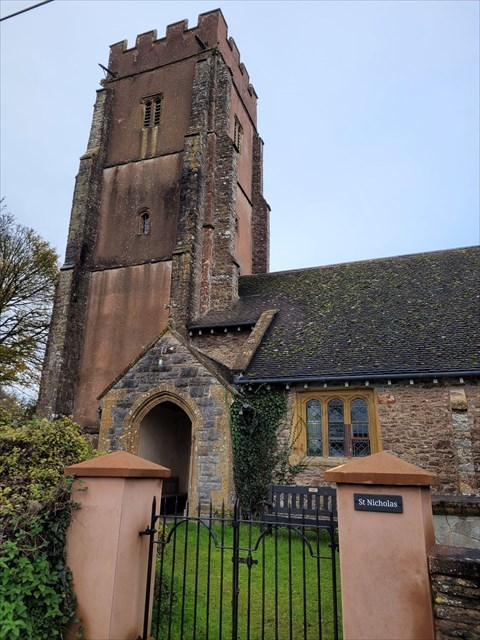
- St Nicholas Church

- Location within Somerset
- OS grid reference: ST075225
- Civil parish: Stawley
- Unitary authority: Somerset
- Ceremonial county: Somerset
- Region: South West
- Country: England
- Sovereign state: United Kingdom
- Postcode district: TA21
- Police: Avon and Somerset
- Fire: Devon and Somerset
- Ambulance: South Western
- UK Parliament: Tiverton and Minehead

Kittisford is a village and former civil parish and manor, now in the parish of Stawley in the Somerset district, in the ceremonial county of Somerset, England, situated 7 miles (11 km) west of Taunton. In 1931 the parish had a population of 92. On 1 April 1933 the parish was abolished and merged with Stawley.

The parish Church of St Nicholas was built around 1500 altered in the mid 17th century and was restored in 1875. It is a Grade II* listed building dedicated to St Nicholas. In the church survives a monumental brass to Richard Bluett (d.1524) and his wife Agnes Verney.

Gerald Gardiner took the title "Baron Gardiner of Kittisford" when he was made a life peer.

== Historic estates ==
The Manor of Kittisford, of which the manor house is known as Kittisford Barton. The building was constructed in the late 15th or early 16th century.
