= Percevault =

Percevault is a French surname meaning to pierce the valley or to breach the valley. Variants of Percevault include Persevault, Perceval, and Percival.

== People with the surname ==
- Christian Percevault, Mayor of Épeigné-les-Bois, France
- Guy Percevault, Mayor of Saint-Maurice-en-Trièves, France
- Jean-Dominique Percevault, general president director of Services Petrolier Schlumberger for the Centre for European Policy Studies
- Julieta Venegas Percevault (born 1970), American-born Mexican singer, songwriter, instrumentalist, and producer
