= Benjamin Allen (British politician) =

Benjamin Allen (c. 1732 – October 1791) was an English barrister who sat in the House of Commons from 1768 to 1781.

Allen was the son of John Allen MD FRS, of Bridgwater. He attended school in Bridgwater before in 1751 being admitted to Sidney Sussex College, Cambridge, aged nineteen. He entered the Middle Temple in 1749 and was called to the bar in 1754.

Allen became a member of the corporation of Bridgwater and after cultivating his connections was returned as one of the two Members of Parliament for Bridgwater in the 1768 general election against the powerful Poulett interest. He was returned unopposed in 1774, but had a contest in 1780. He was initially returned, but was unseated on an election petition in 1781. He then carried on as a barrister and as a member of the Bridgwater corporation.

Allen died before 1792. His son Jeffreys Allen was returned as one of the members for Bridgwater in 1796.

Parliament of Great Britain
Preceded by Viscount Perceval; The Lord Coleraine	Member of Parliament for Bridgwater; 1768–1781; With: Viscount Perceval 1768-1769; Hon. Anne Poulett 1769-1781	Succeeded by Hon. Anne Poulett; John Acland
