= Jacky Gillott =

English novelist and television reporter

- Born: Jacqueline Anne Gillott; 24 September 1939; Bromley, Kent, England
- Died: 19 September 1980 (aged 40); Pitcombe, Somerset, England
- Occupations: Novelist; broadcaster

Jacqueline Anne Gillott (24 September 1939 – 19 September 1980) was an English novelist and broadcaster. She was one of Britain's first female television reporters.

== Life and career ==
Born in Bromley, Kent, Gillott attended University College London. She worked as a journalist for a provincial newspaper before starting a television career with Independent Television News. She later presented programmes on the BBC, including early editions of the Film Show. She also wrote five successful novels between 1968 and 1979.

== Personal life and death ==
Gillott was married to the television producer John Percival, and they had two sons. They moved to a small farm in Somerset in 1972 to live as near as possible to self-sufficiency; she wrote about their experiences in a book, Providence Place (1977).

After suffering from depression and marital troubles, Gillott killed herself at her cottage in Pitcombe, Somerset, on 24 September 1980. She was 40 years old.

After her death, Gillott and Percival's friend and neighbour John Fowles described her as "a brittle, sexy, faintly raucous persona always", but noted that underneath there was somebody "ugly, confused, uncertain – all that she didn't sound on TV or radio".

== Books ==
- Salvage 1968
- War Baby 1971
- For Better, for Worse: Marriage and the Family 1971 (non-fiction)
- A True Romance 1976
- Crying Out Loud 1976
- Providence Place: Animals in a Landscape 1977 (non-fiction)
- The Head Case 1979
- Intimate Relations and Other Stories 1980

Gillott's journalism included the posthumously published memoir "Twelfth Man", a contribution to Michael Meyer's cricket anthology Summer Days (1981), in which she wrote: "I have cricket to thank for the healing knowledge that nothing in this world lacks a comic profile and that it is more pleasurable to laugh in company than it is to laugh alone. Thus armoured, one can overcome the hurt and disappointment of many a thing ..."
