= Parsifal (disambiguation) =

Parsifal is an 1882 opera by Richard Wagner relating the story of the Arthurian knight Percival.

Parsifal may also refer to:

== Films ==
- Parsifal (1904 film), a silent film based on Wagner's opera directed by Edwin S. Porter
- Parsifal (1909 film), a silent film directed by Mario Caserini
- Parsifal (1912 film), a silent film directed by Mario Caserini
- The Evil Forest (Spanish: Parsifal), a 1951 Spanish film directed by Daniel Mangrané
- Parsifal (1982 film), based on Wagner's opera, directed by Hans-Jürgen Syberberg
- Parsifal, a made-for-television film of the 1981 Bayreuth Festival production, broadcast in 1982, directed by Brian Large

== Literature ==
- Parsifal (book), a 2009 book by Jindřich Pokorný
- Parzival, a medieval romance by the poet Wolfram von Eschenbach
- Parzival, the protagonist's avatar name in the sci-fi novel Ready Player One

== Other uses ==
- 2095 Parsifal, an asteroid
- Parsifal (train), a Paris-Dortmund express train 1957–1997
- Parsifal III (yacht)
- PARSIFAL Project EU, a European research project on critical financial infrastructure
- Parsifal Reparato, Italian filmmaker and anthropologist, director of the 2025 feature documentary She

== See also ==
- Percival (disambiguation)
