= John Allen (physician) =

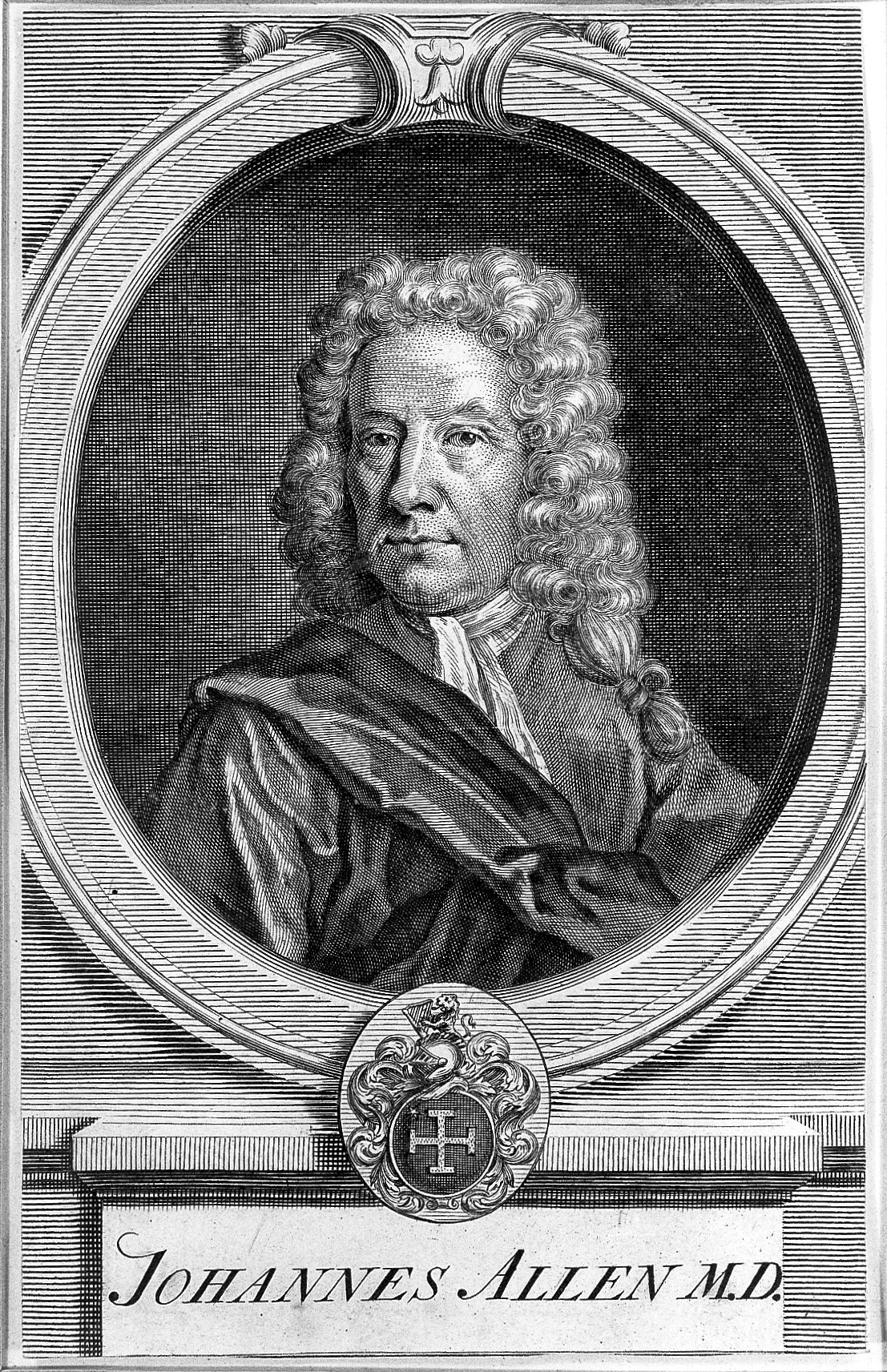

John Allen, or John Alleyn (1660? – 1741), was an English physician and inventor, mainly remembered for writing medical text books.

== Biography ==
Allen, the date of whose birth is not positively known, was an M.D., but of what university does not appear. He was admitted extra-licentiate of the College of Physicians on 13 September 1692; practised, and apparently died, at Bridgwater, Somerset.

Allen published in 1719 Synopsis universæ Medicinæ practicæ; sive doctissimorum Virorum de Morbis eorumque causis ac remediis judicia, a work which became extremely popular, being printed in many editions at home and abroad, both in Latin and translated into modern languages. This work claims to be entirely practical, and not to deal with the new views and hypotheses which abounded in the medicine of the time, but makes no pretensions to originality. It gives, under the head of each disease, the opinions of various authors, ancient and modern, to which the writer added, especially in later editions, certain observations of his own.

Allen published also Specimina Ichnographica; or a brief narrative of several new inventions and experiments. These inventions were three: (1) a new method of saving coal in the engine for raising water by fire (i.e. Savery and Newcomen's atmospheric steam-engine) by enclosing the fire within the boiler; (2) a further proposal to place such an engine, made by this improvement more portable, in a ship, and, by forcing water out of the stern, to make the vessel move, so that it could be navigated in a calm; if ever carried out, this would have been probably the first known model of a steamship; and (3) a new method of drying malt. These inventions were patented in 1729. Allen is also said to have invented a new model of a chariot going on steel springs, probably at that time a novelty.

In 1730 Allen was elected a fellow of the Royal Society, to which he had in 1716 communicated a paper containing the plan of a ‘Perpetual Log’ for ships.

He died 16 September 1741. His son Benjamin Allen was MP for Bridgwater.
