= Frederick Perceval, 11th Earl of Egmont =

Canadian farmer (1914–2001)

The Right Honourable The Earl of Egmont
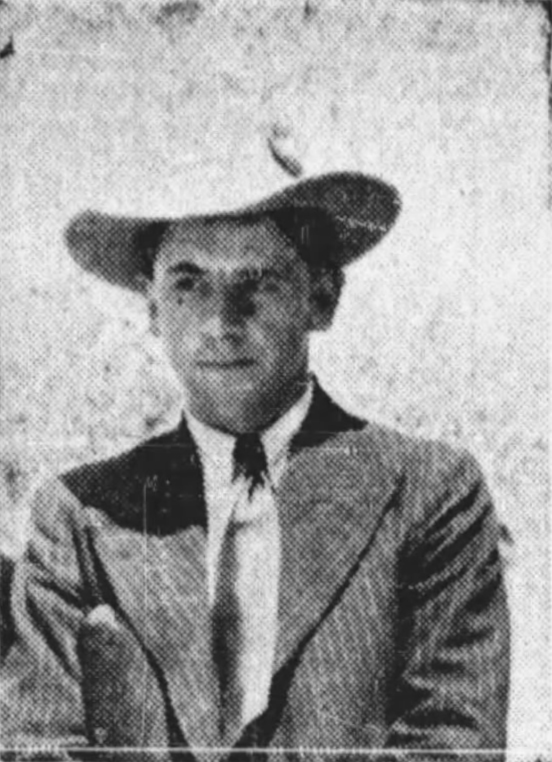
- Perceval in 1932
- Born: Frederick George Moore Perceval; 14 April 1914; Calgary, Alberta, Canada
- Died: 8 December 2001 (aged 87); Nanton, Alberta, Canada
- Spouse: Geraldine Moodie (m. 1934; died 1995)
- Children: 8

Member of the House of Lords
- Lord Temporal
- as a hereditary peer 16 May 1932 – 11 November 1999
- Preceded by: 10th Earl of Egmont
- Succeeded by: Seat abolished

Frederick George Moore Perceval, 11th Earl of Egmont (14 April 1914 – 8 December 2001), was a Canadian farmer and peer. Born in Calgary, Perceval and his father moved to Avon Castle in Ringwood, Hampshire upon the latter's ascension as the 10th Earl of Egmont. When he died in 1932, Perceval inherited his estate and title and promptly moved back to Canada. Marrying Geraldine Moodie in August, they soon built a home on a piece of land they bought right outside Priddis, Alberta, where Perceval was raised. When a fire destroyed that home, they built a new one and sold Avon Castle. They bought the Two-Dot Ranch in 1959 at Nanton, Alberta, where Perceval died in 2001. He was succeeded by his son Thomas as the 12th earl.

== Life and career ==
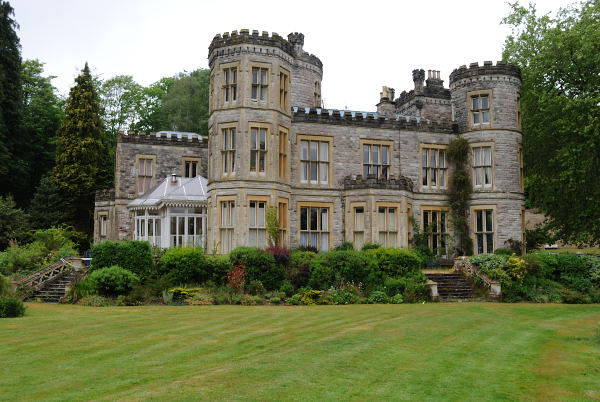
2010 photograph of Avon Castle, the Perceval family estate

Frederick George Moore Perceval was born on 14 April 1914 in Calgary, Alberta, to Frederick Joseph Travelyan and Cecilia Perceval. His parents had immigrated to Alberta in 1900. Perceval was raised in Priddis, where his parents had bought a ranch. Cecilia died two years after the birth of Perceval on 12 December 1916, which led to a closer relationship between Perceval and his father. In 1929, his father became the 10th Earl of Egmont after the death of their distant cousin Charles Perceval, 9th Earl of Egmont. The 10th Earl and his son moved to England, where they lived at the family's seat Avon Castle in Ringwood, Hampshire. After the inheritance, two people attempted to challenge the claim to both the title and land: a baker from Hornsey claiming he was born in Australia to the brother of the 6th Earl of Egmont; and a retired optician from Lancaster. Both cases were dismissed in court; however, the House of Lords did not recognise the Percevals' claim until 1939, several years after the death of the 10th Earl. Frederick and his father would often do chores around the castle themselves; this earned Frederick's father the nickname "the loneliest peer in England", with Frederick himself being nicknamed "the loneliest boy in the world".

In May 1932 the 10th Earl died in a car accident in Southampton, with 18-year-old Perceval inheriting both the title and his roughly million-dollar estate. As Earl of Egmont, Perceval was entitled to sit in the House of Lords—the upper house of the Parliament of the United Kingdom—from 16 May 1932 to 11 November 1999, when the House of Lords Act 1999 was passed, excluding all but ninety-two hereditary peers from the House. Perceval never took his seat, described as having rather sit on a horse than in the House. Like his father, Perceval felt unhappy living in England and moved back to Canada in June.

Doubtless the late earl's accent and manners may, like his boots, have been a shade too thick for the fine carpets of Hampshire. Doubtless he was no master of small talk, because on an Alberta ranch, if you talk at all, the subjects will probably be pretty big. They may be kittle cattle but they certainly won't be tittle tattle.

— James Agate of the Sunday Express criticizing the secludedness of the Percevals

Two months after arriving, on 31 August 1932, he married his cousin Geraldine Moodie, an orthodontic nurse. During their honeymoon, the couple was followed by journalists, and Perceval was described as being "the only member of the House of Lords who could rope, throw and brand a steer". Perceval and Moodie had eight children: Thomas, Gordon, June Rose, Patrick, Frederick, Donald, Geraldine, and Elizabeth. They were also the foster parents of a girl, Connie. Moodie died on 2 July 1995, after a prolonged illness.

For a while the newly-wed couple were unsure where they wanted to live, and often moved between England and southern Alberta. They ended up settling in Alberta and bought roughly 680 acres (280 ha) of land right outside Priddis on the intersection of Macleod Trail and Willow Park Drive, building a Tudor-styled home on it. After the home burned down in 1938, they temporarily moved to England, where Perceval bought a car he travelled the country with and planned to send his son to Eton College. Eventually, they decided to stay in Priddis where Perceval built a new 26-room house, selling Avon Castle for $378,000.

In 1959 their property, Egmont Ranch, was threatened by urban sprawl. As a result, Perceval sold the ranch to the Kelwood Corporation, reported at a price to be roughly £350,000 ($980,000) and he bought the Two-Dot Ranch at Nanton—sized at 5,080 acres (2,060 ha; 20.6 km^{2}; 7.94 sq mi)—from Claude Gallinger for $284,000. After the approval of the House of Lords Act 1999, Perceval reportedly expressed regrets about not taking his seat in the House.

Perceval died at his ranch of heart failure on 8 December 2001. He was buried at St. Mary's Cemetery in Calgary in a private ceremony on 10 December. He was succeeded by his son Thomas as the 12th Earl of Egmont and Two-Dot Ranch was auctioned off.
