= Sir John Perceval, 1st Baronet =

Irish nobleman

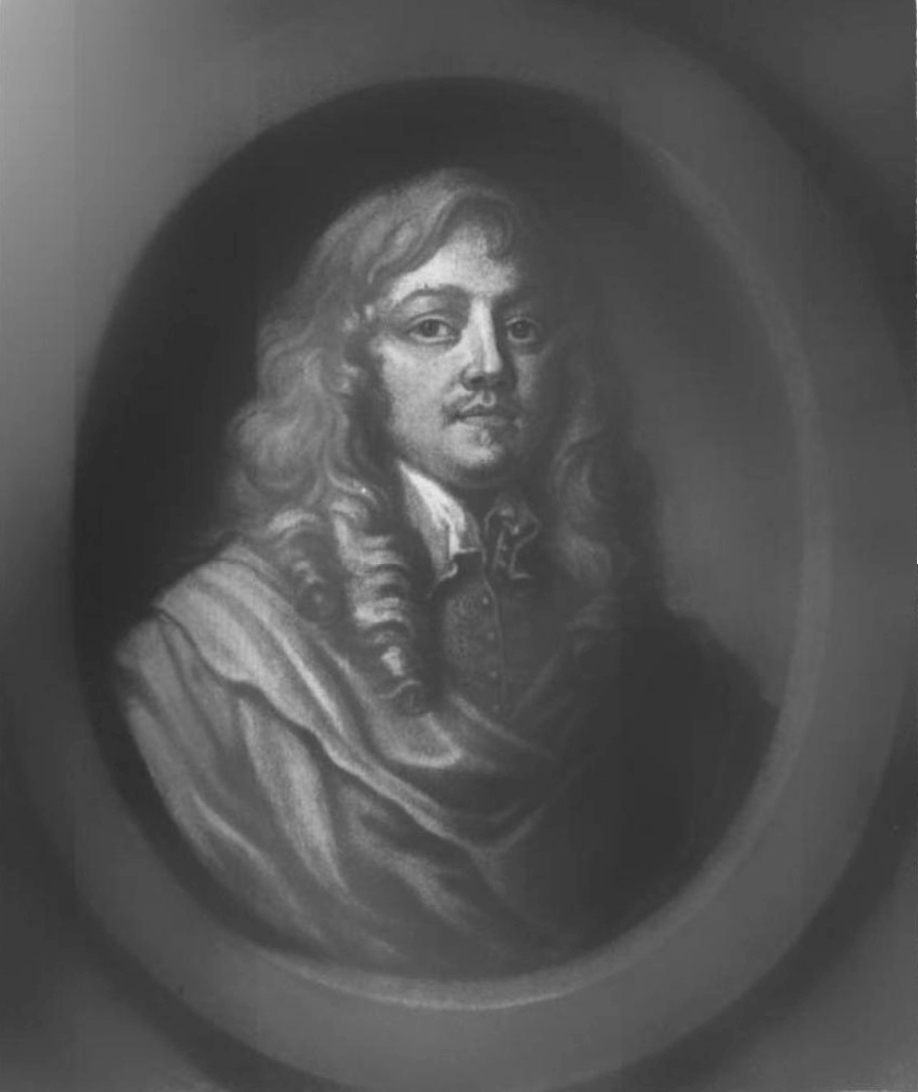
Sir John Perceval, 1st Baronet (1629–1665) by I Faber (1743).

Sir John Perceval, 1st Baronet (7 September 1629 – 1 November 1665) was an Irish nobleman and landowner. He was knighted by Henry Cromwell for his services to the Commonwealth government of Ireland during the Interregnum. Shortly before the Restoration, he held the offices of Chief Prothonotary of the Common Pleas and Clerk of the Crown. After the Restoration, he was granted a baronetcy and given a full pardon for his activities during the Interregnum. He was appointed Privy Councillor to King Charles II, a Knight of the Shire for County Cork, and was a member of the Council of Trade.

== Early life ==
John Perceval was born on 7 September 1629 in Dublin. He was the eldest son and heir of Sir Philip Perceval (1605–1647) (the son of Richard Perceval) and of Catherine, the daughter of Arthur Usher of Dublin, and grandson to George Perceval. He was tutored in the home counties of England alongside Lord Inchequin's eldest son who had been placed under the guardianship of Sir Philip Perceval while his father was engaged in the Civil War in Ireland. John Perceval went to Cambridge University in February 1646 when he was sixteen.

While at Cambridge he met and befriended Henry Cromwell. His father died the following year, and John Perceval decided that, with wars raging in both England and Ireland, he would remain at university and so remain out of public life to avoid choosing sides in the wars. In 1649, after the execution of Charles I, the rebellion in Ireland was crushed by the New Model Army under the command of Oliver Cromwell. Given Perceval's large holdings in Ireland, he thought it politic to return to protect his interests. This was difficult because his father had opposed the English Independents who were now in the ascendancy.

As well as protecting his lands, Perceval proposed to marry the daughter of the Speaker of the Rump Parliament William Lenthall who would then protect his estates for the benefit of his daughter. However, with the diminution of Lenthall's influence within the Commonwealth, the marriage fell through.

Perceval's father Sir Philip Perceval, was in the Irish government and originally supported Cromwell. However, he later opposed the New Model Army. On his death, Cromwell calculated that his son could be of use and he protected John Perceval's interests in the short term, hoping to use him as an ally in the longer term. The first example of this support occurred in England in 1650 when the Somerset sequestration committee proposed that Perceval's holdings in Somerset should be sequestrated. The matter was taken up in London and, through Cromwell's intervention, settled in favour of Perceval.

In Ireland, the Commonwealth sequestered all of Perceval's estates. Perceval prevented absolute confiscation and as his interests improved, this severity relaxed. However, he was obliged to pay large sums to the Commonwealth. For example, in the year 1 May 1650, to 1 May 1651 for his Munster estate, he contributed £1,965 and, in the following year, his contribution amounted to £200 more than the estate produced.

== First Commonwealth ==
Once Sir John Perceval was of age, he laid claim to all of his father's estates in Ireland, amounting to seventy-eight and a half Knight's Fees, containing 101,000 acres, of some of the best land in Ireland. (Note: The figure given in the primary source is 62,502 Irish acres followed by 999,900 English acres. However, as the footnote to the source makes clear the correct figure from Irish acres to English acres is about 101,000 acres. This matches the figure published for his father's holdings (see Philip Perceval) and there is no reason for his holding to have grown while he was in England.) There were holdings in the counties of: Cork, Tipperary, Catherlough, Waterford, Kerry, Mayo, Kildare, and Dublin. There were some other estates over which he had control, some were already in his possession, some belonged to his mother, and he was also paid a small amount of rent from housing in Dublin City. Oliver Cromwell, who was in Ireland finishing his campaign against the Irish confederates and Royalists, supported Perceval in his claim.

When Cromwell left Ireland in the middle of May 1650 to take the war to Scotland, (and on to the Commonwealth's ultimate victory at the Battle of Worcester on 3 September 1651), Henry Ireton, his son-in-law, remained in Ireland as Lord Deputy in Cromwell's place. Militarily he met little further resistance and was left with a mopping-up operation. After his death, his successor, Edmund Ludlow, was faced with even less effective military opposition, and after Charles Fleetwood arrived in Ireland with supreme command, the English establishment was confident enough of their hold on Ireland that the English Parliament declared the rebellion totally subdued on 26 September 1651. (Note: 26 September 1651 "Act for setting apart 24 October as a Day of Public Thanksgiving, with a narrative declaring the grounds and reasons thereof")

The next issue facing the English Parliament was what sort of settlement to impose on Ireland. This included a High Commission to try those who had been in arms against the Commonwealth, many of whom were transported and their lands sequestrated, and the banishing of known Roman Catholics to Connaught and the confiscation of their lands. Oliver Cromwell sent Sir John Perceval to assist General Charles Fleetwood with this task. Fleetwood was impressed with Perceval's service, and wrote to England saying as much. In recognition of this service, Perceval was granted the office of King's Bench, which had been sequestrated with his estate from the time of his father's death. On 6 July 1653, the office of Commissioners of Revenue was told to allow him to receive the entire income from his estates. To provide a suitable living for himself, pay off some of his father's debts, and form a dowry for his sister, he sold 15,000 acres of his best land in a depressed market.

== Protectorate ==
In December 1653 the Council of Officers introduced a written constitution into the Commonwealth called the Instrument of Government and under its provisions declared Oliver Cromwell Lord Protector. Perceval travelled to London in May 1654 and while there renewed his friendship with Henry Cromwell and had an audience with Oliver. He was invited to sit in the First Protectorate Parliament but declined because he thought that his public and private commitments in Ireland should take priority.

When he saw what a debacle the First Protectorate Parliament had become, Perceval decided to distance himself from the regime, concluding that it could not last. He had been working with Roger, Lord Broghill and one of his tenants, Vincent Gookin, in the interests of the Commonwealth but, on his return from England in July 1655, he retired to his castle at Liscarroll and tried to keep out of public affairs as much as possible. It was during this sojourn that he married and started a family (see below). He worked to improve his estates by inviting Protestant farmers to take up tenancies while retaining Roman Catholic tenants who had proved loyal to his family during the rebellion. When his friend Henry Cromwell arrived in Ireland as the New Deputy Governor, Perceval had no choice but to take a more active role in government as to do otherwise would have aroused suspicion. In November 1656 Oliver Cromwell appointed him one of the "commissioners of the Security of his own Person and Continuation of the Nation in Peace and Safety". This meant that Royalist supporters saw Perceval as one of the stalwarts of the Protectorate. Cromwell invited Perceval to sit in Cromwell's Other House but he declined. Despite this he was knighted by Henry Cromwell on 22 July 1658 for his services to the Commonwealth.

== Second Commonwealth ==
It was largely due to the counsel of Perceval that Henry Cromwell stayed out of the anarchy that engulfed England after the death of his father; in particular his passive behaviour over his elder brother Richard's removal from the office of Lord Protector. This political move by Perceval stood him in good stead during the brief return of the Long Parliament and the Convention Parliament. In turn, he was appointed one of the four councillors to the President of Munster, and appointed by those commissioned by the President to manage the government of Ireland, Clerk of the Crown, Prothonotary of the Common-Pleas, and Keeper of the Public Accounts on 7 May 1660 preceding the return of the King on the 29th of the same month.

== Restoration ==
Soon after the restoration of the monarchy he was sworn in as a member of the Privy-Council, and on 9 September 1661 created Baronet Perceval of Kanturk. To secure his position, and so that his political enemies could not in the future use his conduct under the Commonwealth to attack him, Perceval obtained a Patent of Special Pardon for all treasons, rebellions, etc. and for all engagements, of which he might have been guilty, either under the Parliament of the Commonwealth, or the Protectorate, from the beginning of his life, to 29 December 1660. The Patent was dated Westminster, 22 April 1662 and was passed under the Great Seals of England and Ireland.

In 1661 Perceval was appointed Knight of the Shire for County Cork, and served in the Irish Parliament. In 1662 the parliament concluded the Act of Settlement in Ireland, which initiated the settling of outstanding constitutional issues for the next century or more.

In 1662 Perceval failed to prevent the passing of the Tenures Abolition Act which abolished feudalism in Ireland and the Court of Wards. This resulted in a loss to the Perceval family of £3,400 per annum. He received £5,000 as compensation.

In 1663 a plot by Colonel Jepson and some other former republican officers was discovered. Perceval was appointed foreman of the jury at their trial.

== Council of Trade ==
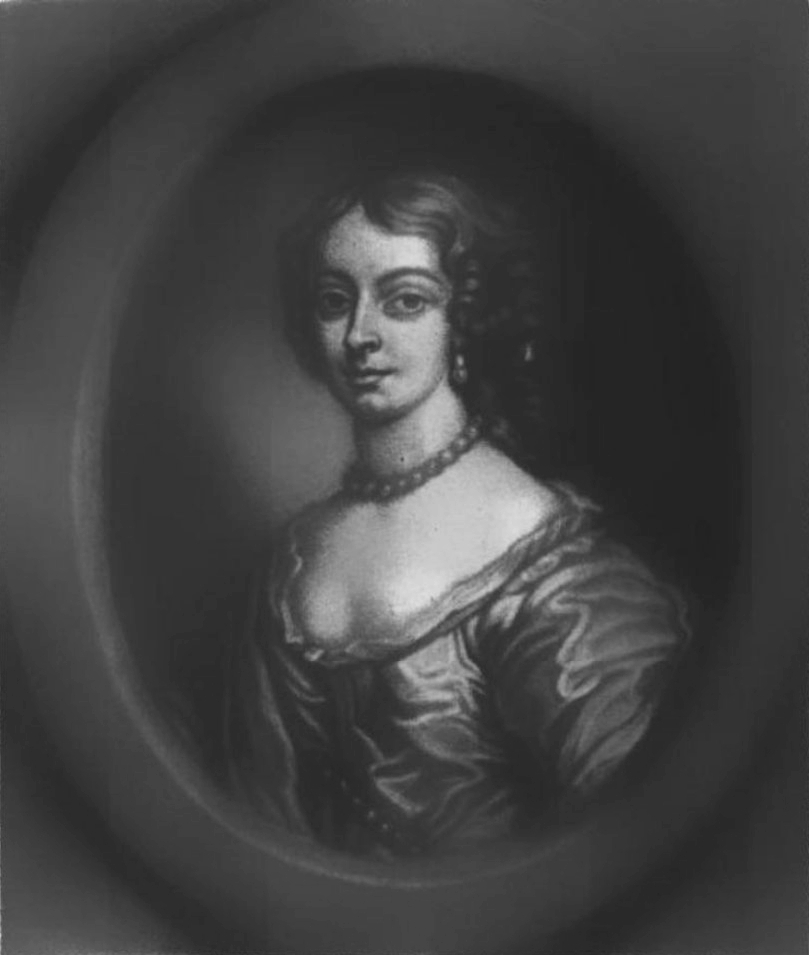
Catherine (1 September 1637 – 17 August 1679) the only daughter of Sir Robert Southwell of Kinsale, wife of Sir John Perceval, 1st Baronet. Engraved by I Faber Fecit (1743).

In 1664 Perceval was appointed to a Council of Trade to explore how trade between Ireland, Scotland and England could be enlarged as the Irish economy was in recession at that time. Since he held considerable properties in England as well as Ireland, he was an energetic committee member, and was considered to be less partisan than most.

== Death ==
While in England following up trade issues in 1664, he fell ill and returned to Ireland to see his wife who was also very ill. He lived long enough to see her but died soon afterwards, aged 36, on 1 November 1665 in Dublin and was buried in St. Audoen's Church, within the burial vault of his great-grandfather Sir William Usher. Perceval had intended to build a church at Burton, County Cork, and a magnificent monument had been designed to be erected there so it was thought sufficient at that time to place a simple memorial stone over his grave. In 1680 his son Sir Philip Perceval had been planning to erect a monument to his father within St. Audoen's Church, shortly before his own death.

== Family ==
He married Catherine the only daughter of Robert Southwell of Kinsale, and of Helena Gore on 14 February 1655. They had six children:

1. Sir Philip, born 12 January 1656 in Kinsale. Eldest son and heir. 2nd Baronet. Died on 11 September 1680 in Burton.
2. Robert, born 8 February 1657 in Kinsale. Murdered 5 June 1677 by an unknown assailant on The Strand, London.
3. Sir John, born 22 August 1660 near Burton. 3rd Baronet. Died on 23 April 1686 in Burton. Married Catherine Dering, daughter of Sir Edward Dering, and had issue including Sir Edward Perceval and John Perceval, 1st Earl of Egmont.
4. Charles, born 4 November 1661 in London. Died July 1662 in Kinsale.
5. Catherine, born 19 March 1662 in Dublin; died 1701. Married:(1) Sir William Moore, 2nd Baronet, and had issue, (2) Major John Montgomery and (3) Brig.-Gen. George Freak.
6. Helena, born 17 February 1665 in Kinsale after her father's death. Married Colonel Daniel Dering, younger son of Sir Edward Dering, 2nd Baronet and Mary Harvey, and had issue.

== Sources ==
- Shaw, William Arthur (1906), The Knights of England: A complete record from the earliest time to the present day of the knights of all the orders of chivalry in England, Scotland, and Ireland, and of knights bachelors, incorporating a complete list of knights bachelors dubbed in Ireland, vol. 2, London: Sherratt and Hughes

Baronetage of Ireland
| New creation | Baronet (of Kanturk); 1661–1665 | Succeeded by Philip Perceval |
