= Henry Perceval, 5th Earl of Egmont =

British peer and politician (1796–1841)

The Right Honourable The Earl of Egmont

Member of Parliament for East Looe
- In office March 1826 – June 1826 Serving with Thomas Potter Macqueen
- Preceded by: Thomas Potter Macqueen; George Watson-Taylor
- Succeeded by: William Lascelles; James Drummond Buller-Elphinstone

Personal details
- Born: Henry Frederick Joseph James Perceval; 3 January 1796
- Died: 23 February 1841 (aged 45)
- Spouse: Louisa Maria D'Orselet (after 1828)
- Parent(s): John Perceval, 4th Earl of Egmont; Bridget Wynn
- Education: Trinity College, Cambridge

Henry Frederick Joseph James Perceval, 5th Earl of Egmont (3 January 1796 – 23 December 1841), styled Viscount Perceval from 1822 to 1835, was a British peer and politician. An alcoholic from an early age, he inherited estates heavily encumbered by debt; avoiding writs for debt shaped much of his life. He was briefly elected a Member of Parliament (MP), but may never have taken his seat, and spent much of his life either abroad or living under an alias. His solicitor took personal advantage of the Earl's incapacity for business, resulting in belated litigation with the next Earl in 1863.

== Early life ==
Perceval was born on 3 January 1796 as the only son of John Perceval, 4th Earl of Egmont (1767–1835) and his wife, Bridget Wynn (d. 1826).

His paternal grandparents were John Perceval, 3rd Earl of Egmont, and the former Isabella Powlett (a daughter of Lord Nassau Powlett). His maternal grandparents were Lt.-Col. Glynn Wynn, MP for Caernarfon, and the former Bridget Pugh (a daughter of Edward Philip Pugh of Penrhyn-Creuddyn).

He was privately educated, and was admitted to Trinity College, Cambridge, on 21 September 1814. He received an MA in 1818.

== Career ==
By the time his father succeeded to the earldom in February 1822, the family estates at Churchtown, County Cork, and Enmore, Somerset, were heavily encumbered with debts. While his father's seat in the House of Lords protected him from prosecution for debt, Viscount Perceval, as he then was styled, was not so fortunate, and was often forced to leave the country to escape writs. He developed dissipated habits early in life, and became an alcoholic.

Perhaps to escape this wandering life, he began to seek a seat in Parliament (which would protect him from duns) in 1824, announcing he would stand for Penryn, where Henry Swann had fallen ill. However, Lord Perceval began his canvass too late to effectively compete for the vacancy and did not go to the poll. In March 1826, when George Watson-Taylor retired to take another seat, he was put in at East Looe on the interest of James Drummond Buller-Elphinstone. It is not clear that he ever took his seat; in April, his family's Irish agent and solicitor, Edward Tierney, was writing to him to beg him to "abandon his evil courses and his associates". He contested Penryn at the 1826 election, but was served with a writ, probably for debt, during the canvass and was defeated, lacking the means to make headway with a venal electorate.

Declared an outlaw for debt in 1828, Lord Perceval fled abroad. Perceval inherited his father's property on the latter's death in 1835; Enmore had been sold to pay debts in the previous year, while the Irish estates in North Cork were so heavily encumbered that no buyer could be found. While he did assume his seat in the House of Lords (as Baron Lovel and Holland) in February 1836, he afterwards lived at Burderop Park with a female companion, Mrs. Cleese, who had lived with him before at Hythe; he took the alias of "Mr. Lovell" and claimed she was his sister. Lord Egmont, as he now was styled, was often drunk and neglectful of business as regarded his estate, although a clergyman of his acquaintance thought him a gentleman and intelligent in conversation. A legal appeal of his outlawry in 1838 ended when his solicitors were unable to prove that he was still alive. He left the country for Portugal in 1840; after the death of Mrs. Cleese, he returned to England and died in 1841.

== Personal life ==
In December 1828, he married Louisa Maria D'Orselet, the daughter of Comte d'Orselet, in Paris. Their son was born about four months later, and died sometime between 1835 and 1841.

Upon his death in 1841, he was succeeded by his half-first cousin once removed, the 3rd Baron Arden.

=== Will and estates ===
Under the 5th Earl's will, Tierney was made sole executor and residuary legatee of the estate; the wills of the 4th and 5th Earls were not proven until 1857, after Tierney's death, by his son-in-law Sir William Darell. The 5th Earl's will was rather belatedly contested by the 6th Earl in 1863, on the grounds that Tierney had taken advantage of the 5th Earl's drunkenness to provide a misleading valuation of the estates which influenced the drafting of the will. The 6th Earl ultimately settled out of court with Darell, paying £125,000 for the return of the Irish estates; Tierney and his heirs had realised an estimated £300,000 for their stewardship.

Parliament of the United Kingdom
Preceded by Thomas Potter Macqueen; George Watson-Taylor	Member of Parliament for East Looe; March–June 1826; With: Thomas Potter Macqueen	Succeeded by William Lascelles; James Drummond Buller-Elphinstone
Peerage of Ireland
Preceded by John Perceval	Earl of Egmont; 1835–1841	Succeeded by George Perceval
