= Philip Perceval =

English politician and knight (1605-1647)

Sir Philip Perceval (1605 – 10 November 1647) was an English politician and knight. He was knighted in 1638, obtained grants of forfeited lands in Ireland to the amount of 101,000 acres (41,000 ha), and lost extensive property in Ireland owing to the rebellion of 1641. He opposed Charles I's intention of granting the demands of the Irish Confederates in order to employ them in England: joined the parliamentary party in 1644, obtaining a seat in the House of Commons of England as member for Newport, Cornwall, where he threw in his lot with the moderate presbyterians; compelled to retire into the country owing to his opposition to the independents, September 1647.

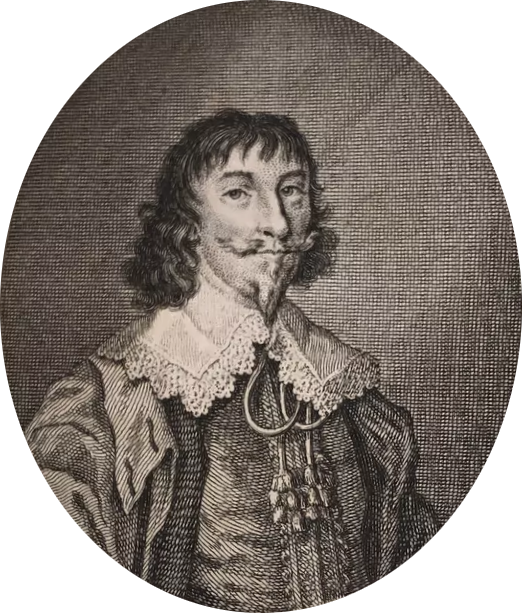
Sir Philip Perceval, by W. H. Toms, after Anthony van Dyck

== Biography ==
Philip was the younger of the two sons of Richard Perceval of Tickenham, Somerset, by his second wife Alice, daughter of John Sherman of Ottery St. Mary, Devon. Philip's elder brother Walter and himself had been appointed by their father joint successors in his office of registrar of the Irish court of wards. Walter died in 1624, so Philip obtained the family estates in England and Ireland, and the sole enjoyment of the Irish registrarship.

Perceval now definitely settled in Ireland, and by means of his interest at court gradually obtained a large number of additional offices. In 1625 he was made keeper of the records in Birmingham Tower. In 1628 he was joined with Henry Andrews in the offices of clerk of the crown to the Court of King's Bench (Ireland) and the Court of Common Pleas (Ireland), and keeper of the rolls of those tribunals; and in 1629 he was made joint collector of customs at Dublin with Sir Edward Bagshawe of Finglas. By early 1634 his friends in Dublin included Sir Philip Mainwaring and Sir George Radcliffe who were two of Wentworth's closest advisers. In 1636 Perceval was admitted to King's Inns, Dublin, and on 2 June the same year he was knighted by Lord Deputy of Ireland. Thomas Wentworth. In 1638 he, with Sir James Ware, obtained the monopoly of granting licenses for the sale of ale and brandy, and was also made a member of the privy council.

Perceval's energy was chiefly shown in the part he played in the prevailing jobbery connected with Irish landed estate. Holding, in this connection, the offices of general feodary of Ireland, escheator of Munster, and (1637) commissioner of survey into land titles in County Tipperary and County Cork, he took a prominent share in the discovery of technical defects in Irish titles; and obtained enormous transfers of forfeited lands to himself.

The importance of these acquisitions, which lay mainly in Cork, Tipperary, and Wexford, may be shown in two instances. In 1630 he obtained the manors of Haggardstown, Herfaston, and Blackrath in Tipperary, and a quarter part of Kilmoyleron in co. Cork, at the quit rent of £1. 7s. 5d. for all services, and special exemption from any taxes that might be laid thereon by parliament or any other authority. In 1637 he obtained the manor of Annagh, with numerous towns, castles, and lands adjoining it in Cork and Tipperary, the whole being, by special license of the crown, erected into the manor of Burton, with liberty to impark sixteen hundred acres, and right to enjoy numerous exceptional privileges.

By 1641 he is described as being possessed of the enormous amount of seventy-eight knights' fees and a half, containing 62,502 Irish acres, (about 101,000 acres (41,000 ha)), in the finest parts of the country, above £4,000 a year of the best rents, and a stock in woods, houses, &c., worth above £60,000, with employments for life of the value of above £2,000 a year, besides other employments of equal profit, which he held by an uncertain tenure. This list does not include his patrimonial estate of Burton in Somerset.

With the fall and execution of Wentworth (by then Earl of Strafford) in May 1641, Perceval had lost his major patron and protector. His part in the shady land transaction was revealed, and in September 1641 Perceval narrowly avoided prosecution in England.

Perceval was one of the few who perceived the approach of the Irish Rebellion of 1641, an event which his own extortion and chicanery had done much to produce. For example, some of the more rich and powerful families from whom he had obtained land, and who thought of him as a corrupt "New English" official who had taken undue advantage of his position, where the Barrys, MacCarthys, O'Callaghans, and the Roches.

On the outbreak of the Rebellion in October, Perceval remained in Dublin, where, as clerk to the king's bench, he took a prominent part in drawing up the notorious list of three thousand indictments for high treason against the rebellious gentlemen. Further he was not without powerful allies in Ireland. James Butler, 12th Earl of Ormonde was an old acquaintance of Perceval's with mutual business associations that stretched back over the previous decade. At the outbreak of the Rebellion, their alliance remain firm. Ormonde commissioned Perceval first as captain of firelocks in his own regiment and then in March 1642, commissary-general of victuals for the king's army in Ireland. In the meantime, Perceval visited England during the winter months and defended Ormond, against accusations in Parliament that he was colluding with the Catholic rebels.

Perceval at length saw that, owing to the vacillation of the government, his own property in Munster would be left exposed to the rebel onslaught. He therefore garrisoned and provisioned his castles in this territory at his own expense. In the summer of 1642, a detachment of the confederate army under Lord Muskerry advanced into Perceval's districts. All his castles were taken, though Annagh and Liscarrol offered a stubborn resistance, the former holding out for eleven days against an attacking force of 7,500 men (20 August until 2 September 1642). Perceval now obtained the command of a corps of firelocks from the Duke of Ormonde. He armed them at his own cost, but does not seem to have taken any active part in the fighting, during the course of which his property in Munster was utterly ruined.

Perceval was one of those who urged and assented to the "cessation" of hostilities agreed on by the contending factions at Castle Martyn on 15 September 1643. In 1644 conferences were opened at Oxford, with a view to a definitive treaty, between representatives of the Irish confederates and certain royal commissioners. Perceval was appointed one of the latter, at the suggestion of his friend Lord-deputy Ormonde. King Charles I, who wished to use the Irish rebels against his English subjects, would have been willing to grant the former all their demands, including the toleration of Catholicism. Perceval, however, shrank from so extreme a step, which would have jeopardised his own prospects, and the conferences came to nothing. As a consequence, Perceval incurred the bitterest hostility of the royalist party. So strong was the feeling against him that he now resolved to go over to the English parliamentarian party. His overtures were favourably answered. He came to London in August 1644, was well received by the parliament, and obtained a seat in the English House of Commons as member for Newport in Cornwall.

From this time to his death Perceval remained in England. His Irish property had by now ceased to return any revenue; his losses by the war amounted on his own computation, probably an exaggeration, to the enormous sum of £248,004. 9s. 1d.; and he found himself compelled to sell the family estate of Burton in Somerset. His position in the English parliament, moreover, was by no means easy. Perceval had thrown in his lot with the moderate presbyterians. This party was at enmity with the independents; and in July 1647, after many minor attacks, a proposal was brought forward for Perceval's expulsion from the house, on the ground of his having supported the cessation of arms in 1643. He managed to retain his place by a brilliant defence. He subsequently took a share in organising the defence of London against the New Model Army. But in September 1647 he found himself compelled to retire into the country. Threats of impeachment being made, he returned to meet them in London; but was taken ill soon after his arrival, and died on 10 November 1647. He was buried, at the cost of the parliament, in the church of St. Martin-in-the-Fields. His funeral sermon was preached by Primate Ussher (a relation of his widow).

== Family ==
Philip Perceval was the son of Richard Perceval (1550–1620). Philip's son John, was created by patent a baronet of Ireland in 1661, with a clause, that the eldest son, or grandson, would become a baronet after the age of 21, and during the lifetime of the father or grandfather, as the case would be.

Perceval was married, on 26 October 1626, to Catharine, daughter of Arthur Usher. She died on 2 January 1681 and was buried in St. Audoen's Church, having borne her husband five sons and four daughters:

1. John Perceval
2. Richard (died 29 May 1638, buried St. Audoen's Church, unmarried)
3. William (30 May 1630 - 11 June 1633)
4. Arthur (7 September 1634 - January 1653, unmarried)
5. George (born 15 September 1635, drowned 25 March 1675, married Mary Crofton)
6. Judith (born 25 December 1627, married Randolph Clayton in February 1653)
7. Anne (born 13 September 1635, unmarried)
8. Dorcas (born 30 October 1636, married Jonah Wheeler)
9. Catherine (born 1640, unmarried)

The eldest son, Sir John Perceval regained most of the Irish estates, and was made a baronet on 12 August 1661. Sir John's sons, Sir Philip (1656 - 1680) and Sir John (1660 - 1686), succeeded him as 2nd and 3rd Baronets respectively, followed by the younger Sir John's sons, Sir Edward (1682 - 1691) and Sir John (1683–1748) as 4th and 5th Baronets. Sir John Perceval, 5th Baronet, became Baron of Burton, County Cork, in 1715; Viscount Perceval of Kanturk in 1722; and Earl of Egmont in 1733.

Spencer Perceval was the seventh son of the 2nd Earl Egmont and grandson of the 1st Earl Egmont. He was Prime Minister of the United Kingdom when he was assassinated by John Bellingham in the lobby of the House of Commons in 1812. Another member of the family Robert, the second son of the first baronet, had also been assassinated in 1677, by an unknown hand on The Strand in London.
