= John Perceval, 4th Earl of Egmont =

British peer and politician (1767–1835)

John Perceval, 4th Earl of Egmont (13 August 1767 – 31 December 1835), styled Viscount Perceval from 1770 to 1822, was a British peer and politician. He was unsuccessful in his attempt to enter the House of Commons in 1790, but entered the House of Lords when he succeeded to the Barony in February 1822.

== Early life ==
Lord Egmont was the only son of John Perceval, 3rd Earl of Egmont and his wife, Isabella Powlett. His father served as MP for Bridgwater from 1762 to 1768.

His paternal grandparents were John Perceval, 2nd Earl of Egmont and, his first wife, Lady Catherine Cecil (a daughter of the 5th Earl of Salisbury). After his grandmother died in 1752, his grandfather married Catherine Compton (sister of the 7th and 8th Earls of Northampton), with whom he had another three sons and six daughters. His maternal grandparents were Lord Nassau Powlett (son of the 2nd Duke of Bolton and Henrietta Crofts, herself a granddaughter of King Charles II) and Lady Isabella Tufton (a daughter of the 6th Earl of Thanet).

== Career ==
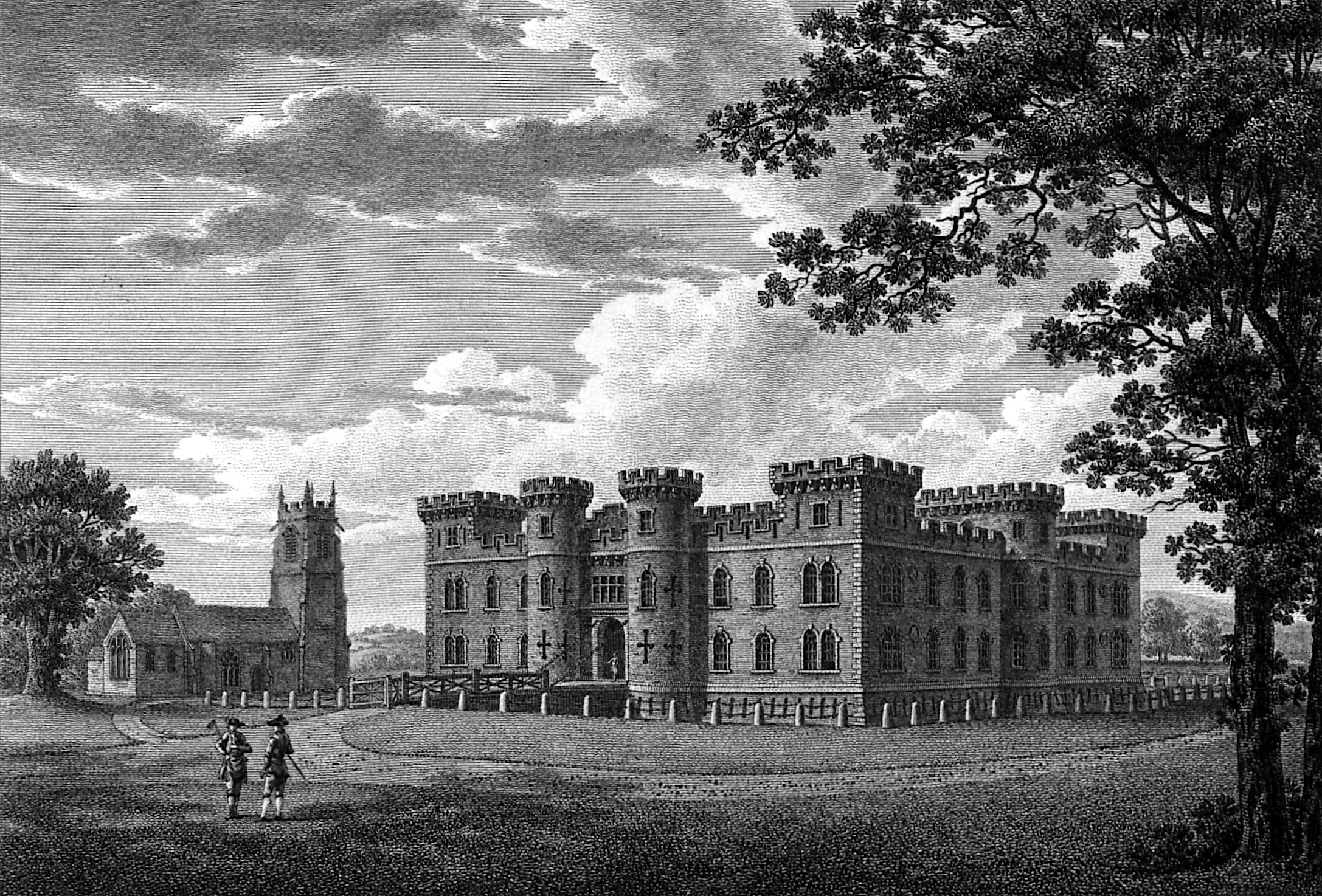
Enmore Castle, 1779

With the support of his father, he contested Bridgwater constituency, as Viscount Perceval, in the 1790 election in opposition to the Government. However, the interest of the 4th Earl Poulett carried the day, returning the Earl's brother Vere Poulett and John Langston with 186 and 161 votes, respectively, while Lord Perceval only drew 87.

Lord Perceval succeeded his father as Earl of Egmont in 1822. As his father also held the British peerage of Baron Lovel and Holland, he entered the British House of Lords. He inherited the family seat, Enmore Castle, in Enmore, Somerset. In 1833, he was forced to sell the castle to Nicholas Broadmead to pay off debts. Broadmead, a solicitor with shares in the Parrett Navigation Company and the Ivelchester and Langport Navigation, demolished a large portion of the building the following year, converting the remaining parts of the building into a three-storey house.

== Personal life ==
On 10 March 1792, the then Viscount Perceval married Bridget Wynn, daughter of Lt.-Col. Glyn Wynn, MP for Caernarfon, and Bridget Pugh (a daughter of Edward Philip Pugh of Penrhyn-Creuddyn). His father disapproved of the marriage, and did not attempt to put him up as a candidate again. They had one son:

- Henry Frederick Joseph James Perceval, 5th Earl of Egmont (1796–1841), who was briefly MP for East Looe in 1826; he married Louisa Maria d'Orselet, the daughter of Comte d'Orselet in 1828.

His wife Bridget, Countess of Egmont, died on 24 January 1826 and he, Lord Egmont, died on 31 December 1835 and was succeeded by his son, Henry.

Peerage of Ireland
Preceded by John Perceval	Earl of Egmont; 1822–1835	Succeeded by Henry Perceval
