= John Percival (TV producer) =

- Born: 25 May 1937; London, England
- Died: 6 February 2005 (aged 67); London, England
- Education: Bedford School; Sidney Sussex College, Cambridge, at the University of Cambridge
- Occupations: Television producer Documentary maker

John Percival (25 May 1937 – 6 February 2005) was a British television producer and documentary-maker.

== Biography ==
Percival was born in London on 25 May 1937. He was educated at Bedford School, and read Archaeology and Anthropology at Sidney Sussex College, Cambridge.

Percival was one of the first reporter-producers of the BBC's Man Alive programme in 1965 - the first documentary series to report on social issues by interviewing 'real people' rather than experts. This was followed by his anthropological series The Family of Man (1969), which compared life in the Home Counties with that of tribespeople in New Guinea and Africa, and Rich Man Poor Man (1972), exploring the consequences of globalisation.

In 1978, he produced Living in the Past, a BBC fly-on-the-wall documentary programme which followed a group of 15 young volunteers (six couples and three children) sustaining themselves for a year, equipped only with the tools, crops and livestock that would have been available in Britain in the 2nd century BC.

In 1980, Percival made the acclaimed series Africa, with the historian Basil Davidson, for Channel 4. This was followed by The Great Famine, Living Islam and All Our Children. He also focused on horticulture as series producer of Gardeners' World and Channel 4's Real Gardens.

Percival was the author of three books on the documentary subjects of his programmes, Living in the Past (1980), For Valour (a history of the Victoria Cross, 1985) and The Great Famine: Ireland's Potato Famine, 1845-1851 (1995).

== Personal life ==
Percival and his first wife, the TV presenter and author Jacky Gillott, had two sons; she killed herself in 1980. He married his second wife, Lalage, in 1984, and they had a daughter. He contracted cancer and died in London on 6 February 2005.
