= John Perceval, 3rd Earl of Egmont =

British politician (c. 1737–1822)

The Right Honourable The Earl of Egmont

Member of Parliament for Bridgwater
- In office 1762–1768 Serving with Edward Southwell, The Lord Coleraine, Benjamin Allen
- Preceded by: The Earl of Egmont; Edward Southwell
- Succeeded by: Hon. Anne Poulett; Benjamin Allen

Personal details
- Born: John James Perceval; 29 January 1737
- Died: 25 February 1822 (aged 85)
- Spouse: Isabella Powlett (m. 1765; died 1821)
- Children: John Perceval, 4th Earl of Egmont
- Parent(s): John Perceval, 2nd Earl of Egmont; Lady Catherine Cecil

John James Perceval, 3rd Earl of Egmont (29 January 1737/38 – 25 February 1822), styled Viscount Perceval from 1748 to 1770, was a British politician.

== Early life ==
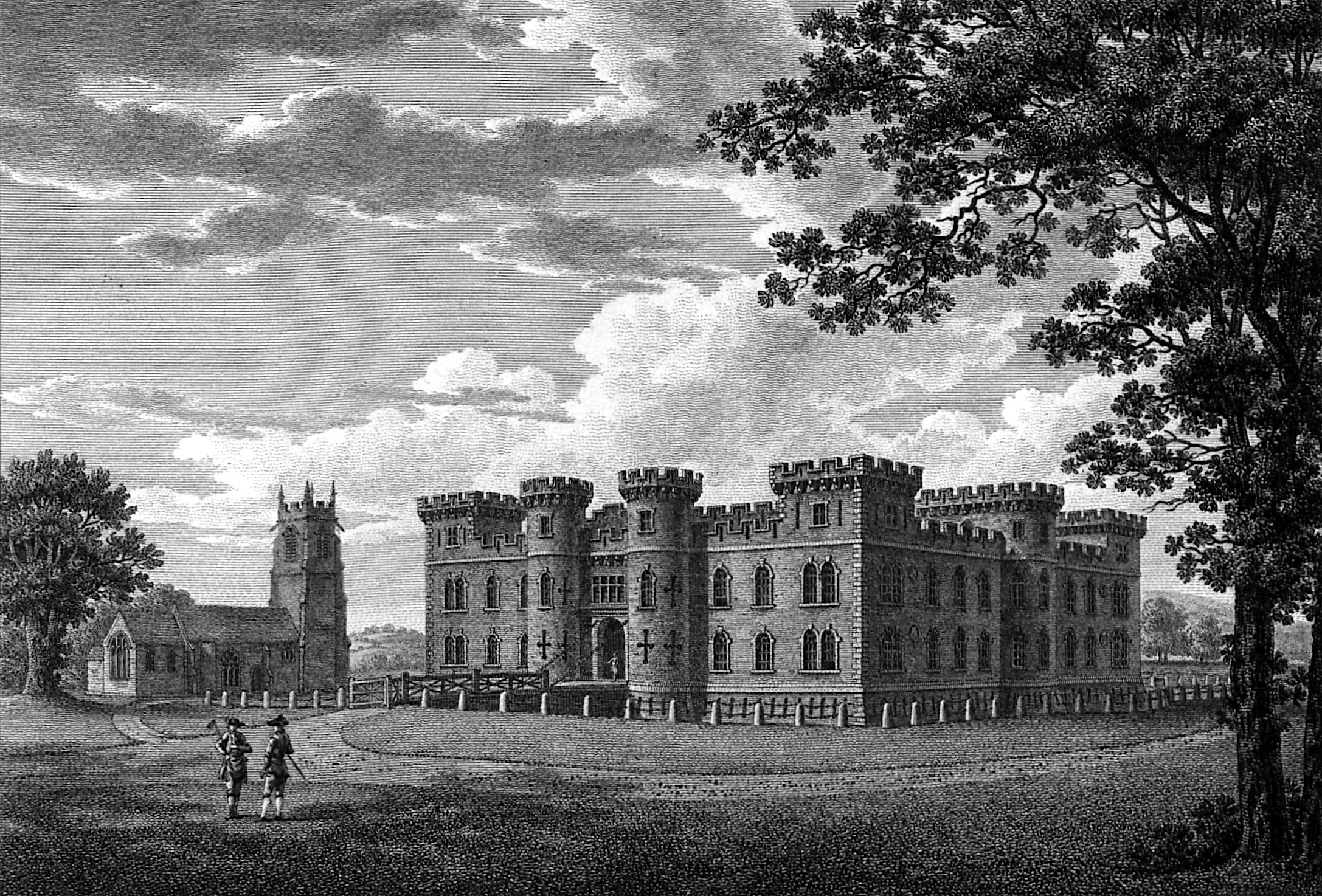
Enmore Castle, 1779

He was the eldest son of John Perceval, 2nd Earl of Egmont and, his first wife, Lady Catherine Cecil, and half-brother of Spencer Perceval. From his parents' marriage, he had a number of younger siblings, including Hon. Cecil Parker Perceval (who died while at Eton), Hon. Philip Tufton Perceval (a captain in the Royal Navy), Hon. Edward Perceval (a captain in the Royal Dragoon Guards, who married Sarah Howarth), and Hon. Catherine Perceval (wife of Thomas Wynn, 1st Baron Newborough). After his mother died in 1752, his father married Catherine Compton (sister of the 7th and 8th Earls of Northampton), with whom he had another three sons and six daughters.

His paternal grandparents were John Perceval, 1st Earl of Egmont and the former Catherine Parker (a daughter of Sir Philip Parker, 2nd Baronet). His maternal grandparents were James Cecil, 5th Earl of Salisbury and the former Lady Anne Tufton (a daughter of 6th Earl of Thanet).

== Career ==
Perceval served as Member of Parliament for Bridgwater from 1762 to 1768. Perceval was also initially declared re-elected in 1768, but on petition, he was judged not to have been duly elected and his opponent, Anne Poulett, was seated in his place. During his period in office, Perceval served in William Pitt the Younger's government.

On 4 December 1770, he succeeded his father as Earl of Egmont and, as his father also held the British peerage of Baron Lovel and Holland, entered the British House of Lords. His father had rebuilt Enmore Castle in Somerset.

== Personal life ==
On 4 June 1765, he married Isabella Powlett (d. 1821), daughter of Lord Nassau Powlett (son of the 2nd Duke of Bolton and Henrietta Crofts, herself a granddaughter of King Charles II) and Lady Isabella Tufton (a daughter of the 6th Earl of Thanet). They had one son:

- John Perceval, 4th Earl of Egmont (1767–1835), who married Bridget Wynn, daughter of Lt.-Col. Glynn Wynn, MP for Caernarfon, and Bridget Pugh (a daughter of Edward Philip Pugh of Penrhyn-Creuddyn), in 1792.

Lord Egmont died on 25 February 1822 and was succeeded in his titles by his only son, John.

A journal of the earl, compiled by George Wymberley Jones De Renne and edited by Charles Colcock Jones Jr., was published in 1886.

=== Descendants ===
Through his only son John, he was a grandfather of Henry Frederick John James Perceval, 5th Earl of Egmont, who died without issue in 1841 after which the titles passed to other descendants of the 2nd Earl.

Parliament of Great Britain
Preceded by The Earl of Egmont; Edward Southwell	Member of Parliament for Bridgwater; 1762–1768; With: Edward Southwell 1762–1763; The Lord Coleraine 1763–1768; Benjamin Allen 1788–1789	Succeeded by Hon. Anne Poulett; Benjamin Allen
Peerage of Ireland
Preceded by John Perceval	Earl of Egmont; 1770–1822	Succeeded by John Perceval
