= Richard Percivale =

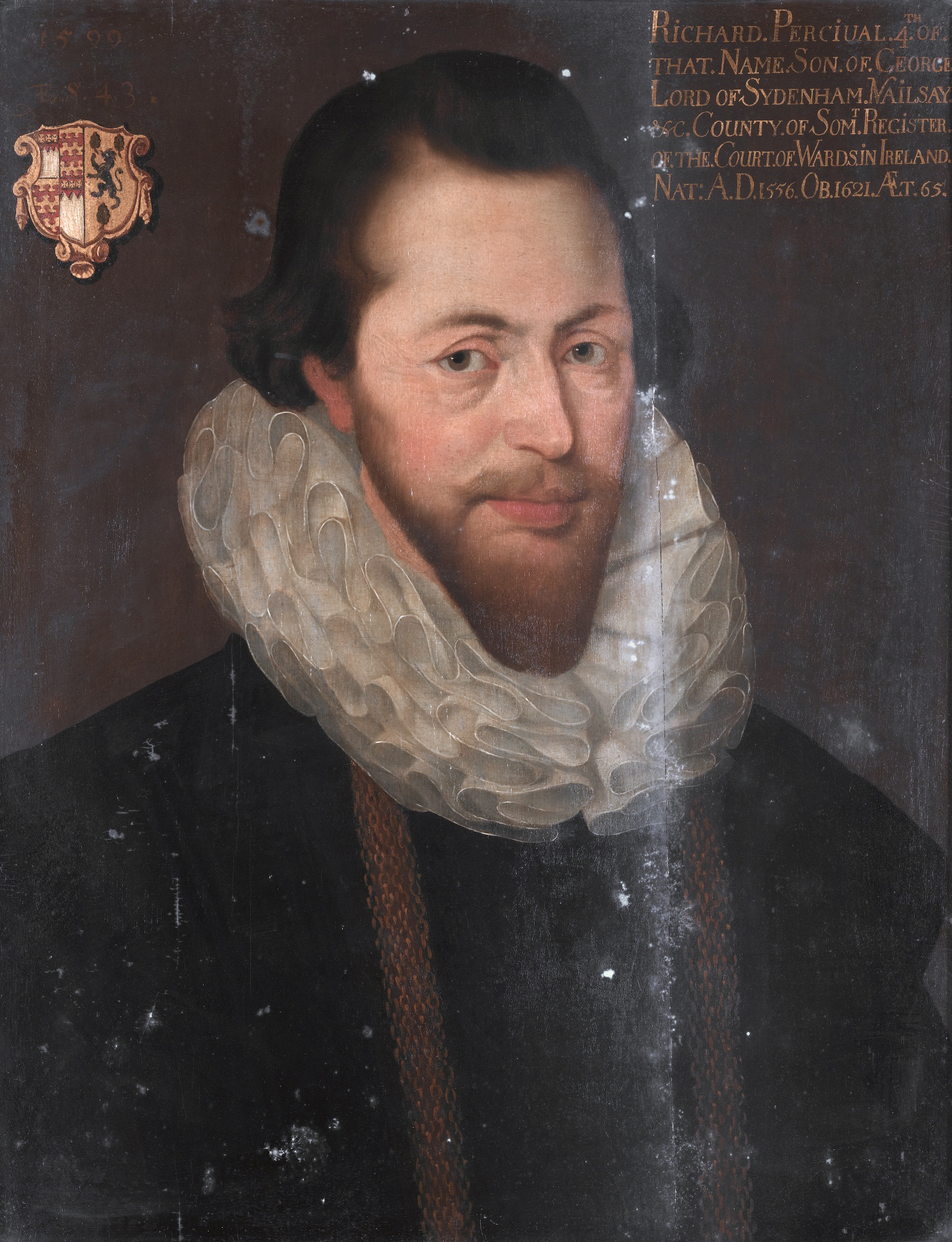
Richard Perceval (1556-1621), of Twickenham, Somerset (manner of Marcus Gheeraerts the Younger). Inscribed: Richard Percival, 4th of that name, son of George lord of Sydenham, Nailsay, etc, County of Som(erse)t...

Arms of Richard Percivale: Quarterly 1st & 4th: Argent, on a chief indented gules three crosses patée of the field (Perceval); 2nd & 3rd: Barry nebulée of six or and gules (Lovel)

Sir Richard Percivale (alias Perceval etc.) (1550 – 4 September 1620) of Sydenham, near Bridgwater, Somerset, was an English administrator and politician, also known as a Hispanist and lexicographer. He wrote a Spanish grammar for English readers, A Spanish Grammar, and a dictionary, both included in his Bibliotheca Hispanica (1591); this work was later enlarged by John Minsheu in A dictionarie in Spanish and English (London: Edmund Bollifant, 1599; London: printed by John Haviland for various booksellers, including William Aspley, Matthew Lownes, and George Latham, 1623).

== Origins ==
He was the eldest son and heir of George Perceval (c. 1532–1601) (alias Percival, etc.) of Sydenham, near Bridgwater, Somerset, by his wife Elizabeth Bampfylde, a daughter of Sir Edward Bampfylde (d.1528) of Poltimore, Devon and Elizabeth Wadham. His family had inherited the manor of Sydenham by marriage to the heiress of the prominent Westcountry Sydenham family, which had originated there, junior branches of which were seated in Somerset at Combe Sydenham, Orchard Sydenham, Brympton D'Evercy (later Sydenham baronets) and elsewhere.

He was born at Nailsea Court.

== Career ==
He was educated at St Paul's School, London. As a law student at Lincoln's Inn, he alienated his father by extravagance, and by marrying Joan Young, seventh daughter of Henry Young of Buckhorn Weston in Dorset who brought him no fortune.

Perceval went to Spain, and lived there for four years till his wife's death; he then returned to England, and vainly sought reconciliation with his father. Through his friend Roger Cave of Stamford, who had married Lord Burghley's sister Margaret, he was introduced to the lord treasurer. The queen rewarded him with a pension, and later with a place in the Duchy of Lancaster; and Burghley, when his son Robert Cecil became master of the court of wards, made him "secretary" of the court.

Success won back for Perceval his father's favour, and he inherited a substantial income from property. At the end of the queen's reign, he was sent to Ireland to see if the court of wards could be extended there with profit to the crown; but his report was unfavourable. In 1603–4 he sat in parliament for Richmond in Yorkshire, and took some part in commercial matters of trade and revenue, and in the business of the union with Scotland.

In 1610, on Sir William Fleetwood's disgrace as receiver-general of the court of wards, the office was vested in commissioners, of whom Perceval was one. On the death of his patron Cecil, earl of Salisbury, on 24 May 1612, Perceval lost all his posts in England; but on a new settlement of the court of wards being projected in Ireland, he was made registrar or clerk of the court in 1616. He now sold a major part of his patrimony, and invested in purchases and mortgages in County Cork. In 1618 he returned to England to secure his appointment against the claims of a competitor, and, though obliged to resign part of his salary, he saved his post and obtained a discharge of all his debts to the crown.

In 1609 Perceval was on the list of members of the Virginia Company, incorporated on 23 May of that year, and in 1610 he was a donor to the supply of the plantation begun in Virginia.

== Marriages and children ==
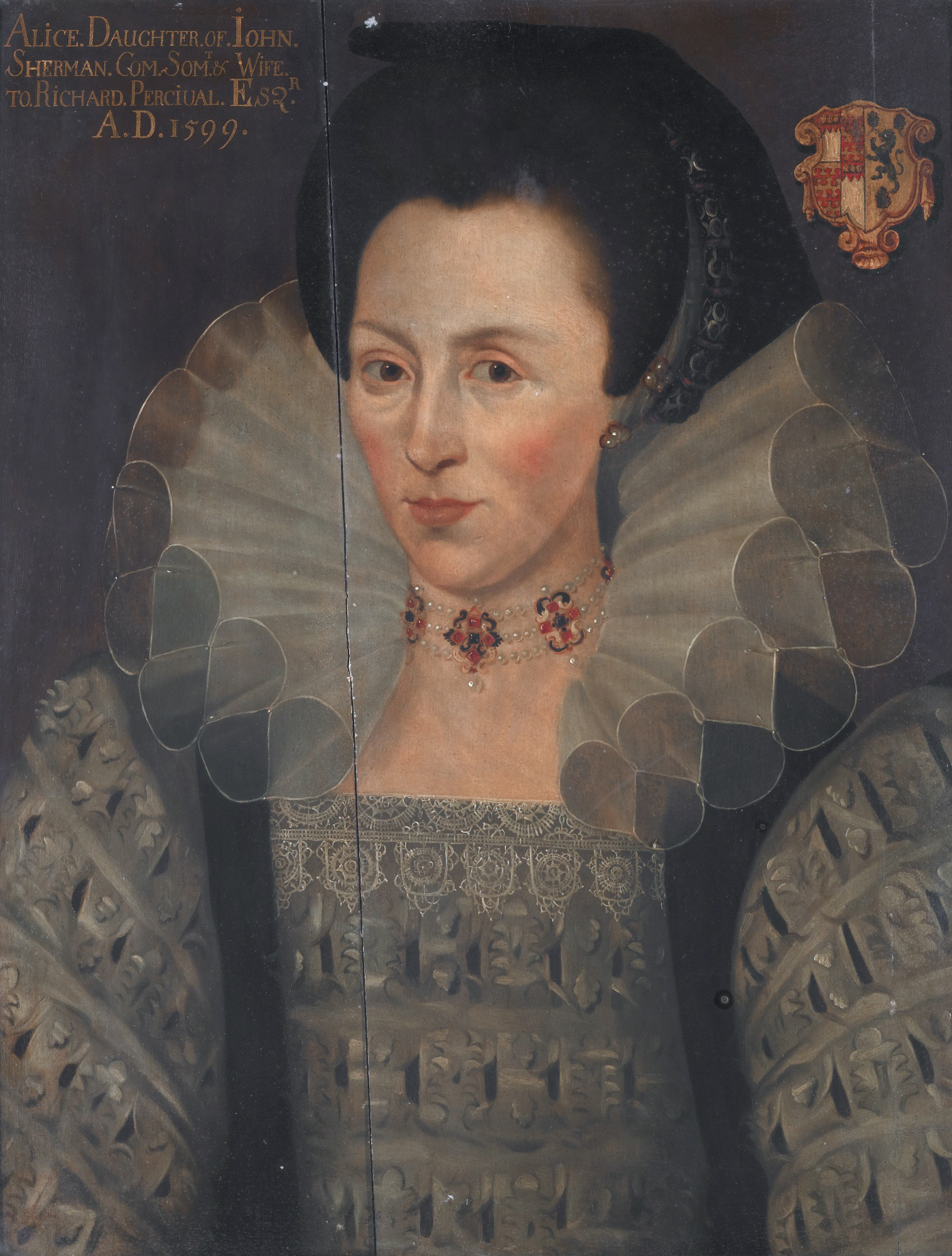
Alice Sherman, portrait in manner of Marcus Gheeraerts the Younger, 1599)

He married twice:

- Firstly to a lady of unrecorded name, by whom he had three sons and two daughters;
- Secondly to Alice Sherman, a daughter of John Sherman of Somerset, by whom he had two sons and two daughters including:
  - Sir Philip Perceval, younger son and heir, ancestor of the Earls of Egmont. The History of the House of Yvery (1742) by James Anderson and another, commissioned by John Perceval, 1st Earl of Egmont, contains unreliable detail.

== Death and burial ==
Perceval died in Dublin on 4 September 1620, in his sixty-ninth year, and was buried in St. Audoen's Church.

== Works ==
Richard Perceval was the author (spelt Richard Percyvall) of the Spanish-English dictionary, Bibliotheca Hispanica, containing a Grammar with a Dictionarie in Spanish, English, and Latin, London, 1591. It is dedicated to Robert Devereux, 2nd Earl of Essex. Much of the preliminary work was done by Dr Thomas D'Oylie, a physician at St Bartholomew's Hospital, and himself an accomplished linguist in Spanish. A second edition, edited and enlarged by John Minsheu, appeared in 1599 under the title A Dictionarie in Spanish and English; this edition appeared in two parts, one containing the dictionary and the other the grammar. A third edition appeared in 1623.
