= John Percival (cricketer) =

English cricketer

Personal information
- Full name: John Douglas Percival
- Born: 5 August 1902; Kensington, London
- Died: 5 March 1983 (aged 80); Roehampton, London
- Batting: Right-handed

Domestic team information
- Years: Team
- 1922–1923: Gloucestershire
- 1922–1923: Oxford University

Career statistics
Competition	First-class
Matches	3
Runs scored	38
Batting average	6.33
100s/50s	0/0
Top score	17
Catches/stumpings	0/0
- Source: CricInfo, 8 October 2022

John Douglas Percival (5 August 1902 – 5 March 1983) was an English cricketer who featured as a right-hand batsman in three first-class cricket matches between 1922 and 1923; one match saw him represent Gloucestershire, in the other two he batted for Oxford University. Outside of first-class cricket, he represented numerous clubs and teams including Radley College and Westminster School while a student there, and played for the Marylebone Cricket Club in 1930. During the Second World War he played for the Royal Army Service Corps. Born in Kensington, he died in Roehampton.

== Playing career ==
=== Early matches ===
Percival's earliest recorded matches took place in June 1918, where he batted for Radley College. He played twice for the college that month, scoring four in the first game against Westminster School but remaining unbeaten on 63 in the second against Bradfield College. A year later, in May 1919, he was playing for Westminster School against various other schools in England. He scored 62 against the Household Brigade that month, and over the next year played against various schools across England. In June 1919 he scored 78 against Tonbridge School, and in July 1920 he hit 56 while opening the batting against Charterhouse School.

On 2 August 1920, he represented 'The Rest' at a match at Lord's against a Lord's School XI. The game, which lasted over two days, saw Percival score 23 and 32 opening the batting. The match was a rain-affected draw, with Lord's School being largely dismantled by a nine-wicket haul for Edward Hewetson. Percival played a combined British Army XI at Lord's the next day, but only scored zero and seven.

The following summer Percival began in May with 86 against Sherborne School, followed by 58 against Charterhouse on 9 July. On 1 August he again revisited Lord's to face Lord's Schools but could only score three and seven.

=== Oxford ===
In 1922 Percival left Westminster School and entered The Queen's College, Oxford. His first match for the university was his first-class debut, and came on 10 May at the university's cricket ground, where he opened the batting against Hampshire. He scored one and 17 – the latter his career best – as Oxford were defeated by 139 runs. Ten days later on 20 May he played against the Free Foresters Cricket Club at Oxford, scoring ten and zero. He played one more first-class match on 23 May 1923, this time representing Gloucestershire against Oxford. He scored zero in the first innings, and made ten in the second. He scored only 38 runs from his three first-class matches in total, at a batting average of only 6.33.

=== Later cricket ===
Percival settled in Kenya in the later half of the 1920s. In October 1928 he played a 'Officials v Settlers' match in Nairobi, where he represented the Settlers, scoring nine and 21. The sides played again eleven months later, with Percival making four and 33. He then returned to England and was invited to play for the Marylebone Cricket Club at Lord's against 'Indian Gymkhana' on 25 July 1930. However, he was not required to bat. Due to his time in Kenya, he opened the batting for the Kenya Kongonis Cricket Club – a Nairobi cricket club – during their tour of England in 1931, playing in three matches. On the outbreak of the Second World War he represented the Royal Army Service Corps against a team from Aldershot barracks, and he ended his playing days after the war with matches played for 'The Forty Club' at Royal Military Academy Sandhurst through the 1950s.
