= Earl of Egmont =

Title in the peerage of Ireland

Earldom of Egmont
- Argent, on a chief indented gules three crosses patée of the field
- Creation date: 6 November 1733
- Created by: George II
- Peerage: Peerage of Ireland
- First holder: John Perceval
- Last holder: Thomas Gerald, 12th Earl of Egmont
- Remainder to: Heirs male of the 1st Earl's body lawfully begotten
- Subsidiary titles: Viscount Perceval; Baron Perceval; Baron Lovel and Holland (GB); Baron Arden (I)
- Status: Extinct
- Extinction date: 6 November 2011
- Motto: Sub cruce candida ("Under the white cross")

Earl of Egmont was a title in the Peerage of Ireland, created in 1733 for John Perceval, 1st Viscount Perceval. It became extinct with the death of the twelfth earl in 2011.

== History ==
The Percevals claimed descent from an ancient Anglo-Norman family, a branch of the House of Yvery. This branch of the family traces its lineage to David Perceval, Lord of Tykenham, Rolleston, Sydenham, Moreland, Weley, and Wolmerton in Somerset, in the 16th century. His grandson, Sir Richard Percivale (1550–1620), agent of William Cecil, 1st Baron Burghley, deciphered coded letters that gave Queen Elizabeth I the first intelligence of the Spanish Armada of 1588. Richard Percivale served as Secretary of the Court of Wards and Registrar of the Court of Wards in Ireland, where he acquired large estates.

Sir Richard's son, Sir Philip Perceval (1605–1647), obtained grants of forfeited lands in Ireland to the amount of 101,000 statute acres. On 9 September 1661 his eldest son, John Perceval, was created a Baronet, of Kanturk in the County of Cork, in the Baronetage of Ireland. The baronetcy was created by patent with a clause specifying that the eldest son, or grandson, would become a baronet after the age of 21, and during the lifetime of the father or grandfather, as the case would be.

Robert (1657–1677), second son of the first baronet, was assassinated in 1677 by an unknown hand, in the Strand, London. The first baronet was succeeded by his eldest son, the second Baronet, who died unmarried at an early age and was succeeded by his younger brother, the third Baronet. He also died at an early age and was succeeded by his eldest son, the fourth Baronet. He died at the age of nine and the titles were inherited by his younger brother, the fifth Baronet, John Perceval (1683-1748). He represented County Cork in the Irish House of Commons and Harwich in the British House of Commons; he also served as the first President of the trustees of the Georgia colony. Perceval was created Baron Perceval, of Burton in the County of Cork, in 1715, with remainder to the heirs male of his father, and Viscount Perceval, of Kanturk in the County of Cork, in 1722, and Earl of Egmont in 1733, with remainder to the heirs male of his body. All three titles were in the Peerage of Ireland. Perceval claimed descent from the Egmonts of Holland but the title of the earldom was taken from a place in County Cork where the family owned an estate.

His son John Perceval, 2nd Earl of Egmont (1711-1770), became a prominent politician and notably served as First Lord of the Admiralty from 1763 to 1766. In 1762 he was created Baron Lovel and Holland, of Enmore in the County of Somerset, in the Peerage of Great Britain, which gave him an automatic seat in the British House of Lords. (The second Earl's seventh son (second son from his second marriage), Spencer Perceval, served as Prime Minister of the United Kingdom from 1809, but was assassinated by John Bellingham in the lobby of the House of Commons in 1812).

Lord Egmont was succeeded by his eldest son, the third Earl, who sat as a member of parliament for Bridgwater. His grandson, the fifth Earl, briefly represented East Looe in the House of Commons. He was succeeded by his cousin, the sixth Earl, who had already succeeded his father as third Baron Arden (see below). He was Member of Parliament for West Surrey. On his death, the titles passed to his nephew, the seventh Earl. He was the son of Charles George Perceval, fourth son of the second Baron Arden. He represented Midhurst in Parliament as a Conservative. He was succeeded by his first cousin once removed, the eighth Earl. He was the grandson of Arthur Philip Perceval, sixth son of the second Baron Arden. On the death in 1929 of his younger brother, the ninth Earl, this line of the family also failed and the titles became dormant.

They were claimed by the late Earl's third cousin Frederick Joseph Trevelyan Perceval, who lived in Canada. He was the grandson of Frederick James Perceval, second son of Prime Minister Spencer Perceval, seventh son of the second Earl. He died in 1932 before he had established his claim. However, in 1939 the House of Lords allowed the claim of his only son Frederick George Moore Perceval, who became the eleventh Earl (his father having posthumously been deemed the tenth Earl). The eleventh Earl moved back to Alberta, Canada, and became a farmer. At his death in 2001, the eleventh Earl was succeeded in the earldom by his eldest and sole surviving son Thomas Frederick Gerald Perceval.

The twelfth Earl never married, and upon his death on 6 November 2011 the earldom and all of its subsidiary titles became extinct.

The title of Baroness Arden, of Lohort Castle in the County of Cork, was created in the Peerage of Ireland in 1770 for Catherine Perceval, Countess of Egmont, second wife of the second Earl of Egmont. She was the daughter of Charles Compton, younger son of George Compton, 4th Earl of Northampton. Lady Arden was succeeded by her eldest son, the second Baron. He represented Launceston, Warwick and Totnes in Parliament and served as Master of the Mint from 1801 to 1802. In the latter year he was created Baron Arden, of Arden in the County of Warwick, in the Peerage of the United Kingdom. He was succeeded by his eldest son, the third Baron, who in 1841 succeeded his cousin as sixth Earl of Egmont.

Mount Taranaki in New Zealand was named after the second Earl of Egmont by James Cook.

== Perceval Baronets, of Kanturk (1661) ==
- Sir John Perceval, 1st Baronet (1629–1665) – created 9 September 1661.
- Sir Philip Perceval, 2nd Baronet (1656–1680)
- Sir John Perceval, 3rd Baronet (1660–1686)
- Sir Edward Perceval, 4th Baronet (1682–1691)
- Sir John Perceval, 5th Baronet (1683–1748) (created Earl of Egmont in 1733)

== Earls of Egmont (1733) ==
- John Perceval, 1st Earl of Egmont (1683–1748)
- John Perceval, 2nd Earl of Egmont (1711–1770)
- John James Perceval, 3rd Earl of Egmont (1738–1822)
- John Perceval, 4th Earl of Egmont (1767–1835)
- Henry Frederick Joseph James Perceval, 5th Earl of Egmont (1796–1841)
- George James Perceval, 6th Earl of Egmont (1794–1874)
- Charles George Perceval, 7th Earl of Egmont (1845–1897)
- Augustus Arthur Perceval, 8th Earl of Egmont (1856–1910)
- Charles John Perceval, 9th Earl of Egmont (1858–1929) (dormant)
- Frederick Joseph Trevelyan Perceval, de jure 10th Earl of Egmont (1873–1932)
- Frederick George Moore Perceval, 11th Earl of Egmont (1914–2001) (claim admitted 1939)
- Thomas Frederick Gerald Perceval, 12th Earl of Egmont (1934–2011)

== Barons Arden (1770) ==
- Catherine Perceval, Countess of Egmont, 1st Baroness Arden (died 1784) (in the Peerage of Ireland)
- Charles George Perceval, 2nd Baron Arden (1756–1840) (created Baron Arden in the Peerage of the United Kingdom in 1802)
- George James Perceval, 6th Earl of Egmont, 3rd Baron Arden (1794–1874) (succeeded as Earl of Egmont in 1841)

see above for further holders

== Line of succession ==
- John Perceval, 1st Earl of Egmont (1683–1748)
  - John Perceval, 2nd Earl of Egmont (1711–1770)
    - John Perceval, 3rd Earl of Egmont (1738–1822)
      - John Perceval, 4th Earl of Egmont (1767–1835)
        - Henry Perceval, 5th Earl of Egmont (1796–1841)
    - Charles Perceval, 2nd Baron Arden (1756–1840)
      - George Perceval, 6th Earl of Egmont (1794–1874)
      - Charles Perceval (1796–1858)
        - Charles Perceval, 7th Earl of Egmont (1845–1897)
      - Arthur Perceval (1799–1853)
        - Charles Perceval (1831–1894)
          - Augustus Perceval, 8th Earl of Egmont (1856–1910)
          - Charles Perceval, 9th Earl of Egmont (1858–1929)
    - Spencer Perceval (1762–1812)
      - Frederick James Perceval (1797–1861)
        - George Perceval (1847–1920)
          - Frederick Perceval, 10th Earl of Egmont (1873–1932)
            - Frederick Perceval, 11th Earl of Egmont (1914–2001)
              - Thomas Frederick Gerald Perceval, 12th Earl of Egmont (1934–2011)

== Family seats ==
The family seats were as in the names of the territorial designations. Other major homes funded or expanded by the family included:

- Great Burgh, Epsom Downs/Tattenham Corner, Surrey, England
- Cowdray Park, Sussex. Sold with its 600-acre estate in 1909.
- Avon Castle, Ringwood, Hampshire; purchased in 1912, and sold with its 1,200-acre estate in 1938.

== See also ==
- Spencer Perceval
