= Jane Perceval =

Spouse of the British Prime Minister

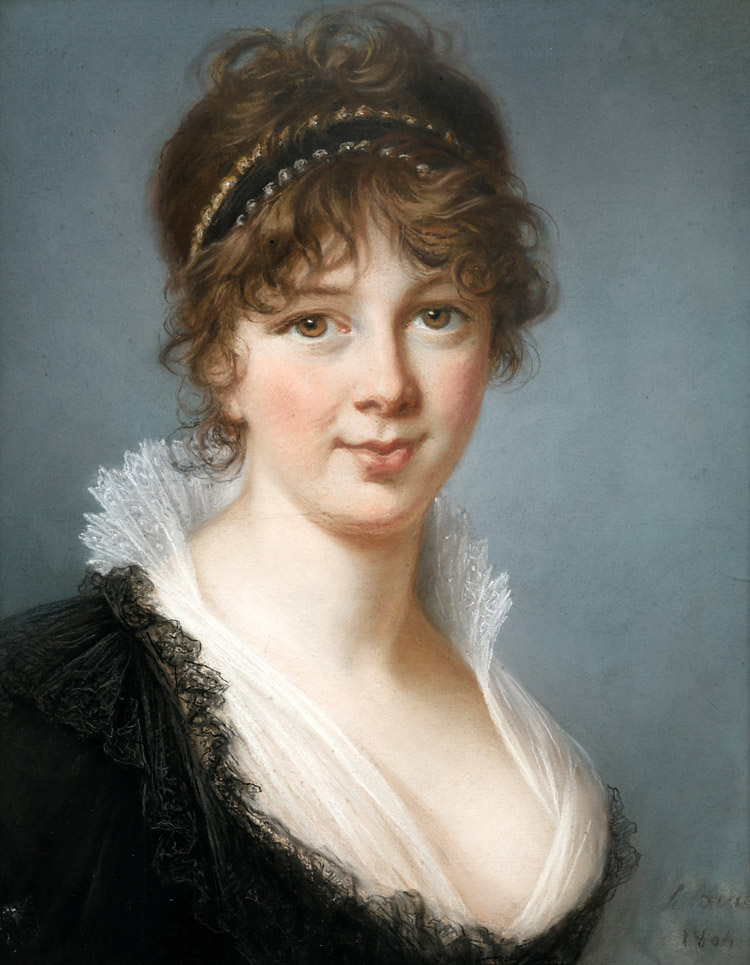
Jane Perceval by Vigée Le Brun, 1804

Jane Perceval (née Wilson; 1769–1844), later known as "Lady Carr" after her second marriage, was the wife of Spencer Perceval, Prime Minister of the United Kingdom between 1809 and 1812, until his assassination.

== Early life ==
Jane was the daughter of Sir Thomas Spencer Wilson, a British Army officer and politician, and his wife Jane (née Weller). She had one brother and two sisters. One of her sisters, Margaretta, married Charles Perceval, 2nd Baron Arden. It was during their courtship that she met Lord Arden's younger brother Spencer Perceval who was living with his brother in a rented house in Charlton. Each of the brothers fell in love with one of the sisters.

Where Sir Thomas approved of the match between Margaretta and the wealthy and successful Lord Arden, he disapproved of the match between Jane and Spencer who was an impecunious barrister on the Midland Circuit. After being told to wait until Jane came of age, Sir Thomas still opposed the marriage as Perceval's career was still not prospering.

== Marriage to Spencer Perceval ==
With her father not approving, the couple decided to elope. They married by special licence in East Grinstead. They set up home together in lodgings over a carpet shop in Bedford Row, later moving to Lindsey House, Lincoln's Inn Fields. The fees from his legal practice eventually allowed Perceval to take out a lease on a country house, Belsize House in Hampstead.

Jane and Spencer had 13 children together, of whom 12 survived to adulthood:

1. Jane (1791–1824) married her cousin Edward Perceval, son of Lord Arden, in 1821 and lived in Felpham, Sussex. She died three years after marrying, apparently in childbirth.
2. Frances (1792–1877) lived with three unmarried sisters.
3. Maria (1794–1877) lived with her three unmarried sisters.
4. Spencer (1795–1859) was, like his father, educated at Harrow and Trinity College, Cambridge. After Perceval's assassination, Spencer junior was voted an annuity of £1000 (equivalent to £84,000 in 2023), free legal training at Lincoln's Inn and a tellership of the Exchequer, all of which left him financially secure. He became a Member of Parliament at the age of 22 and in 1821 married Anna, a daughter of the chief of the clan Macleod, with whom he had eleven children. He joined the Catholic Apostolic Church and was created an apostle in 1833. He served as a metropolitan lunacy commissioner.
5. Charles (born and died 1796)
6. Frederick James (1797–1861) was the only one of Perceval's sons not to go to Harrow. Due to his fragile health he was sent to school at Rottingdean. He married for the first time in 1827, spent some time in Ghent, Belgium, was a director of the Clerical, Medical and General Life Assurance Society and a justice of the peace for Middlesex and for Kent, but generally led a quiet and retired life. Widowed in 1843, he married for the second time the following year. A grandson, Frederick Joseph Trevelyan Perceval, who was a Canadian rancher, became the 10th de jure Earl of Egmont (he did not claim the title) and was the father of the 11th earl.
7. Rev. Henry (1799–1885) was educated at Harrow, where he was the only Perceval to become head of school. He went to Brasenose College, Oxford. In 1826 he married his cousin Catherine Drummond. For 46 years Henry was the rector of Elmley Lovett in Worcestershire.
8. Dudley Montague (1800–1856) was educated at Harrow and Christ Church, Oxford. Like his brother Spencer, he was given free legal training at Lincoln's Inn but was not called to the bar. He spent two years as an administrator at the Cape of Good Hope, where he married a daughter of Gen. Sir Richard Bourke, future Governor of New South Wales, in 1827. Back in England he obtained a treasury post and defended his father's reputation after it was attacked in Napier's history of the Peninsular War. In 1853 he stood unsuccessfully against William Gladstone in the election for an MP to represent Oxford University.
9. Isabella (1801–1886) married her cousin Spencer Horatio Walpole in 1835 and was the only one of Perceval's daughters to have children. Her husband was a lawyer who became an MP in 1846 and served as Home Secretary. They lived in the Hall on Ealing Green, next-door to Isabella's four unmarried sisters.
10. John Thomas (1803–1876) was educated at Harrow. After a three-year career as an officer in the Grenadier Guards and a term at Oxford University, he spent three years in asylums and became a campaigner for reform of the Lunacy Laws. In 1832, just after his release from an asylum, he married a cheesemonger's daughter.
11. Louisa (1804–1891) lived with her three unmarried sisters.
12. Frederica (1805–1900) lived with her three unmarried sisters. In her will she left money to build All Saints Church, Ealing, in memory of her father (he was born on All Saints Day). It is also known as the Spencer Perceval Memorial Church.
13. Ernest Augustus (1807–1896) was educated at Harrow. He spent nine years in the 15th Hussars, seven of them as a captain. In 1830, he married his cousin Beatrice Trevelyan, daughter of Sir John Trevelyan, 5th Baronet. The couple settled in Somerset and raised a large family, including antiquary Spencer George Perceval. Ernest served as private secretary to the Home Office on three occasions.

After Jane became ill after the birth of her final child, the family moved out of the damp and draughty Belsize House, spending a few months in Lord Teignmouth's house in Clapham before moving to Elm Grove, a 16th-century house in Ealing which had been the home of the Bishop of Durham; Perceval paid £7,500 for it in 1808 (borrowing from his brother Lord Arden and the trustees of Jane's dowry), and the Perceval family's long association with Ealing began.

Jane was widowed on 11 May 1812, when a man named John Bellingham shot Perceval in the chest in the lobby of the House of Commons. He died a few minutes later, just as a surgeon arrived at the scene. After rumours that her husband had not left his widow and 12 children well provided for – he had around £106 (roughly £9,000 today) in the bank at the time of his death – Parliament voted to settle £50,000 on Perceval's children, with additional annuities for his widow and eldest son, a few days after his death.

== Later life and death ==
Three years after Spencer Perceval's assassination, Jane remarried to Lieutenant-Colonel Sir Henry William Carr, brother of the Reverend Robert James Carr, then vicar of Brighton. She would be widowed again six years later.

Jane died in 1844, aged 74. At the time of her death, she was living with her four unmarried daughters in Elm Grove. She was buried next to her first husband in the Egmont vault at St Luke's Church, Charlton, London.
