= Spencer Perceval =

Prime Minister of the United Kingdom from 1809 to 1812

The Right Honourable Spencer Perceval KC
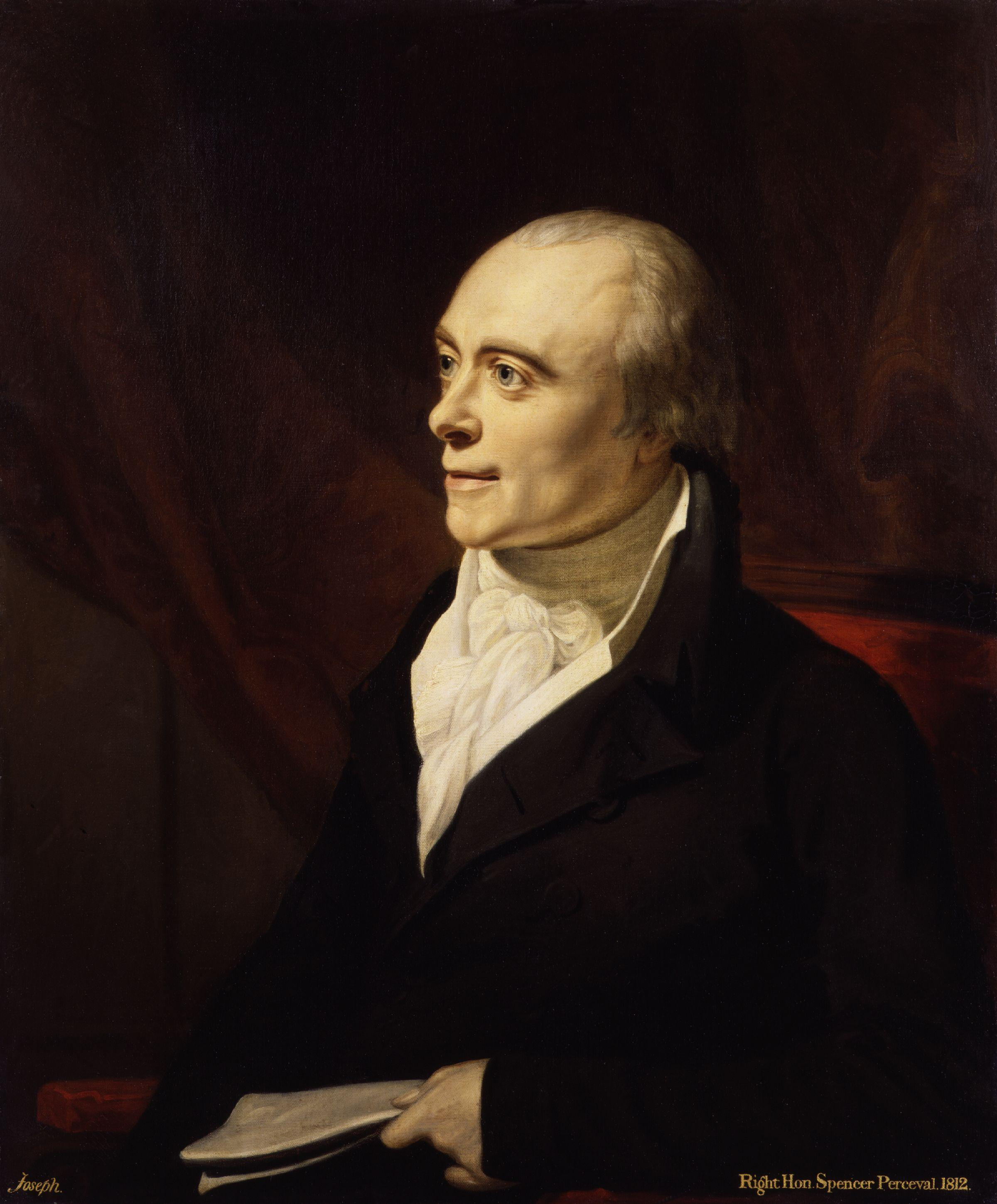
- Posthumous portrait by G. F. Joseph, 1812

Prime Minister of the United Kingdom
- In office 4 October 1809 – 11 May 1812
- Monarch: George III
- Regent: George, Prince Regent (1811–12)
- Preceded by: The Duke of Portland
- Succeeded by: The Earl of Liverpool

Chancellor of the Exchequer
- In office 26 March 1807 – 11 May 1812
- Prime Minister: The Duke of Portland; Himself
- Preceded by: Lord Henry Petty
- Succeeded by: Nicholas Vansittart

Leader of the House of Commons
- In office April 1807 – 11 May 1812
- Prime Minister: The Duke of Portland; Himself
- Preceded by: The Viscount Howick
- Succeeded by: The Viscount Castlereagh

Chancellor of the Duchy of Lancaster
- In office 30 March 1807 – 11 May 1812
- Prime Minister: The Duke of Portland; Himself
- Preceded by: The Earl of Derby
- Succeeded by: The Earl of Buckinghamshire

Attorney General for England and Wales
- In office 15 April 1802 – 12 February 1806
- Prime Minister: Henry Addington; William Pitt the Younger
- Preceded by: Sir Edward Law
- Succeeded by: Arthur Piggott

Solicitor General for England and Wales
- In office 1801–1802
- Prime Minister: Henry Addington
- Preceded by: Sir William Grant
- Succeeded by: Thomas Manners-Sutton

Member of Parliament for Northampton
- In office 9 May 1796 – 11 May 1812
- Preceded by: Charles Compton
- Succeeded by: Spencer Compton

Personal details
- Born: 1 November 1762 Mayfair, Middlesex, England
- Died: 11 May 1812 (aged 49) Westminster, Middlesex, England
- Cause of death: Assassination
- Resting place: St Luke's Church, Charlton
- Party: Tory
- Spouse: Jane Wilson (m. 1790)
- Children: 13, including Spencer and John Thomas
- Parents: 2nd Earl of Egmont (father); Catherine Compton (mother)
- Education: Trinity College, Cambridge
- Occupation: Politician; barrister

Spencer Perceval (1 November 1762 – 11 May 1812) was Prime Minister of the United Kingdom from October 1809 until his assassination in May 1812. He is the only British prime minister to have been assassinated, and the only solicitor-general or attorney-general to have become prime minister.

The younger son of The Earl of Egmont, an Anglo-Irish earl, Perceval was educated at Harrow School and Trinity College, Cambridge. He studied law at Lincoln's Inn, practised as a barrister on the Midland circuit, and in 1796 became a King's Counsel. He entered politics at age 33 as a member of Parliament (MP) for Northampton. A follower of William Pitt the Younger, Perceval always described himself as a "friend of Mr. Pitt", rather than a Tory. He was opposed to Catholic emancipation and reform of Parliament; he supported the war against Napoleon and the abolition of the Atlantic slave trade.

After a late entry into politics, his rise to power was rapid; he was appointed as Solicitor General and then Attorney General for England and Wales in the Addington ministry, Chancellor of the Exchequer and Leader of the House of Commons in the second Portland ministry, and then became prime minister in 1809. At the head of a weak government, Perceval faced a number of crises during his term in office, including an inquiry into the Walcheren expedition, the mental illness and incapacity of King George III, economic depression, and Luddite riots. He overcame those crises, successfully pursued the Peninsular War in the face of opposition defeatism, and won the support of the Prince Regent. His position was stronger by early 1812, when in the lobby of the House of Commons, he was assassinated by John Bellingham, a merchant with a grievance against his government. Bellingham was hanged one week later.

Perceval had four older brothers who survived to adulthood. Through expiry of their male-line, male heirs, the earldom of Egmont passed to one of his great-grandsons in the early 20th century and became extinct in 2011.

== Childhood and education ==
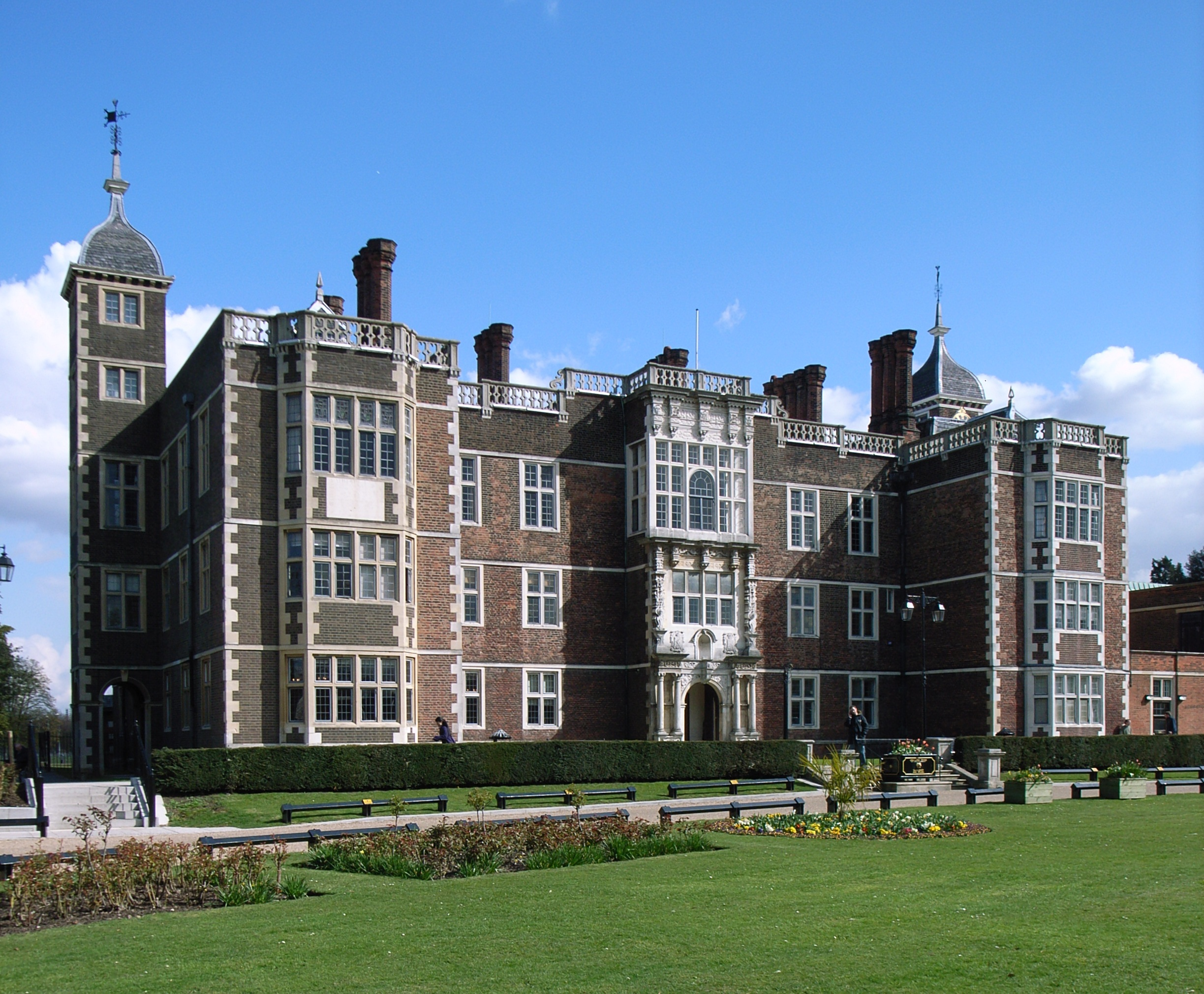
Perceval's early childhood was spent at Charlton House (pictured)

Perceval was born in Audley Square, Mayfair, London, the seventh son of the 2nd Earl of Egmont; he was the second son of the Earl's second marriage. His mother, Catherine Compton, Baroness Arden, was a granddaughter of the 4th Earl of Northampton. Spencer was a Compton family name; Catherine Compton's great-uncle Spencer Compton, 1st Earl of Wilmington, had been prime minister.

His father, a political adviser to Frederick, Prince of Wales and King George III, served briefly in the cabinet as First Lord of the Admiralty. Perceval's early childhood was spent at Charlton House, London, which his father had taken to be near Woolwich Dockyard.

Lord Egmont, Perceval's father, died when he was eight. Perceval went to Harrow School, where he was a disciplined and hard-working pupil. It was at Harrow that he developed an interest in evangelical Anglicanism and formed what was to be a lifelong friendship with Dudley Ryder. After five years at Harrow, he followed his older brother Charles to Trinity College, Cambridge. There he won the declamation prize in English and graduated in 1782.

== Legal career and marriage ==
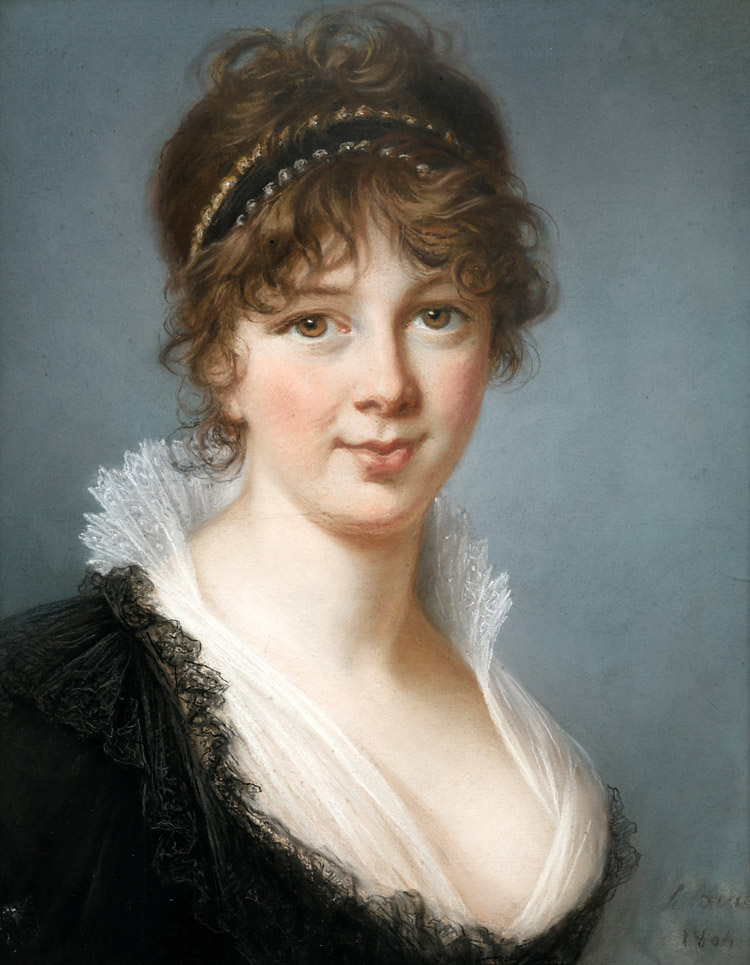
Jane Perceval (née Wilson) by Vigée Le Brun, 1804

As the second son of a second marriage, Perceval had an allowance of just £200 a year and, without the prospect of inherited wealth, had to make his own way in life. (Note: Under primogeniture, the first son inherited land and title.) He chose the law as a profession, studied at Lincoln's Inn, and was called to the bar in 1786. Perceval's mother had died in 1783.

Perceval and his older brother Charles, now Lord Arden, rented a house in Charlton, where they fell in love with two sisters who were living in the Percevals' old childhood home. The sisters' father, Sir Thomas Spencer Wilson, approved of the match between his eldest daughter Margaretta and Lord Arden, who was wealthy and already a Member of Parliament and a Lord of the Admiralty.

Perceval, who was at that time an impecunious barrister on the Midland Circuit, was told to wait until the younger daughter, Jane, came of age in three years' time. When Jane reached 21, in 1790, Perceval's career was still not prospering, and Sir Thomas still opposed the marriage. The couple eloped and married by special licence in East Grinstead. They set up home together in lodgings over a carpet shop in Bedford Row, later moving to Lindsey House, Lincoln's Inn Fields.

Perceval's family connections enabled him to obtain a number of positions: Deputy Recorder of Northampton, and commissioner of bankrupts in 1790; surveyor of the Maltings and clerk of the irons in the mint - a sinecure worth £119 a year - in 1791; and counsel to the Board of Admiralty in 1794. He acted as junior counsel for the Crown in the trial of Thomas Paine for seditious libel (1792), and the prosecution of John Horne Tooke for high treason (1794). Perceval joined the London and Westminster Light Horse Volunteers in 1794 when the country was under threat of invasion by France and served with them until 1803.

Perceval wrote anonymous pamphlets in favour of the impeachment of Warren Hastings, and in defence of public order against sedition. These pamphlets brought him to the attention of William Pitt the Younger, and in 1795 he was offered the appointment of Chief Secretary for Ireland. He declined the offer as he could earn more as a barrister and needed the money to support his growing family. In 1796 he became a King's Counsel at the age of 33 and had an income of about £1,000 a year (equivalent to £98,000 in 2025).

== Early political career: 1796–1801 ==
In 1796, Perceval's uncle, the 8th Earl of Northampton, died. Perceval's cousin Charles Compton, who was MP for Northampton, succeeded to the earldom and took his place in the House of Lords. Perceval was invited to stand for election in his place. In the May by-election, Perceval was elected unopposed. Weeks later, he had to defend his seat in a fiercely contested general election. Northampton had an electorate of about 1,000 – every male householder not in receipt of poor relief had a vote - and the town had a strong radical tradition. Perceval stood for the Castle Ashby interest, Edward Bouverie for the Whigs, and William Walcot for the corporation. After a disputed count, Perceval and Bouverie were returned. Perceval represented Northampton until his death 16 years later, and is the only MP for Northampton to have held the office of prime minister. 1796 was his first and last contested election; in the general elections of 1802, 1806 and 1807, Perceval and Bouverie were returned unopposed.

When Perceval took his seat in the House of Commons in September 1796, his political views were already formed. "He was for the constitution and Pitt; he was against Fox and France", wrote his biographer Denis Gray. During the 1796-1797 session, he made several speeches, always reading from notes. His public speaking skills had been sharpened at the Crown and Rolls debating society when he was a law student. After taking his seat in the House of Commons, Perceval continued with his legal practice, as MPs did not receive a salary, and the House only sat for a part of the year. During the Parliamentary recess of the summer of 1797, he was senior counsel for the Crown in the prosecution of John Binns for sedition. Binns, who was defended by Samuel Romilly, was found not guilty. The fees from his legal practice allowed Perceval to take out a lease on a country house, Belsize House in Hampstead.

It was during the next session of Parliament, in January 1798, that Perceval established his reputation as a debater - and his prospects as a future minister - with a speech in support of the Assessed Taxes Bill (a bill to increase the taxes on houses, windows, male servants, horses, and carriages, in order to finance the war against France). He used the occasion to mount an attack on Charles Fox and his demands for reform. Pitt described the speech as one of the best he had ever heard, and later that year Perceval was appointed to the post of Solicitor to the Ordnance.

== Solicitor and attorney general: 1801–1806 ==
Pitt resigned in 1801 when both George III and the Cabinet opposed his bill for Catholic emancipation. As Perceval shared the King's views on Catholic emancipation, he did not feel obliged to follow Pitt into opposition. His career continued to prosper during Henry Addington's administration. He was appointed solicitor general in 1801 and attorney general the following year. Perceval did not agree with Addington's general policies (especially on foreign policy), and confined himself to speeches on legal issues. He was retained in the position of attorney general when Addington resigned, and Pitt formed his second ministry in 1804. As attorney general, Perceval was involved with the prosecution of radicals Edward Despard and William Cobbett, but was also responsible for more liberal decisions on trade unions, and for improving the conditions of convicts transported to New South Wales.

When Pitt died in January 1806, Perceval was an emblem bearer at his funeral. Although he had little money to spare (by now he had 11 children), he contributed £1,000 towards a fund to pay off Pitt's debts. He resigned as attorney general, refusing to serve in Lord Grenville's Ministry of All the Talents, as it included Fox. Instead he became the leader of the Pittite opposition in the House of Commons.

During his period in opposition, Perceval used his legal skills to defend Princess Caroline, the estranged wife of the Prince of Wales, during the "delicate investigation". The princess had been accused of giving birth to an illegitimate child, and the Prince of Wales ordered an inquiry, hoping to obtain evidence for a divorce. The government inquiry found that the main accusation was untrue (the child in question had been adopted by the princess), but it was critical of the behaviour of the princess. The opposition sprang to her defence and Perceval became her adviser, drafting a 156-page letter to King George III in her support. Known as The Book, it was described by Perceval's biographer as "the last and greatest production of his legal career". When the King refused to let Caroline return to court, Perceval threatened publication of The Book, but Grenville's ministry fell - again over a difference of opinion with the King on the Catholic question - before The Book could be distributed. As a member of the new government, Perceval drafted a cabinet minute acquitting Caroline on all charges and recommending her return to court. He had a bonfire of The Book at Lindsey House, and large sums of government money were spent on buying back stray copies. A few remained at large and The Book was published soon after Perceval's death.

== Chancellor of the Exchequer: 1807–1809 ==
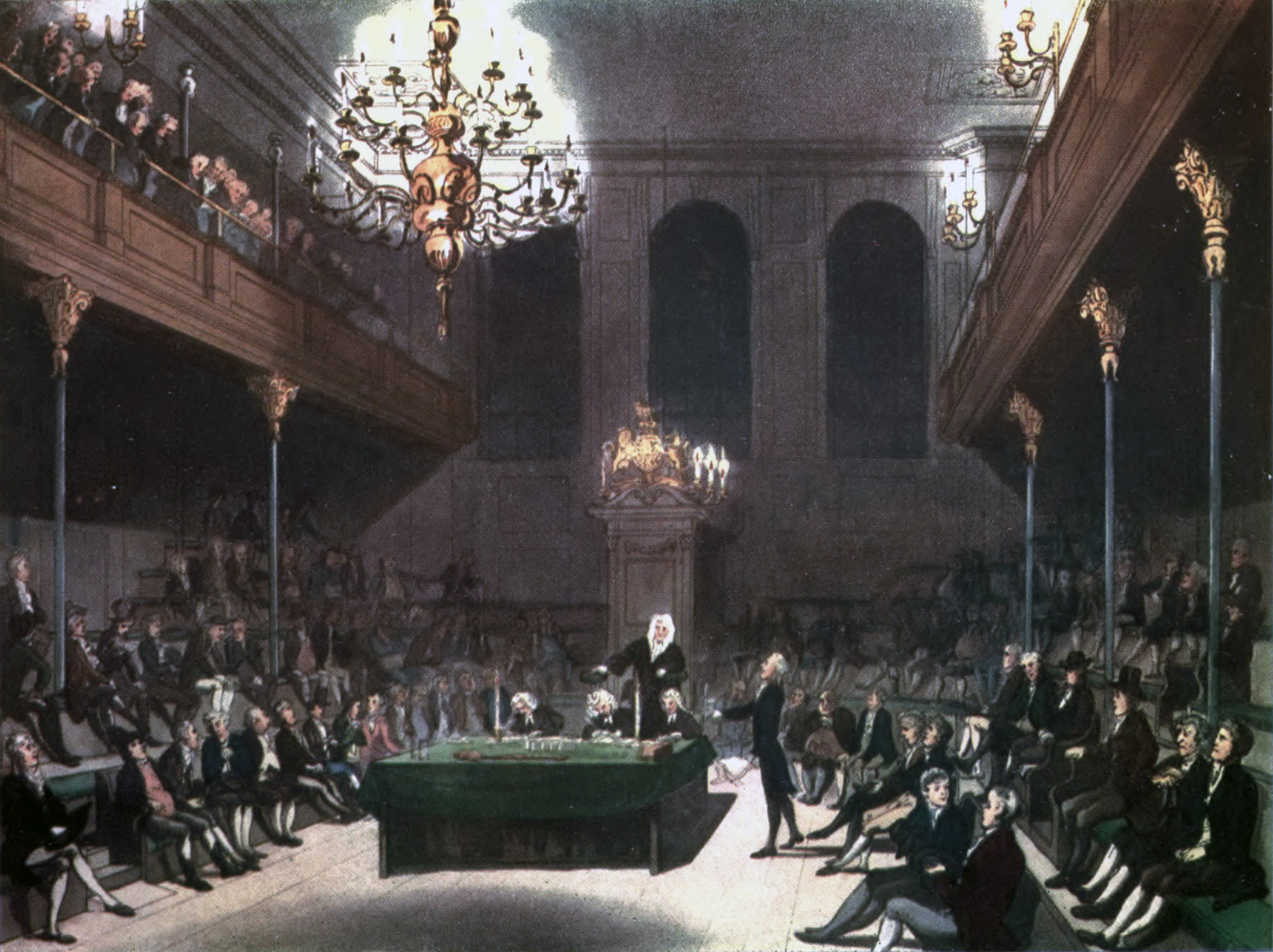
Engraving of the British House of Commons, 1808

On the resignation of Grenville, the Duke of Portland put together a ministry of Pittites and asked Perceval to become Chancellor of the Exchequer and Leader of the House of Commons. Perceval would have preferred to remain attorney general or become Home Secretary, and pleaded ignorance of financial affairs. He agreed to take the position when the salary (smaller than that of the Home Office) was augmented by the Duchy of Lancaster. Lord Hawkesbury (later Liverpool) recommended Perceval to the King by explaining that he came from an old English family and shared the King's views on the Catholic question.

Perceval's youngest child, Ernest Augustus, was born soon after Perceval became chancellor (Princess Caroline was godmother). Jane Perceval became ill after the birth and the family moved out of the damp and draughty Belsize House, spending a few months in Lord Teignmouth's house in Clapham before finding a suitable country house in Ealing. Perceval paid £7,500 for the 17th century Elm Grove in 1808 (borrowing from his brother Lord Arden and the trustees of Jane's dowry), and the Perceval family's long association with Ealing began. Meanwhile, in town, Perceval had moved from Lindsey House into 10 Downing Street, when the Duke of Portland moved back to Burlington House shortly after becoming prime minister.

One of Perceval's first tasks in Cabinet was to expand the Orders in Council that had been brought in by the previous administration and were designed to restrict the trade of neutral countries with France, in retaliation to Napoleon's embargo on British trade. He was also responsible for ensuring that Wilberforce's bill on the abolition of the slave trade, which had still not passed its final stages in the House of Lords when Grenville's ministry fell, would not "fall between the two ministries" and be rejected in a snap division. Perceval was one of the founding members of the African Institute, which was set up in April 1807 to safeguard the Abolition of the Slave Trade Act.

As Chancellor of the Exchequer, Perceval had to raise money to finance the war against Napoleon. This he managed to do in his budgets of 1808 and 1809 without increasing taxes, by raising loans at reasonable rates and making economies. As leader of the House of Commons, he had to deal with a strong opposition, which challenged the government over the conduct of the war, Catholic emancipation, corruption, and Parliamentary reform. Perceval successfully defended the commander-in-chief of the army, the Duke of York, against charges of corruption when the Duke's ex-mistress Mary Anne Clarke claimed to have sold army commissions with his knowledge. Although Parliament voted to acquit the Duke of the main charge, his conduct was criticised, and he accepted Perceval's advice to resign. (He was reinstated in 1811).

== Prime Minister: 1809–1812 ==
Portland's ministry contained three future prime-ministers - Perceval, Lord Hawkesbury and George Canning – as well as another two of the 19th-century's great statesmen: Lord Eldon and Lord Castlereagh. But Portland was not a strong leader and his health was failing. The country was plunged into political crisis in the summer of 1809 as Canning schemed against Castlereagh, and the Duke of Portland resigned following a stroke. Negotiations began to find a new prime minister: Canning wanted to be either prime minister or nothing; Perceval was prepared to serve under a third person, but not under Canning. The remnants of the cabinet decided to invite Lord Grey and Lord Grenville to form "an extended and combined administration" in which Perceval was hoping for the home secretaryship. But Grenville and Grey refused to enter into negotiations, and the King accepted the Cabinet's recommendation of Perceval for his new prime minister.

Perceval kissed the King's hands on 4 October and set about forming his cabinet. The task was made more difficult by the fact that both Castlereagh and Canning had ruled themselves out of consideration by fighting a duel. Having received five refusals for the office, Perceval had to serve as his own Chancellor of the Exchequer - characteristically declining to accept the salary.

The new ministry was not expected to last. It was especially weak in the Commons, where Perceval had only one cabinet member– Home Secretary Richard Ryder - and had to rely on the support of backbenchers in debate. In the first week of the new Parliamentary session in January 1810 the government lost four divisions, one on a motion for an inquiry into the Walcheren Expedition (in which, the previous summer, a military force intending to seize Antwerp had instead withdrawn after losing many men to an epidemic on the island of Walcheren off the Dutch coast) and three on the composition of the finance committee. The government survived the inquiry into the Walcheren Expedition at the cost of the resignation of the expedition's leader Lord Chatham. The radical MP Sir Francis Burdett was committed to the Tower of London for having published a letter in William Cobbett's Political Register which denounced the government's exclusion of the press from the inquiry. It took three days, owing to various blunders, to execute the warrant for Burdett's arrest. The mob took to the streets in support of Burdett and troops were called out. As Chancellor, Perceval continued to find the funds to finance Wellington's campaign in the Iberian Peninsula, whilst contracting a lower debt than his predecessors or successors.

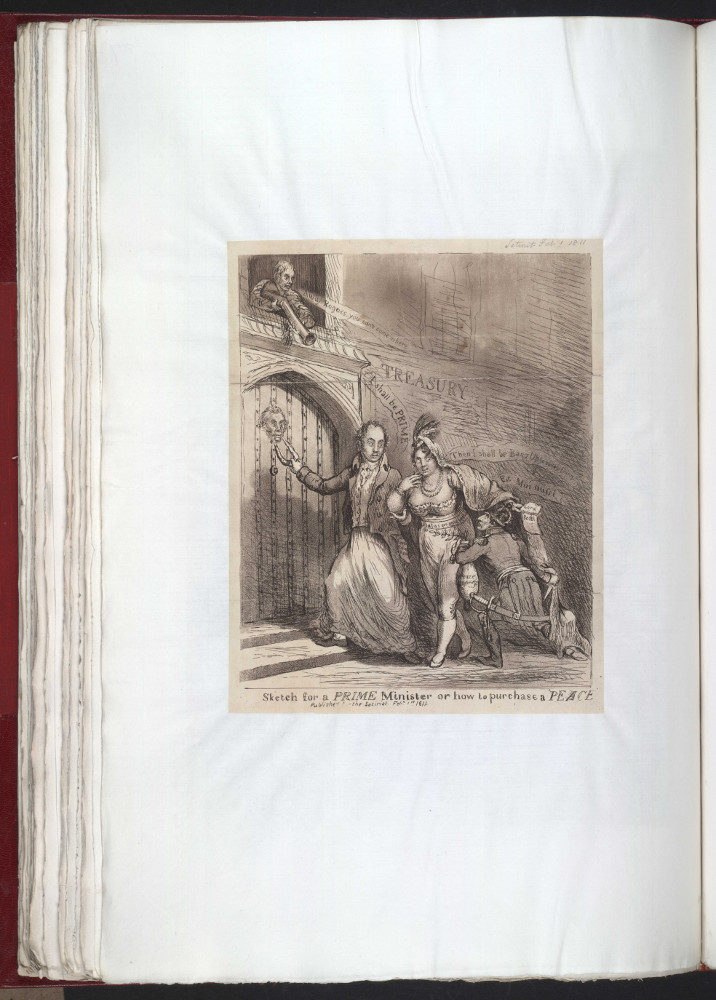
Sketch for a Prime Minister by Samuel De Wilde in The Satirist, 1811

King George III had celebrated his Golden Jubilee in 1809; by the following autumn he was showing signs of a return of the illness that had led to the threat of a Regency in 1788. The prospect of a Regency was not attractive to Perceval, as the Prince of Wales was known to favour Whigs and disliked Perceval for the part he had played in the "delicate investigation". Twice Parliament was adjourned in November 1810, as doctors gave optimistic reports about the King's chances of a return to health. In December select committees of the Lords and Commons heard evidence from the doctors, and Perceval finally wrote to the Prince of Wales on 19 December saying that he planned the next day to introduce a regency bill. As with Pitt's bill in 1788, there would be restrictions: the regent's powers to create peers and award offices and pensions would be restricted for 12 months, Queen Charlotte would be responsible for the care of the King, and the King's private property would be looked after by trustees. The Prince of Wales, supported by the Opposition, objected to the restrictions, but Perceval steered the bill through Parliament. Everyone had expected the Regent to change his ministers but, surprisingly, he chose to retain his old enemy Perceval. The official reason given by the Regent was that he did not wish to do anything to aggravate his father's illness. The King assented to the Regency Bill on 5 February, the Regent took the royal oath the following day and Parliament formally opened for the 1811 session. The session was largely taken up with problems in Ireland, the bullion controversy in England (a bill was passed to make bank notes legal tender), and military operations in the Peninsula.

When the restrictions on the Regency expired in February 1812, the King still showed no signs of recovery, and the Prince Regent decided, after an unsuccessful attempt to persuade Grey and Grenville to join the government, to retain Perceval and his ministers. Richard Wellesley, 1st Marquess Wellesley, after intrigues with the Prince Regent, resigned as foreign secretary and was replaced by Castlereagh. The opposition meanwhile was mounting an attack on the Orders in Council, which had caused a crisis in relations with the United States and were widely blamed for depression and unemployment in England. Rioting had broken out in the Midlands and Northern England, and been harshly repressed. Henry Brougham's motion for a select committee was defeated in the Commons, but, under continuing pressure from manufacturers, the government agreed to set up a Committee of the Whole House to consider the Orders in Council and their impact on trade and manufacture. The committee began its examination of witnesses in early May 1812.

== Assassination ==
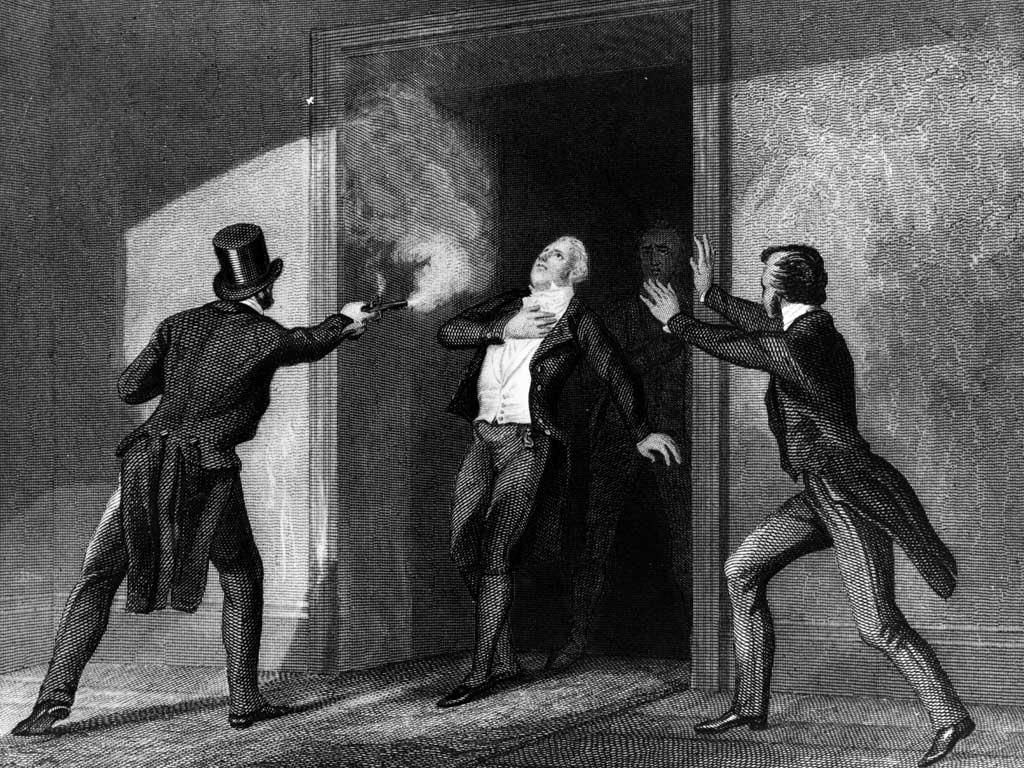
Artist's impression of Perceval's assassination, 11 May 1812

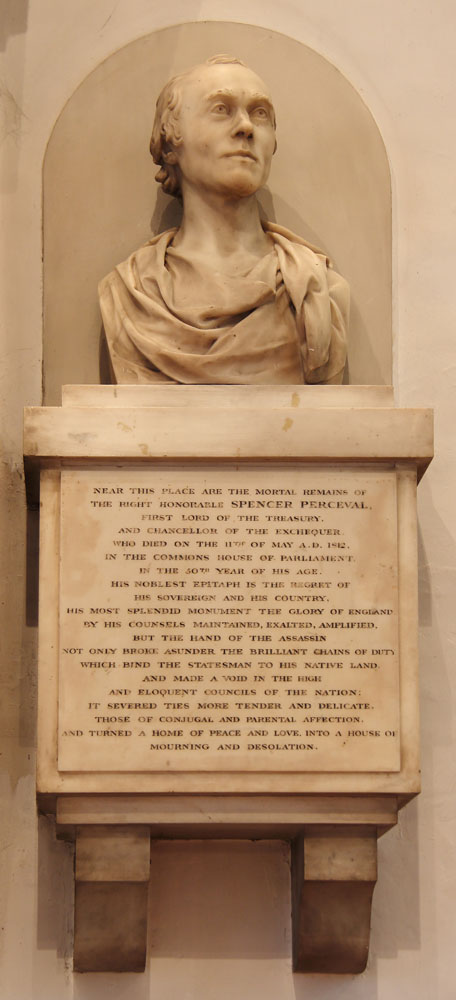
Memorial to Spencer Perceval in St Luke's Church, Charlton, where he was buried

At 5:15 pm, on the evening of 11 May 1812, Perceval was on his way to attend the inquiry into the Orders in Council. As he entered the lobby of the House of Commons, a man stepped forward, drew a pistol and shot him in the chest. Perceval fell to the floor, after uttering something that was variously heard as "murder" and "oh my God". They were his last words. By the time he had been carried into an adjoining room and propped up on a table with his feet on two chairs, he was senseless, although there was still a faint pulse. When a surgeon arrived a few minutes later, the pulse had stopped, and Perceval was declared dead.

At first it was feared that the shot might signal the start of an uprising, but it soon became apparent that the assassin—who had made no attempt to escape—was a man with an obsessive grievance against the government and had acted alone. He was John Bellingham, a merchant who believed he had been unjustly imprisoned in Russia and was entitled to compensation from the government, but all his petitions had been rejected. Perceval's body was laid on a sofa in the speaker's drawing room and removed to Number 10 in the early hours of 12 May. That same morning an inquest was held at the Cat and Bagpipes public house on the corner of Downing Street and a verdict of willful murder was returned.

Perceval left a widow and 12 children aged between three and 20, and there were soon rumours that he had not left them well provided for. He had just £106 5s 1d in the bank when he died. A few days after his death, Parliament voted to settle £50,000 on Perceval's children, with additional annuities for his widow and eldest son. Perceval's widow married Lieutenant-Colonel Sir Henry Carr, brother of the Reverend Robert James Carr, then vicar of Brighton, in 1815 and was widowed again six years later. She died aged 74 in 1844.

Perceval was buried on 16 May 1812 in the Egmont vault at St Luke's Church, Charlton, London. At his widow's request, it was a private funeral. Lord Eldon, Lord Liverpool, Lord Harrowby and Richard Ryder were the pall-bearers. The previous day, Bellingham had been tried, and, refusing to enter a plea of insanity, was found guilty and sentenced to death. He was executed by hanging on 18 May.

== Legacy ==
Perceval was a small, slight, and very pale man, who usually dressed in black. Lord Eldon called him "Little P". He never sat for a full-sized portrait; likenesses are either miniatures or are based on a death mask by Joseph Nollekens. Perceval was the last British prime minister to wear a powdered wig tied in a queue, and knee-breeches according to the old-fashioned style of the 18th century. He is sometimes referred to as one of Britain's forgotten prime ministers, remembered only for the manner of his death. Although not considered an inspirational leader, he is generally seen as a devout, industrious, principled man who at the head of a weak government steered the country through difficult times. A contemporary MP Henry Grattan, used a naval analogy to describe Perceval: "He is not a ship-of-the-line, but he carries many guns, is tight-built and is out in all weathers". Perceval's modern biographer, Denis Gray, described him as "a herald of the Victorians".

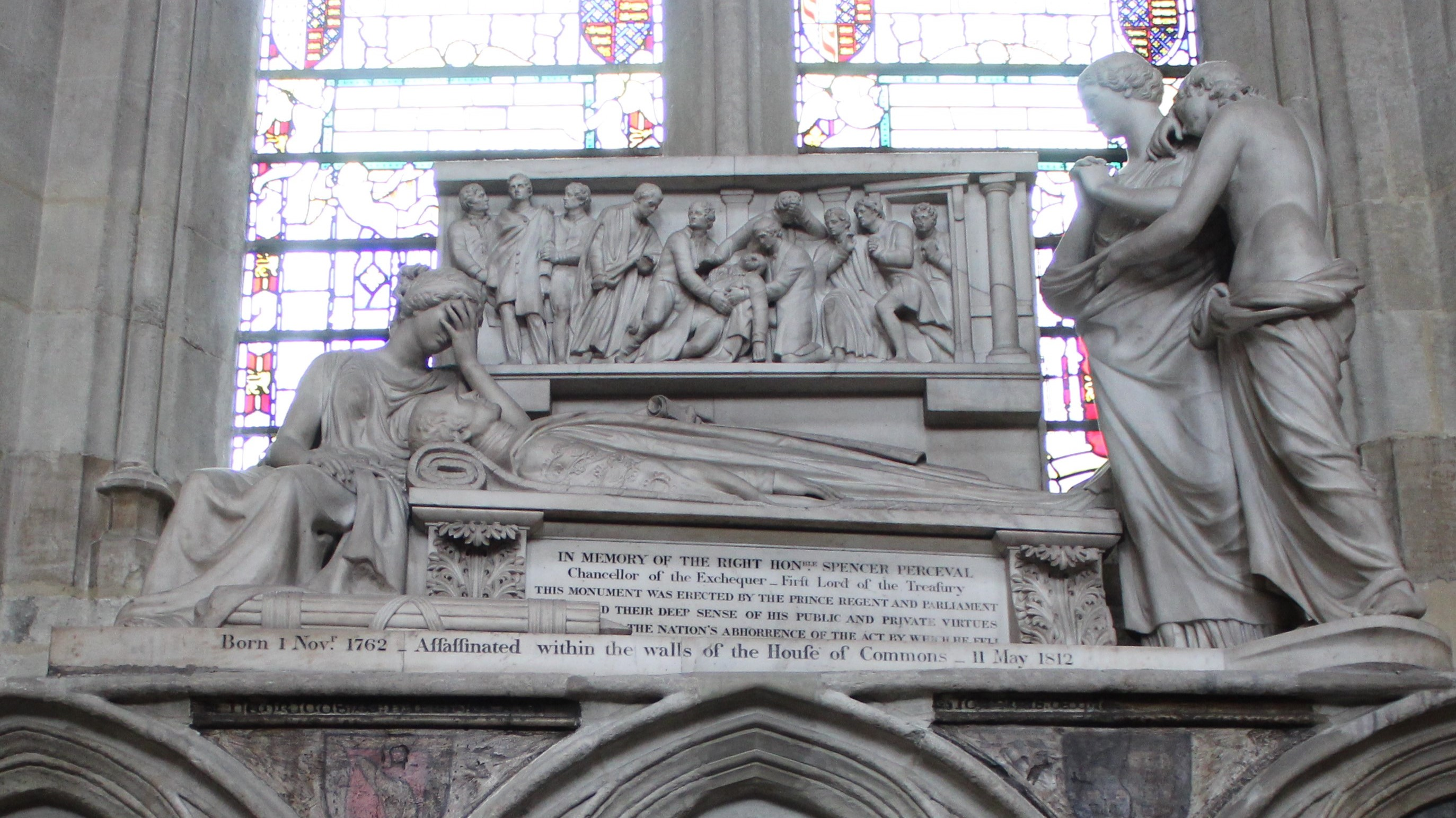
Memorial to Perceval in Westminster Abbey

Perceval was mourned by many; Lord Chief Justice Sir James Mansfield wept during his summing up to the jury at Bellingham's trial. However, in some quarters he was unpopular and in Nottingham the crowds that gathered following his assassination were in a more cheerful mood. Public monuments to Perceval were erected in Northampton, Lincoln's Inn and in Westminster Abbey. The memorial in Westminster Abbey, by the sculptor Richard Westmacott, has an effigy of the dead Perceval with mourning figures representing Truth, Temperance and Power in front of a relief depicting the aftermath of the assassination in the House of Commons. Four biographies have been published: a book on his life and administration by Charles Verulam Williams, which appeared soon after his death; his grandson Spencer Walpole's biography in 1894; Philip Treherne's short biography in 1909; Denis Gray's 500-page political biography in 1963. In addition, there are three books about his assassination, one by Mollie Gillen, one by David Hanrahan, and the latest by Andro Linklater entitled Why Spencer Perceval Had to Die.

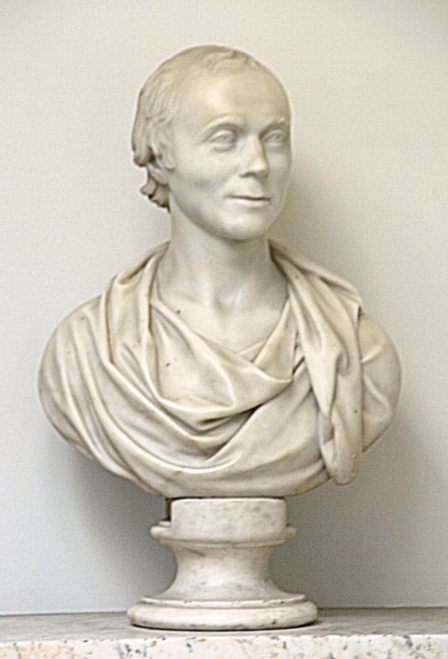
Marble bust (based on Perceval's death mask by Joseph Nollekens) at Pitzhanger Manor, London

Perceval's assassination inspired poems such as Universal sympathy on the martyr'd statesman (1812):

Such was his private, such his public life,
That all who differ'd in polemic strife,
Or varied in opinion with his plan,
Agreed with one accord to love the man.

One of Perceval's most noted critics, especially on the question of Catholic emancipation, was the cleric Sydney Smith. In Peter Plymley's Letters Smith writes:

If I lived at Hampstead upon stewed meats and claret; if I walked to church every Sunday before eleven young gentlemen of my own begetting, with their faces washed, and their hair pleasingly combed; if the Almighty had blessed me with every earthly comfort–how awfully would I pause before I sent forth the flame and the sword over the cabins of the poor, brave, generous, open-hearted peasants of Ireland!

American historian Henry Adams suggested that it was this picture of Perceval that stayed in the minds of Liberals for a whole generation.

In July 2014, a memorial plaque was unveiled in St Stephen's Hall of the Houses of Parliament, close to where he was killed. The plaque had been proposed by Michael Ellis, Conservative MP for Northampton North (parts of which Perceval once represented).

In streets in Northampton and Northamptonshire his name is memorialised as it is by the main streets set back behind two sides of Northampton Square, London: Spencer and Percival Streets.

== Family ==
Spencer and Jane Perceval had 13 children, of whom 12 survived to adulthood. Four of the daughters never married, and lived together all their lives. During their mother's life, they lived with her in Elm Grove, Ealing; after her death, the sisters moved to nearby Pitzhanger Manor House, while their brother Spencer took over Elm Grove. Cousin marriage was common: the remaining two daughters and two of the sons took this path.

1. Jane (1791-1824) married her cousin Edward Perceval, son of Lord Arden, in 1821 and lived in Felpham, Sussex. She died three years after marrying, apparently in childbirth.
2. Frances (1792-1877) lived with three unmarried sisters (Maria, Louisa and Frederica) at Pitzhanger Manor, Ealing from 1843.
3. Maria (1794-1877) lived with her three unmarried sisters.
4. Spencer (1795-1859) was, like his father, educated at Harrow and Trinity College, Cambridge. After Perceval's assassination, Spencer junior was voted an annuity of £1,000 (equivalent to £61,000 in 2025), free legal training at Lincoln's Inn and a tellership of the Exchequer, all of which left him financially secure. He became a Member of Parliament at the age of 22 and in 1821 married Anna, a daughter of the chief of the clan Macleod, with whom he had eleven children. He joined the Catholic Apostolic Church and was created an apostle in 1833. He served as a metropolitan lunacy commissioner.
5. Charles (born and died 1796)
6. Frederick James (1797-1861) was the only one of Perceval's sons not to go to Harrow. Due to his fragile health he was sent to school at Rottingdean. He married for the first time in 1827, spent some time in Ghent, Belgium, was a director of the Clerical, Medical and General Life Assurance Society and a justice of the peace for Middlesex and for Kent, but generally led a quiet and retired life. Widowed in 1843, he married for the second time the following year. A grandson, Frederick Joseph Trevelyan Perceval, who was a Canadian rancher, became the 10th de jure Earl of Egmont (he did not claim the title) and was the father of the 11th earl.
7. Rev. Henry (1799-1885) was educated at Harrow, where he was the only Perceval to become head of school. He went to Brasenose College, Oxford. In 1826 he married his cousin Catherine Drummond. For 46 years Henry was the rector of Elmley Lovett in Worcestershire.
8. Dudley Montague (1800-1856) was educated at Harrow and Christ Church, Oxford. Like his brother Spencer, he was given free legal training at Lincoln's Inn but was not called to the bar. He spent two years as an administrator at the Cape of Good Hope, where he married a daughter of Gen. Sir Richard Bourke, future Governor of New South Wales, in 1827. Back in England he obtained a treasury post and defended his father's reputation after it was attacked in Napier's history of the Peninsular War. In 1853 he stood unsuccessfully against William Gladstone in the election for an MP to represent Oxford University.
9. Isabella (1801-1886) married her cousin Spencer Horatio Walpole in 1835 and was the only one of Perceval's daughters to have children. Her husband was a lawyer who became an MP in 1846 and served as Home Secretary. They lived in the Hall on Ealing Green, next-door to Isabella's four unmarried sisters.
10. John Thomas (1803-1876) was educated at Harrow. After a three-year career as an officer in the Grenadier Guards and a term at Oxford University, he spent three years in asylums and became a campaigner for reform of the Lunacy Laws. In 1832, just after his release from an asylum, he married a cheesemonger's daughter.
11. Louisa (1804-1891) lived with her three unmarried sisters.
12. Frederica (1805-1900) lived with her three unmarried sisters. In her will she left money to build All Saints Church, Ealing, in memory of her father (he was born on All Saints Day). It is also known as the Spencer Perceval Memorial Church.
13. Ernest Augustus (1807-1896) was educated at Harrow. He spent nine years in the 15th Hussars, seven of them as a captain. In 1830, he married his cousin Beatrice Trevelyan, daughter of Sir John Trevelyan, 5th Baronet. The couple settled in Somerset and raised a large family, including antiquary Spencer George Perceval. Ernest served as private secretary to the Home Office on three occasions.

== Arms ==
Coat of arms of Spencer Perceval
Crest A thistle erect leaved proper. Escutcheon Quarterly 1 & 4, Argent, on a chief indented gules three crosses patée of the field (Perceval); 2 & 3, Barry nebulé or and gules (Lovel). Motto Sub cruce candida (Under the white cross).

== Cabinet of Spencer Perceval ==
Portfolio	Minister	Took office	Left office
First Lord of the Treasury; Leader of the House of Commons; Chancellor of the Exchequer; Chancellor of the Duchy of Lancaster	Spencer Perceval (head of ministry)	4 October 1809	11 May 1812
Lord Chancellor	John Scott, 1st Earl of Eldon	1807	1827
Lord President of the Council	John Pratt, 1st Earl Camden	26 March 1807	8 April 1812
Lord President of the Council	Henry Addington, 1st Viscount Sidmouth	8 April 1812	11 June 1812
Lord Privy Seal	John Fane, 10th Earl of Westmorland	1807	1827
Secretary of State for the Home Department	Richard Ryder	1 November 1809	8 June 1812
Secretary of State for Foreign Affairs	Henry Bathurst, 3rd Earl Bathurst	1 November 1809	6 December 1809
Secretary of State for Foreign Affairs	Richard Wellesley, 1st Marquess Wellesley	6 December 1809	4 March 1812
Secretary of State for Foreign Affairs	Robert Stewart, Viscount Castlereagh	4 March 1812	12 August 1822
President of the Board of Trade	Henry Bathurst, 3rd Earl Bathurst	31 March 1807	29 September 1812
Secretary of State for War and the Colonies; Leader of the House of Lords	Robert Jenkinson, 2nd Earl of Liverpool	1 November 1809	11 June 1812
First Lord of the Admiralty	Henry Phipps, 1st Earl of Mulgrave	1807	1810
First Lord of the Admiralty	Charles Philip Yorke	1810	1812
Master-General of the Ordnance	John Pitt, 2nd Earl of Chatham	1807	1810
Master-General of the Ordnance	Henry Phipps, 1st Earl of Mulgrave	1810	1819
Minister without Portfolio	Dudley Ryder, 1st Earl of Harrowby	November 1809	June 1812
Minister without Portfolio	John Pratt, 1st Earl Camden	8 April 1812	December 1812

== In literature ==
Spencer Percival features as a character in John Buchan's novel The Free Fishers (1934).

== See also ==
- Earl of Egmont
- List of heads of state and government who were assassinated or executed

== Bibliography ==
- Adams, Henry (1986). History of the United States of America during the Administrations of Thomas Jefferson. Library of America. ISBN 978-0-940450-34-9.
- Bolitho, Hector; Peel, Derek Wilmot (1967). The Drummonds of Charing Cross. London: George Allen & Unwin. ASIN B0000CNPGD.
- Gault, Hugh (2010). Living History: A Family's 19th Century. Cambridge: Gretton Books. ISBN 978-0-9562041-1-0.
- Gillen, Mollie (1972). Assassination of the Prime Minister: The Shocking Death of Spencer Perceval. London: Sidgwick and Jackson. ISBN 978-0-283-97881-4.
- Gray, Denis (1963). Spencer Perceval: The Evangelical Prime Minister, 1762–1812. Manchester University Press.
- Howard, Joseph Jackson; Crisp, Frederick Arthur, eds. (1898). Visitation of England and Wales. Vol. 6. London: Privately printed. p. 89.
- Iremonger, Lucille (1970). The Fiery Chariot: A Study of British Prime Ministers and the Search for Love. London: Secker and Warburg. pp. 43–51. ISBN 978-0-436-21801-9.
- Mosley, Charles, ed. (2003). Burke's Peerage, Baronetage & Knighthood (107 ed.). Burke's Peerage & Gentry. pp. 1287–1288. ISBN 978-0-9711966-2-9.
- Stanley, Arthur Penrhyn (1882). Historical Memorials of Westminster Abbey. London: John Murray. p. 222.
- Thorne, R.G., ed. (1986). "Perceval, Hon. Spencer (1762–1812), of Elm Grove, Ealing, Mdx.". The History of Parliament: the House of Commons 1790–1820. Vol. IV. London: Secker & Warburg. pp. 764–774.
- Treherne, Philip (1909). The Right Honourable Spencer Perceval. London: T. Fisher Unwin. OL 251625W.

Political offices
Preceded by Lord Henry Petty	Chancellor of the Exchequer; 1807–1812	Succeeded by Nicholas Vansittart
Preceded by Viscount Howick	Leader of the House of Commons; 1807–1812	Succeeded by Viscount Castlereagh
Preceded by The Earl of Derby	Chancellor of the Duchy of Lancaster; 1807–1812	Succeeded by The Earl of Buckinghamshire
Preceded by The Duke of Portland	Prime Minister of the United Kingdom; 4 October 1809 – 11 May 1812	Succeeded by The Earl of Liverpool
Parliament of the United Kingdom
Preceded by Lord Compton; Hon. Edward Bouverie	Member of Parliament for Northampton; 1796–1812; With: Hon. Edward Bouverie 1796–1810; William Hanbury 1810–1812	Succeeded by William Hanbury Bateman; Earl Compton
Legal offices
Preceded by Sir William Grant	Solicitor General for England and Wales; 1801–1802	Succeeded by Sir Thomas Manners-Sutton
Preceded by Sir Edward Law	Attorney General for England and Wales; 1802–1806	Succeeded by Sir Arthur Piggott
