= Edward Mellish =

Edward Mellish may refer to:

- Edward Noel Mellish (1880–1962), English recipient of the Victoria Cross
- Edward Mellish (priest) (1766–1830), Anglican priest
