= Maryon-Wilson baronets =

Extinct baronetcy in the Baronetage of England

Escutcheon of the Maryon-Wilson baronets of Eastbourne

The Wilson, later Maryon-Wilson Baronetcy, of East Borne in the County of Sussex, was a title in the Baronetage of England. It was created on 4 March 1661 for William Wilson, of East Borne Place (now Compton Place) in the parish of Eastbourne, Sussex, a descendant of Sir Thomas Wilson (1524–1581), Knight, Secretary of State to Queen Elizabeth I.

The sixth Baronet sat as Member of Parliament for Sussex, from 1774 to 1780. The eleventh Baronet assumed the additional surname of Maryon in 1899. The title became extinct on the death of the thirteenth Baronet in 1978.

== Wilson, later Maryon-Wilson baronets, of Eastbourne (1661) ==
- Sir William Wilson, 1st Baronet (c. 1608–1685)
- Sir William Wilson, 2nd Baronet (c. 1644–1718)
- Sir William Wilson, 3rd Baronet (c. 1704–1724)
- Sir Thomas Wilson, 4th Baronet (c. 1682–1759)
- Sir Edward Wilson, 5th Baronet (c. 1725–1760)
- Sir Thomas Spencer Wilson, 6th Baronet (1727–1798)
- Sir Thomas Maryon Wilson, 7th Baronet (c. 1773–1821)
- Sir Thomas Maryon Wilson, 8th Baronet (1800–1869)
- Sir John Maryon Wilson, 9th Baronet (1802–1876)
- Sir Spencer Maryon Maryon-Wilson, 10th Baronet (1829–1897)
- Sir Spencer Pocklington Maryon-Wilson, 11th Baronet (1859–1944)
- Sir George Percy Maryon Maryon-Wilson, 12th Baronet (1898–1965)
- Sir Hubert Guy Maryon Maryon-Wilson, 13th Baronet (1888–1978)
