= Thomas Spencer Wilson =

Sir Thomas Spencer Wilson, 6th Baronet
- Born: 25 January 1727
- Died: August 29, 1798 (aged 71)
- Relatives: Jane Weller (wife); Charles Perceval, 2nd Baron Arden (son-in-law); Spencer Perceval (son-in-law)
- Military career
- Allegiance: Kingdom of Great Britain
- Branch: British Army
- Rank: General
- Units: 8th Regiment of Foot; 2nd Regiment of Foot Guards; 50th Regiment of Foot
- Conflicts: Seven Years' War (Battle of Minden); Flanders campaign Jacobite rising of 1745
- Other work: Member of Parliament for Sussex (1774–1780)

General Sir Thomas Spencer Wilson, 6th Baronet (25 January 1727 – 29 August 1798) was an officer of the British Army and politician who sat in the House of Commons from 1774 to 1780.

The son of Sir Thomas Wilson, 4th Baronet, he was educated at Charterhouse School. He succeeded his brother in the baronetcy in 1760. By his wife, Jane Weller, he had one son and three daughters. One daughter, Margaretta, married Charles Perceval, 2nd Baron Arden and another, Jane, married his brother Spencer Perceval, the future prime minister.

He joined the British Army as an ensign in the 8th Regiment of Foot in 1744. He reached the rank of captain in that regiment, and on 14 April 1762, became a captain-lieutenant in the 2nd Regiment of Foot Guards. He progressed through the ranks to Major-General in 1777. He was made colonel of the 50th Regiment of Foot from 1777 until his death, promoted to lieutenant-general in 1782 and full general in 1796. He took part in the war in Flanders, the rebellion in Scotland, the war in Germany, where he was aide-de-camp to Lord Waldegrave at the battle of Minden, and in three expeditions on the coast of France.

He was MP for Sussex from 1774 to 1780.

Military offices
Preceded by Sir George Monson	Colonel of the 50th Regiment of Foot; 1777–1798	Succeeded by James Duff
Parliament of Great Britain
Preceded by Lord George Lennox; Richard Harcourt	Member of Parliament for Sussex; 1774 – 1780; With: Lord George Lennox	Succeeded by Lord George Lennox; Thomas Pelham
Baronetage of England
Preceded by Edward Wilson	Baronet (of Eastbourne); 1760-1798	Succeeded by Thomas Maryon Wilson
