= Hartwell (1787 ship) =

British East India Company ship that sank

History

Great Britain
- Name: Hartwell
- Owner: John Fiott
- Builder: Caleb Crookenden and Co., West Itchenor, West Sussex
- Completed: February 1787
- Fate: Wrecked and sunk, 24 May 1787

General characteristics
- Type: East Indiaman
- Tons burthen: 937, or 93766/94 (bm)
- Length: 151 ft 2 in (46.1 m)
- Beam: 38 ft (11.6 m)
- Depth of hold: 16 ft (4.9 m)
- Sail plan: Full-rigged ship
- Crew: 113
- Armament: 26 guns

Hartwell was a 3-decker ship of the British East India Company (EIC) launched in 1787. On her maiden voyage she ran aground and sank off the Cape Verde Islands off West Africa.

== Career ==
Caleb Crookenden and Co. of West Itchenor, West Sussex, launched Hartwell in February 1787, for Captain John Fiott. He claimed she was the largest ship of her kind in the service of the EIC.

Captain Edward Fiott sailed Hartwell from The Downs on 25 April 1787, bound for China. She was on her maiden voyage, loaded with goods including 209,280 troy ounces (6,509 kg) of silver.

After severe Atlantic gales, on 20 May, a mutiny broke out when the crew refused to extinguish lights. Fiott arrested and confined three men, but with half the crew still refusing to obey orders, he changed course and headed for the Cape Verde islands, where he intended to hand over the mutineers to the authorities. However, on 24 May Hartwell ran onto a reef three leagues north-east of the island of Boa Vista. Although she broke up and sank, all the crew were saved.

The basis of the mutiny was the crew's attempt to seize the treasure Hartwell was carrying. Captain Fiott's indecisiveness aggravated the situation. The EIC conducted an enquiry that led the EIC on 22 June 1787 to dismiss him from its service.

One of the midshipmen aboard was John Bellingham, later notorious as the assassin of British Prime Minister Spencer Perceval.

== Salvage ==
Between 1788 and 1791, under an East India Company contract, the Braithwaite brothers reportedly recovered 97,650 silver dollars from the wreck. Between 1994 and 1996 the South African company Afrimar recovered more coins and artefacts, and from 1996 the Portuguese company Arqueonautas Worldwide S.A surveyed and recovered yet more artefacts from the wreck.
