= Edward Mellish (priest) =

Edward Mellish (b Blyth, Nottinghamshire 21 June 1766 – d East Tuddenham 11 December 1830) was an Anglican priest in the late 18th and early 19th centuries.

Mellish was educated at Eton College and Trinity College, Cambridge. He held livings at East Tuddenham, Honingham and Reymerston. He was Vicar of the combined livings of East Tuddenham and Honingam for 37 years until his death, which was the result of a fall from a horse. He was Dean of Hereford from 1827 until his death. He had two sons and a daughter.

His grandson was a notable British diplomat.

== Notes ==
Church of England titles
Preceded by Robert Carr	Dean of Hereford; 1827–1830	Succeeded by Edward Grey
