= Henry William Carr =

British Army soldier

Sir Henry William Carr KCB KTS
- Born: 6 October 1777; Twickenham, Middlesex, England
- Died: 10 August 1821 (aged 43); Romsey, Hampshire, England
- Burial place: Feltham, Middlesex, England
- Spouse(s): Ann Whitehorne Rose, Jane Perceval née Wilson
- Relatives: Robert James Carr, Sir James Lloyd, 1st Baronet
- Military career
- Allegiance: British Army
- Branch: United Kingdom
- Service years: 1793–1821
- Rank: Lieutenant-Colonel
- Unit: 83rd (County of Dublin) Regiment of Foot
- Conflicts: French Revolutionary Wars, Napoleonic Wars
- Awards: Knight Commander of the Order of the Bath, Order of the Tower and Sword

Sir Henry William Carr KCB (6 October 1777 – 10 August 1821) was a professional soldier in the British Army who, when peace came in 1814, married the widow of the assassinated prime minister Spencer Perceval.

== Early life ==
Born in Twickenham, where at the time his father ran a private school, he was the second son of the Reverend Colston Carr (1740–1822) and his wife Elizabeth Bullock (1747–1826). His elder brother was Robert James Carr, bishop of Chichester and of Worcester, while his eldest sister Elizabeth Anne Carr married Sir James Martin Lloyd Bt MP. Though his father intended him to join Coutts Bank, he chose the Army.

== Army career ==
Joining the newly raised 83rd Foot, Carr was posted to the West Indies where he saw action in the Second Maroon War in Jamaica and in Santo Domingo and was wounded, requiring long convalescence. In 1802 the regiment was recalled to the United Kingdom and the 2nd Battalion was not thrown into action again until 1809, when it was sent to Lisbon to counter the French invasion of Portugal. After fighting at the Second Battle of Porto and at the Battle of Talavera, in 1810 the 83rd were engaged at the Battle of Bussaco. Its commanding officer was then promoted to lead a Portuguese brigade and for the rest of the war the 2nd Battalion was led by the then Major Carr.

In 1811 the 83rd won further honours at the Battle of Fuentes de Oñoro and in the spring of 1812 the Anglo-Portuguese forces advanced into Spain. After capturing the frontier towns of Almeida and Ciudad Rodrigo, they surrounded the French in the heavily fortified town of Badajoz. In a daring night assault, a party led by Carr captured the town's castle, after which the French surrendered. For this achievement, he was promoted to Lieutenant-Colonel. The roads into Spain were now open and in July they encountered the French at the Battle of Salamanca. The 83rd were in the thick of the fighting, with Carr having his horse shot dead under him. Next year the advance continued towards the north coast ports and the French frontier. In June 1813 the French were overcome at the Battle of Vitoria. For his rôle there in leading the 83rd, Carr was one of two officers to be awarded a medal.

Having crossed into France, the 83rd were prominent at the Battle of Nivelle in November 1813 and then fought notably at the Gave d'Oloron. Their next major engagement was at the Battle of Orthez in February 1814, where Carr was wounded by a musket ball that grazed his jaw and lodged in his throat. He was never fully fit again. The French forces retreated and in April 1814 the 83rd fought their last battle of the war at Toulouse.

== Honours ==
On 2 January 1815, Carr was appointed a Knight Commander of the Order of the Bath and on 23 May 1815 he received royal permission to wear a foreign decoration, that of the highest Portuguese honour, the Order of the Tower and Sword, in which he had been made a Knight.

== Family ==
While stationed in Jamaica, in 1799 Henry married Ann Whitehorne Rose, widow of Edward Chambers and daughter of Major-General James Rose, who had two children. In 1801 they had a son together named Colston Rose Carr, whose fate is unknown. Ann left Henry for another man and died in childbirth.

On returning to his parents' home at Ealing after the end of the war in 1814, Henry met and in 1815 married Jane Wilson (1769–1844), attractive widow of the prime minister Spencer Perceval, who had an ample income, a large house and twelve children. However, unfit after 21 years' continuous active service and a severe wound, he died at the early age of 44 and was buried at Feltham, where his memorial is.
