= John Bellingham =

English merchant who assassinated Prime Minister Spencer Perceval in 1812

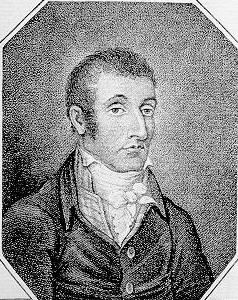
- Bellingham in the Newgate Calendar, 1812
- Born: c. 1769; St Neots, Huntingdonshire, England
- Died: 18 May 1812 (aged 42–43); London, England
- Resting place: Dissected, skull preserved at Barts Pathology Museum
- Citizenship: United Kingdom of Great Britain and Ireland
- Occupation: Merchant
- Spouse: Mary Neville (m. 1803)
- Status: Executed by hanging
- Motive: see Notes
- Conviction: Assassination of Spencer Perceval
- Criminal charges: Murder
- Penalty: Death by hanging

Notes
- Robinson (2013, p. 31): "The motive was Bellingham's groundless claim that the Crown owed him money for time he had served in a Russian prison while Perceval had been Chancellor of the Exchequer."

John Bellingham (c. 1769 – 18 May 1812) was an English merchant and perpetrator of the 1812 murder of Spencer Perceval, the only British prime minister to be assassinated.

== Early life ==
Bellingham's early life is largely unknown, and most post-assassination biographies included speculation as fact. Recollections of family and friends show that Bellingham was born in St Neots, Huntingdonshire, and brought up in London, where he was apprenticed to a jeweller, James Love, aged fourteen. Two years later, he went as a midshipman on the maiden voyage of the Hartwell from Gravesend to China. A mutiny took place on 22 May 1787, which led to the ship running aground and sinking off the coast of Africa.

In early 1794, a man named John Bellingham opened a tin factory on London's Oxford Street, but it failed and the owner was declared bankrupt in March. It is not certain this is the same person, but Bellingham definitely worked as a clerk in a counting house in the late 1790s, and about 1800 he went to Arkhangelsk, Russia, as an agent for importers and exporters. He returned to England in 1802 and was a merchant broker in Liverpool, living on Duke Street. He married Mary Neville in 1803. In the summer of 1804, Bellingham again went to Arkhangelsk to work as an export representative.

== Russian imprisonment ==
In autumn 1803, the Russian ship Soleure (or sometimes "Sojus"), insured at Lloyd's of London, was lost in the White Sea. Her owners (the house of R. Van Brienen) filed a claim on their insurance, but an anonymous letter told Lloyd's the ship had been sabotaged. Soloman Van Brienen believed Bellingham was the author, and retaliated by accusing him of a debt of 4,890 roubles to a bankruptcy of which he was an assignee. Bellingham, about to return from Russia to Britain on 16 November 1804, had his travelling pass withdrawn because of the alleged debt.

Van Brienen persuaded the local governor-general to imprison Bellingham, and he was placed in a Russian jail. One year later, Bellingham secured his release and went to Saint Petersburg, where he attempted to impeach the governor-general. This angered the Russian authorities, who charged him with leaving Arkhangelsk in a clandestine manner. He was again imprisoned until October 1808, when he was put out onto the streets, but still without permission to leave. In desperation, he petitioned the Tsar. He was allowed to leave Russia in 1809, arriving in England in December.

== Assassination of the prime minister ==
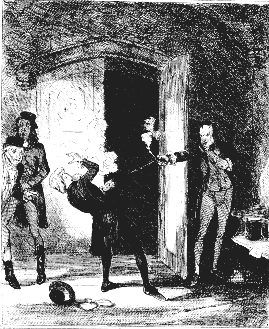
A 19th-century illustration of Bellingham's assassination of Spencer Perceval

Once home, Bellingham began petitioning the United Kingdom's government for compensation over his imprisonment. This was refused, as the United Kingdom had broken off diplomatic relations with Russia in November 1808. Bellingham's wife urged him to drop the matter and he did so reluctantly.

In 1812, Bellingham renewed his attempts to win compensation. On 18 April, he visited the Foreign Office where a civil servant told him he was at liberty to take whatever measures he thought proper. On 20 April, Bellingham purchased two .50 calibre (12.7 mm) pistols from a gunsmith of 58 Skinner Street. He also had a tailor sew an inside pocket to his coat. At this time, he was often seen in the lobby of the House of Commons.

After taking a friend's family to a painting exhibition on Monday 11 May 1812, Bellingham remarked that he had some business to attend to. He made his way to Parliament, where he waited in the lobby. When Prime Minister Spencer Perceval appeared, Bellingham stepped forward and shot him in the heart. He then calmly sat on a bench. Bellingham was immediately restrained and was identified by Isaac Gascoyne, his local MP for Liverpool.

== Trial, execution and legacy ==
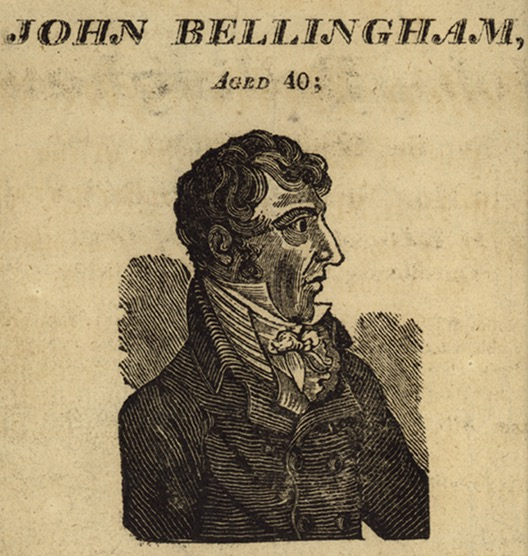
A contemporary engraving of John Bellingham

Bellingham was tried on Friday 15 May 1812 at the Old Bailey, where he argued that he would have preferred to shoot the British ambassador to Russia, but insisted as a wronged man he was justified in killing the representative of his oppressors.

He made a formal statement to the court, saying:

Recollect, Gentlemen, what was my situation. Recollect that my family was ruined and myself destroyed, merely because it was Mr Perceval's pleasure that justice should not be granted; sheltering himself behind the imagined security of his station, and trampling upon law and right in the belief that no retribution could reach him. I demand only my right, and not a favour; I demand what is the birthright and privilege of every Englishman.

Gentlemen, when a minister sets himself above the laws, as Mr Perceval did, he does it as his own personal risk. If this were not so, the mere will of the minister would become the law, and what would then become of your liberties?

I trust that this serious lesson will operate as a warning to all future ministers, and that they will henceforth do the thing that is right, for if the upper ranks of society are permitted to act wrong with impunity, the inferior ramifications will soon become wholly corrupted.

Gentlemen, my life is in your hands, I rely confidently in your justice.

Evidence was presented that Bellingham was insane, but it was discounted by the trial judge, Sir James Mansfield. Bellingham was found guilty, and was sentenced to death.

Bellingham was hanged in public three days later. René Martin Pillet, a Frenchman who wrote an account of his ten years in England, described the sentiment of the crowd at the execution:

Farewell poor man, you owe satisfaction to the offended laws of your country, but God bless you! You have rendered an important service to your country, you have taught ministers that they should do justice, and grant audience when it is asked of them.

A subscription was raised for the widow and children of Bellingham, and "their fortune was ten times greater than they could ever have expected in any other circumstances". His widow married James Raymond Barker of Fairford, Gloucestershire, at Thornton-in-Craven, North Yorkshire, the following year.

Bellingham's skull was preserved at Barts Pathology Museum.

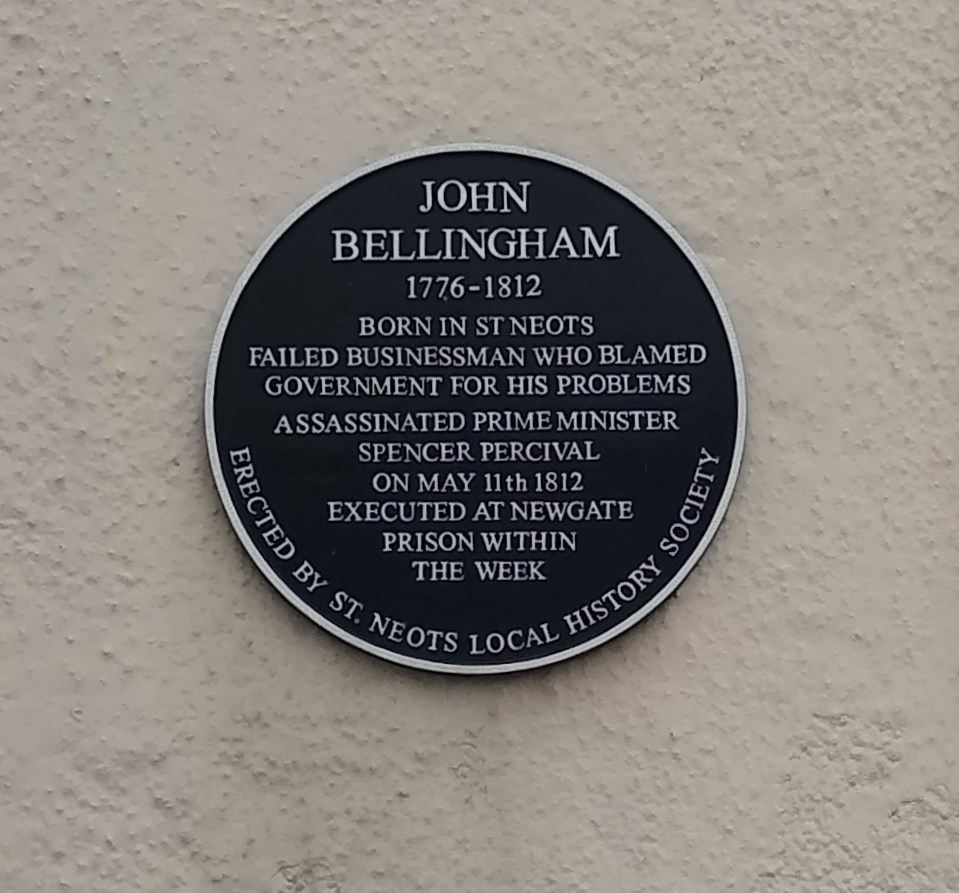
Commemorative plaque to John Bellingham

In September 2009, the St Neots Local History Society erected a plaque on Bellingham House in St Neots. The house, on the corner of Huntingdon Street and Cambridge Street, is said to be the birthplace of Bellingham.

== See also ==
- List of assassinations
