= Spencer George Perceval =

English amateur antiquary and geologist

Spencer George Perceval (8 July 1838 – 7 March 1922) was an English amateur antiquary, geologist, and benefactor to Cambridge University.

Spencer George Perceval was the second son of Ernest Augustus Perceval of Bridgwater and his cousin Beatrice Trevelyan, fourth daughter of Sir John Trevelyan, 4th Baronet. Perceval's paternal grandfather was the prime minister Spencer Perceval. He was educated at Radley College and Trinity Hall, Cambridge.

Perceval's antiquarian and geological interests drove him to extensive activity as a collector. Between 1852 and 1863 he made collections of Somerset minerals, which were deposited in the Museum of Somerset. He edited a travel journal of Joseph Banks relating a tour through Dorset and Somerset, and occasionally corresponded with periodicals on geological and antiquarian subjects.

Perceval left his property to the Fitzwilliam Museum of the University of Cambridge. His bequest included a collection of around 300 chapbooks, and a collection of eighteenth-century memorial jewellery. Perceval directed that the annual income from his property should be spent on objects of art and artefacts associated with pre-nineteenth-century Cambridge alumni.

== Writings ==
- 'Supplemenary Note on Minerals found in Somersetshire', Geological Magazine, 10:106 (April 1873), p. 166
- 'James Parkinson, the Author of "Organic Remains of a Former World"', Nature 51 (8 November 1984), pp. 31–2
