= Robert Carr (bishop) =

English churchman

Robert James Carr (1774–1841) was an English churchman, Bishop of Chichester in 1824 and Bishop of Worcester in 1831.

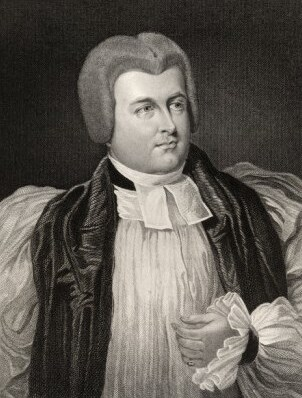
Engraving in bishop's robes

== Early life ==
Born 9 May 1774 and christened 9 June at Feltham, London he was the eldest son of the Reverend Colston Carr, at the time vicar of Feltham, and his wife Elizabeth, daughter of Thomas Bullock. His elder sister, Elizabeth Ann, married Sir James Lloyd Bt MP, and his younger brother was Lieutenant-Colonel Sir Henry William Carr KCB. His father, later vicar of Ealing, was chaplain first to the King's younger brother Prince William Henry, Duke of Gloucester and, after his death, to the King's younger son, Prince Edward, Duke of Kent and Strathearn.

He received his primary education at a school his father ran in Twickenham, before being sent to Merchant Taylors' School, London. From there he went up in 1792 to Worcester College, Oxford, gaining the degrees of BA in 1796, MA in 1806 and both BD and DD in 1820.

== Career ==
Following his father and grandfather into the Church of England, he was ordained priest in 1798 by the Bishop of Salisbury and held various appointments until 1804, when he became vicar of Brighton. A busy fishing port and holiday resort, it was where the Prince of Wales, the future King George IV, spent much time and a friendship began between the two men which lasted for life.

When the Prince became King in 1820, he was able to advance his friend, who was appointed Deputy Clerk of the Closet, Dean and Canon of Hereford and Canon of Salisbury Cathedral and of Chichester Cathedral. Four years later he was consecrated bishop of Chichester, giving up his posts at Brighton and Salisbury. In 1827 he was promoted to Clerk of the Closet and in 1828 was made a canon of St Paul's Cathedral, giving up his posts at Hereford.

In the House of Lords, he was one of the bishops who voted against the Roman Catholic Relief Bill in 1829 and, while not speaking against the measure, opposed it in other ways. During the King's last illness, he was in constant attendance at Windsor Castle and was able to help with two matters on the king's conscience: his estrangement from his brother, the Duke of Sussex, and the possible breach of his coronation oath in allowing Catholic emancipation.

In 1831 the new king, William IV, promoted him to the bishopric of Worcester, in fulfilment, as it was understood at the time, of a promise made by the late king. He then gave up his post at St Paul's, being succeeded by Sydney Smith. When the House of Lords voted on the Reform Bill in 1832 he abstained. After the death of the king in 1837, he was replaced as Clerk of the Closet and had no further influence at court. He was elected a Fellow of the Royal Society in 1831.

He died on 24 April 1841, aged 67, in The Old Palace, Worcester and was buried on 3 May beside his wife in Hartlebury churchyard. His only published works were sermons preached for charitable purposes.

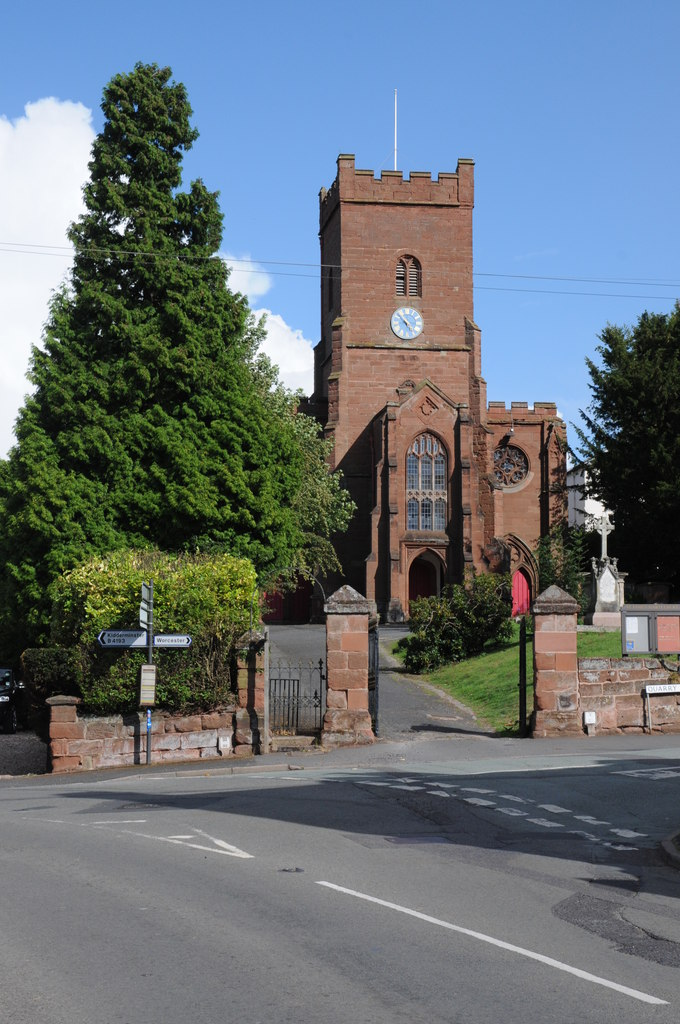
Hartlebury church

== Family ==
In 1797 at Twickenham he married Nancy (1774–1841), youngest daughter of John Wilkinson, a wealthy businessman who lived at Roehampton, and his wife Sibella Berdoe. They had nine children, of whom only four survived:

- Maria (1801–1888), who in 1842 married the Worcester solicitor and MP William Laslett. They separated shortly after, without children, and the unhappy episode was fictionalised in the 1861 novel East Lynne.
- Sybella Jane (1802–1879), who married the Sussex landowner Charles Peckham Peckham and had eight children. Her granddaughter Sibylla Wallace married the zoologist Stanley Smyth Flower.
- Elizabeth Lloyd (1804–1885), who married the Reverend Thomas Baker, a first cousin of Fanny Brawne. He was chaplain to her father at Chichester and later rector of Hartlebury. They had nine children, a great-grandson being Air Marshal Sir John Baker-Carr.
- George Kirwan (1810–1877), who changed his surname to Carr Lloyd and became a Sussex landowner.

Church of England titles
Preceded by George Grelton	Dean of Hereford; 1820–1827	Succeeded by Edward Mellish
Preceded by John Buckner	Bishop of Chichester; 1824–1831	Succeeded by Edward Maltby
Preceded by Folliott Herbert Walker Cornewall	Bishop of Worcester; 1831–1841	Succeeded by Henry Pepys
