= Lindsey House, Lincoln's Inn Fields =

Building in Lincoln's Inn Fields, London

Coordinates: 51°30′57″N 0°07′06″W

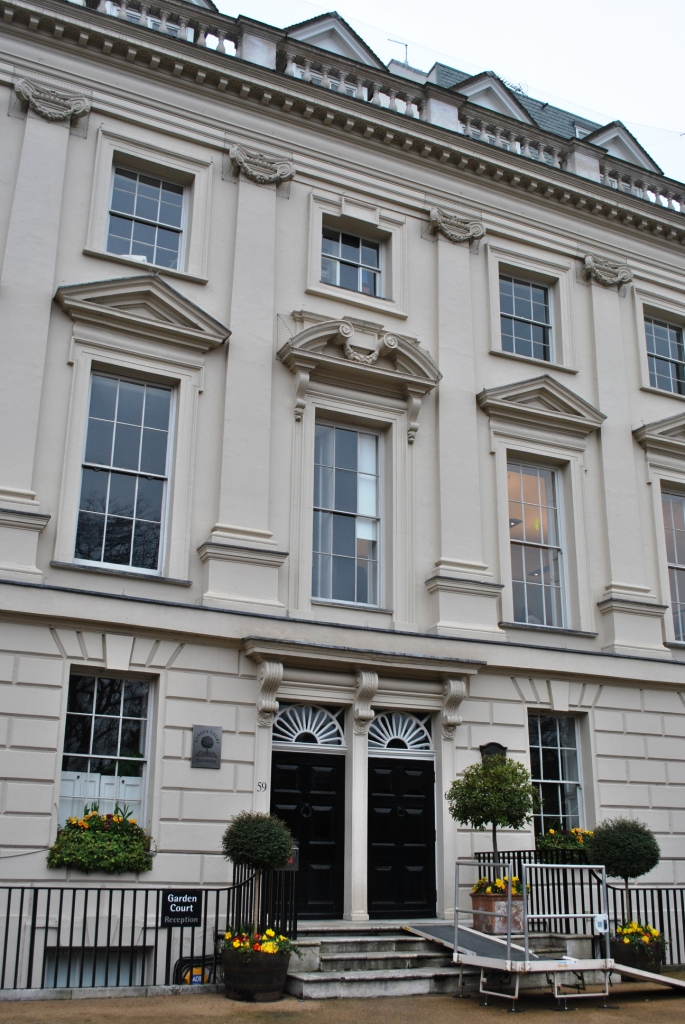
Lindsey House

Lindsey House is a Grade I listed building in Lincoln's Inn Fields, London. Attributed to architect Inigo Jones.

It was built in 1638–41, with alterations by Isaac Ware in 1751–52 to form two houses. Lindsey House has been a listed building since 1951.
