= Maurice FitzGerald, 14th Knight of Kerry =

Irish hereditary knight (died 1729)

Maurice FitzGerald
- Hereditary knight
- Tenure: c. 1680 – 1729
- Successor: John, 15th Knight of Kerry
- Died: 9 December 1729
- Spouse: Elizabeth Crosbie
- Issue Detail: John, Robert & others
- Father: John, 13th Knight of Kerry
- Mother: Honora O'Brien

Sir Maurice FitzGerald, 14th Knight of Kerry (died 1729) fought for James II in the Williamite War in Ireland, but after the defeat he conformed to the established religion by joining the Church of Ireland. He became Deputy Lieutenant of Kerry.

== Birth and origins ==
Maurice was the eldest son of Sir John FitzGerald and his wife Honora O'Brien. His father was the 13th Knight of Kerry. His mother was the third daughter of Connor O'Brien, 2nd Viscount Clare. Both parents were Roman Catholic. He was one of four brothers.

Family tree

Maurice FitzGerald with wife, parents, and other selected relatives.

John; 12th Knight fl. 1640	Katherine; FitzGerald
Thomas d. 1667 d.v.p.*	Jane; Everard	Connor; 2nd Viscount; Clare; 1605–1670
John; 13th Knight d. c. 1680	Honora; O'Brien
Maurice; 14th Knight d. 1729	Elizabeth; Crosbie
John; 15th Knight; 1706–1741	Margaret; Deane	Robert; 17th Knight; 1717–1781	Katherine; Sandes
Maurice; 16th Knight; 1734–1779	Anne; FitzGerald	Maurice; 18th Knight; 1774–1849	Maria; La Touche
Peter; 1st Baronet; Valencia; 1808–1880

Legend

XXX	Subject of the article	XXX	Knights of Kerry	XXX	Baronets; Valentia	XXX	Viscounts; Clare

*d.v.p. = predeceased his father (decessit vita patris)

== Williamite War ==
FitzGerald fought for James II in the Williamite War in Ireland (1688–1691) alongside his brothers John, Daniel of Ballyruddery, and Thomas of Ardglass.

== Marriage and children ==
On 30 June 1703 FitzGerald married Elizabeth, second daughter of David Crosbie (died 1717), of Ardfert Abbey, High Sheriff of County Kerry, by his wife Jane Hamilton, daughter of William Hamilton of Liscloony, County Offaly. His wife was a Protestant and the sister of Maurice Crosbie, 1st Baron Brandon.

Maurice and Elizabeth had three sons of whom:

1. John (1706–1741), his immediate successor
2. Robert (1717–1781), who succeeded as the 17th knight

—and nine daughters, known as the "Nine Geraldines", of whom:

1. Jane, married George Herbert, Esquire of Currans
2. Honora, married Richard Meredyth, Esquire of Dicksgrove (near Currans)
3. Bridget married first Thomas Sandes and secondly Mr. Creagh
4. Margaret, married John Hewson of Ennismore

== Later life and death ==
Their children were raised as Protestants. Their daughters married into the Herberts (twice), Merediths (twice), Sandes', Creaghs, Stacks, Hewsons, Collis', Rices and Days.

In 1708 FitzGerald conformed to the established religion. His marriage, conversion, and the subsequent marriages of his children further alienated the Knights of Kerry from the local Catholic populace. FitzGerald became Deputy Lieutenant of Kerry.

FitzGerald died at Ballinruddery Castle, near Listowel, on 9 December 1729.

== Notes and references ==
=== Sources ===
- Burke, Sir Bernard (1879). A Genealogical and Heraldic History of the Landed Gentry of Great Britain and Ireland. Vol. I (6th ed.). London: Harrison. OCLC 972909415. – A to KYR (for FitzGerald, the Knight of Kerry)
- Burke, Bernard (1883). A Genealogical History of the Dormant, Abeyant, Forfeited and Extinct Peerages of the British Empire (New ed.). London: Harrison. OCLC 499232768.
- Hickson, Mary Agnes (1872). Selections from old Kerry Records. London: Watson & Hazell. OCLC 1084939992.
- MacCotter, Paul (2016). "The earlier Geraldine Knights of Kerry". Journal of the Kerry Archeological and Historical Society. 2. 16: 5–36.
