= Maurice Fitzgerald =

Maurice Fitzgerald or FitzGerald may refer to:

- Maurice Fitzgerald (Gaelic footballer) (born 1969), Kerry Gaelic footballer who played from 1988 to 2001
- Maurice Fitzgerald (rugby league) (1917–1942), Australian rugby league footballer
- Maurice Fitzgerald (rugby union) (born 1976), English rugby union player
- Maurice A. FitzGerald (1897–1951), politician from New York City and borough president of Queens

== Individuals with titles ==
- Maurice FitzGerald, Lord of Llanstephan (c. 1105–1176), major figure in the Norman conquest of Ireland
- Maurice FitzGerald, 2nd Lord of Offaly (1194–1257), Lord Chief Justice of Ireland, founder of Sligo Abbey
- Maurice FitzGerald, 3rd Lord of Offaly (1238–1286), soldier and Justiciar of Ireland from 1272 to 1273

=== Earls of Desmond ===
- Maurice FitzGerald, 1st Earl of Desmond (died 1356), Irish soldier and peer
- Maurice FitzGerald, 2nd Earl of Desmond (died 1358)
- Maurice FitzGerald, 9th Earl of Desmond (died 1520)

=== Earl of Kildare ===
- Maurice FitzGerald, 4th Earl of Kildare (1318–1390)

=== Knights of Kerry ===
- Maurice FitzGerald, 14th Knight of Kerry
- Maurice FitzGerald, 16th Knight of Kerry (c. 1734–1779), Irish MP for Dingle
- Maurice FitzGerald, 18th Knight of Kerry (1774–1849), Irish landowner and Whig MP for Kerry and Tralee
- Sir Maurice FitzGerald, 2nd Baronet (1844–1916), also styled as the 20th Knight of Kerry, Irish nobleman, landowner, and soldier

=== Dukes of Leinster ===
- Maurice FitzGerald, 6th Duke of Leinster (1887–1922), Irish peer
- Maurice FitzGerald, 9th Duke of Leinster (born 1948), Irish peer
