= FitzGerald baronets of Valentia (1880) =

Baronetcy in Ireland

Escutcheon of the FitzGerald baronets of Valentia

The FitzGerald baronetcy, of Valentia in the County of Kerry, was created in the Baronetage of the United Kingdom on 8 July 1880 for Sir Peter George Fitzgerald, 19th Knight of Kerry.

== FitzGerald baronets, of Valentia (1880) ==
- Sir Peter George Fitzgerald, 1st Baronet of Valentia, 19th Knight of Kerry (1808–1880)
- Sir Maurice Fitzgerald, 2nd Baronet of Valentia, 20th Knight of Kerry (1844–1916)
- Sir John Peter Gerald Maurice Fitzgerald, 3rd Baronet of Valentia, 21st Knight of Kerry (1884–1957)
- Sir Arthur Henry Brinsley Fitzgerald, 4th Baronet of Valentia, 22nd Knight of Kerry (1885–1967)
- Sir George Peter Maurice Fitzgerald, 5th Baronet of Valentia, 23rd Knight of Kerry (1917–2001)
- Sir Adrian James Andrew Denis Fitzgerald, 6th Baronet, 24th Knight of Kerry (born 1940)

The heir presumptive is Anthony Desmond Fitzgerald (born 1953), a cousin of the present holder.

== Notes ==
Baronetage of the United Kingdom
Preceded by Bates baronets	FitzGerald baronets of Valentia; 8 July 1880	Succeeded by Roberts baronets
