= Bates baronets =

Set index for Bates baronets

There have been two baronetcies created for persons with the surname Bates, both in the Baronetage of the United Kingdom. As of 2026 both creations are extant.

- Bates baronets of Bellefield (1880)
- Bates baronets of Magherabuoy (1937)
