= Richard Townsend (politician) =

Irish politician

Richard Townsend (c. 1731 – 12 December 1783) was an Irish politician.

He was the oldest son of Richard Townsend, son of Bryan Townsend, and his second wife Elizabeth Beecher, daughter of Henry Beecher and granddaughter of Thomas Beecher. His younger brother was John Townsend. Townsend served as colonel of the Cork Militia and was appointed High Sheriff of County Cork in 1753. He entered the Irish House of Commons for County Cork in 1759 and represented the constituency until his death in 1783. In 1776, he was also elected for Dingle, however chose not to sit.

In October 1752, he married Elizabeth FitzGerald, daughter of John FitzGerald, 15th Knight of Kerry. They had a daughter and a son Richard Boyle Townsend.

Parliament of Ireland
Preceded by Charles Boyle, Viscount Dungarvan; Arthur Hyde	Member of Parliament for County Cork; 1759–1783; With: Arthur Hyde 1759–1761; Richard Boyle, Viscount Boyle 1761–1765; Hon. John Lysaght 1765–1768; John Hyde 1768–1776; Sir Robert Deane, 6th Bt 1776–1781; James Bernard 1781–1783	Succeeded by Robert King, Viscount Kingsborough; James Bernard
Preceded by Robert FitzGerald; Maurice FitzGerald	Member of Parliament for Dingle; 1776–1777; With: Robert FitzGerald	Succeeded by Robert FitzGerald; Robert Alexander
