= Maurice FitzThomas FitzGerald =

Maurice FitzThomas FitzGerald may refer to:

- Maurice FitzThomas FitzGerald, 1st Earl of Desmond (died 1356), Irish nobleman, Captain of Desmond Castle, so-called ruler of Munster; briefly, Lord Justice of Ireland
- Maurice FitzThomas FitzGerald, 4th Earl of Kildare (died 1390), Irish nobleman and Lord Justice of Ireland

== See also ==
- Maurice Fitzgerald (disambiguation)
