= Adrian FitzGerald =

UK Conservative Party politician (born 1940)

Sir Adrian James Andrew Denis FitzGerald, 6th Baronet of Valentia, 24th Knight of Kerry (born 24 June 1940) is a Conservative Party politician in the UK and former Mayor of the Royal Borough of Kensington and Chelsea. He is the current "Green" Knight of Kerry, and thus has been the only holder of an active Irish hereditary knighthood since the 2011 death of his distant cousin Desmond FitzGerald, 29th Knight of Glin. The title has no official recognition in Ireland, which has been a republic since 18 April 1949 when the Republic of Ireland Act 1948 came into effect.

== Family ==
Adrian FitzGerald is the eldest son and heir of Sir George FitzGerald M.C., 5th Baronet, 23rd Knight of Kerry, by his wife Angela (Lady FitzGerald), daughter of Captain James Rankin Mitchell, of Mayfair, Adrian was educated at Harrow School.

== Career ==
A founder-member (1962) of the Conservative Monday Club, he was firstly editor of their Newsletter, and from 1967–74 editor of their glossy magazine, Monday World. He has served as an elected Councillor of the Royal Borough of Kensington and Chelsea in London from 1974 until his retirement in 2002, as Mayor (1984–85), and as Chairman of their Education and Libraries Committees from 1995. In 1989-90 he was Deputy Leader of the London Fire and Civil Defence Authority.

== Other interests ==
Sir Adrian has also served as Chairman of the Anglo-Polish Society for 1989–92, and is currently its president. He is vice chairman of the London chapter of the Irish Georgian Society and a patron of the Save Sloane Square campaign and the anti-euthanasia organisation Alert.

Sir Adrian is a Knight of Malta, and was President of the Irish Association of the Sovereign Military Order of Malta (SMOM) resigning in May 2015. He divides his time between his homes in South Kensington, London, and Cappoquin, County Waterford, Ireland.

== Ancestry ==
Ancestors of Adrian FitzGerald

16. Sir Peter FitzGerald, 19th Knight of Kerry
8. Sir Maurice FitzGerald, 20th Knight of Kerry
17. Julia Hussey
4. Sir Arthur FitzGerald, 22nd Knight of Kerry
18. Henri Bischoffsheim
9. Amélie Bischoffsheim
19. Clarissa Biedermann
2. Sir George FitzGerald, 23rd Knight of Kerry
20. William Forester
10. Francis Forester
21. Hon. Eleanor Fraser
5. Mary Forester
22. Sir Powlett Milbank, 2nd Baronet
11. Aline Milbank
23. Edith Green-Price
1. Sir Adrian FitzGerald, 24th Knight of Kerry
6. James Mitchell
3. Angela Mitchell

Titles of nobility (Ireland)
Preceded by George Fitzgerald	Knight of Kerry; 2001–present	Incumbent
Baronetage of the United Kingdom
Preceded by George Fitzgerald	Baronet (of Valencia); 2001–present	Incumbent
