= Richard Boyle Townsend =

Irish politician

Richard Boyle Townsend (1756 – 26 November 1826) was an Irish politician.

He was the only son of Richard Townsend and his wife Elizabeth FitzGerald, daughter of John FitzGerald, 15th Knight of Kerry. His uncles were Maurice FitzGerald, 16th Knight of Kerry and John Townsend. Townsend entered the Irish House of Commons in 1782 and sat for Dingle until he resigned his seat in 1795. He was appointed High Sheriff of County Cork for 1785.

On 16 May 1784, he married Henrietta Newenham, daughter of John Newenham, and by her he had eight sons and a daughter.

Parliament of Ireland
Preceded by Robert FitzGerald; Robert Alexander	Member of Parliament for Dingle; 1782–1795; With: Robert Alexander 1782–1783; Hayes St Leger 1783; John Townsend 1783–1795	Succeeded by John Townsend; Bartholomew Hoare
