= Charles Perceval, 2nd Baron Arden =

British politician (1756–1840)

The Right Honourable The Lord Arden PC, FRS

Master of the Mint
- In office 1801–1802
- Monarch: George III
- Prime Minister: Henry Addington
- Preceded by: Lord Hawkesbury
- Succeeded by: The Earl Bathurst

Personal details
- Born: 1 October 1756 Charlton, Kent
- Died: 5 July 1840 (aged 83) St James's Place, London
- Spouse: Margaretta Wilson
- Parent(s): John Perceval (father); Catherine Compton (mother)
- Education: Trinity College, Cambridge

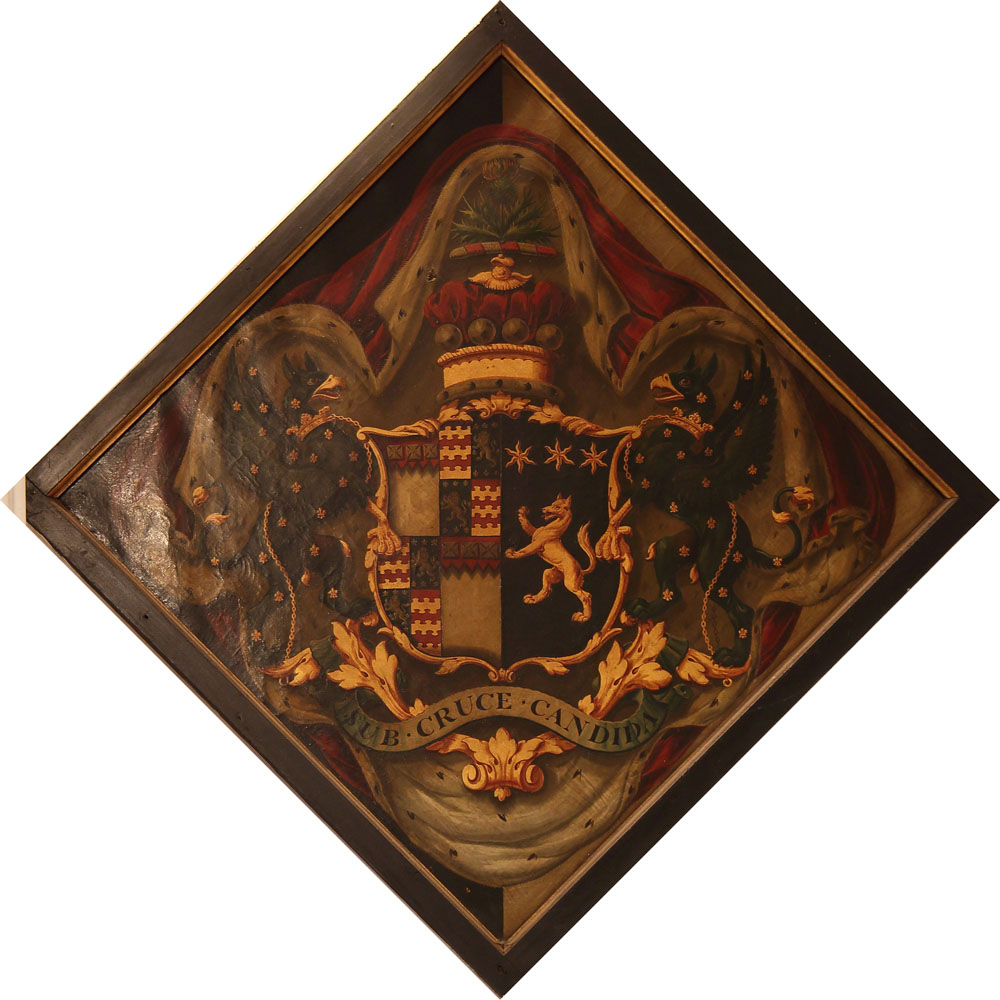
Lord Arden's funeral hatchment in St Luke's Church, Charlton. Above the shield is a baron's coronet. The fact that the hatchment is black on the left only indicates that his wife survived him.

Charles George Perceval, 2nd Baron Arden PC FRS (1 October 1756 – 5 July 1840) was a British politician.

== Background and education ==
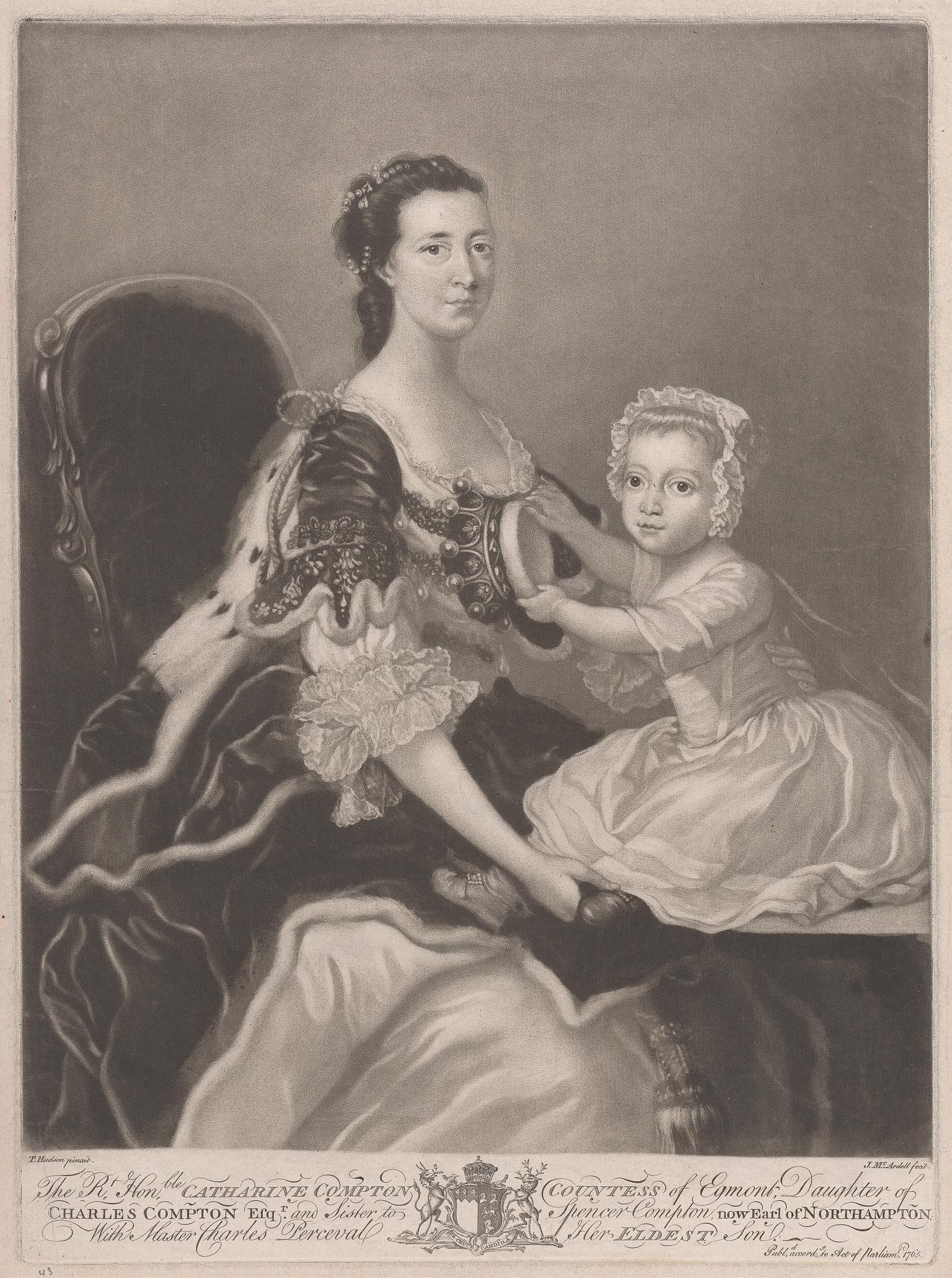
Catherine Compton, Countess of Egmont, with her eldest son Charles Perceval, mezzotint print by James MacArdell after Thomas Hudson, 1765

Charles George Perceval was born at Charlton, Kent, the son of John Perceval, 2nd Earl of Egmont, and his second wife Catherine, 1st Baroness Arden, daughter of Charles Compton. Prime Minister Spencer Perceval was his younger brother.

He was educated at Harrow and Trinity College, Cambridge.

== Political career ==
Arden sat as Member of Parliament for Launceston from 1780 to 1790, for Warwick from 1790 to 1796 and for Totnes from 1796 to 1802. He had succeeded his mother as second Baron Arden in 1784. However, as this was an Irish peerage it did not prevent him sitting in the House of Commons.

He served as Master of the Mint between 1801 and 1802 and as a Commissioner of the India Board between 1801 and 1803. In 1801 he was admitted to the Privy Council. In 1802 he was created Baron Arden, of Arden in the County of Warwick, in the Peerage of the United Kingdom, and was then obliged to enter the upper chamber of parliament. He was also a Lord of the Bedchamber between 1804 and 1812, Registrar of the Court of Admiralty between 1790 and 1840 and served as Lord Lieutenant of Surrey between 1830 and 1840. As Registrar of the Court of Admiralty, he was a sinecurist, having waited 26 years for the office through reversion; the actual work was performed by a deputy registrar.

== Family ==
Lord Arden married Margaretta Elizabeth, daughter of General Sir Thomas Spencer Wilson, 6th Baronet, in 1787. They had six sons and two daughters. He died at St James's Place, London, in July 1840, aged 83, and was succeeded by his third but eldest surviving son, George, who also succeeded in the earldom of Egmont the following year. Lady Arden died in May 1851, aged 83.

Parliament of Great Britain
Preceded by Viscount Cranborne; Thomas Bowlby	Member of Parliament for Launceston; 1780–1790; With: Thomas Bowlby 1780–1783; Sir John Jervis 1783–1784; George Rose 1784–1788; Sir John Swinburne, Bt 1788–1790	Succeeded by John Rodney; Sir Henry Clinton
Preceded by Charles Francis Greville; Robert Ladbroke	Member of Parliament for Warwick; 1790–1796; With: Henry Gage 1790–1791; George Villiers 1791–1796	Succeeded by George Villiers; Samuel Robert Gaussen
Preceded by William Powlett Powlett; Francis Buller-Yarde	Member of Parliament for Totnes; 1796–1801; With: Lord George Seymour-Conway	Succeeded by Parliament of the United Kingdom
Parliament of the United Kingdom
Preceded by Parliament of Great Britain	Member of Parliament for Totnes; 1801–1802; With: Lord George Seymour-Conway 1801; William Adams 1801–1802	Succeeded by John Berkeley Burland; William Adams
Political offices
Preceded by Lord Hawkesbury	Master of the Mint; 1801–1802	Succeeded by The Earl Bathurst
Honorary titles
Preceded by The Viscount Midleton	Lord Lieutenant of Surrey; 1830–1840	Succeeded by The Earl of Lovelace
Peerage of Ireland
Preceded by Catherine Perceval	Baron Arden; 1st creation 1784–1840	Succeeded by George James Perceval
Peerage of the United Kingdom
New creation	Baron Arden; 2nd creation 1802–1840	Succeeded by George James Perceval
