= Sir William Fownes, 2nd Baronet =

Sir William Fownes, 2nd Baronet (1709 – 5 June 1778) was an Anglo-Irish politician, and abusive guardian to Sarah Ponsonby, one of the Ladies of Llangollen.

Fownes was the son of Sir William Fownes, 1st Baronet, and in 1735 he inherited his father's baronetcy. Fownes was the Member of Parliament for Dingle in the Irish House of Commons between 1749 and 1760, before representing Knocktopher from 1761 to 1776. Fownes was admitted to the Irish Privy Council in 1761. He finally represented the borough of Wicklow between 1776 and his death in 1778.

In 1739, William married Lady Elizabeth Ponsonby. His granddaughter was the artist Marianne-Caroline Hamilton via his daughter and only child Sarah Tighe (née Fownes).

Sarah Ponsonby (1755–1831), stayed with the Fownes after she was orphaned by the death of her father Chambre Brabazon Ponsonby, and attended school in Kilkenny. She became friendly with Eleanor Butler (1739–1829) and on 30 March 1778 they tried to flee together, Butler to escape her family and Ponsonby to avoid the unwanted attentions of Sir William, her guardian. Although the women were apprehended by their families, Eleanor escaped her family and secretly stayed in Sarah's room in Fownes' house, with food smuggled in by Mary Carryl, one of the household servants. The women were eventually able to leave their difficult domestic situation and moved to North Wales where they became known as the Ladies of Llangollen.

Parliament of Ireland
Preceded by Hon. John Perceval; Robert FitzGerald	Member of Parliament for Dingle; 1749–1760; With: Robert FitzGerald	Succeeded by Maurice FitzGerald; Robert FitzGerald
Preceded by Benjamin Burton; Richard Ponsonby	Member of Parliament for Knocktopher; 1761–1776; With: Hercules Langrishe	Succeeded by Andrew Caldwell; Hercules Langrishe
Preceded by Edward Tighe; John Talbot Dillon	Member of Parliament for Wicklow; 1776–1778; With: Edward Tighe (1776–1777); Hon. Robert Ward (1777–1778)	Succeeded by Hon. Robert Ward; George Ponsonby
Baronetage of Ireland
Preceded by William Fownes	Baronet (of Dublin); 1735–1778	Extinct
