= Catherine Compton =

English noblewoman (1731–1784)

The Right Honourable Catherine Compton Countess of Egmont
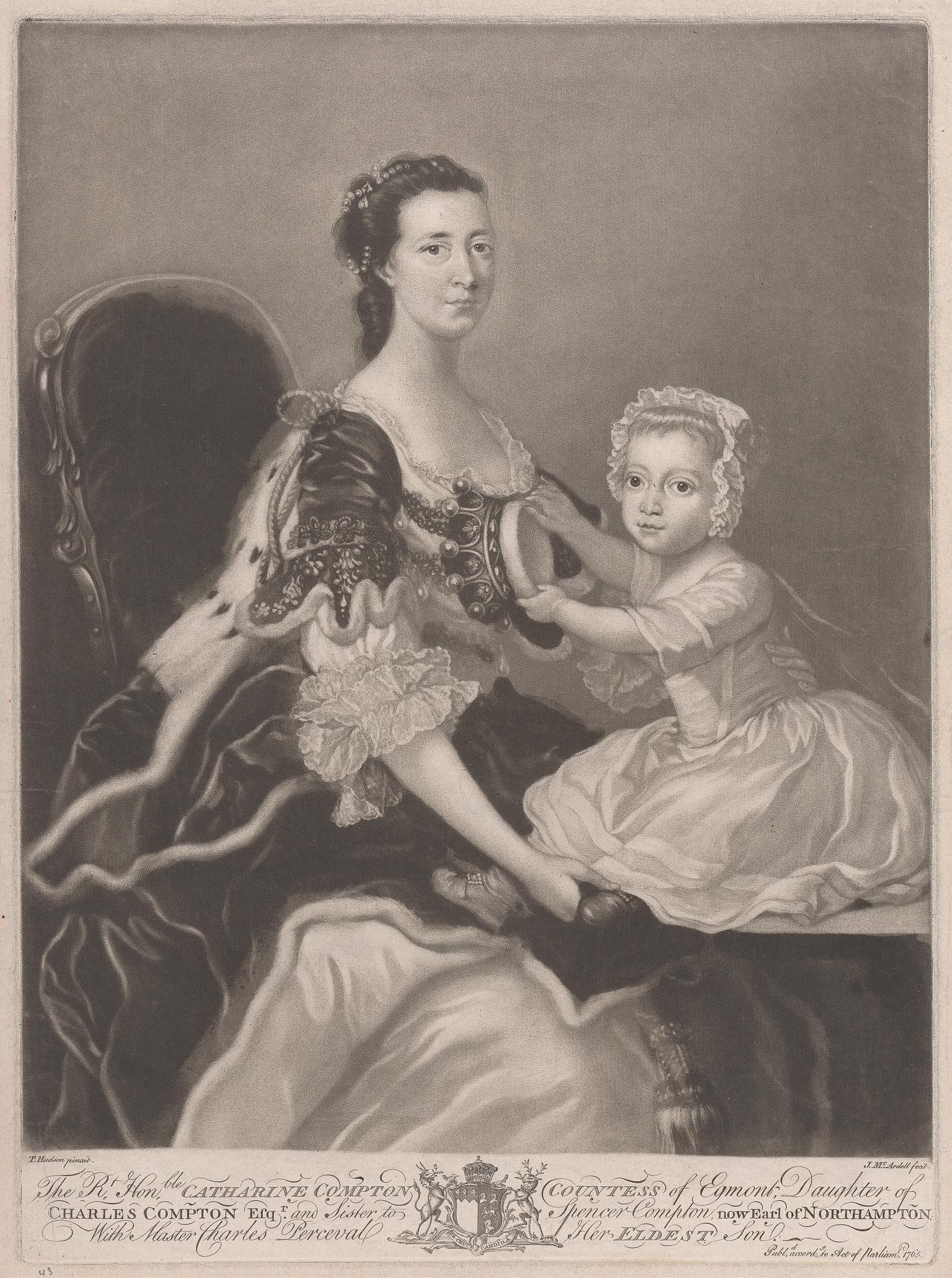
- Catherine Compton and her eldest son Charles
- Born: 4 June 1731
- Died: 11 June 1784 (aged 53)
- Spouse: John Perceval, 2nd Earl of Egmont
- Issue Detail: 9 (including Charles & Spencer)
- Father: Charles Compton
- Mother: Mary Lucy

Catherine Perceval, Baroness Arden (née Compton; 4 June 1731 – 11 June 1784) was an English noblewoman. She was the Countess of Egmont as the wife of John Perceval, 2nd Earl of Egmont and the mother of prime minister Spencer Perceval, who served from 1809 to 1812.

== Biography ==
Catherine Compton was the youngest daughter of the Member of Parliament (MP) Charles Compton and his wife Mary Lucy. Her son the future prime minister was named after her great uncle Spencer Compton, 1st Earl of Wilmington, who also served as prime minister from 1742 to 1743.

== Issue ==
On 26 January 1756 she married John Perceval, 2nd Earl of Egmont, becoming his second wife, and they had three sons and six daughters:

- Charles George Perceval (1756–1840), eldest son, who succeeded his mother as Baron Arden in the peerage of Ireland, and was created a peer of the United Kingdom, with the title of Baron Arden of Arden in Warwickshire
- Mary Perceval (d. 1839), who married Andrew Berkeley Drummond of Cadlands, Hampshire, a grandson of William Drummond, 4th Viscount Strathallan (died 1746), in 1781.
- Anne Perceval (15 December 1759 – 1 August 1772).
- Charlotte Perceval (b. 31 January 1761, d. 1761), who died an infant.
- Spencer Perceval (1762–1812), who served as Prime Minister of the United Kingdom from October 1809 to May 1812.
- Elizabeth Perceval (d. 1846), who died aged 82, unmarried.
- Henry Perceval (1765–1772), who died aged 7.
- Frances Perceval (b. 4 December 1767, d. 1817), who married John, 1st Baron Redesdale in 1803.
- Margaret Perceval (b. 17 March 1769, d. 1854), who married Thomas Walpole (son of Thomas Walpole), sometime ambassador at Munich, a nephew of Horatio Walpole, 1st Earl of Orford, in 1803.
