= Dingle (Parliament of Ireland constituency) =

Pre-1801 Irish constituency

- Former borough constituency for the Irish House of Commons
- County: County Kerry
- Borough: Dingle

1607–1801
- Seats: 2
- Replaced by: Disfranchised

Dingle was a constituency represented in the Irish House of Commons until its abolition on 1 January 1801.

== Boundaries and Boundary Changes ==
This constituency was based in the town of Dingle in County Kerry.

== History ==
It was incorporated by charter in 1607 with a Provost, 12 Burgesses and 150 freemen two resident. It had a corporation, and the electorate consisted of 13 burgesses and 150 freemen. In the Patriot Parliament of 1689 summoned by James II, Dingle was represented with two members. Following the Acts of Union 1800 the borough was disenfranchised.

== Members of Parliament, 1585–1801 ==
- 1585 Thomas Trant and James Trant
- 1613–1615 Thomas Trant FitzRichard and Michael Hussey
- 1634–1635 Dominick Rice and James Rice
- 1639–1649 Sir George Blundell, 2nd Baronet and Christopher Roper
- 1661–1666 Launcelot Sandes and Samuel Bathurst (Bathurst sat for Sligo - replaced 1661 by Robert Fowkes)

=== 1689–1801 ===
Election	First MP	Second MP
1689	Edward Rice FitzJames	John Hussey
1692	William FitzMaurice	Frederick William Mullins
1695	William FitzMaurice	John Blennerhassett
1703	William FitzMaurice	Francis Brewster
1713	Thomas Crosbie	John Pratt
1727	Thomas Crosbie	Sir Maurice Crosbie (Note: Also elected for County Kerry in 1727, for which he chose to sit)
1728	Thomas Crosbie	John FitzGerald
1731	Hon. John Perceval (Note: Styled as Viscount Perceval from 1733)	John FitzGerald
1741	Hon. John Perceval	Robert FitzGerald
1749	Sir William Fownes, 2nd Bt	Robert FitzGerald
1761	Maurice FitzGerald	Robert FitzGerald
1776	Richard Townsend (Note: Also elected for County Cork in 1776, for which he chose to sit)	Robert FitzGerald
1777	Robert Alexander	Robert FitzGerald
1782	Robert Alexander	Richard Boyle Townsend
1783	Hayes St Leger (Note: Also elected for Doneraile in 1783, for which he chose to sit)	Richard Boyle Townsend
1783	John Townsend	Richard Boyle Townsend
1795	John Townsend	Bartholomew Hoare
1798	Lodge Evans Morres	Sir James Cotter, 2nd Bt (Note: Also elected for Castlemartyr in 1798, for which he chose to sit)
1798	Lodge Evans Morres	William Thomas Monsell
1800	Lodge Evans Morres	Hon. William Townsend Mullins
1801	Disenfranchised	

== Bibliography ==
- O'Hart, John (2007). The Irish and Anglo-Irish Landed Gentry: When Cromwell came to Ireland. Vol. II. Heritage Books. ISBN 0-7884-1927-7.
- Johnston-Liik, E. M. (2002). History of the Irish Parliament, 1692–1800, Publisher: Ulster Historical Foundation (28 February 2002), ISBN 1-903688-09-4, History of the Irish Parliament Online - Ulster Historical Foundation
- T. W. Moody, F. X. Martin, F. J. Byrne, A New History of Ireland 1534–1691, Oxford University Press, 1978
- Leigh Rayment's historical List of Members of the Irish House of Commons. Cites: Johnston-Liik, Edith Mary (2002). The History of the Irish Parliament 1692-1800 (6 volumes). Ulster Historical Foundation.
