= John Townsend (Irish politician) =

Irish politician, born 1737

John Townsend (1737 – 4 August 1810) was an Irish politician.

He was the third son of Richard Townsend, son of Bryan Townsend, and his second wife Elizabeth Beecher, daughter of Henry Beecher and granddaughter of Thomas Beecher. In 1783, Townsend entered the Irish House of Commons for Dingle, the same constituency his brother Richard Townsend had also represented, and sat for it until 1797. In the following year he was elected for Doneraile and Castlemartyr (Parliament of Ireland constituency), representing the latter until the Act of Union in 1801.

In 1769, he married Mary Morris, daughter of Jonas Morris. They had four daughters and four sons.

Parliament of Ireland
Preceded by Hayes St Leger; Richard Boyle Townsend	Member of Parliament for Dingle; 1783–1797; With: Richard Boyle Townsend 1783; Bartholomew Hoare 1783–1797	Succeeded by Lodge Evans Morres; Sir James Cotter, 2nd Bt
Preceded by John Maxwell; James Chatterton	Member of Parliament for Doneraile; 1798; With: Peter Holmes	Succeeded by Peter Holmes; Barry Boyle St Leger
Preceded by Sir James Cotter, 2nd Bt; John Hobson	Member of Parliament for Castlemartyr; 1798 – 1801; With: Sir James Cotter, 2nd Bt	Succeeded by Parliament of the United Kingdom
