= Sir George FitzGerald, 23rd Knight of Kerry =

Irish knight and soldier (1917–2001)

Major Sir George Peter Maurice FitzGerald, 5th Baronet, 23rd Knight of Kerry (27 February 1917 – 6 April 2001) was a hereditary knight and British soldier. He was the son of Sir Arthur Henry Brinsley FitzGerald and Mary Eleanor Forester. He was educated at Harrow School and at Sandhurst. He fought in the Palestine Campaign in 1939, where he was mentioned in despatches. He fought in the Second World War and was decorated with the award of Military Cross (MC) in 1944. He retired from the military in 1948, with the rank of major, late of the Irish Guards.

He succeeded to the titles of 23rd Knight of Kerry and 5th Baronet of Valentia on 30 November 1967 on the death of his father, the 22nd Knight and 4th Baronet. In 1969, he stood in the Louth by-election as a candidate for Desmond Donnelly's recently formed Democratic Party, coming last. He was succeeded on his death in 2001 by his son Adrian FitzGerald, the 24th Knight and 6th Baronet.

Titles of nobility (Ireland)
Preceded by Arthur Fitzgerald	Knight of Kerry; 1967–2001	Succeeded by Adrian Fitzgerald
Baronetage of the United Kingdom
Preceded by Arthur Fitzgerald	Baronet (of Valencia); 1967–2001	Succeeded by Adrian Fitzgerald
