= Bryan Townsend (Irish politician) =

Irish politician

Bryan Townsend (c. 1660–1726) was an Irish politician and sailor.

He was the second son of Richard Townsend and his wife Mary Hyde. Towsend served in the Royal Navy and commanded HMS Swiftsure. He entered the Irish House of Commons in 1695, representing Clonakilty until 1699.

In 1681, he married Mary Synge, daughter of Edward Synge, Bishop of Cork, Cloyne and Ross, and by her he had four daughters and nine sons. His grandsons were Richard Townsend and John Townsend.

Parliament of Ireland
Preceded by Francis Bernard; Percy Freke	Member of Parliament for Clonakilty; 1695–1699; With: Percy Freke	Succeeded by Ralph Freke; George Freke
