= Knight of Kerry =

Irish Hiberno-Norman hereditary knighthood

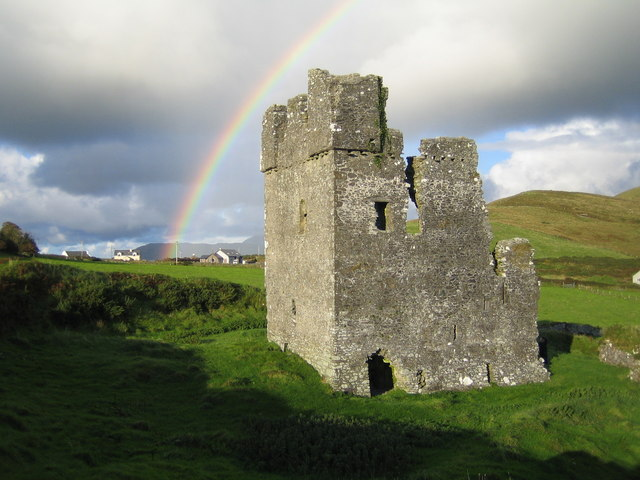
Rahinnane Castle, residence of the Knights from c. 1500 to c. 1650

Knight of Kerry (Irish: Ridire Chiarraí), also called The Green Knight, is one of three Hiberno-Norman hereditary knighthoods, all of which existed in Ireland since feudal times. The other two were The White Knight (surname fixed as Fitzgibbon), being dormant since the 19th century, and the Knight of Glin (The Black Knight), dormant since 2011. All three belong to the FitzMaurice/FitzGerald dynasty, commonly known as the Geraldines, being created by the Earls of Desmond for their kinsmen.

Sir Maurice Buidhe FitzJohn, 1st Knight of Kerry, was the illegitimate son of John FitzGerald, 1st Baron Desmond (d. 1261 Battle of Callann), son of Thomas FitzMaurice, Lord OConnello, son of Maurice FitzGerald, Lord of Lanstephan, son of the Princess Nest ferch Rhys of Deheubarth and Gerald de Windsor.

== Knights of Kerry ==
- Sir Maurice Buidhe FitzJohn, 1st Knight of Kerry
- Sir Richard FitzMaurice, 2nd Knight of Kerry
- Sir Maurice FitzRichard, 3rd Knight of Kerry (married Margaret de Courcy in 1382)
- Sir Edmond FitzMaurice, 4th Knight of Kerry
- Sir Nicholas FitzMaurice, 5th Knight of Kerry (held the office of Bishop of Ardfert circa 1408)
- Sir John Caoch FitzNicholas, 6th Knight of Kerry (fl. 1470s)
- Sir Maurice FitzJohn, 7th Knight of Kerry
- Sir John FitzMaurice, 8th Knight of Kerry (appointed Bishop of Ardfert on 20 November 1495)
- Sir William FitzJohn, 9th Knight of Kerry
- Sir John FitzGerald, 10th Knight of Kerry (d. 7 September 1595)
- Sir William FitzGerald, 11th Knight of Kerry (d. 6 November 1640)
- Sir John FitzGerald, 12th Knight of Kerry
- Sir John FitzGerald, 13th Knight of Kerry
- Sir Maurice FitzGerald, 14th Knight of Kerry
- Sir John FitzGerald, 15th Knight of Kerry (1706–1741)
- Sir Maurice FitzGerald, 16th Knight of Kerry (c. 1734–1779)
- Sir Robert FitzGerald, 17th Knight of Kerry (1717–1781)
- Sir Maurice FitzGerald, 18th Knight of Kerry (1774–1849)
- Sir Peter George FitzGerald, 1st Baronet of Valentia, 19th Knight of Kerry (1808–1880)
- Sir Maurice Fitzgerald, 2nd Baronet of Valentia, 20th Knight of Kerry (1844–1916)
- Sir John Peter Gerald Maurice Fitzgerald, 3rd Baronet of Valentia, 21st Knight of Kerry (1884–1957)
- Sir Arthur Henry Brinsley Fitzgerald, 4th Baronet of Valentia, 22nd Knight of Kerry (1885–1967)
- Sir George Peter Maurice FitzGerald, 5th Baronet of Valentia, 23rd Knight of Kerry (1917–2001)
- Sir Adrian James Andrew Denis FitzGerald, 6th Baronet of Valentia, 24th Knight of Kerry (born 1940)

== See also ==
- Irish nobility
