= Robert Alexander (Irish politician) =

Anglo-Irish politician (1752–1827)

- Preceded by: Richard Townsend; Robert FitzGerald
- Succeeded by: Hayes St Leger; Richard Boyle Townsend

Personal details
- Born: 1752
- Died: July 14, 1827
- Occupation: Politician
- Known for: Member of Parliament in the Irish House of Commons

Robert Alexander (1752 – 14 July 1827) was an Anglo-Irish politician.

Alexander was the Member of the Parliament for Dingle in the Irish House of Commons from 1777 to 1783. He then represented Newtownards between 1798 and 1800, shortly before the seat's disenfranchisement under the Acts of Union 1800.

Parliament of Ireland
Preceded by Richard Townsend; Robert FitzGerald	Member of Parliament for Dingle; 1777–1783; With: Robert FitzGerald (1777–1782); Richard Boyle Townsend (1782–1783)	Succeeded by Hayes St Leger; Richard Boyle Townsend
Preceded by Richard Annesley; John La Touche	Member of Parliament for Newtownards; 1798–1800; With: Sir John Blaquiere, Bt	Succeeded by Sir John Blaquiere, Bt; Du Pré Alexander
