= Buckland House =

Georgian manor house of Buckland in Oxfordshire, England

Coordinates: 51.6816°N 1.5089°W

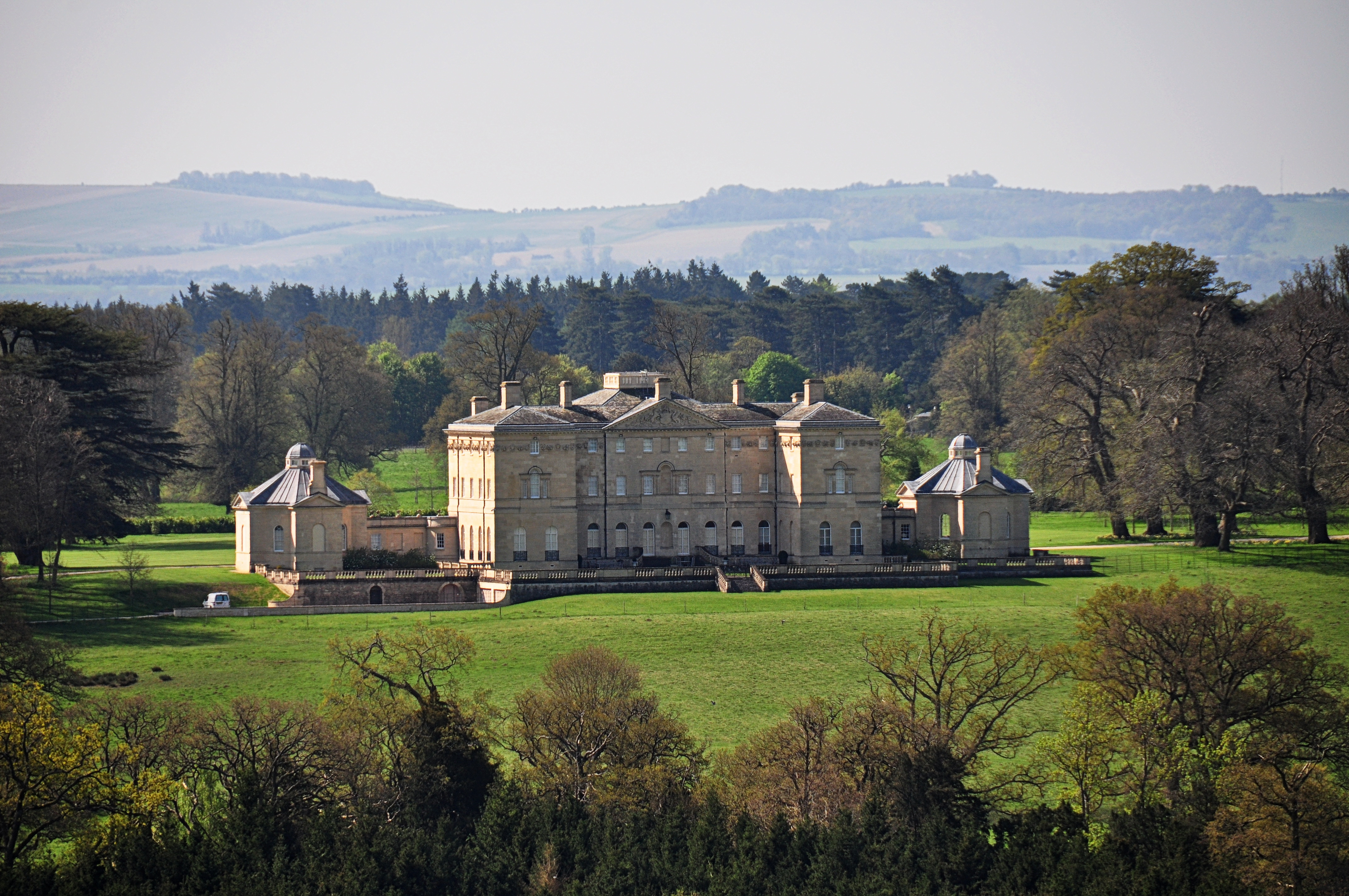
Buckland House with backdrop of the North Wessex Downs

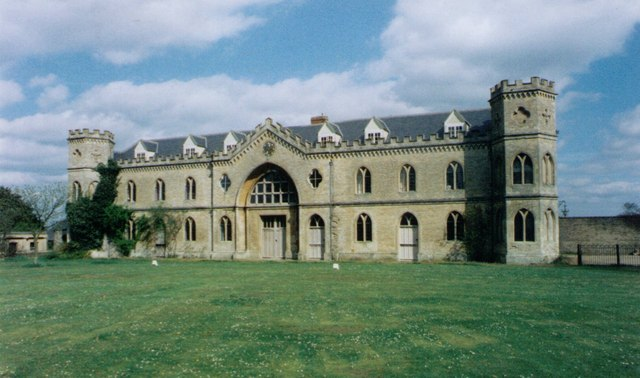
The old Buckland House known as 'Buckland Manor House'

Buckland House is a large Georgian stately home, the manor house of Buckland in Oxfordshire, England (formerly in Berkshire). It is a masterpiece of Palladian architecture erected by John Wood, the Younger for Sir Robert Throckmorton in 1757 to replace a previous manor house.

Buckland House has nine bays, the three central ones being narrow on each of its three storeys. Two wings of lower height adjoining connected by narrow galleries. The building overlooks a landscaped park, which includes gardens, a cricket ground and a 150-acre (61 ha) deer park. Buckland House is a Grade II* listed building. Nikolaus Pevsner described it as "the most splendid Georgian house in the Country". It is rumoured that a ghost of a white lady haunts the house.

The previous manor house, Buckland Manor House, also a Grade II* listed building, was converted into stables in 1797 and is in the park.

== Owners ==
In the mid-1750s Sir Robert Throckmorton, 4th Baronet had Buckland House built to replace his previous manor house. Following his death in 1791, Sir John Courtenay Throckmorton inherited the estate. Between 1870 and 1872, it was said the house had relics of Mary, Queen of Scots and Charles I, some other curiosities and some fine pictures.

Sir Maurice and Lady Fitzgerald took over the property from the Throckmortons and lived there until his death in 1919 and hers in 1947. Visitors to the house during the Fitzgeralds' tenure included Winston Churchill and Queen Mary, who had objets d'art stored in the basement during World War II. Buckland House then passed to Major Richard Wellesley, grandson of Lady Fitzgerald.

In 1962 Major Richard Wellesley advertised Buckland House in The Times for "£8 a week".

In 1963, it became the location of an independent university college (University Hall, Buckland) requiring GCE A-level passes for applicants and offering University of London external degrees in the arts.

In 2004, motorcar driver Patrick McNally bought Buckland House and began a major restoration to its former glory.

== Architectural history ==
=== Original house ===
The Throckmortons owned the Buckland estate since 1690, living in the manor house but it was Sir Robert Throckmorton, the fourth baronet of Coughton, who commissioned John Wood (the Elder) of Bath to design the new Buckland House as a shooting lodge and weekend retreat. John Wood, the Younger substantially revised the plan and added the distinctive octagonal pavilions to the sides of the house. The final house is illustrated in the 1767 volume of Vitruvius Britannicus.

The house includes features such as marble fireplaces, exquisite mouldings, cornicing and painted ceilings. It is symmetrical and long passages lead to the two octagonal pavilions, used today as a library and dining room. 15 bedrooms were built into the house in total to hold both family and staff. It is rumoured that one of the bedrooms was designed as a copy of Marie Antoinette's bedroom from Versaille. The saloon has Corinthian pilasters, bold cornices and well carved festoons

=== 1908 additions ===
The new owner engaged the architect W. H. Romaine-Walker to enlarge the property, addings wings on the north front to house a Billiard Room and a Royal Suite, rumoured to have been built to make the property large enough for King Edward VII to visit. Additional rooms were added upstairs in the property too, taking the total number of bedrooms to 19. Finally, a rear terrace was also added.

=== Major alterations and repairs ===
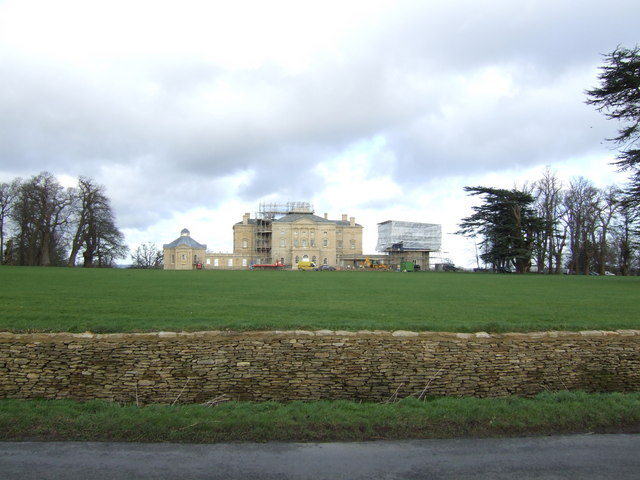
Buckland House during roof repairs

With the last planning permission on the property approved in 1993, the owners of Buckland House started applying for planning permission to improve the property:

- August 2002 for restoration of parterres, formal pools, a long pool, a ha-ha wall, replacement planting, reinstatement of a drive and widening the existing drive. Also extensions to the lower ground to create additional garage facilities, a swimming pool and a squash court.: (Approved)
- September 2002 for a helicopter landing pad with an underground bunker and tunnel link to the house. (Approved)
- March 2003 to make alterations. (Withdrawn)
- March 2003 to change the use of the property from residential to a hotel along with alterations and extensions. (Refused)
- April 2003 to change the use of the property from residential to a corporate headquarters. (Refused)
- April 2003 to change the use of the property from residential to a nursing/mental home. (Refused)
- June 2003 to make alterations, extensions and convert the property to be a nursing home. (Approved)
- June 2003 to make alterations, extensions and convert the property to be a corporate headquarters. (Withdrawn)
- January 2004 to change the use of the property from a residential property to an hotel. and make alterations and extensions. (Approved)
- February 2005 to remove existing CCTV cameras and replace with smaller ones.: (Approved)
- March 2005 to make alterations, extensions and refurbishment. (Approved)
- April 2006 for alterations and refurbishment and an extension to underground parking.: (Approved)
- December 2006 for retrospective permission for the erection of railings and gates. (Approved)
- April 2007 for removal of existing railings and the erection of new railings and a timber fence. (Approved)
- April 2008 for a new stone wall, car park provisions, demolition of entrance gates, new main and secondary gates, hard landscaping plus new security and livestock. (Approved)
- 2004-2009 Complete internal restoration from complete full central heating to all rooms, complete rewire with state-of-the-art security and full restoration or replacement of all finer details, cornices, silk walls, gold leafed staircases, fireplaces etc.

== Gardens ==
The entire landscape garden was designed by Richard Woods, a contemporary of Capability Brown. The lakes were designed to look like a part of the River Thames and were joined with a small waterfall.

During the late eighteenth and early nineteenth century there was further landscaping and planting, supervised by Sir John Courtenay Throckmorton.

In 1908 Romaine-Walker created the formal terrace on the north front as part of the broad redevelopment commissioned at that time. Lady Fitzgerald supervised the construction of a water garden with rock paths on the north side of the lake.

The garden is occasionally open to the public under the NGS Gardens Open For Charity scheme with the entrance fee donated to the Richard Wellesley Memorial Transport fund.

== Icehouse ==
An icehouse, also designed by Richard Woods, was sited halfway between the two lakes on a north facing slope behind the house. The portico matches that of Buckland House. The icehouse is a cup and dome design, built partially underground and with a thatched roof, all to increase insulation. It was the subject of a local history article published on the BBC website. Estate workers would break ice from the pond with picks and saws, relay it to the shore and then quickly take it to the icehouse. Once there, it was packed hard to make maximum use of the interior. Throughout the year, manageable lumps of ice would be taken to the house, placed in ice-drawers in the kitchen larder and then used for food preservation and making iced confections. This method enabled ice to be available through the summer months.
