= Sir Maurice FitzGerald, 2nd Baronet =

Anglo-Irish nobleman

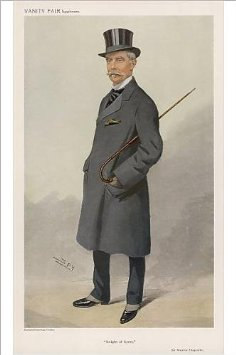
"Knight of Kerry". Caricature by Spy published in Vanity Fair in 1909

Sir Maurice FitzGerald, 2nd Baronet, CVO, JP, DL (5 February 1844 - 22 October 1916), also styled as the 20th Knight of Kerry, was an Anglo-Irish aristocrat, landowner, and soldier.

== Life ==
He was born on 5 February 1844, the eldest son of Sir Peter FitzGerald, 1st Baronet, and his wife, Julia Hussey, daughter of Peter Hussey. He succeeded his father to the baronetcy—in addition to the illustrious knighthood of Kerry—in 1880.

FitzGerald was commissioned as an officer in the Rifle Brigade in 1863. He fought in the Third Anglo-Ashanti War in which he served as ADC to Gen. Sir Archibald Alison. He remained with his regiment until 1883, by which time he had received promotion to the rank of Captain. He later also served as equerry to Prince Arthur, Duke of Connaught.

On 4 October 1882, FitzGerald married Amelia Catherine Bischoffsheim, daughter of prosperous banker Henri Louis Bischoffsheim. They had three children. Throughout his life, FitzGerald was an enthusiastic yachtsman, member of the Royal Yacht Squadron, and owned several vessels including The Satanita, a winning racing cutter.

In 1909, FitzGerald acquired Buckland House, a grand Georgian house near Farringdon, Berkshire, where on one occasion he hosted King Edward VII. Following his wife's death in 1947, she bequeathed the property to their grandson Major Richard Wellesley, in which family the estate remains. He died at Buckland on 22 October 1916 aged 72.
