= Charles Compton (MP, born 1698) =

Member of Parliament for Northampton
- In office 9 December 1754 – 20 November 1755

Personal details
- Born: 30 January 1698
- Died: 20 November 1755 (aged 57)
- Relations: James Compton, 5th Earl of Northampton (brother); George Compton, 6th Earl of Northampton (brother)
- Parent: George Compton, 4th Earl of Northampton

Charles Compton (30 January 1698 – 20 November 1755) was an English politician and diplomat who was Member of Parliament (MP) for Northampton and Envoy to Portugal.

== Early life ==
His mother Jane Fox was the half-sister of Henry Fox, 1st Baron Holland.

== Family ==
Compton married Mary Lucy and had six children:

- Charles Compton, 7th Earl of Northampton (1737–1763), married Lady Ann Somerset, eldest daughter of Charles Somerset, 4th Duke of Beaufort.
- Spencer Compton, 8th Earl of Northampton (1738–1796), married Jane Lawton. He died in April 1796 and was succeeded in his titles by his son Charles.
- Elizabeth Compton (1744–1819), married Henry Drummond.
- Mary Compton, married Richard Haddock and Arthur Scott.
- Jane Compton (1730–1757), married George Rodney, 1st Baron Rodney.
- Catherine Compton (1731–1784), married John Perceval, 2nd Earl of Egmont.

== See also ==
- List of MPs elected in the 1754 British general election
