= Robert FitzGerald, 17th Knight of Kerry =

Robert FitzGerald, 17th Knight of Kerry (1717 – 5 December 1781) was an Irish politician, barrister and hereditary knight.

He was the second son of Maurice FitzGerald, 14th Knight of Kerry and his wife Elizabeth Crosbie, second daughter of David Crosbie. He graduated with a Bachelor of Law and served then as Judge of the Admiralty Court. In 1741, he entered the Irish House of Commons and sat for Dingle, the same constituency his older brother John had represented before, until his death. In 1779, he succeeded his nephew Maurice as Knight of Kerry.

In March 1746, FitzGerald married firstly Lucy Leslie, daughter of John Leslie of Tarbert, County Kerry, and niece of James Leslie (bishop) of Limerick. She died only four years later and he married secondly Catherine FitzGerald, second daughter of Thomas FitzGerald, 18th Knight of Glin in 1752. After the death of his second wife in 1759, FitzGerald married lastly Catherine Sandes, daughter of Lancelot Sandes in 1770 and had by her two sons and a daughter. FitzGerald died in 1781 and was succeeded in his title by his older son Maurice.

Parliament of Ireland
Preceded by John Perceval, Viscount Perceval; John FitzGerald	Member of Parliament for Dingle; 1741 – 1781; With: John Perceval, Viscount Perceval 1741–1749; Sir William Fownes, 2nd Bt 1749–1761; Maurice FitzGerald 1761–1776; Richard Townsend 1776–1777; Robert Alexander 1777–1781	Succeeded by Robert Alexander; Richard Boyle Townsend
Titles of nobility (Ireland)
Preceded by Maurice FitzGerald	Knight of Kerry; 1779 – 1781	Succeeded by Maurice FitzGerald
