= John Perceval, 2nd Earl of Egmont =

British politician (1711–1770)

The Right Honourable The Earl of Egmont PC FRS
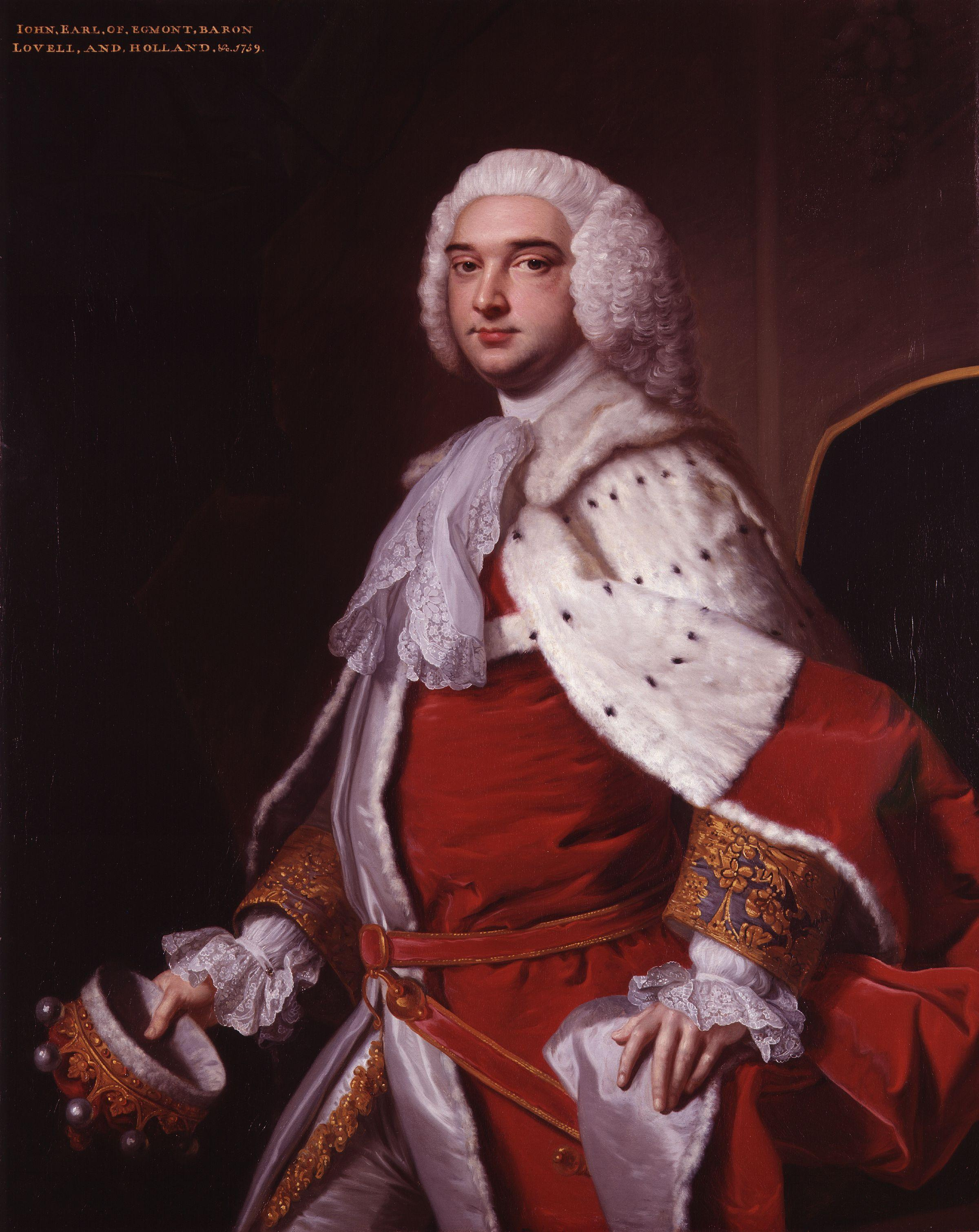
- Portrait by Thomas Hudson, c. 1759

First Lord of the Admiralty
- In office 1763–1766
- Preceded by: The Earl of Sandwich
- Succeeded by: Sir Charles Saunders

Postmaster General
- In office 1762–1763 Serving with Robert Hampden-Trevor
- Preceded by: The Earl of Bessborough; Robert Hampden-Trevor
- Succeeded by: The Lord Hyde; Robert Hampden-Trevor

Member of Parliament for Ilchester
- In office 1761–1761 Serving with Joseph Tolson Lockyer
- Preceded by: Thomas Lockyer; Joseph Tolson Lockyer
- Succeeded by: William Wilson; Joseph Tolson Lockyer

Member of Parliament for Bridgwater
- In office 1754–1762 Serving with Robert Balch, Edward Southwell
- Preceded by: George Dodington; Robert Balch
- Succeeded by: Viscount Perceval; Edward Southwell

Member of Parliament for Weobly
- In office 1747–1754 Serving with Savage Mostyn
- Preceded by: Mansel Powell; Savage Mostyn
- Succeeded by: John Craster; Savage Mostyn

Member of Parliament for Westminster
- In office 1741–1747 Serving with Charles Edwin
- Preceded by: Sir Charles Wager; The Lord Sundon
- Succeeded by: Viscount Trentham; Sir Peter Warren

Member of Parliament for Dingle
- In office 1731–1749 Serving with John FitzGerald, Robert FitzGerald
- Preceded by: Thomas Crosbie; John FitzGerald
- Succeeded by: Sir William Fownes, 2nd Baronet; Robert FitzGerald

Personal details
- Born: John Perceval; 25 February 1711
- Died: 4 December 1770 (aged 59) Pall Mall, London
- Spouses: Lady Catherine Cecil (m. 1737; died 1752) Catherine Compton (m. 1756)
- Children: 16
- Parent(s): John Perceval, 1st Earl of Egmont; Catherine Parker

John Perceval, 2nd Earl of Egmont PC FRS (24 or 25 February 1711 – 4 December 1770) was a British politician, political pamphleteer, and genealogist who served as First Lord of the Admiralty. Of Anglo-Irish background, he sat in both the Irish and British Parliaments. He was the father of the Regency Era Prime Minister Spencer Perceval.

== Early life ==
He was the son and heir of John Perceval, 1st Earl of Egmont, by his wife Catherine Parker. He was baptised at the Palace of Westminster, London. His two siblings were Lady Catharine Perceval (wife of Thomas Hanmer MP of The Fenns) and Lady Helena Perceval (wife of John Rawdon, 1st Earl of Moira).

His paternal grandparents were Sir John Perceval, 3rd Baronet of Lohort Castle and the former Catherine Dering (daughter of Sir Edward Dering, 2nd Baronet). His maternal grandparents were Sir Philip Parker, 2nd Baronet of Arwarton and the former Mary Fortray (a daughter of landowner and author Samuel Fortrey of Byall Fen).

He succeeded his father in 1748 as 2nd Earl of Egmont in the Peerage of Ireland.

== Career ==
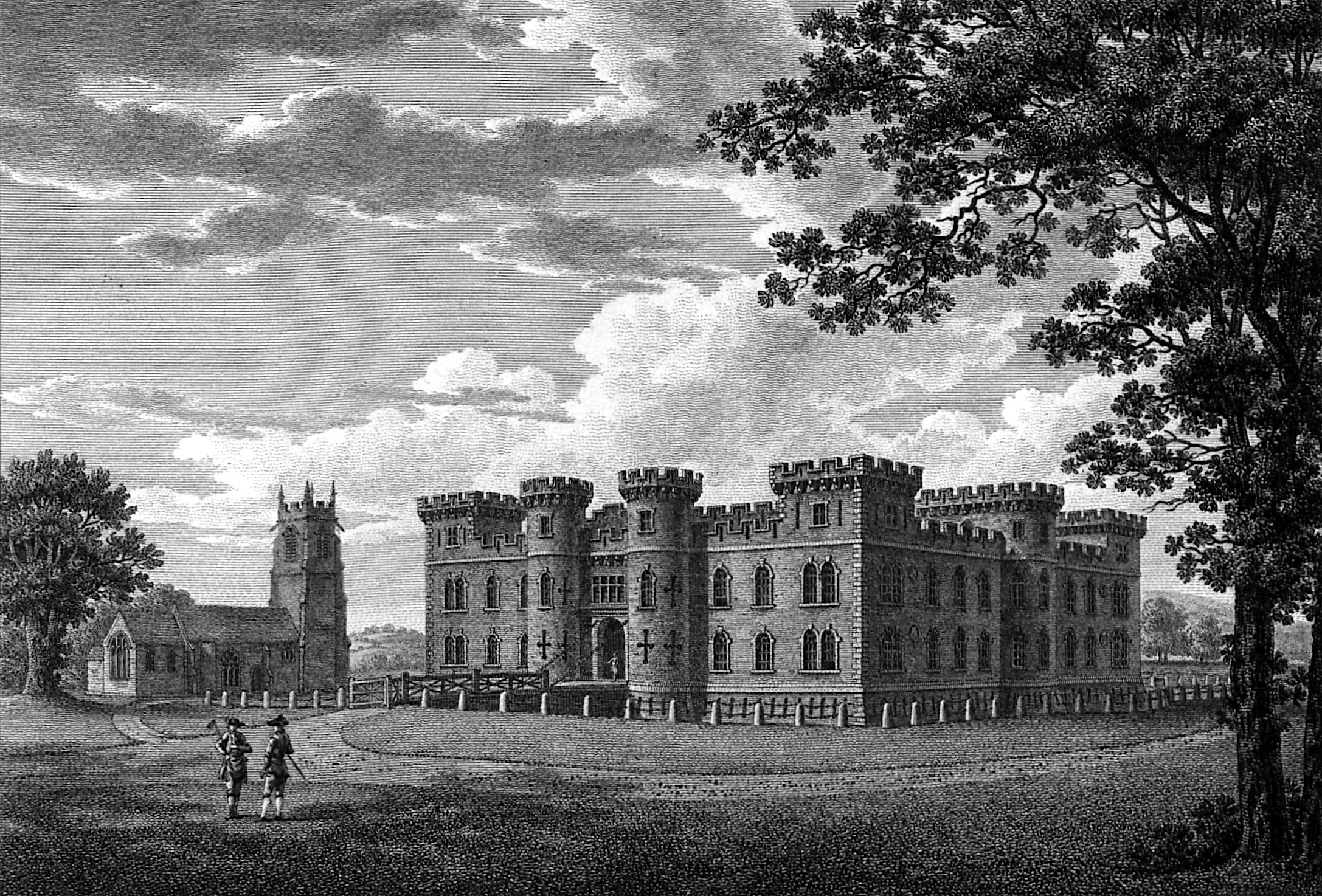
Enmore Castle, 1779

Perceval sat in the Irish House of Commons for Dingle between 1731 and 1749. In April 1748, he was created Gentleman of the Bedchamber to the Prince of Wales. He was made a Privy Counsellor in January 1755.

He sat in the Parliament of Ireland for Dingle (1731–49) and in the House of Commons for Westminster (1741–47), Weobley (1747–54) and Bridgwater (1754–62). In 1762 he was created Baron Lovel and Holland, of Enmore in the County of Somerset, in the Peerage of Great Britain, which gave him a seat in the British House of Lords. From 1751 to 1757, he designed and created Enmore Castle at Enmore in Somerset, which received "the dismissive mockery of Horace Walpole".

He was appointed joint Postmaster-General for 1762–3 alongside Robert Hampden, 4th Baron Trevor and served as First Lord of the Admiralty from 1763 to 1766. As First Lord of the Admiralty, places named in his honour were Port Egmont, the first British settlement in the Falkland Islands and Mount Taranaki in New Zealand, which was named Mount Egmont by Captain James Cook in 1770 during his first voyage around the world.

== Personal life ==
Arms of Perceval, Earls of Egmont: Quarterly 1st & 4th: Argent, on a chief indented gules three crosses patée of the field (Perceval); 2nd & 3rd: Barry nebulée of six or and gules (Lovel)

Perceval married twice. His first marriage was on 15 February 1737 to Lady Catherine Cecil, who was the second daughter of James Cecil, 5th Earl of Salisbury. Before her death on 16 August 1752, aged 33, they had five sons and two daughters:

- John Perceval, 3rd Earl of Egmont (29 January 1738 – 25 February 1822), eldest son and heir.
- Cecil Parker Perceval (19 October 1739 – 4 March 1753), died at Eton College.
- Philip Tufton Perceval (10 March 1742 –1795), a captain in the Royal Navy.
- Edward Perceval, (21 April 1744 –1824), a captain in the Royal Dragoon Guards, who married Sarah Howarth, daughter of John Howarth, in 1775.
- Catherine Perceval (20 February 1746 –1782), who married Thomas Wynn (1736–1807) (afterwards 1st Baron Newborough), in 1766.
- Margaret Perceval (10 October 1748 –1750).
- Frederick Augustus Perceval (11 February 1750 –1757).

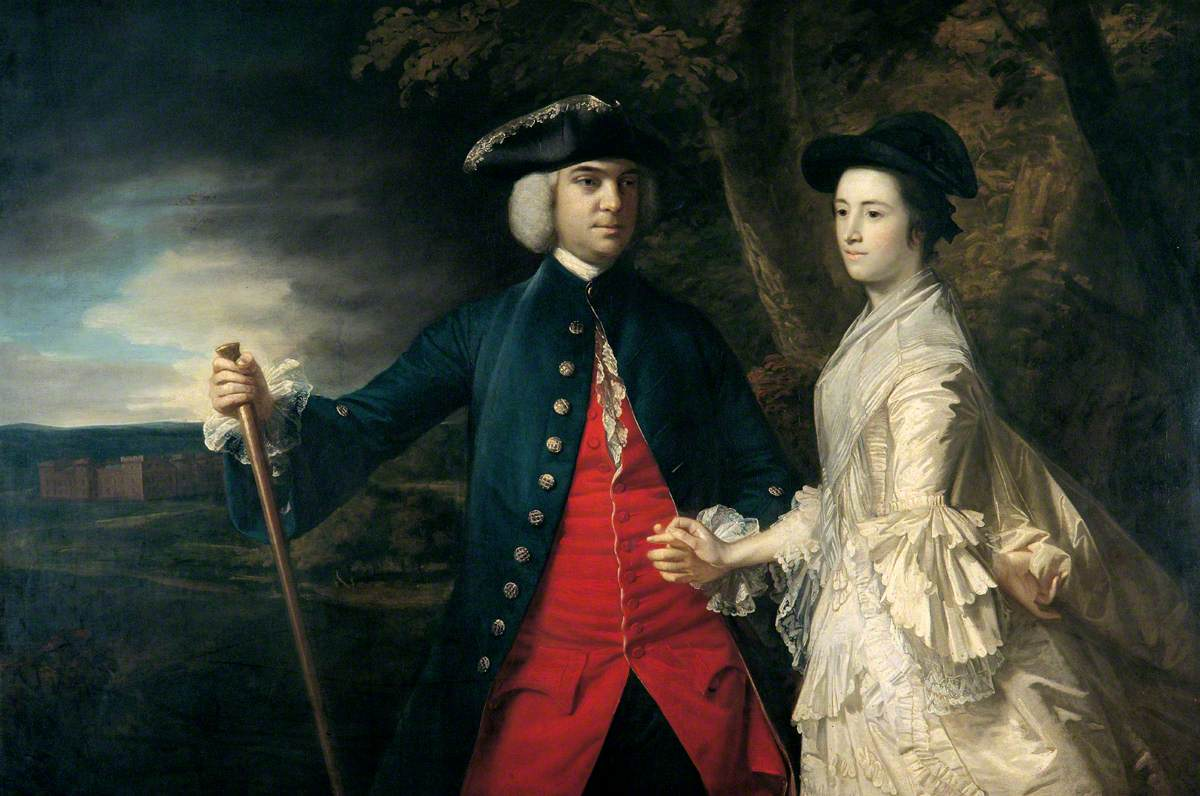
John, 2nd Earl of Egmont and His Second Wife Catherine.

His second marriage was to Catherine Compton, the third daughter of the Hon. Charles Compton and sister of Charles Compton, 7th Earl of Northampton and Spencer Compton, 8th Earl of Northampton, on 26 January 1756. By Catherine Compton he had three sons and six daughters as follows:

- Charles George Perceval (1756–1840), eldest son, who succeeded his mother as Baron Arden in the peerage of Ireland, and was created a peer of the United Kingdom, with the title of Baron Arden of Arden in the county of Warwick
- Mary Perceval (d. 1839), who married Andrew Berkeley Drummond of Cadlands, Hampshire, a grandson of William Drummond, 4th Viscount Strathallan (died 1746), in 1781.
- Anne Perceval (15 December 1759 – 1 August 1772).
- Charlotte Perceval (b. 31 January 1761, d. 1761), who died an infant.
- Spencer Perceval (1762–1812), who served as Prime Minister of the United Kingdom from October 1809 to May 1812.
- Elizabeth Perceval (d. 1846), who died aged 82, unmarried.
- Henry Perceval (1765–1772), who died aged 7.
- Frances Perceval (b. 4 December 1767, d. 1817), who married John, 1st Baron Redesdale in 1803.
- Margaret Perceval (b. 17 March 1769, d. 1854), who married Thomas Walpole, sometime ambassador at Munich, a nephew of Horatio Walpole, 1st Earl of Orford, in 1803.

Lord Perceval died on 4 December 1770 at Pall Mall, London, aged 59. Following his death, his widow was created on 23 May 1770 Baroness Arden of Lohort Castle in the county of Cork in the peerage of Ireland, with remainder to her heirs male. She survived her husband and died at Langley, Buckinghamshire, on 11 June 1784, aged 53.

=== Legacy ===
Port Egmont in the Falkland Islands, established in 1765, is named after him.

Mount Egmont in New Zealand was named after him by James Cook in recognition of his encouragement of Cook's first voyage. While the mountain has returned to its original Maori name of Taranaki since the 2000s, the Egmont name still applies to the national park that surrounds the peak and geologists still refer to the peak as the Egmont Volcano.

Parliament of Ireland
Preceded by Thomas Crosbie; John FitzGerald	Member of Parliament for Dingle; 1731–1749; With: John FitzGerald 1731–1741; Robert FitzGerald 1741–1749	Succeeded by Sir William Fownes, 2nd Baronet; Robert FitzGerald
Parliament of Great Britain
Preceded by Sir Charles Wager; The Lord Sundon	Member of Parliament for Westminster; 1741–1747; With: Charles Edwin	Succeeded by Viscount Trentham; Sir Peter Warren
Preceded by Mansel Powell; Savage Mostyn	Member of Parliament for Weobly; 1747–1754; With: Savage Mostyn	Succeeded by John Craster; Savage Mostyn
Preceded by George Dodington; Robert Balch	Member of Parliament for Bridgwater; 1754–1762; With: Robert Balch 1754–1761; Edward Southwell 1761–1762	Succeeded by Viscount Perceval; Edward Southwell
Preceded by Thomas Lockyer; Joseph Tolson Lockyer	Member of Parliament for Ilchester; 1761; With: Joseph Tolson Lockyer	Succeeded by William Wilson; Joseph Tolson Lockyer
Political offices
Preceded by The Earl of Bessborough; Robert Hampden-Trevor	Postmaster General; 1762–1763 with Robert Hampden-Trevor	Succeeded by The Lord Hyde; Robert Hampden-Trevor
Preceded by The Earl of Sandwich	First Lord of the Admiralty; 1763–1766	Succeeded by Sir Charles Saunders
Honorary titles
Vacant Title last held by The Lord Melcombe	Vice-Admiral of Somerset; 1766–1770	Vacant Title next held by The Duke of Somerset
Peerage of Ireland
Preceded by John Perceval	Earl of Egmont; 1748–1770	Succeeded by John Perceval
Peerage of Great Britain
New creation	Baron Lovel and Holland; 1762–1770	Succeeded by John Perceval
