= Bates baronets of Bellefield (1880) =

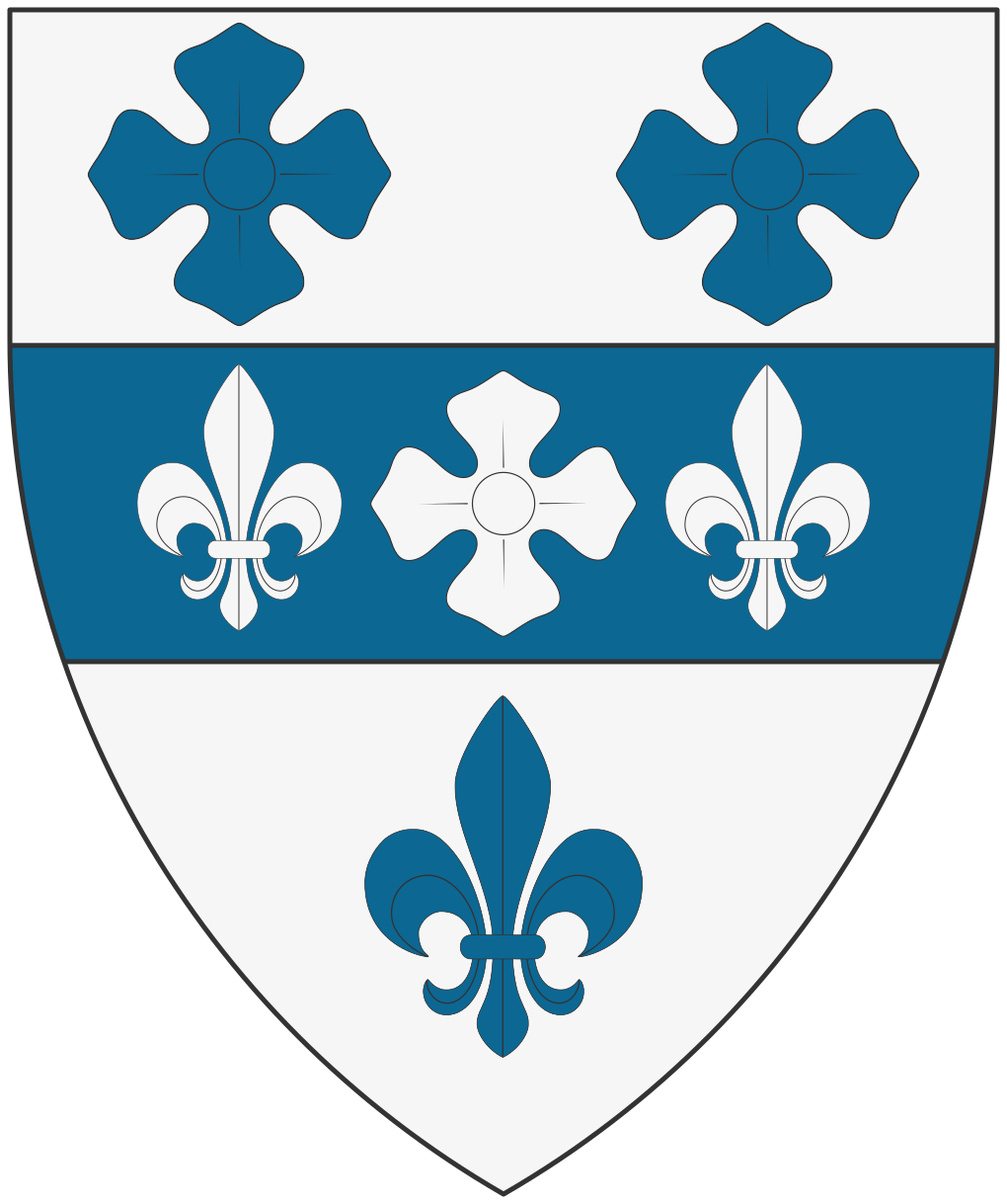
Escutcheon of the Bates baronets of Bellefield

The Bates baronetcy, of Bellefield in the County Palatine of Lancaster, was created in the Baronetage of the United Kingdom on 13 May 1880 for Edward Bates, Member of Parliament for Plymouth from 1871 to 1880, and from 1885 to 1892.

The 2nd Baronet was appointed High Sheriff of Flintshire for 1899. The 4th Baronet was Chairman of the Cunard Steam Ship Company, from 1934. He was High Sheriff of Cheshire in 1920.

The 5th Baronet was decorated with an MC in 1942, and was High Sheriff of Flintshire in 1969. The family seat was Gyrn Castle, near Holywell, Clwyd until 2008.

== Bates baronets, of Bellefield (1880) ==
- Sir Edward Bates, 1st Baronet (1816–1896)
- Sir Edward Percy Bates, 2nd Baronet (1845–1899)
- Sir Edward Bertram Bates, 3rd Baronet (1877–1903)
- Sir Percy Elly Bates, 4th Baronet (1879–1946)
- Sir Geoffrey Voltelin Bates, 5th Baronet (1921–2005)
- Sir Edward Robert Bates, 6th Baronet (1946–2007)
- Sir James Geoffrey Bates, 7th Baronet (born 1985)

The heir presumptive is the present holder's kinsman Hugh Percy Bates (born 1953).

== Notes ==
Baronetage of the United Kingdom
Preceded by Watkin baronets	Bates baronets of Bellefield; 13 May 1880	Succeeded by FitzGerald baronets
