= Bates baronets of Magherabuoy (1937) =

The Bates baronetcy, of Magherabuoy in the County of Londonderry, was created in the Baronetage of the United Kingdom on 7 June 1937 for the Northern Irish politician Dawson Bates. He was Minister of Home Affairs for Northern Ireland from 1921 to 1943.

The family seat was Magherabuoy House, near Portrush, County Antrim.

== Bates baronets, of Magherabuoy (1937) ==
- Sir (Richard) Dawson Bates, 1st Baronet (1876–1949)
- Sir (John) Dawson Bates, 2nd Baronet (1921–1998)
- Sir Richard Dawson Hoult Bates, 3rd Baronet (born 1956)

The heir apparent is the present holder's son Dominic Dawson Bates (born 2006).
