= FitzGerald baronets of Clenlish (1644) =

The FitzGerald baronetcy, of Clenlish in County Limerick, was created in the Baronetage of Ireland on 8 February 1644 for Edmond FitzGerald, a Royalist of the Irish Confederate Wars. The 2nd Baronet was a member of the 1689 Irish Parliament, who was then attainted in 1691, and the baronetcy was then forfeited.

Cokayne gives details of the assumption in the 18th century of the title by Richard FitzGerald, on the basis of a certificate obtained from the Ulster King of Arms. There were five putative baronets, including Gerald Richard Dalton-FitzGerald, recognised as the 10th Baronet by Debrett in 1880. On his death in 1894, the male line came to an end.

Escutcheon of Dalton-FitzGerald, from Debrett 1880

== FitzGerald baronets, of Clenlish (1617) ==
- Sir Edmond Fitzgerald, 1st Baronet (died c. 1665)
- Sir John Fitzgerald, 2nd Baronet (died 1708) (forfeit 1691)
