= Maurice FitzGerald, 18th Knight of Kerry =

Irish politician

The Right Honourable Sir Maurice FitzGerald

Knight of Kerry
- In office 5 December 1781 – 7 March 1849
- Monarchs: George III, George IV, William IV, Queen Victoria
- Preceded by: Robert FitzGerald
- Succeeded by: Peter George FitzGerald

Member of Parliament for County Kerry
- In office 1801–1831
- Preceded by: Created
- Succeeded by: Frederick William Mullins; Daniel O'Connell

Member of Parliament for Tralee
- In office 1806–1807
- Preceded by: George Canning
- Succeeded by: Samuel Boddington

Personal details
- Born: 29 December 1774
- Died: 7 March 1849 (aged 74)
- Party: Irish Whig
- Spouse(s): Maria la Touche; Cecilia Maria Knight
- Children: 10
- Parent(s): Robert FitzGerald; Catherine Sandes

Sir Maurice FitzGerald, 18th Knight of Kerry (29 December 1774 – 7 March 1849) was an hereditary knight and an Irish Whig politician.

== Early life ==
Sir Maurice FitzGerald was born on 29 December 1774 to Robert FitzGerald, 17th Knight of Kerry (1717–1781) and his third wife, Catherine Sandes, the daughter of Lancelot Sandes. Upon his father's death in 1781, the seven-year-old Maurice assumed the title of Knight of Kerry.

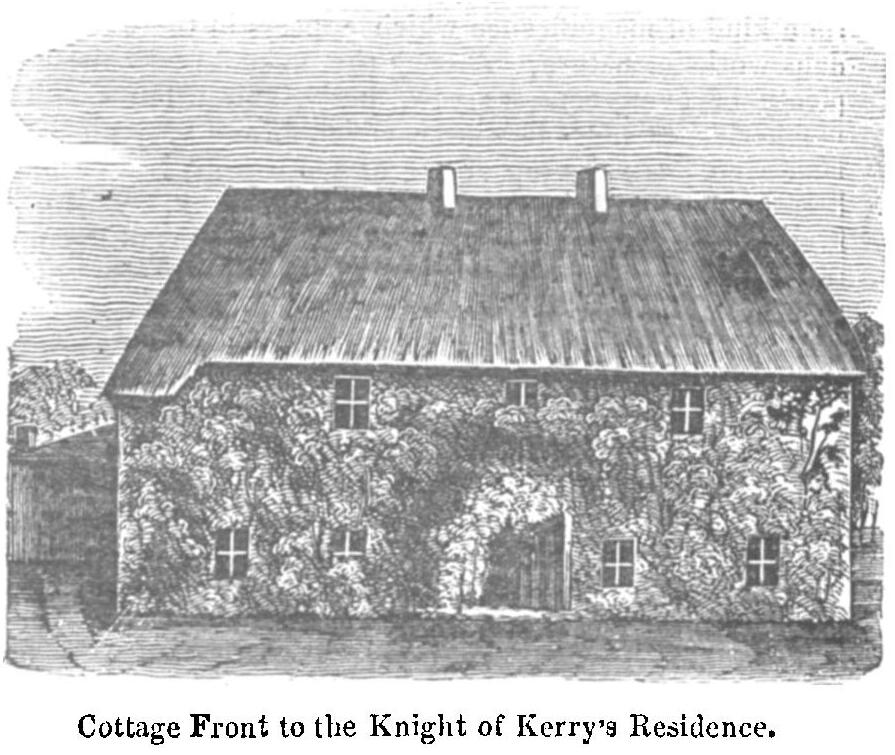
Cottage front to the Knight of Kerry's Ballinruddery residence, 1836, Dublin Penny Journal

Sir Maurice inherited the Fitzgerald family estates in County Kerry, which included residences and lands at Ballinruddery near Listowel, and Glanleam House on Valentia Island. Sir Maurice developed the famous Valentia slate quarry on the island. The blue-coloured slate was especially in demand for billiard tables. It was also widely sought as a roofing slate given its attractive blue shade, and was used on roofs of some of the most famous buildings of the day, such as the Paris Opera House, Westminster Abbey, St Paul's Cathedral and the new Palace of Westminster.

Sir Maurice was a botanist, recognized the potential of the island's microclimate for sub-tropical plants and laid out a fifty-acre garden, using species just introduced from South America. His efforts brought him great acclaim at the time and today his gardens have matured into dense woodlands.

In the Spring of 1848, English poet Alfred, Lord Tennyson paid a visit to the 18th Knight of Kerry on Valentia Island, having procured a letter of introduction from Sir Maurice's cousin, the Limerick poet Aubrey Thomas de Vere. In a footnote in his father's memoir, Tennyson's eldest son Hallam Tennyson includes a letter from Bewicke Blackburne who was supervising Valencia Island's quarry at that time. Here Bewicke includes many interesting details of Tennyson's visit to Valentia, and comments about Sir Maurice (Hallam Tennyson, Tennyson, A Memoir, 1898, pp. 1:291-292). In addition, Aubrey T. de Vere also describes his cousin Sir Maurice in Hallam's memoir: "Alfred Tennyson's desire to see cliffs and waves revived, and we sent him to our cousin, Maurice FitzGerald, Knight of Kerry, who live at Valentia where they are seen at their best. . . . The next morning he pursued his way alone to Valencia. He soon wrote that he had enjoyed it. He had found there the highest waves that Ireland knows, cliffs that at one spot rise to the height of 600 feet, tamarisks and fuchsias that no sea winds can intimidate, and the old 'Knight of Kerry,' who, at the age of nearly 80, preserved the spirits, the grace and the majestic beauty of days gone by -- as chivalrous a representative of Desmond's great Norman House as it had ever put forth in those times when it fought side by side with the greatest Gaelic Houses, for Ireland's ancient faith, and the immemorial rights of its Palatinate." (de Vere qtd. in H. Tennyson, 1898, p. 1:291).

Blackburne writes of Sir Maurice at the time of Tennyson's visit that: "[No one] will hardly have forgotten the old Knight of Kerry, the owner of the Island, his dignified presence and his redolence of Grattan and John Philpot Curran and Castlereagh and the Irish Parliament in which he sat for many years" (Blackburne qtd. in H. Tennyson, 1898, p. 1:292fn).

== Career ==
Sir Maurice FitzGerald represented County Kerry in the Irish House of Commons from 1795 until the Act of Union in 1801. He sat also for Tralee in 1800. Travelling in Belgium during the Waterloo Campaign of 1815, he brought news of the impending Battle of Waterloo from Ghent to London. He was appointed joint Civil Lord of the Admiralty from 1834 to 1835.

== Personal life ==
On 5 November 1801, FitzGerald married Maria la Touche, the daughter of the Right Hon. David la Touche of Marlay in Dublin. Maria's brother was Peter La Touche (1775–1830), a Member of Parliament in 1802–1806. Together, they had 10 children:

- Maurice FitzGerald (died 1836), unmarried.
- David FitzGerald (died 1848), unmarried.
- Robert FitzGerald (died 1835), married Ellen Hussey, eldest daughter Peter Bodkin Hussey of Farranikilla House, County Kerry.
- Brinsley FitzGerald (died 1832), unmarried.
- Sir Peter FitzGerald (1808–1880) 19th Knight of Kerry, who married Julia Hussey, another daughter of Peter Bodkin Hussey.
- Stephen Edward FitzGerald (1816–?), who married Margaret Story, daughter of Rev. R. Story.
- Elizabeth Emily FitzGerald (died 1860), married Cofton Thomas Vandeleur.
- Maria FitzGerald
- Gertrude FitzGerald (died 1828), unmarried.
- Catherine FitzGerald, who married Colonel Edward Symes Bayly, the High Sheriff of Wicklow in 1837.

After Maria's death in 1829, he married the widow, Cecilia Maria Knight, who died in 1859.

== Sources ==
- Leigh Rayment's Historical List of MPs

Parliament of Ireland
Preceded by Sir Barry Denny, 2nd Bt; John Gustavus Crosbie	Member of Parliament for County Kerry; 1795–1801; With: John Gustavus Crosbie 1795–1798; James Crosbie 1798–1801	Succeeded by Parliament of the United Kingdom
Preceded by William Fletcher; Sir Boyle Roche, 1st Bt	Member of Parliament for Tralee; 1800; With: James Crosbie	Succeeded by Arthur Moore; Henry Kemmis
Parliament of the United Kingdom
New constituency	Member of Parliament for County Kerry; 1801–1831; With: James Crosbie 1801–1806, 1812–1826; Henry Arthur Herbert 1806–1812; William Hare 1826–1830; William Browne 1830–1831	Succeeded by Frederick Mullins; Daniel O'Connell
Preceded by George Canning	Member of Parliament for Tralee; 1806–1807	Succeeded by Samuel Boddington
Titles of nobility (Ireland)
Preceded by Robert FitzGerald	Knight of Kerry; 1781–1849	Succeeded by Peter George FitzGerald
