= Maurice FitzGerald, 16th Knight of Kerry =

Maurice FitzGerald, 16th Knight of Kerry (c. 1734 – 24 June 1779), known as "The Dingle Knight", was an Irish politician, barrister and hereditary knight.

He was the only surviving son of John FitzGerald, 15th Knight of Kerry and his wife Margaret Deane, daughter of Joseph Deane. In 1741, he succeeded his father as Knight of Kerry. FitzGerald was Judge of the Admiralty Court and in 1761, he entered the Irish House of Commons. He sat for Dingle, the same constituency his father had represented before, until 1776.

On 10 June 1764, he married his cousin Lady Anne FitzMaurice, only daughter of William FitzMaurice, 2nd Earl of Kerry. FitzGerald died childless and was succeeded in his title by his uncle Robert. His nephew Richard Boyle Townsend became heir of his estates.

Parliament of Ireland
Preceded by Robert FitzGerald; Sir William Fownes, 2nd Bt	Member of Parliament for Dingle; 1761 – 1776; With: Robert FitzGerald	Succeeded by Robert FitzGerald; Richard Townsend
Titles of nobility (Ireland)
Preceded by John FitzGerald	Knight of Kerry; 1741 – 1779	Succeeded by Robert FitzGerald
