= Sir Peter FitzGerald, 1st Baronet =

Anglo-Irish nobleman

The Right Honourable Sir Peter FitzGerald

1st Baronet of Valentia
- In office 8 July 1880 – 6 August 1880
- Monarch: Queen Victoria
- Preceded by: Created
- Succeeded by: Sir Maurice FitzGerald, 2nd Baronet

19th Knight of Kerry
- In office 7 March 1849 – 6 August 1880
- Monarch: Queen Victoria
- Preceded by: Maurice FitzGerald
- Succeeded by: Sir Maurice FitzGerald, 2nd Baronet

Personal details
- Born: 15 September 1808 Dublin, Ireland
- Died: 6 August 1880 (aged 71)
- Spouse: Julia Hussey
- Children: 11
- Parent(s): Maurice FitzGerald; Maria la Touche

Sir Peter George FitzGerald, 1st Baronet (15 September 1808 – 6 August 1880), also styled as the 19th Knight of Kerry, was an Irish nobleman and landowner.

== Early life ==
Peter George FitzGerald was born on 15 September 1808 and was raised in the banking house of his maternal grandfather in Dublin. He was the eldest surviving son of the Right Hon. Sir Maurice FitzGerald, 18th Knight of Kerry (1774–1849) of Gleanleam, Valentia Island, County Kerry and his wife Maria, the daughter of the Right Honourable David la Touche of Marlay.

== Career ==
Sir Peter entered the civil service and was appointed Vice-Treasurer of Ireland in the last ministry of Sir Robert Peel. In 1849, he succeeded his father and resided most often on Valentia Island. He devoted himself to the improvement of his estates, and the welfare of his tenantry. He especially earned the thanks of the people by the erection of substantial homesteads in place of the old and poorly maintained cabins that were common for the middleman system in the west of Ireland. FitzGerald had a keen interest in all questions which had a practical bearing on the progress or prosperity of Ireland and, in contributions to The Times, he deprecated the censure that was cast so often indiscriminately upon Irish landlords.

His own admirable personal qualities, his hatred of abuses, his engaging manners, and his generous nature made him a great favourite with the Irish peasantry. His hospitality at Glanleam was enjoyed by the Prince of Wales and other distinguished guests. The Transatlantic telegraph cable had its British termination on his Valentia estates. He was an advocate for the cable and helped to rouse public support of it.

Both his UK baronetcy and his hereditary Irish knighthood were inherited by his successors.

== Personal life ==
On 11 August 1838, FitzGerald married Julia Hussey, daughter of Peter Bodkin Hussey of Farranikilla House, County Kerry, a lineal descendant of the Norman family of Hoses, which settled on the promontory of Dingle in the thirteenth century. He and Lady Julia had four sons and seven daughters:

- Mary Emily Francis FitzGerald (1863–1917), who married Sir Capel Molyneux, 7th Baronet (died 1879) of Castle Dillon, County Armagh in 1863.
- Emily FitzGerald (died 1932), unmarried.
- Frances Caroline FitzGerald (died 1921), unmarried.
- Katharine FitzGerald (died 1927), married in 1873 to Rev. Henry Bell, vicar of Muncaster, Cumberland.
- Elizabeth Anne FitzGerald (died 1922), married in 1882 to Francis Spring Rice, 4th Baron Monteagle (1852–1937) (the brother of Thomas Spring Rice, 2nd Baron Monteagle). Their son was Charles Spring Rice, 5th Baron Monteagle (1887–1946).
- Julia Emma Isabella FitzGerald (died 1936), married in 1888 to Stephen Spring Rice (1856–1902). After Spring Rice's death, Julia married Baron Monteagle, her sister Elizabeth's widower.
- Eileen Gertrude FitzGerald, married in 1886 to Brig. Gen. Edward Kaye Daubeney, son of Reverend Robert Thomas Daubeney
- Sir Maurice Fitzgerald, 20th Knight of Kerry, 2nd Baronet of Valentia (1844–1916), married in 1883 to Amélie Bischoffsheim (1858–1947), daughter of Dutch banker Henri Louis Bischoffsheim (1829–1908) and granddaughter of Louis-Raphaël Bischoffsheim (1800–1873).
- Robert John La Touche FitzGerald (1852–?), who married Marion Harte, eldest daughter of Mahony Harte, Esq.
- Peter David FitzGerald (1855–1935), married in 1890 to Helen Mary Percy (died 1904), daughter of Major William Francis Percy
- Brinsley John Hamilton FitzGerald (1859–1931), married in 1918 to Margarita (née Armstrong) Drexel.

FitzGerald was a magistrate and deputy-lieutenant for County Kerry, and was High Sheriff of Kerry in 1849, and of County Carlow in 1875. On 8 July 1880, he was created a baronet of Valentia in the County of Kerry, in the Baronetage of the United Kingdom.

=== Death ===
Peter FitzGerald died on 6 August 1880. He was succeeded in his titles and estates by his eldest son, Captain Maurice FitzGerald, who became 2nd Baronet, 20th Knight of Kerry. Captain Fitzgerald served with distinction in the Anglo-Ashanti wars, being present at the battles of Amoaful, Becquah, and Ordahau, and at the capture of Coomassie.

Titles of nobility (Ireland)
Preceded by Maurice FitzGerald	Knight of Kerry; 1849–1880	Succeeded by Maurice FitzGerald
Baronetage of the United Kingdom
New creation	Baronet (of Valentia); 1880–1880	Succeeded by Maurice FitzGerald
