= FitzGerald baronets =

Set index for FitzGerald baronets

There have been four baronetcies created for persons with the surname FitzGerald, one in the Baronetage of Ireland and three in the Baronetage of the United Kingdom.

- FitzGerald baronets of Clenlish (1644)
- FitzGerald baronets of Newmarket on Fergus (1822)
- FitzGerald baronets of Valentia (1880)
- FitzGerald baronets of Geraldine Place (1903)
