= John FitzGerald, 15th Knight of Kerry =

John FitzGerald, 15th Knight of Kerry (1706 – 10 June 1741) was an Irish politician and hereditary knight.

He was the older son of Maurice FitzGerald, 14th Knight of Kerry, and his wife Elizabeth Crosbie, second daughter of David Crosbie. His younger brother was Robert FitzGerald. In 1728, FitzGerald entered the Irish House of Commons and sat for Dingle until his death. One year later, he succeeded his father as Knight of Kerry.

On 12 April 1732, FitzGerald married Margaret Deane, youngest daughter of Joseph Deane, Chief Baron of the Irish Exchequer, and by her, he had a daughter and a son. FitzGerald died at The Grove, Dingle in 1741 and was succeeded in his title by his only son Maurice.

Parliament of Ireland
Preceded by Thomas Crosbie; Sir Maurice Crosbie	Member of Parliament for Dingle; 1728–1741; With: Thomas Crosbie 1728–1731; Hon. John Perceval 1731–1741	Succeeded by John Perceval, Viscount Perceval; Robert FitzGerald
Titles of nobility (Ireland)
Preceded by Maurice FitzGerald	Knight of Kerry; 1729–1741	Succeeded by Maurice FitzGerald
